= Ihwa Mural Village =

Public art area in Seoul, South Korea

Coordinates: 37.5777474°N 127.0046849°E

Korean name
- Hangul: 이화 벽화 마을
- Hanja: 梨花 壁畫 마을
- RR: Ihwa byeokhwa maeul
- MR: Ihwa pyŏkhwa maŭl

Ihwa Mural Village (Korean: 이화 벽화마을) is a neighborhood in Ihwa-dong, Seoul near Naksan Park. Formerly a slum, the area was revitalized by a Ministry of Culture, Sports and Tourism public art project with paintings and installation art that made it popular with both locals and international tourists for its murals and scenic setting.

== History and environs ==
Ihwa Mural Village is located between Hyehwa Station and Dongdaemun station, just below Naksan Park. In 2006, when the public art project started, Ihwa-dong, one of Seoul's oldest neighbourhoods, was a decaying suburb designated for demolition, and home to mostly poor families and elderly people. The government's Ministry of Culture, Sports and Tourism "Art in the City" campaign set about to improve conditions in some of these areas, and included the Ihwa-dong Naksan Project in Iwha-dong and Dongsung-dong near Daehangno in central Seoul.

Ihwa-dong is adjacent to Changgyeonggung on the slopes of Naksan. Jongno District's mural village sits at the foot of Naksan Park and is called "Ihwa village" or "Ihwa mural village". Ihwa-dong and Dongsung-dong were culturally isolated towns despite their location near the busy college area of Daehangno, and the historic neighborhood of Dongdaemun with its many tourist activities.

Ihwa-dong was one of South Korea's many daldongnae or 'moon villages', a name derived from their hilltop locations, traditionally thought to offer a better view of the moon than the cities below. They were inhabited by mostly working class and poor people who couldn't afford housing in flat or central parts of the city. The mural village sat against the old boundary walls of the capital and was a place where refugees squatted after the end of the Korean War in the 1950s, building homes wherever they could. Many residents worked in the nearby garment and textile industries in Changsin-dong making items sold at Dongdaemun Market. But, as other neighborhoods prospered in the 80's and 90's, with high-rise apartment towers, and the redevelopment of early 2000, residents started moving away, draining the neighborhood's vitality.

== Artwork ==
=== Project beginnings ===
The village was part of the history of street paintings in South Korea, with locals and visiting artists carrying out similar projects around the country. In the mural village, buildings and surroundings became part of the art; flowerpots, telephone poles, stone fences, stairs and even "the crack on a wall has been transformed into a wrinkle on a smiling woman's face". The 2006 project took about six months, with citizens and college students, including nearby Hansung University students recruited to volunteer. About 70 artists participated with the paintings and installation art that covered the walls, streets, homes, businesses, underpasses and schools.

One of the artworks was a wall of the neighborhood police station which was painted with white eagles and Korea's national flower, the Rose of Sharon; others were a house with the image of Mount Naksan, the painting of a rabbit, the wings of an angel, and a flower staircase. Over the years, the art had a continued evolution of additions and changes.

=== Naksan Park artwork ===
The region at the foot of Naksan Park is a preamble to the mural village with its steel art structures. The park was established in 2002 to increase green areas in the region and restore the historical site, as much of the mountain area was destroyed during the Japanese colonial era and again during re-development projects of the 1960s. It is one of the most popular photo spots, and sculptures include a gentleman and dog walking towards the sky and a couple holding hands and looking at each other.

== Popularity problems, art removed and re-added ==
The 2006 art project brought people back, and a sense of community with art collectives and communal gardens. But the influx of tourists and their littering, noise and graffiti made long-term residents of the neighborhood wonder if the changes were for the better. About a year after the project began, they requested the removal of many of the murals, amounting to almost half the original art.

In 2010, the KBS2 entertainment show 2 Days & 1 Night with Lee Seung-gi was filmed in the village and made a "wing mural" with two white angel wings so popular among tourists that the resident removed the artwork. Later, more wing murals were painted elsewhere.

In 2012, it was used by the SBS drama Rooftop Prince as a filming location, where Lee Gak (Park Yoo-chun) had a date with Park-ha (Han Ji-min), which became a stop on the typical Korean Wave tour course.

In 2013, Jongno District's tourism division started the "Silent Campaign", "to help visitors understand that the (mural) village is also someone's home", said staffer Lee Sun-min. Lim Young-suk, one of the artists involved in both the 2006 and 2013 projects, said the connection forged between art, the residents and visitors is at the heart of the village, "You come up, and you're in a village where everybody knows everybody, and then you go down and you're in the city. Up here, everybody enjoys life together."

Also, in 2013, artists united again and added another 60 displays, which brought the total number of works to more than a hundred. Professional artists, and students from Kookmin University, Konkuk University, Chung-Ang University, Dankook University and Ewha Womans University made contributions.

By 2015 it had become even more popular with locals and a tourist destination for international travelers, with a continued tourism spike that year. The influx of visitors to the village continued to create problems for local residents, including a loss of privacy.

In April 2016, this resulted in the removal of more artwork by residents. The most popular mural in the village, called 'flower staircase', which had been renovated in 2013 with colored irregular tiles, was painted over with grey paint, along with another mural 'fish staircase'. Efforts were being made by government and locals to build a better relationship between residents and visitors. Local artists addressed the issue by taking more care to integrate residents into projects, By 2016, there were about 100 nationwide areas where murals had been created, and ten mural villages in Seoul.

== See Also ==
- Gamcheon Culture Village
- Huinnyeoul Culture Village
