= Ihwa-dong =

Ihwa-dong may refer to one of the dong, or neighborhood in cities of South Korea.

- Ihwa-dong in Jongno-gu, Seoul
- Ihwa-dong in Gyeyang-gu, Incheon
