= Hyehwa-dong =

Neighborhood in Seoul, South Korea

Coordinates: 37°35′N 127°00′E

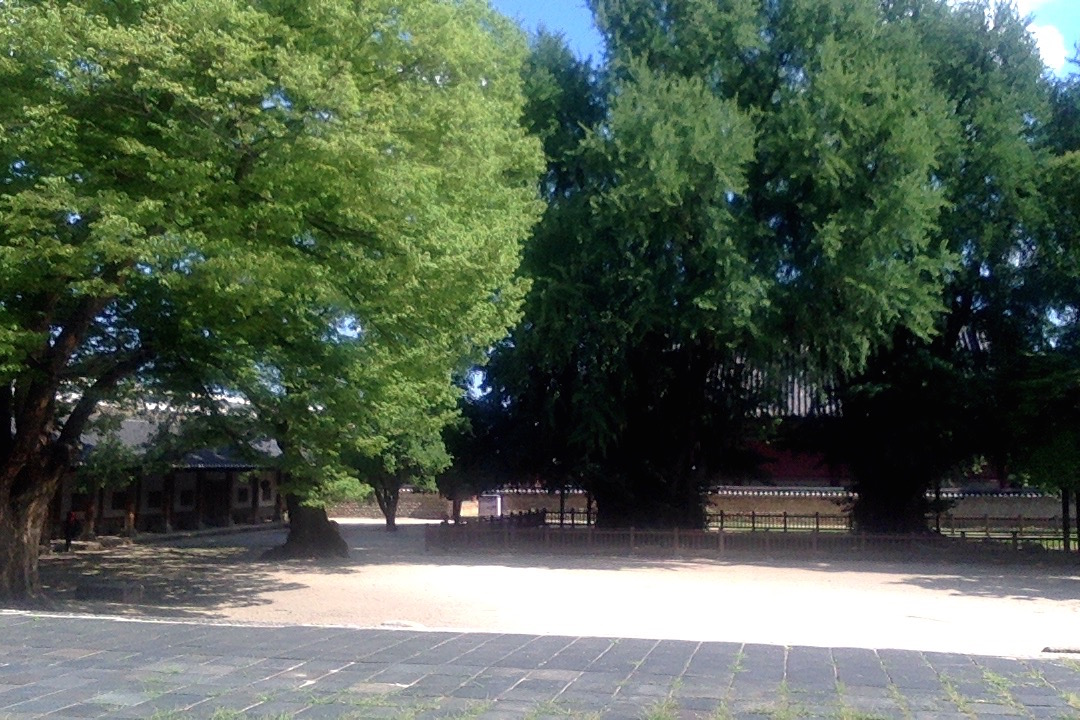
- Ginkgos planted in Sungkyunkwan University
- Interactive map of Hyehwa-dong
- Country: South Korea

Area
  - Total: 0.72 km^{2} (0.28 sq mi)

Population (2001)
  - Total: 12,012
  - Density: 17,000/km^{2} (43,000/sq mi)

Korean name
- Hangul: 혜화동
- Hanja: 惠化洞
- RR: Hyehwa-dong
- MR: Hyehwa-dong

Hyehwa-dong (Korean: 혜화동) is a dong (neighborhood) of Jongno District, Seoul, South Korea. It is adjacent to the Seoul National University Hospital.

== Attractions ==
- PMC Daehangno Jayu Theater - the musical Polaroid was performed from 3 to 24 August 2008, starring Andy of Shinhwa and former Miss Korea Lee Hanee.

== Education ==
Lycée International Xavier was located in this dong. It moved to Gugi-dong in May 2005.

- Lycée International Xavier
- Sungkyunkwan University

== See also ==
- Administrative divisions of South Korea
