= Dongsung-dong =

- Interactive map of Dongsung-dong
- Country: South Korea

Area
  - Total: 0.37 km^{2} (0.14 sq mi)

Korean name
- Hangul: 동숭동
- Hanja: 東崇洞
- RR: Dongsung-dong
- MR: Tongsung-dong

Dongsung-dong (Korean: 동숭동) is a dong (neighborhood) of Jongno District, Seoul, South Korea. It is a legal dong (beopjeong-dong 법정동 法定洞) administered under its administrative dong (haengjeong-dong 행정동 行政洞), Ihwa-dong.

== Notable places ==
- The Korean Culture & Arts Foundation (Hanguk Munhwa Yesul Jinheungwon 한국문화예술진흥원)
- Korea National Open University (Hanguk Bangsong Tongsin Daehakkyo 한국방송통신대학교)
- Marronnier Park
- National Institute for International Education Development, Ministry of Education (Gukje Gyoyuk Jinheungwon 국제교육진흥원)
- Dongsoong Art Center

== See also ==
- Administrative divisions of South Korea
