= Yeongeon-dong =

- Interactive map of Yeongeon-dong
- Country: South Korea

Area
  - Total: 0.30 km^{2} (0.12 sq mi)

Korean name
- Hangul: 연건동
- Hanja: 蓮建洞
- RR: Yeongeon-dong
- MR: Yŏn'gŏn-dong

Yeongeon-dong (Korean: 연건동) is a dong (neighbourhood) of Jongno District, Seoul, South Korea. It is a legal dong (법정동 法定洞) administered under its administrative dong (행정동 行政洞), Ihwa-dong.

== See also ==
- Administrative divisions of South Korea
