= Dongmyo Flea Market =

Flea market in Seoul, South Korea

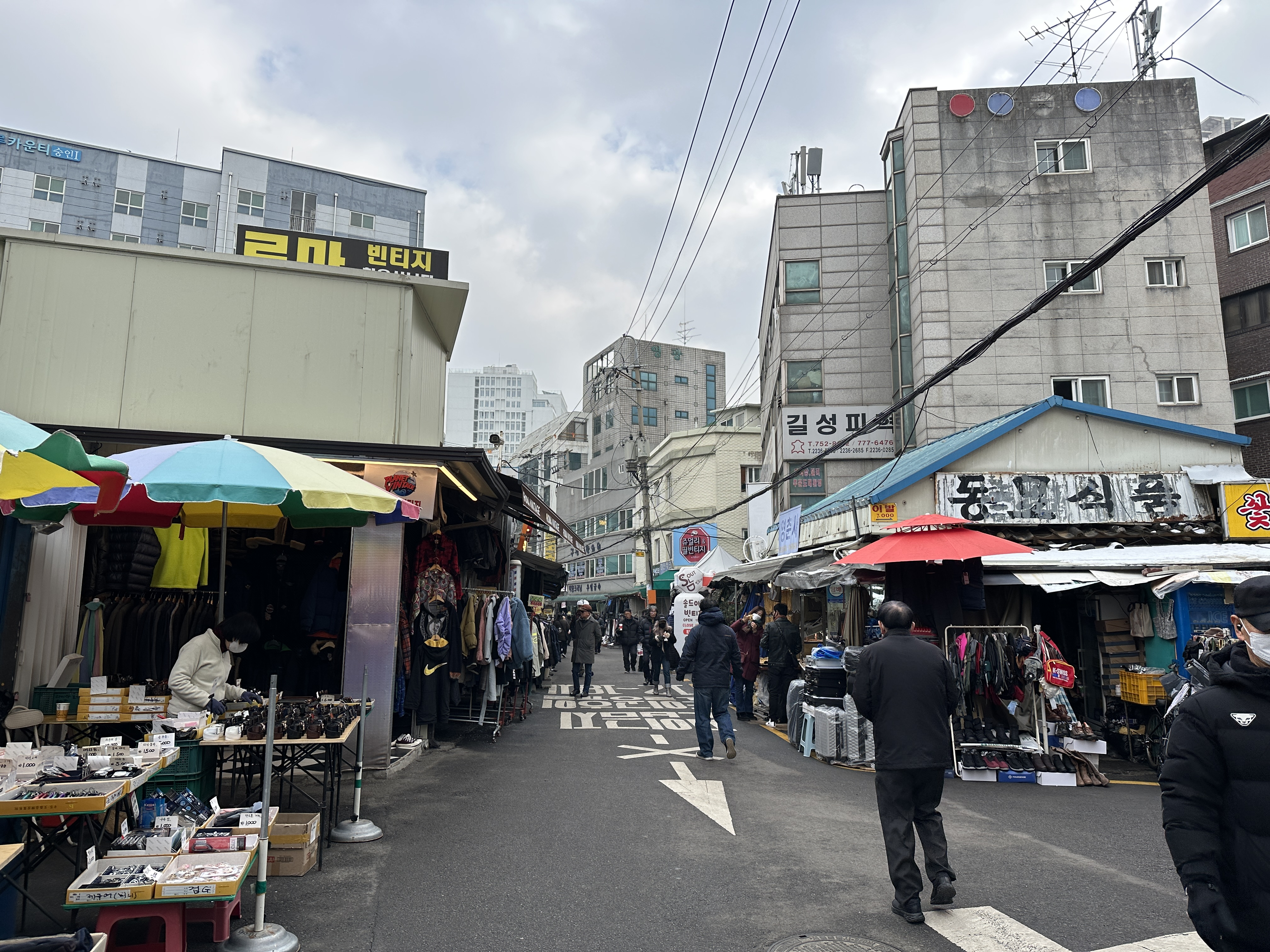
- A street in the market (January 2024)
- Location: Sungin-dong, Jongno District, Seoul, South Korea; 37.5731°N 127.0177°E
- Goods sold: Vintage goods, clothing
- Interactive map of Dongmyo Flea Market

Dongmyo Flea Market (Korean: 동묘벼룩시장) is a flea market in Sungin-dong, Jongno District, Seoul, South Korea. It is located next to and named for the shrine Dongmyo. It is just outside of exit 3 of Dongmyo station on Line 1 of the Seoul Metropolitan Subway.

== Description ==
It has a large number of street merchants who sell a significant variety of goods. Vintage items, such as CDs, old electronics, and books, are sold in abundance. Clothing is available in significant quantities, with some items, like jackets and jeans, sold for very low prices. A number of these merchants are unlicensed and cause the streets to be congested. The local government has reportedly expressed conflicted opinions on how and whether to regulate these merchants, as they are seen as part of the appeal of the market.

A market has existed in the area of the current market possibly since the Joseon period. It developed its current character organically beginning around the late 1980s, and significantly expanded in the 2000s. Since 2016, the local merchant association (동묘지역연합회) has been running a fund for donating a portion of their profits to underprivileged people in the area.

The market has become popular with young South Koreans and tourists, who see it as a place to look for bargains on vintage items and clothing.

In 2013, the market was featured on the show Infinite Challenge, which reportedly caused a spike in the market's popularity amongst younger people. This was commented on in G-Dragon's new music-variety programme, Good Day, where in episode one, G-Dragon returns and finds a shopkeeper has his store 'Vintage GD' named after the artist, and who stated that the location was colloquially known as 'GD-Alley'.

== Gallery ==
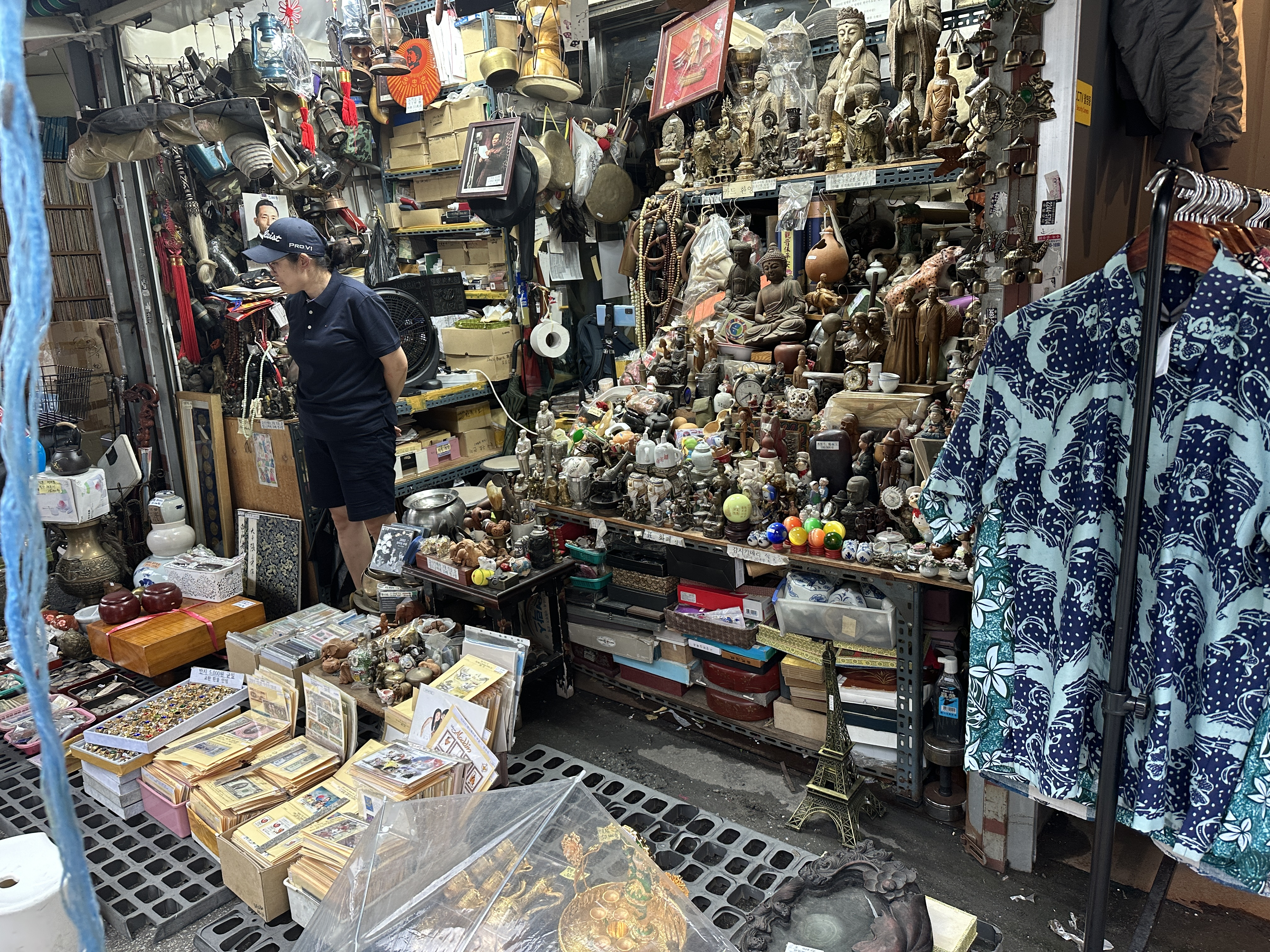
Goods in the market (2024)

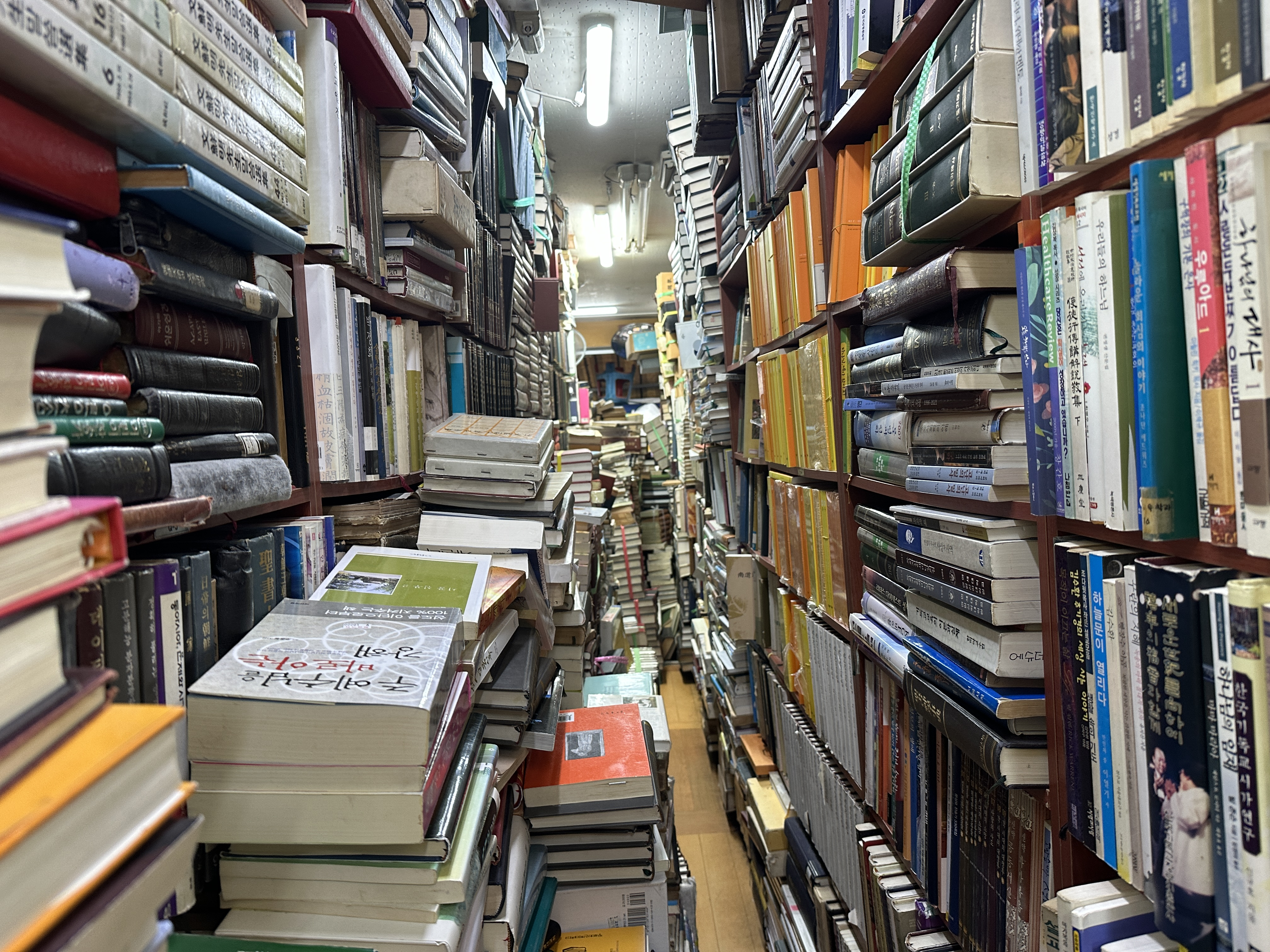
Packed bookshelves in a store (2024)

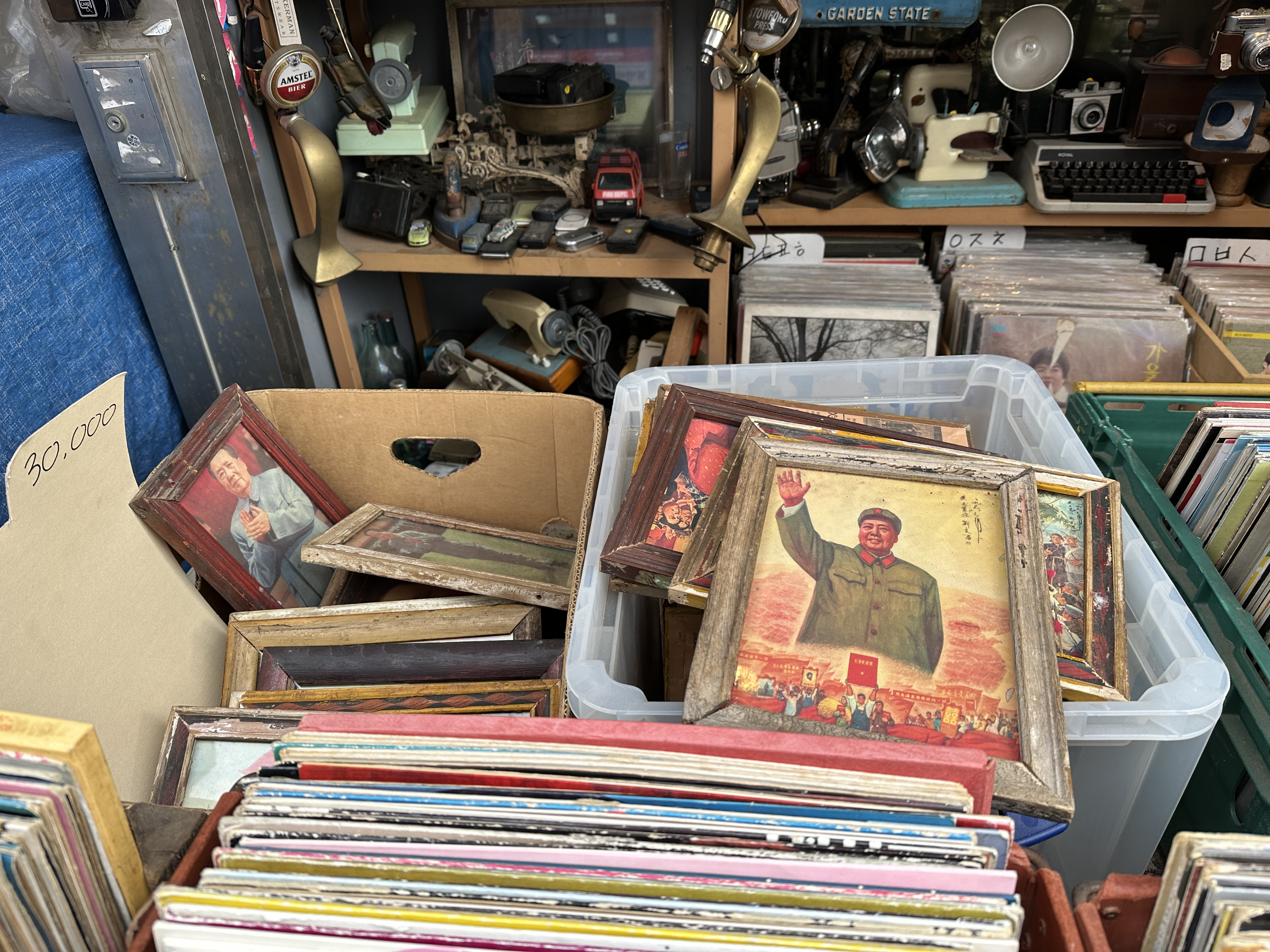
Goods in the market, including a picture of Mao Zedong (2024)
