= Kim Sun-ja =

Kim Sun-ja may refer to:

- Kim Sun-ja (athlete)
- Kim Sun-ja (serial killer)
