= SGHS =

SGHS may refer to:

Australia

- South Grafton High School - Grafton, New South Wales
- Sydney Girls High School - Moore Park, New South Wales
- Strathfield Girls High School - Strathfield, New South Wales

Bangladesh

- Satkhira Government High School - Satkhira, Khulna Division

South Korea

- Seoul Global High School

New Zealand

- Southland Girls' High School - Invercargill

United States

- San Gabriel High School - San Gabriel/Alhambra, California (Los Angeles area)
- South Garland High School - Garland, Texas (Dallas/Fort Worth area)
- South Garner High School - Garner, North Carolina (Raleigh/Durham/Chapel Hill (Research Triangle) area)
- South Granville High School - Creedmoor, North Carolina
- Southern Guilford High School - Greensboro, North Carolina
