= Kim Sun-ja (serial killer) =

South Korean serial killer

Kim Seon-ja
- Born: 1939; Rinpon-namdu, Keijō, Korea, Empire of Japan
- Died: December 30, 1997 (aged 57–58); Daejeon Prison, Daejeon, South Korea
- Status: Executed by hanging
- Conviction: Murder (5 counts)
- Penalty: Death

Details
- Victims: 5
- Span of crimes: 1986–1988
- Country: South Korea
- State: Seoul
- Date apprehended: September 2, 1988

Korean name
- Hangul: 김선자
- RR: Gim Seonja
- MR: Kim Sŏnja

Kim Sun-ja (Korean: 김선자; Hanja: 金宣子; December 11, 1939 – December 30, 1997) was a South Korean serial killer. Between October 1986 and August 1988, she poisoned six people, five of them fatally, using beverages laced with potassium cyanide. She was amongst the last 23 people executed in the country prior to the moratorium enacted by then-president Kim Dae-jung.

== Personal life ==
Kim was a housewife who lived in Sindang-dong, a dong in Seoul's Jung District, along with her three sons. The family relied entirely on her husband's salary as a painter, but that did not stop Kim from borrowing money from various people, due to her frequent visits to cabarets and a gambling addiction. In the end, she decided to kill creditors and steal their money.

== Murders ==
On October 31, 1986, Kim asked 49-year-old Kim Gye-hwan, a friend of hers who also lived in Sindang-dong, to go to the bathroom together. Not long after, Gye-hwan fell down the stairs after drinking a cyanide-laced beverage. She was transferred to a nearby hospital, but died suffering from severe cramps and breathing difficulties. Her necklace and ring had been stolen, but police found no evidence connecting Kim Sun-ja to the crime.

On April 4, 1987, Kim asked 50-year-old Jeon Soon-ja, a creditor who lived in Sindang-dong, if they could ride the bus together so she could get some money in Yeongdeungpo. She borrowed 7 million won, and the two women then boarded a bus. While riding on the bus, Jeon started complaining that her drink had been poisoned with something, and fell from her seat. She was taken to a nearby hospital, but soon after died.

On February 10, 1988, she suggested to 46-year-old Kim Soon-ja, another creditor based in Sindang-dong, that they go to a coffee shop together so Soon-ja could receive money from a debtor. Kim had borrowed 1.2 million won from Soon-ja some time before, and agreed to go with her. Both waited for the debtor to come out, but after he didn't show up, they decided to leave. Soon-ja then drank a poisoned Yulmu-cha, which caused her to vomit on the way home in the taxi. Kim said that she would get better if she had more of the healthy drink, but suggested that they get out of the taxi first. Soon-ja, already suspicious of her behavior, ignored her suggestion. Kim later repaid her, and even visited her house to ask if she was alright.

On March 27, 1988, Kim took the intercity bus together with her father, 73-year-old Kim Jong-chun, who was returning home from visiting some relatives. She gave him a poisoned beverage, and he soon fainted on the bus due to the cyanide. Jong-chun was taken to a nearby hospital, but doctors were unable to save him.

On April 29, 1988, Kim handed a poisoned drink to her 46-year-old younger sister while they were waiting at the Hwayang-dong bus stop, near the Children's Grand Park. Like the previous victims, Kim had borrowed 10 million won from her sister. The younger Kim fell down on the city bus due to the poisoning, was taken to a nearby hospital by a fellow passenger, but succumbed to the cyanide shortly after. Kim, who had stolen her handbag and jewelry, managed to run away while her sister was carried off from the bus.

On August 8, 1988, Kim met her 46-year-old cousin, Son Si-won, who lived in Changsin-dong, at a coffee shop in Sungin-dong. Kim proceeded to borrow 484 million won, ostensibly for a deposit required to buy a house, and then gave her cousin a poisoned drink. Son Si-won suddenly collapsed while riding the bus toward Seobinggo-dong, was taken to the hospital, and subsequently died.

== Arrest and execution ==
Kim Seon-ja was arrested on September 2 by the Yongsan District police on charges of poisoning relatives and creditors. The police had carried out autopsies on four people who died under suspicious circumstances, finding citric acid in three of the bodies.

Kim vehemently denied the accusations, but nevertheless, police searched her home in order to find evidence, while Kim's body was searched by a policewoman. Authorities found jewelry and cash stolen from the deceased. In addition, the day after she had murdered Son Si-won, Kim deposited a check in an account at the Sadang-dong branch of the CHB Bank. Judging from these circumstances, she was identified as the culprit.

Kim was living in an old Japanese house at the time of the crime. A police officer, while searching through her home, found a small hole in a newspaper while looking at the toilet in the restroom. The policeman unpacked the newspaper and found a clump of cyanide, which Kim had used for the crimes. According to the investigators, she had bought it from a nephew working at a chemical company, under the pretense of catching pheasants.

Kim strongly denied the accusations during the trial, but was sentenced to death by the Supreme Court in 1989. On December 30, 1997, she was executed at the Daejeon Prison. On the day of her execution, 22 other violent criminals were also executed in prisons around the country, the last executions conducted in South Korea.

== In popular culture ==
On September 23, 2003, the 34th episode of the MBC-broadcast program "True Story - Theater, Crime and Punishment", titled "A Woman Called Death - Serial Poison Murders", covered Kim Sun-ja's crimes and trial. Here, she and other parties were renamed, with Kim being given the name Lee Jae-sook. Cyanide, the poison used in her crimes, was also renamed to X2.

== See also ==
- Capital punishment in South Korea
- List of serial killers by country
