= Hwanghak-dong Flea Market =

Used goods market in Seoul, South Korea

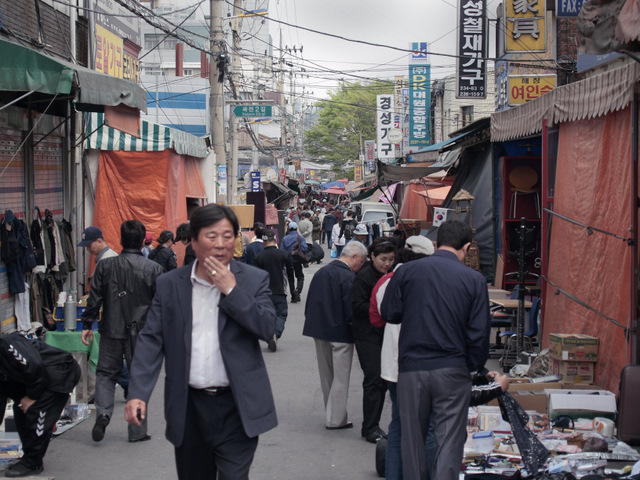
- The market in 2008
- Coordinates: 37.5689°N 127.0181°E

- Hwanghak-dong Flea Market
- Hangul: 황학동 벼룩시장
- Hanja: 黃鶴洞 벼룩市場
- RR: Hwanghak-dong byeoruksijang
- MR: Hwanghak-tong pyŏruksijang

Hwanghak-dong Flea Market (Korean: 황학동 벼룩시장) is a market located in the neighborhood of Hwanghak-dong, Jung District, Seoul, South Korea to sell second-hand goods. It has over 500 shops and stalls near Dongdaemun Market supplying a wide range of used products such as electronic appliances, clothes, and other items. The market is also called Dokkaebi Market (도깨비시장), named for the mythical goblin-like creature dokkaebi. It is located behind Samil Apartment and Cheonggyecheon.

== See also ==
- Dongmyo Flea Market – another flea market in Seoul
- List of markets in South Korea
- List of South Korean tourist attractions
