= Seoul National University Hospital =

Hospital in Seoul, South Korea

Coordinates: 37.5796°N 126.9990°E

Seoul National University Hospital (서울대학교병원)
- Seoul National University

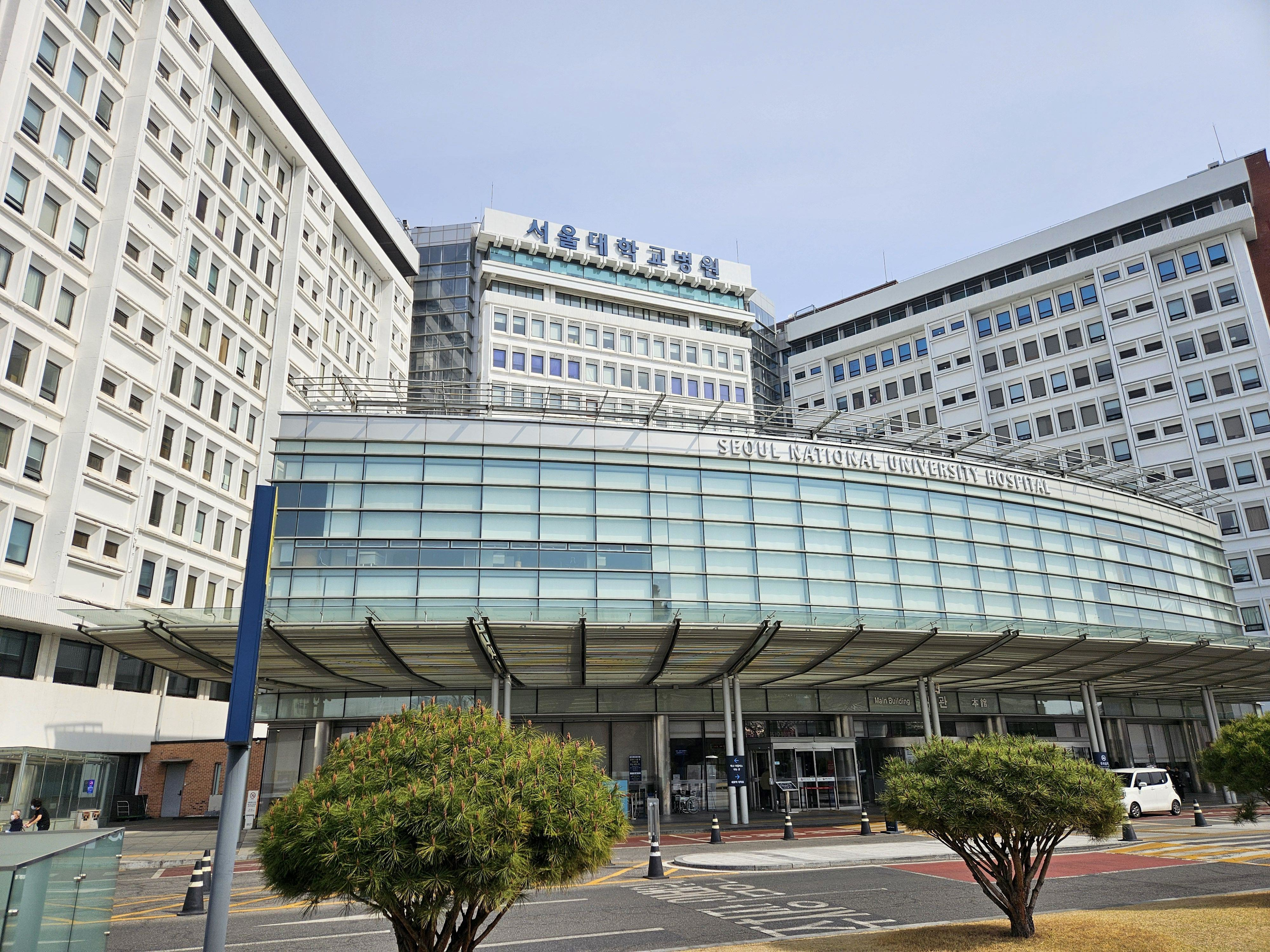
- SNUH Headquarter Building

Geography
- Location: 101 Daehak-ro, Jongno-gu, Seoul, South Korea

Organisation
- Care system: Universal Health Care
- Type: General, Teaching
- Affiliated university: College of Medicine, Seoul National University

Services
- Emergency department: Yes
- Beds: 1591 (Main Branch)

History
- Founded: 1946

Links
- Website: www.snuh.org/english

Seoul National University Hospital (Korean: 서울대학교병원; RR: Seouldaehaggyobyeong-won) is a teaching hospital located in Yeongeon-dong, Jongno-gu, Seoul, South Korea. It is a general and teaching hospital of Seoul National University's College of Medicine.

This hospital was the site of the Seoul National University Hospital Massacre.

== Description ==
It consists of six branches:

Branch Name	Location	Type	ED
SNUH Main Branch	Jong-ro, Seoul	General, Teaching	Yes
SNUH Children's Hospital	Jong-ro, Seoul	Pediatric, Teaching	Yes
SNUH Cancer Hospital	Jong-ro, Seoul	Specialised, Cancer	Yes
SNUH Bundang Branch	Seongnam, Gyeonggi-do	General, Teaching	Yes
SNUH Boramae Branch	Dong-jak, Seoul	General, Teaching	Yes
SNUH Healthcare System Gangnam Center	Gangnam, Seoul	Specialized, Healthcare	No

Except SNUH Healthcare System Gangnam Center, all branches have an emergency department (ED).

SNUH is owned and operated by SNUH Special Corporation, independent from Seoul National University. The South Korean government's Ministry of Education and Human Resources partly supervises management of the hospital.

== See also ==
- List of hospitals in South Korea
- Seoul National University Hospital Massacre
