= Urban regeneration in South Korea =

After Korean War

Urban regeneration in South Korea began with the reconstruction following the Korean War. (For brevity, references to Korea hereafter refer to South Korea.)

== History ==
In the 1980s, the policies and paradigms for establishing new towns changed greatly. Urban regeneration examples include Housing redevelopment projects, housing refurbishment projects, urban environmental readjustment projects and readjustment projects for new cities. In 2017, the Urban Regeneration project proceeded under the name New-Deal Urban Regeneration.

=== Twentieth century ===
In Korea, urban redevelopment began in 1976. The residential environment was improved by redevelopment of deteriorated homes and inadequate infrastructure. 2.72 million new houses were supplied with redevelopment and reconstruction projects.

However, limitations in the Urban redevelopment project:

- A focus on improving elderly housing, to the detriment of existing residents. Relocation costs hampered the resettlement of low-income residents.
- Neglect of issues around sustaining the existing community generated social problems.
- Projects focused on specific areas. Among 1,428 repair projects, only about 9.4 percent were construction, and some regions were often excluded.

Korea designated 41 cities as major cities for urban regeneration from 2006 to 2007. Among them were the area designated as Seoul's first metropolitan district, Jung-gu district, Dongseo shopping area, Daejeon, Korea's eastern district and the eastern part of the Subway Station. These pilot zones were targeted for the improvement of the residential environment, expansion of infrastructure and restoration of urban functions. Meanwhile, the Ministry of Land, Transport and Maritime Affairs (LTM) launched a plan to revitalize the moribund cities by investing 150 billion won in research and development from 2007 to 2013.

=== 2010s ===
In the early 2000s, urban regeneration was a premier topic in academia. In 2006, the Urban Regeneration Project was launched as a research project. The Urban Regeneration Act, enacted on April 13, 2013, followed the establishment of the LTM in 2008. It was decided to promote economic, social, and cultural activities by enhancing the overall capacity of the area and utilizing local resources. A special committee for urban regeneration in the Prime Minister's Office, enabled a nationwide implementation.

- Main principles – emphasizes the legal nature of the applicant, not the business law. Local governments are planning and executing, and the nation is a form of support. It operates as a two-level plan according to the regeneration activity. It is intended to maintain initial orientation and flexibly respond to site conditions. It emphasizes the system-centric cooperative operating system. Local authorities and local experts collaborate. Depending on the nature of the loss, two types of financial aid are available, direct and indirect support.
- Planning system – Administrative head of local autonomous government establishes plans based on resident participation.
  - Strategic Plan – Create a regeneration plan and regeneration zone to generate focus.
  - Strategic Plan Subsider – Special markets, metropolitan markets, logistics (excluding the local military), special autonomous markets, special self-regulatory offices
  - Activation plan – Execution plan encompassing economic, social, cultural and physical projects for strategic plan designated areas
  - Revitalization-planned Subsider – Strategic Planning Team Leader + District Governor, military logistics in metropolitan areas

Korea's new-deal urban regeneration projects are a major national goal of Moon Jae-in's five-year plan. On July 13, 2017, LTM announced that it would finalize the plan in late August. The project was designed to reduce the size of the existing policy and install small scale residential infrastructure desired by residents without large-scale demolition. The area is leading the project and the government actively supports it. In July 2017, LTM stated, "We consider ways to move more than half of the entire business community into Our Community Renewal Project" (CRP). CRP refers to a way to improve residential homes and install small-scale amenities by local communities. Each area carries out projects in accordance with each situation. This is to allow residents to feel the effects quickly.

The government's housing policy is projected by investing in urban regeneration in urban areas. It aims to simultaneously attack economic hardship and revive the city's competitiveness and enhance the quality of life.

=== Future plans ===
LTM announced on December 14, 2017, that it had selected 68 districts as the city's new New Deal Urban Regeneration Project, to be launched in 2018. Eight Gyeonggi Province cities, including Anyang and Goyang, Gwangmyeong, were selected. The sites of potential cultural assets in the region are conspicuous. Mokpo is planning to establish a historic and cultural street linking Mokpo Port, which opened in 1897 and Hadong, which is close to the former Seoul Metropolitan City, as part of a landmark. Samchun, Busan, Samcheon 2-dong, which symbolized the village's steep slope will install an inclined 235-meter (771 ft) elevator. The 68 districts as pilot sites have a total cost of 6.7 trillion won per company. The government provided 5 to 25 billion won per project with state funds, and the rest were collected by local governments. The government plans to designate 68 pilot project sites as urban regeneration zones.

== Types ==
=== Economic ===
The project goal is to introduce new economic capabilities. It aims to create employment based on existing industrial functions and industries and to stimulate economic recovery to surrounding areas. The institution links urban regeneration, development and urban regeneration with key facilities that have significant economic recovery. It targets areas where employment can be created through composite development projects(anchor businesses).

Typical example

- Soil reclamation and surrounding regeneration
- Activating ports and development in Station Areas
- Combined use
- Cultural assets and tourism

=== Neighbourhood ===
- Objective
  - Use local characteristics to boost the economy of the depressed central district
  - Keep the community together by improving the living conditions of lagging residential neighborhoods
- Target area – Decaying commercial area, such as the main street and the areas behind it, and a residential neighborhood in poor condition.
- Project
  - Expansion of infrastructure and projects such as culture, art, and tourism to boost the commercial market
  - Creating community-centered incomes by expanding infrastructure for retirement and decaying residential areas and by creating a social economy (e.g., social enterprise cooperatives, village businesses)

== Examples ==
=== Seoul ===
==== Cheonggyecheon ====
Cheonggyecheon was constructed in 1411 of Joseon (1392-1910) to prevent flooding. Many residents lived around the stream. The Government of Japan, partially closed the stream by building a road in 1937 to reduce traffic and hygiene problems. After Korea’s liberation from Japan in 1945, the city completely closed the stream with a concrete overpass. In 2002, then Seoul Mayor Lee Myung-bak removed the concrete roads and recovered the waterway beneath — a mega project that became the nation’s first landmark urban renewal project. The project’s success contributed to Lee’s victory in the 2007 presidential election. To better attract visitors, the city offers a variety of free exhibitions and events along the 12-kilometre-long (7.5 mi) trail. As of August 2015, it had attracted over 191 million visitors.

=== Gyeonggi ===
==== Paju Book City ====
Paju Book City, 30 kilometers (19 mi) outside of Seoul, became a tourist attraction as an island of companies and stores devoted to books. Located in the border town of Paju, Gyeonggi Province, this cultural complex was created with government support through a national industrialization development grant. In an effort to differentiate the complex as an artistic landmark, architects Florian Beigel, Kim Jong-kyu and Kim Yong-joon created Architectural Guideline for Book City. The result is a flourishing area of publishing houses, cafes, and stores.

=== Busan ===
==== Gamcheon Culture Village ====
Gamcheon Culture Village, an amalgam of lego-shaped buildings is sited atop a hill in Busan. The pastel-colored houses are clustered on terraced land with narrow alleyways between them. In the past, Gamcheon Village was a dilapidated neighborhood that was a hub for Korean War refugees, and later for practitioners of the Taeguk-do religion. Its elevation made it an unattractive location for developers, allowing the area to maintain its original structures. Today, the village is decorated with murals and sculptures. Old empty buildings were transformed into exhibition spaces, renamed “Korea’s Santorini on the South Sea". Public bath buildings, wells and steep steps remained intact. Gamcheon is cited as an example of renovation without destruction.
