= Huinnyeoul Culture Village =

Town in Busan, South Korea

Huinnyeoul Culture Village 흰여울문화마을
- Mural village
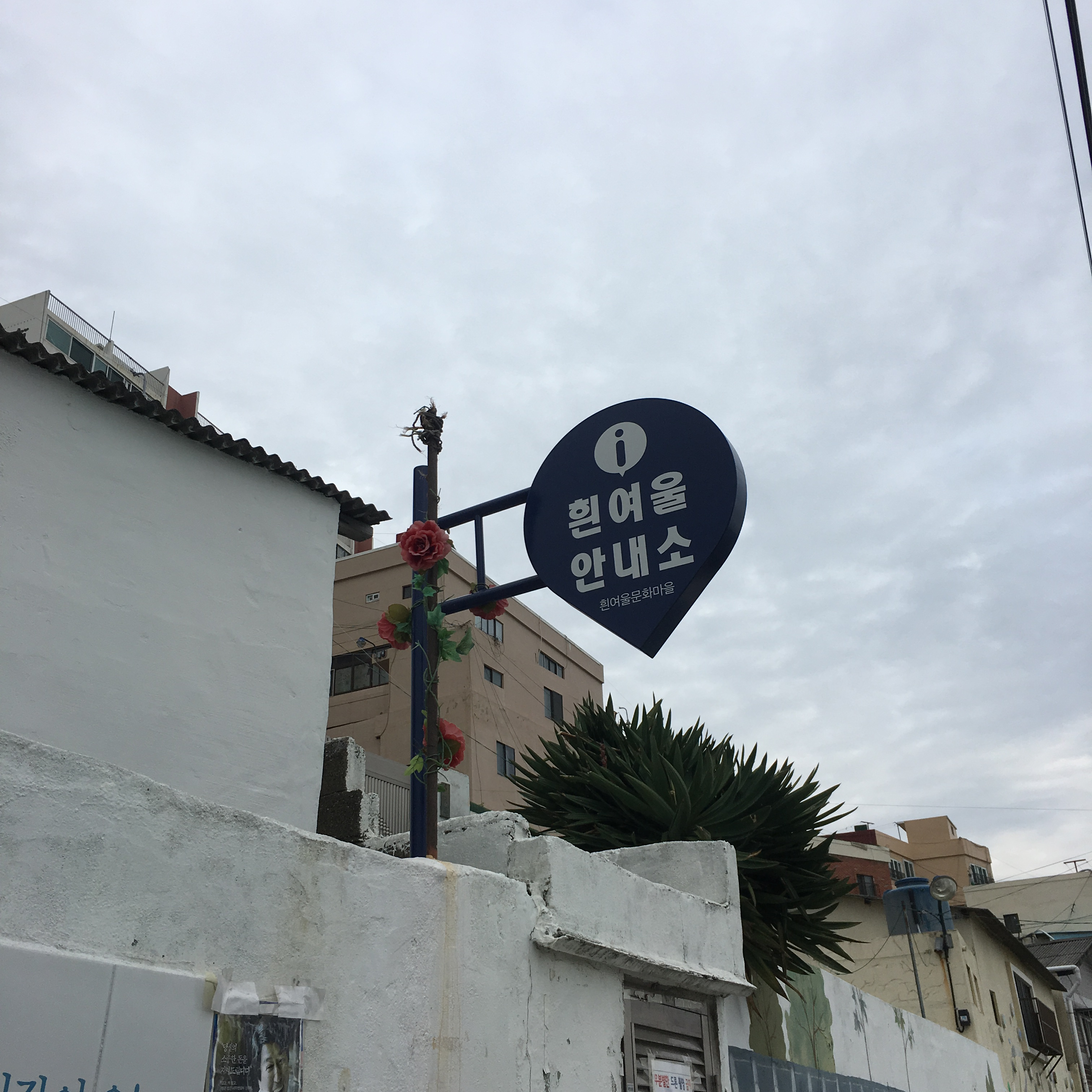
- Sign of Huinnyeoul Culture Village information bureau.

- Location within Busan
- Coordinates: 35.078°N 129.045°E
- Country: South Korea
- Region: Yeongnam
- City: Busan
- Dong: Yeongseon-dong

Huinnyeoul Culture Village (Korean: 흰여울문화마을) is a seaside town in Yeongseon-dong, Yeongdo District, Busan, South Korea, located on a high cliff.

== History ==
Huinnyeoul was originally a small fishing village, but when a large number of Korean War refugees fled there, it became a densely populated, impoverished shanty town. Beautification efforts were undertaken in 2010 by the community and by local artists, with murals painted throughout the village and many of the homes repaired or remodeled. Huinnyeoul is now one of several of Korea's culture villages, and has become a popular tourist attraction.

== Name ==
Huinnyeoul has been nicknamed Korea's Santorini. The village's name, which means 'white rapids,' comes from the white water bubbles that the streams coming down from Bongnae Mountain created when they reached the ocean in front of Yeongdo.

== See also ==
- Gamcheon Culture Village
- Ihwa Mural Village
- Nameless Gangster: Rules of the Time
