= Gamcheon-dong =

Neighborhood of Busan, South Korea

Coordinates: 35°05′15″N 129°00′17″E

- Hangul: 감천동
- Hanja: 甘川洞
- RR: Gamcheon-dong
- MR: Kamch'ŏn-dong

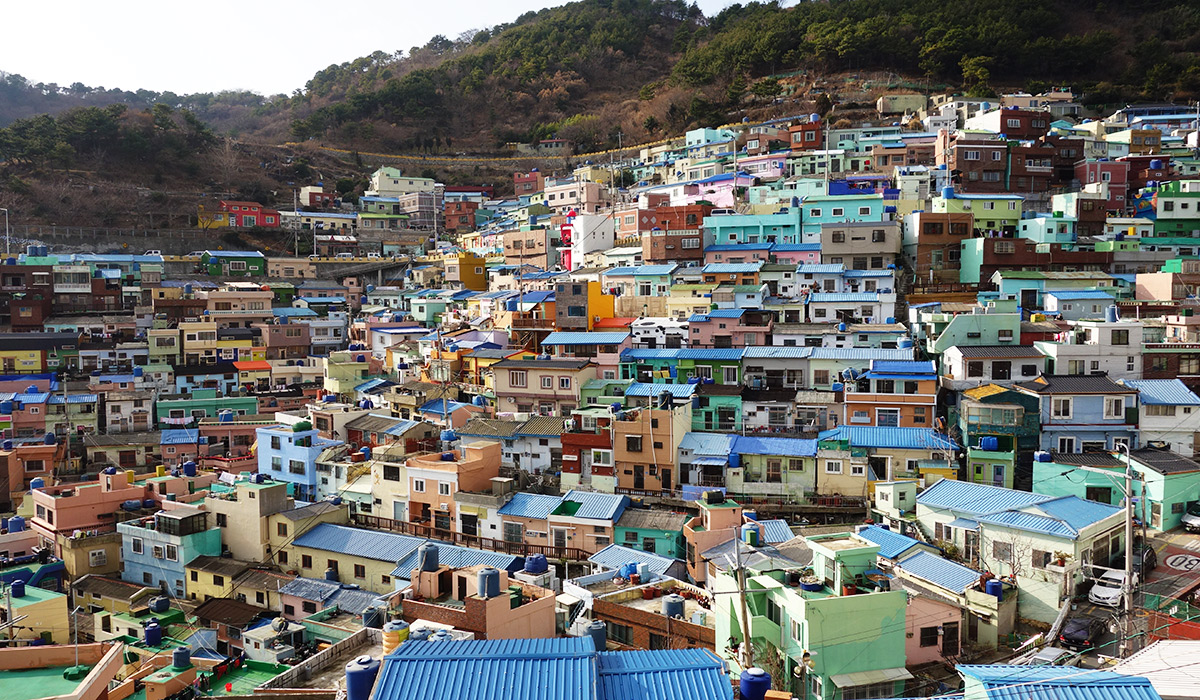
Gamcheon Colored Houses

Gamcheon-dong (Korean: 감천동) is a subdivision of Saha District in central-west Busan, South Korea. It is known for Gamcheon Culture Village, which features steep streets, twisting alleys, and brightly painted houses. The area has seen the emergence of painted street murals, art installations, cafes, shops, museums, workshops, and craft boutiques. Formerly known as Taegeukdo Village, the neighborhood struggled with poverty until 2009 when the South Korean government initiated the "Dreaming of Machu Picchu in Busan Project" to revitalize the area.
