= Gamcheon Culture Village =

Town within Busan, South Korea

- Town
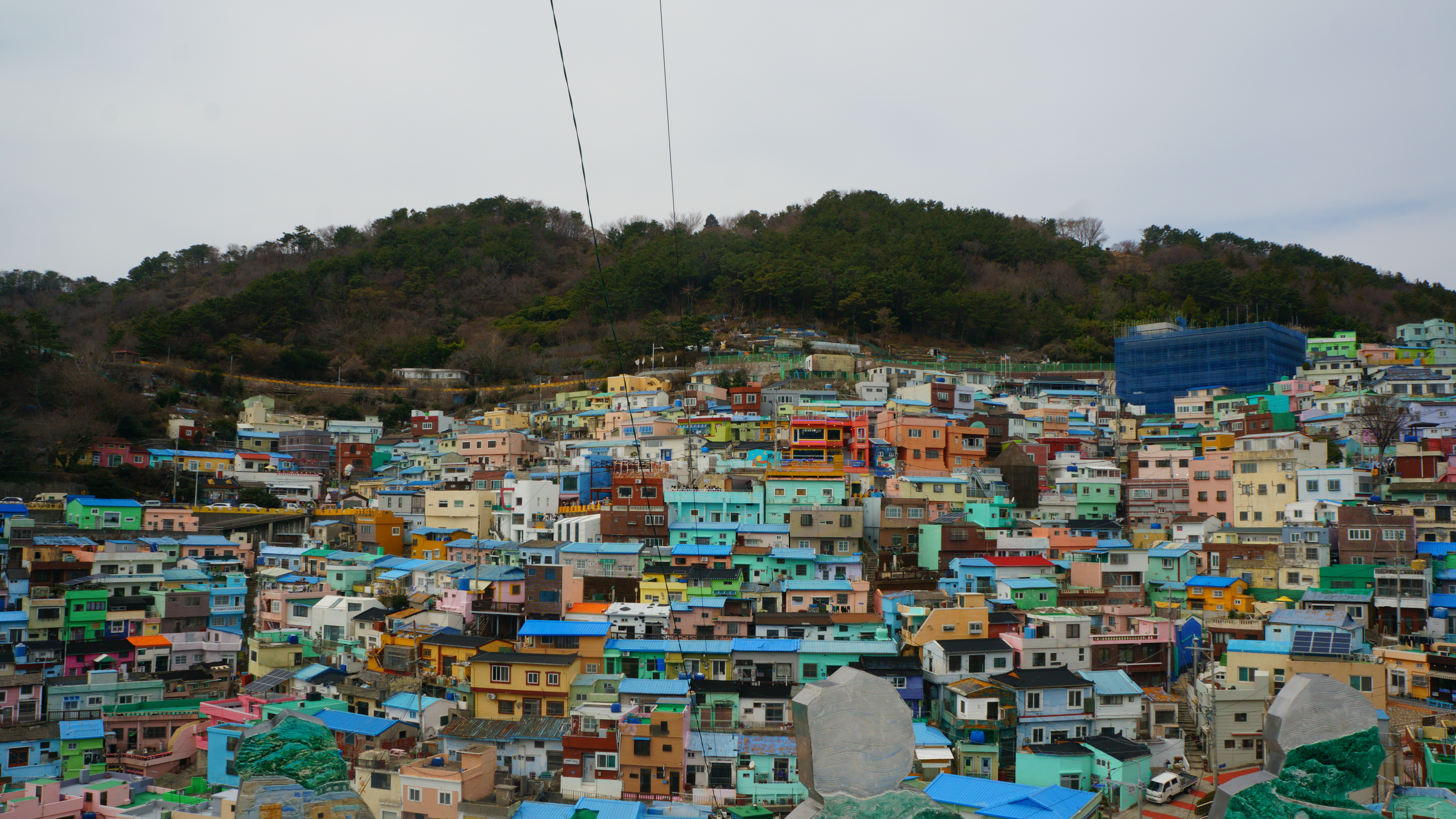
- An overlook of the Gamcheon colorful houses near the entrance, March 2024
- Interactive map of Gamcheon Culture Village
- Coordinates: 35.097°N 129.009°E
- Website: www.gamcheon.or.kr

Korean name
- Hangul: 감천문화마을
- Hanja: 甘川文化마을
- RR: Gamcheon munhwa maeul
- MR: Kamch'ŏn munhwa maŭl

Gamcheon Culture Village (Korean: 감천문화마을) is a town within Gamcheon-dong, Saha District, Busan, South Korea. The area is known for its layered streets, twisted labyrinth-like alleys, and brightly painted houses, which have been restored and enhanced in recent years to attract tourism. Built on a steep mountain-side slope, the village has been nicknamed "Korea's Santorini" and the "Machu Picchu of Busan".

== History ==
Gamcheon Village was built during the 1920s and 1930s when the Busan city administration decided to relocate the working-class population into an area secluded from the port, yet close enough to provide labor. In the midst of a post-war recovery in 1955, around 800 families moved to the village, contributing to the growth of an ascetic religious community known as Taegeukdo, a branch of Jeungsanism. A long-time resident noted the village's development throughout the decades: "Gamcheon was only one district in 1950, now it’s nine. In the ’70s there were only houses made of wood. In the late ’80s and early ’90s, families started to get bigger so they built two-level houses." Nonetheless, the village faced persisting poverty and poor living conditions.

In 2009, the Ministry of Culture, Sports and Tourism carried out a public art-themed renovation effort to convert the village to a cultural hub. It called for art students, professional artists, and residents to maintain, repair, and "decorate" the village with art. The renovation efforts reached their peak with the success of the "Empty House Residency Preservation Project." With improvements to infrastructure, fresh paint, and other home improvements, the establishment of spaces for retail and museums, and the addition of several dozens of art installations, the village has been reborn as Busan's most colorful and artistic spot. Some examples of the colorful art installations include bird sculptures, Murakami-like playful installations, scenes from the Little Prince, and painted schools of fish that guide bearings through the alleyways.

== Tourism ==
The village has turned into one of the most featured tourist attractions in Busan. Since the public art renovation project in 2009, tourism in Gamcheon has increased considerably—the village saw approximately 1.4 million visitors in 2015. Village residents have met this influx of traffic with mixed attitudes. While some residents have participated in the renovation and tourism efforts, others have opted to move away despite difficulties with selling their homes. It is estimated that 300 local houses were empty as of 2015. Part of the development efforts in the Village include converting these abandoned houses into art galleries, museums, and shops.

== See also ==
- Ihwa Mural Village
- Huinnyeoul Culture Village

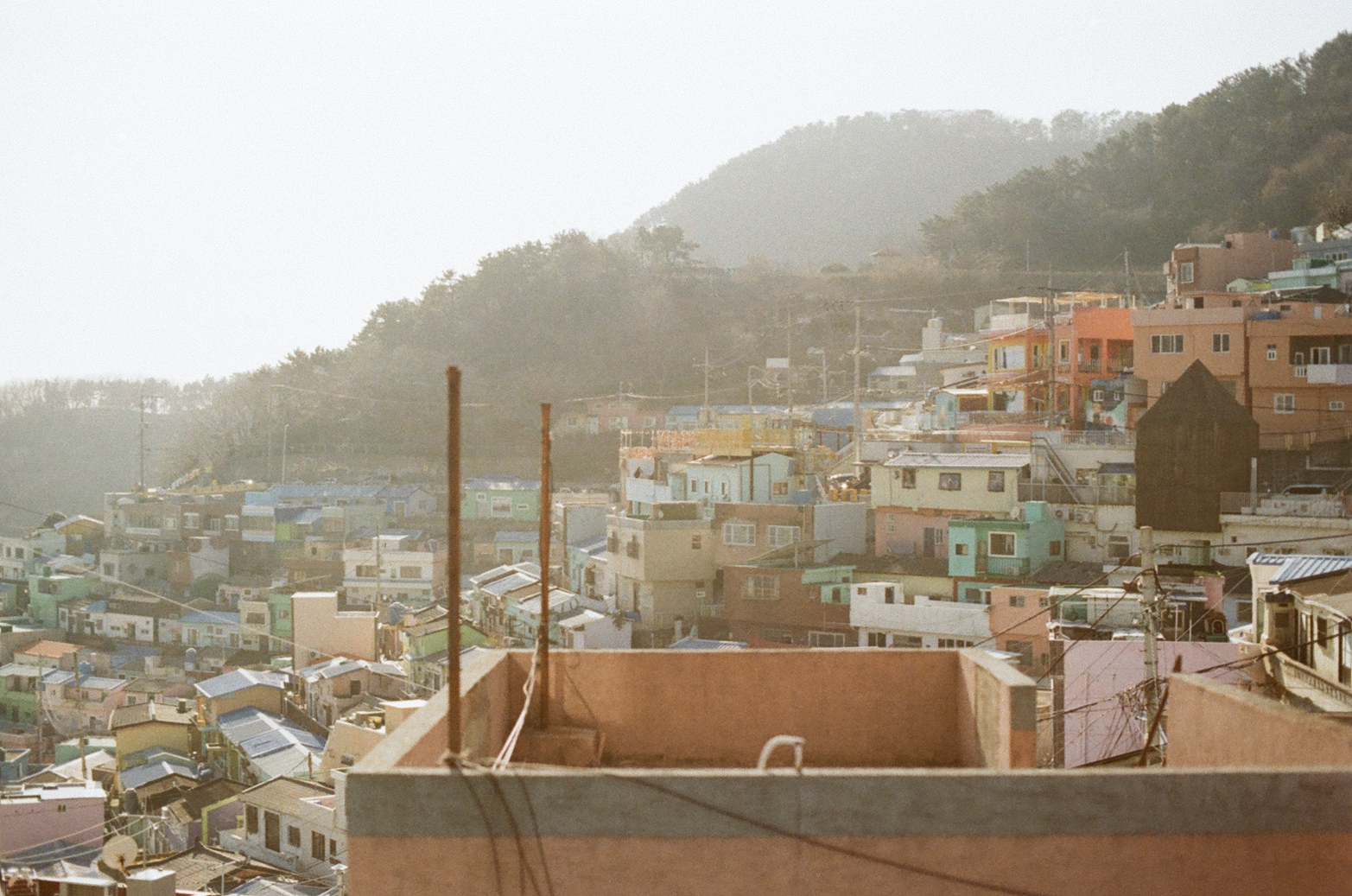
View from within the village

== See also ==
- Urban regeneration in South Korea
- Tourist trap
- Overtourism
