= Hwanghak-dong =

Neighborhood in Seoul, South Korea

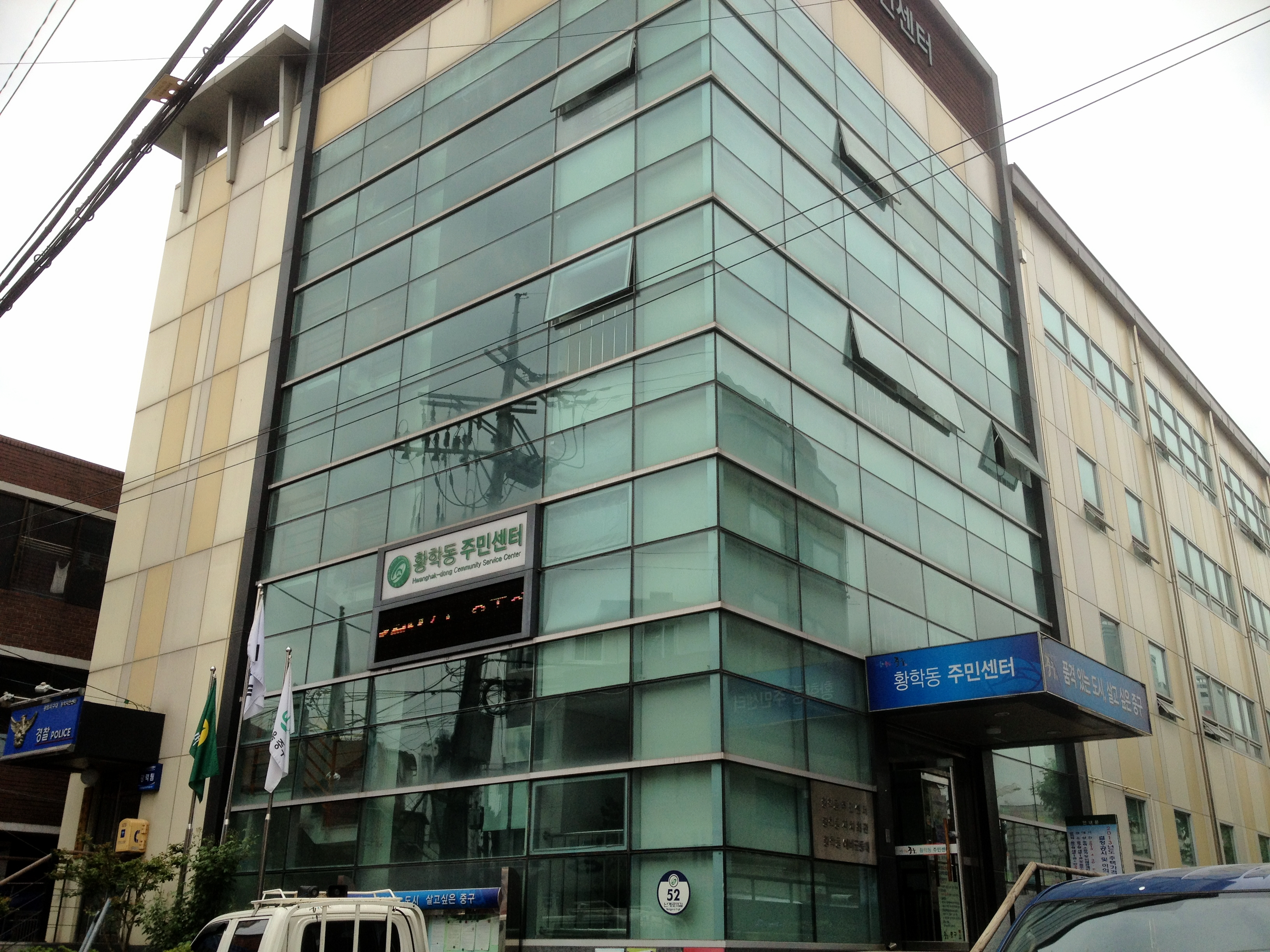
- Hwanghak-dong Resident Office

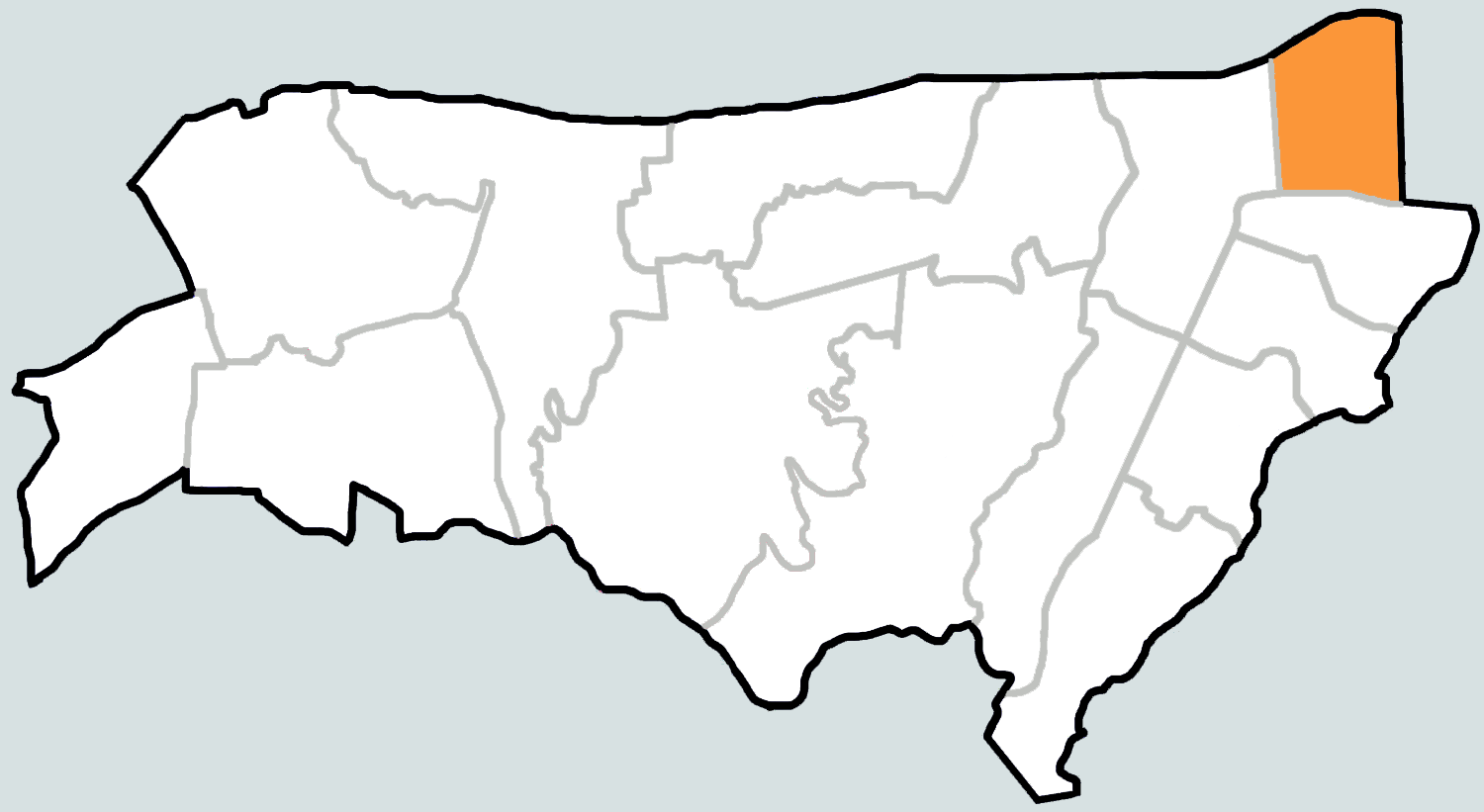
- Country: South Korea

Area
  - Total: 0.33 km^{2} (0.13 sq mi)

Population (2013)
  - Total: 12,238
  - Density: 37,000/km^{2} (96,000/sq mi)

Korean name
- Hangul: 황학동
- Hanja: 黃鶴洞
- RR: Hwanghak-dong
- MR: Hwanghak-tong

Hwanghak-dong (Korean: 황학동) is a dong (neighborhood) of Jung District, Seoul, South Korea.

== Etymology ==
The exact origin of the name "Hwanghak-dong" is unclear. However, as documented in the "Daegyungseongjeongdo" from 1936, it is suggested that during that period, the area was predominantly fields, and the name "Hwanghak" was associated with a sudden appearance, possibly linked to this context. Furthermore, there exists an ancient natural slope known as "Baekhak-dong" within the present Sindang 5-dong vicinity, leading to speculation that the name "Hwanghak-dong" was coined in contrast to it.

== Attractions ==
- Hwanghak-dong Flea Market

== Transportation ==
- Sindang Station of

== See also ==
- Administrative divisions of South Korea
