= Seoul Global High School =

- 서울국제고등학교
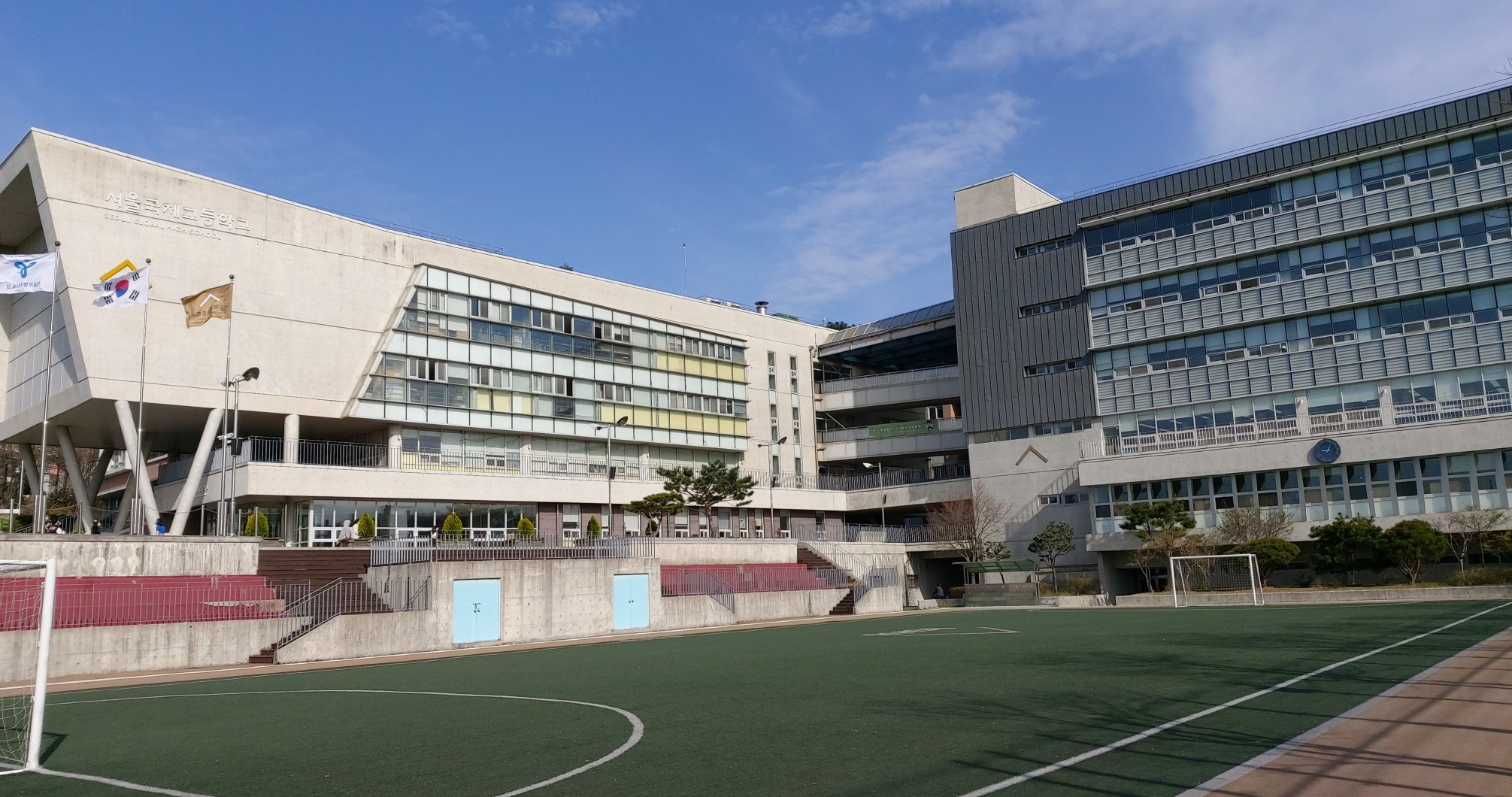

Location
- 40, Sunggyungwan-ro, Jongno-gu (22742); Seoul, Seoul, Jongno District; South Korea

Information
- Type: Korean High School
- Motto: Our Hearts In Korea, Our Eyes to the World (가슴은 한국에, 눈은 세계로)
- Established: 2009
- Status: Opened
- School code: 65321 (SAT Test Center)
- Principal: Kim, Han Joo
- Staff: 103
- Grades: 10–12
- Enrollment: 156 (2016)
- Language: Korean, English, Spanish, Chinese, French
- Campus: Seoul
- Student Union/Association: Seoul Global High School Student Council
- Color: Gold
- Athletics: SGHS Basketball team(Vanguards), SGHS Floorball team
- Nickname: SGHS
- Accreditation: WASC, Ministry of Education(South Korea)
- Newspaper: Amaranth (compiled by the Amaranth Club), Geuldam (Compiled by Geuldam Club)

Seoul Global High School (SGHS; Korean: 서울국제고등학교) is a domestic-international public college preparatory school situated in Jongno District, Seoul, South Korea, offering a Korean Curriculum. SGHS's educational goal is to nurture students to become international specialists equipped with scholastic excellence, honorable character, and physical strength.

Seoul Global High School first opened its doors to students in March 2009 and has classes from 10th to 12th grade. Conveniently located in the Jongno District (part of the metropolitan area in Seoul), SGHS is about ten minutes of the Hyehwa Station (Seoul Subway Line 4). The school provides the dormitory life and day-school.

The Western Association of Schools and Colleges (WASC, Western Association of Schools and Colleges), based in California, accredited Seoul Global High School for a two-year term on September 1, 2015. Following this temporary accreditation, it has gained 5-year accreditation in July 2017. As a condition of attending the school, a student is required to live within Seoul and have graduated from middle schools in Seoul or have more than 9 years of credit from foreign schools.
