= Lycée International Xavier =

French school in Seoul

LYCÉE INTERNATIONAL XAVIER (LIX) is a French school located in Seoul on the northern side of the Han River (Jongno-gu). It has been operating since March 2002 with the French ambassador's consent and the authorization of Seoul's Board of Education.

The LIX is a Catholic school founded by the 'Communauté apostolique Saint François-Xavier'. It is connected to the 'Centres Madeleine Daniélou (CMD)' school network which is run by this community in France and other countries.

Its preschool, elementary, middle and high school programs follow the official programs of the French Ministry of Education. It is affiliated with Mission Laïque Française (MLF), an organization for French schools located outside of France. It is also affiliated with a network of Agence pour l'Enseignement Français à l'Étranger (AEFE), the Agency for French Education Abroad which consists of 522 schools in 139 countries. The elementary school and the 6th grade (6e) are state-certified.
