= Sungin-dong =

Coordinates: 37°35′N 127°01′E

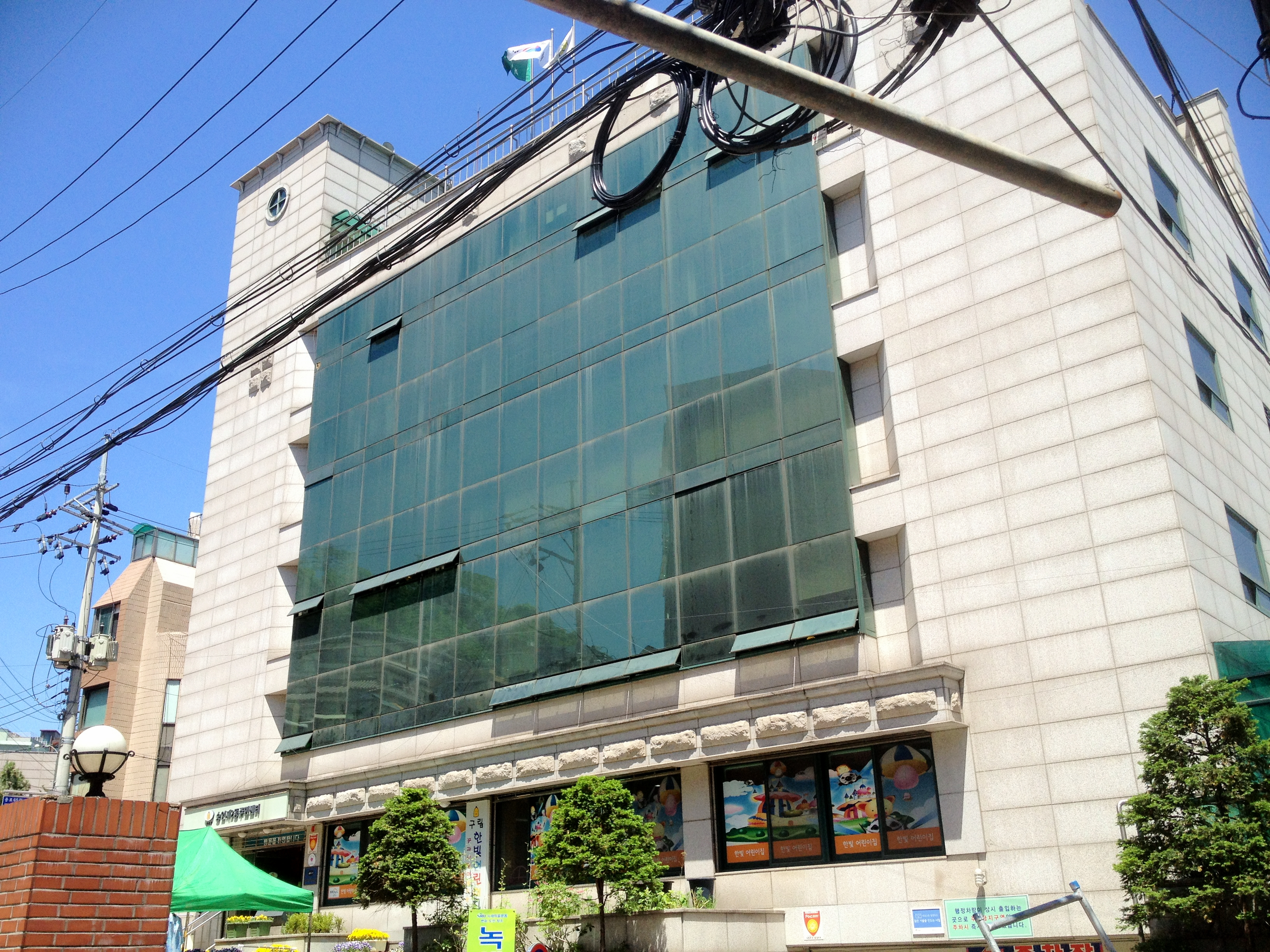
- Interactive map of Sungin-dong
- Country: South Korea

Area
  - Total: 0.58 km^{2} (0.22 sq mi)

Population (2001)
  - Total: 16,889
  - Density: 29,000/km^{2} (75,000/sq mi)

Korean name
- Hangul: 숭인동
- Hanja: 崇仁洞
- RR: Sungin-dong
- MR: Sungin-dong

Sungin-dong (Korean: 숭인동) is a dong (neighbourhood) of Jongno District, Seoul, South Korea.

== See also ==
- Administrative divisions of South Korea
