= Changsin-dong =

- Interactive map of Changsin-dong
- Coordinates: 37.575°N 127.012°E
- Country: South Korea
- Region: Sudogwon
- Special City: Seoul
- District: Jongno

Area
  - Total: 0.80 km^{2} (0.31 sq mi)

Population (2001)
  - Total: 31,821
  - Density: 40,000/km^{2} (100,000/sq mi)

Korean name
- Hangul: 창신동
- Hanja: 昌信洞
- RR: Changsin-dong
- MR: Ch'angsin-dong

Changsin-dong (Korean: 창신동) is a dong (neighborhood) of Jongno District, Seoul, South Korea.

== Attractions ==
- Changsin-dong Toy Wholesale Market - the largest toy and stationery market in Korea since 1975 and is accessible from Dongdaemun Station on Seoul Subway Line 1 and Line 4.

== See also ==
- Administrative divisions of South Korea
