= Ihwa-dong, Seoul =

Coordinates: 37°35′N 127°00′E

Ihwa-dong
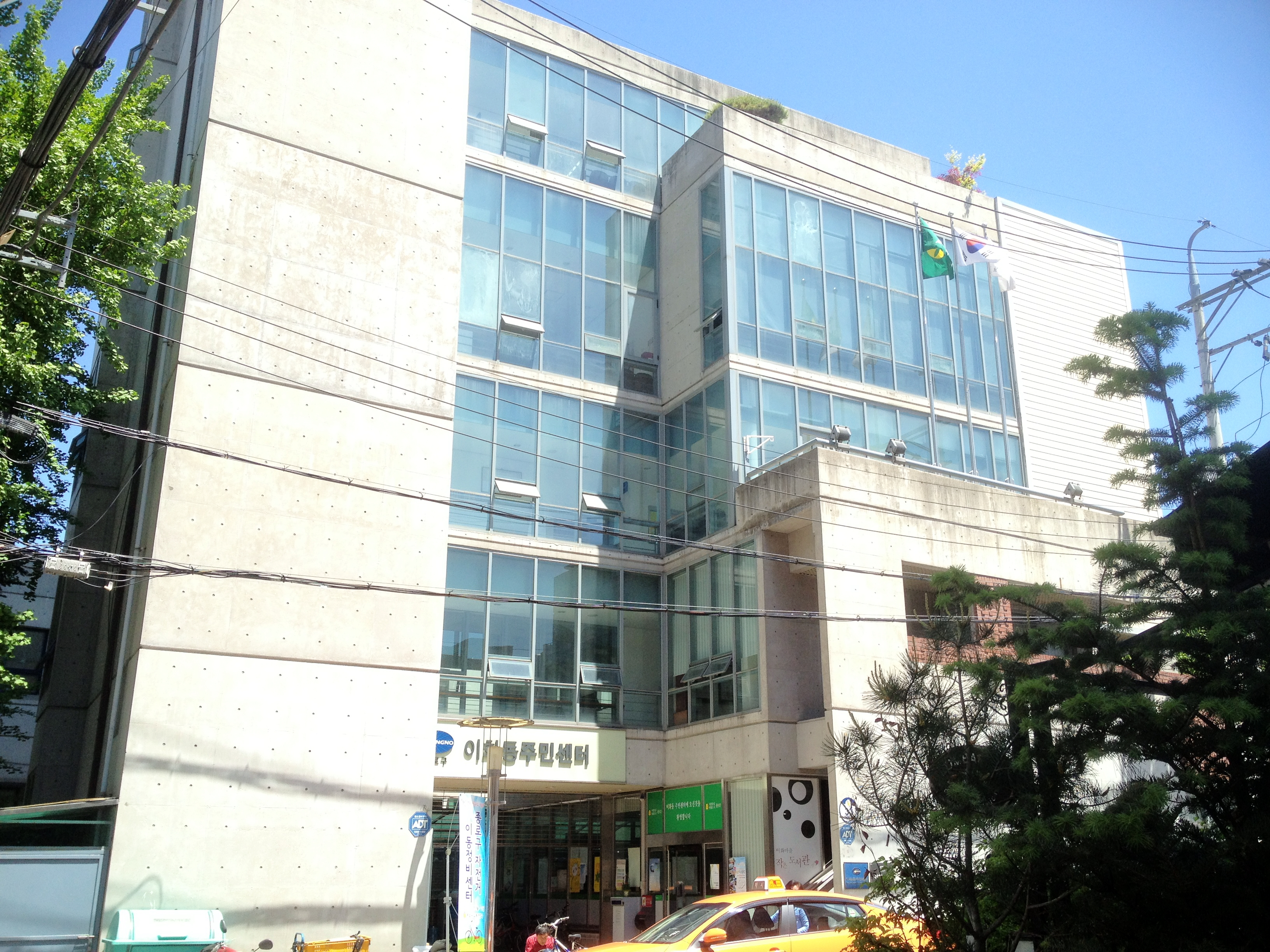
- Ihwa-dong Community Service Center (Jongno District)
- Interactive map of Ihwa-dong
- Country: South Korea

Area
  - Total: 0.78 km^{2} (0.30 sq mi)

Population (2001)
  - Total: 11,722
  - Density: 15,000/km^{2} (39,000/sq mi)

Korean name
- Hangul: 이화동
- Hanja: 梨花洞
- RR: Ihwa-dong
- MR: Ihwa-dong

Ihwa-dong (Korean: 이화동) is a dong (neighborhood) of Jongno District, Seoul, South Korea.

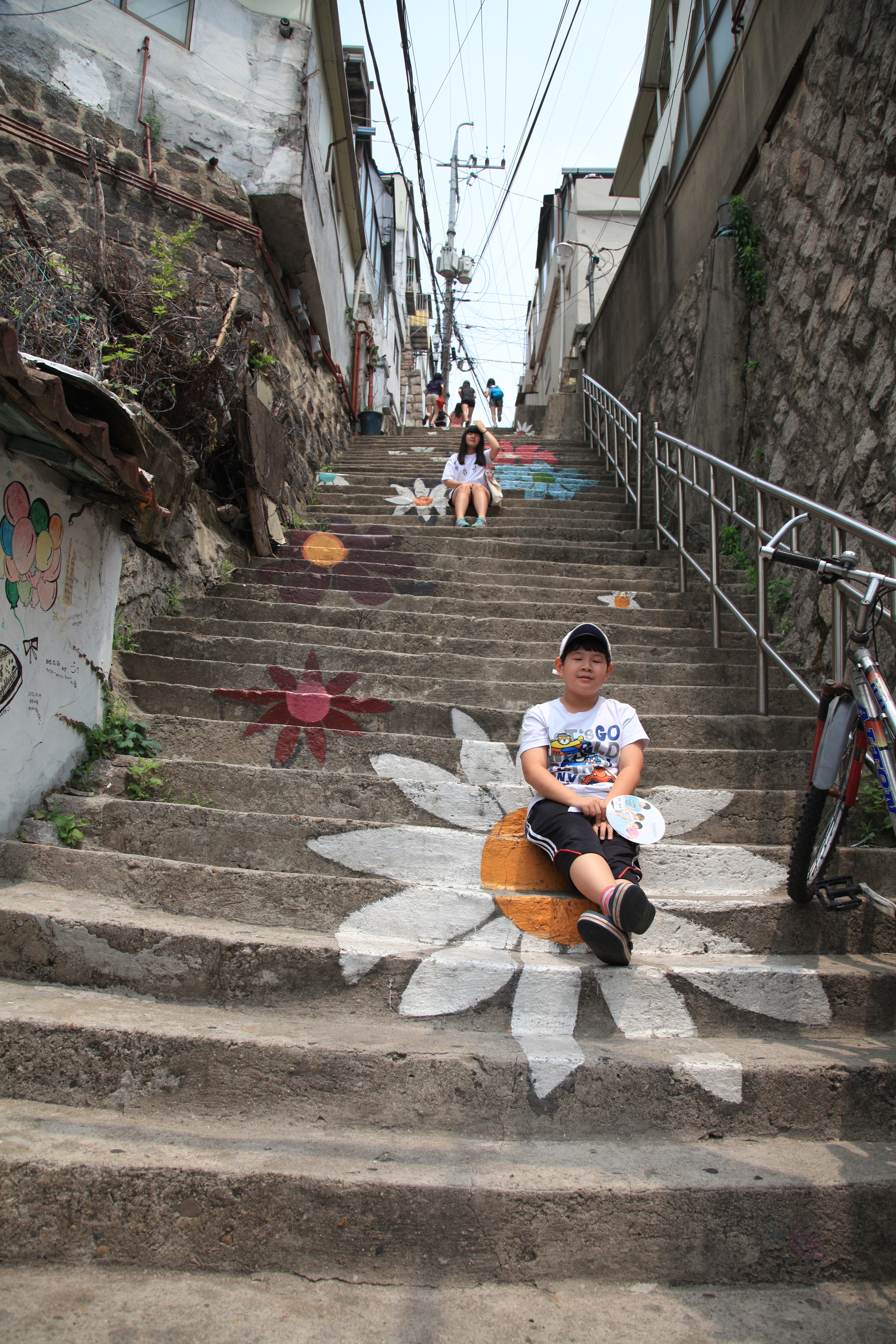
이화동 벽화마을

== See also ==
- Ihwa Mural Village
- Administrative divisions of South Korea
