= Jongno District =

District of Seoul, South Korea

Jongno
- Autonomous district
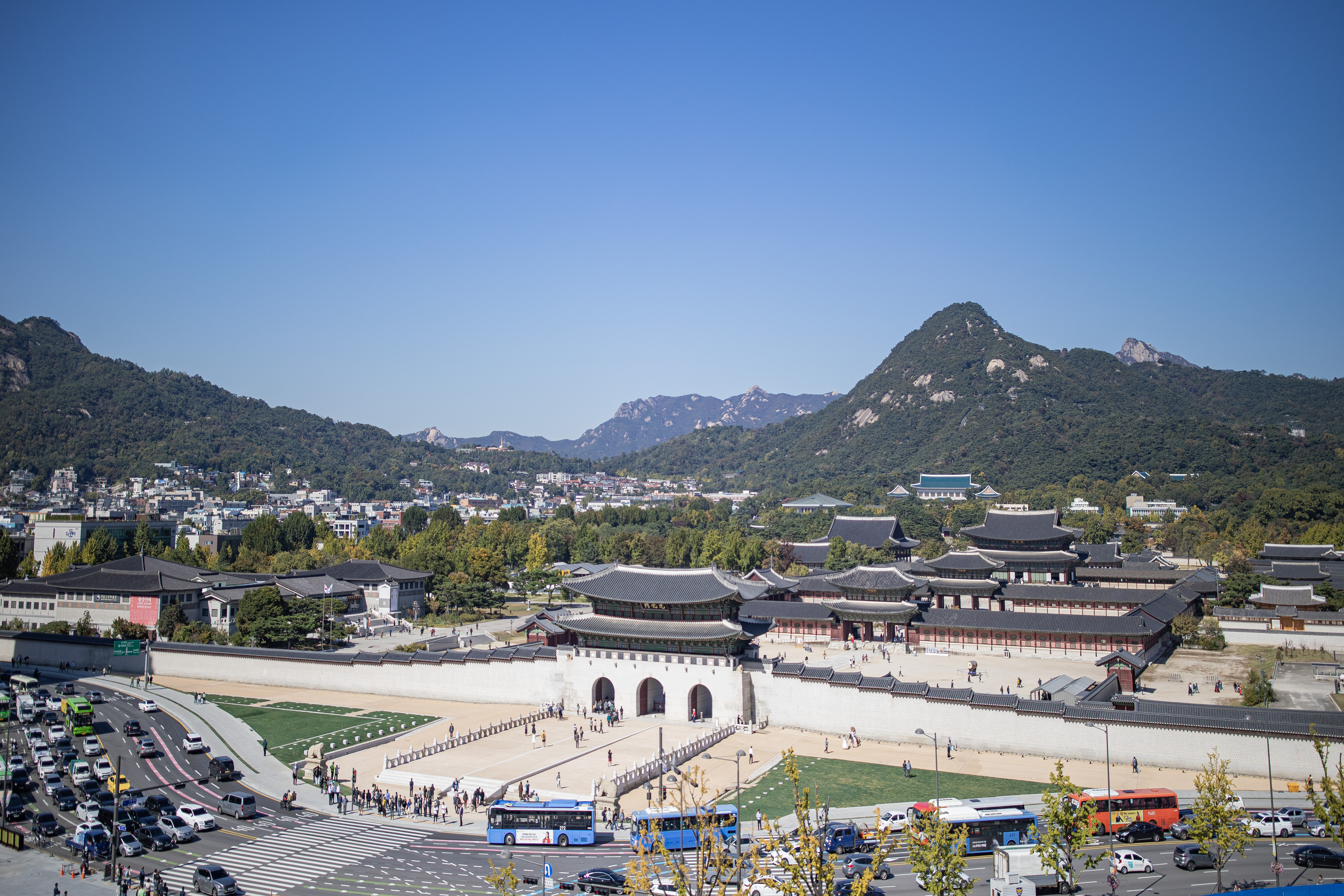
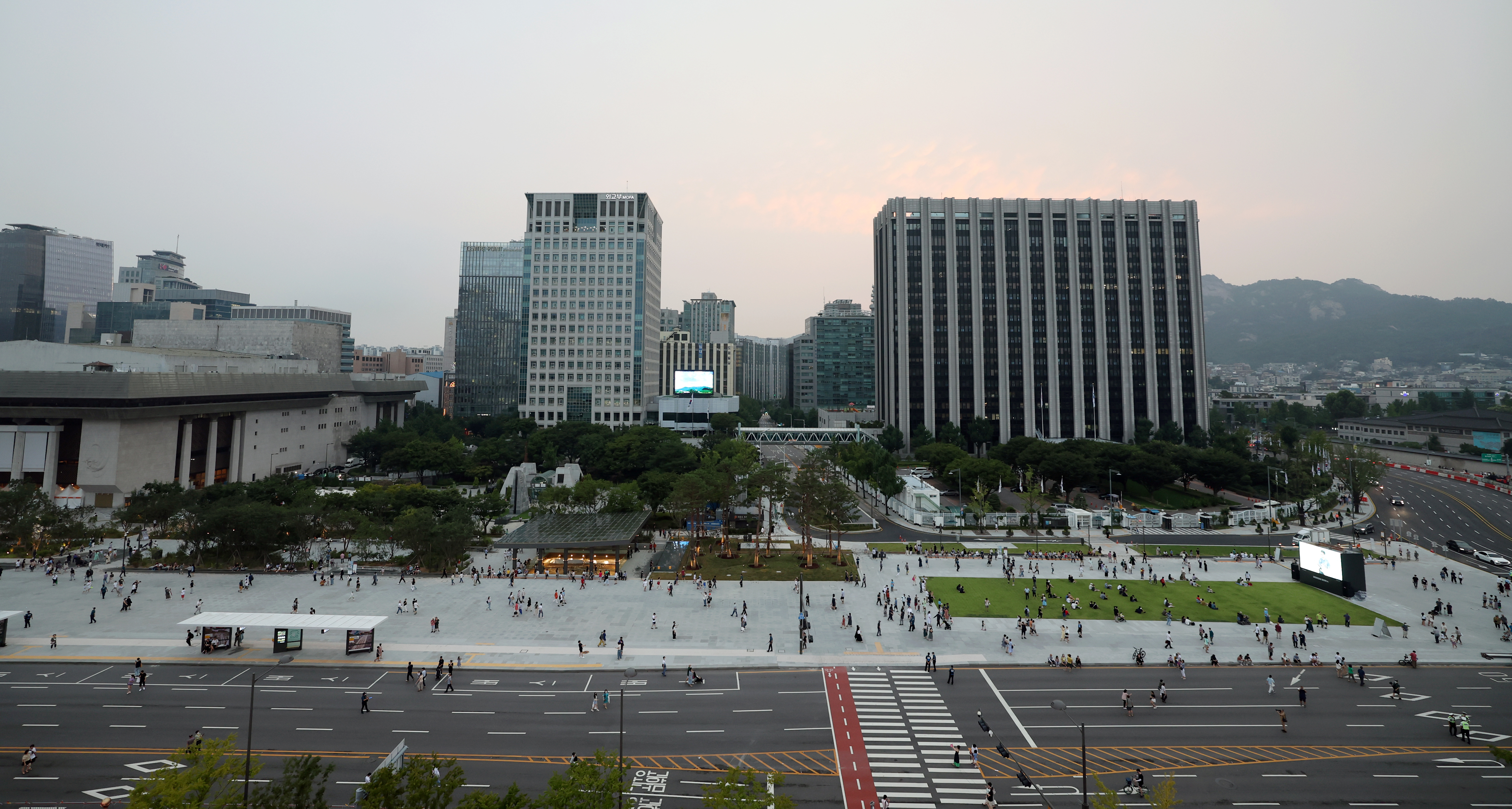
- Gyeongbokgung, with Bugaksan in the background Gwanghwamun Square

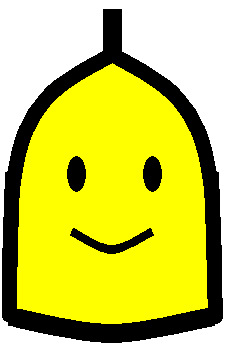
- Flag Seal

- Location of Jongno District in Seoul
- Interactive map of Jongno
- Coordinates: 37°35′58″N 126°58′29″E
- Country: South Korea
- Region: Sudogwon
- Special City: Seoul
- Administrative dong: 19

Government
  - Body: Jongno-gu Council
  - Mayor: Yu Chan-jong (Democratic)
  - MNA: Kwak Sang-eon (Democratic)

Area
  - Total: 23.92 km^{2} (9.24 sq mi)

Population (September 2024)
  - Total: 138,879
  - Density: 5,806/km^{2} (15,040/sq mi)
- Time zone: UTC+9 (Korea Standard Time)
- Postal code: 03000~03299
- Area code: 02-300,700
- Website: Jongno District official website

Korean name
- Hangul: 종로구
- Hanja: 鐘路區
- RR: Jongno-gu
- MR: Chongno-gu

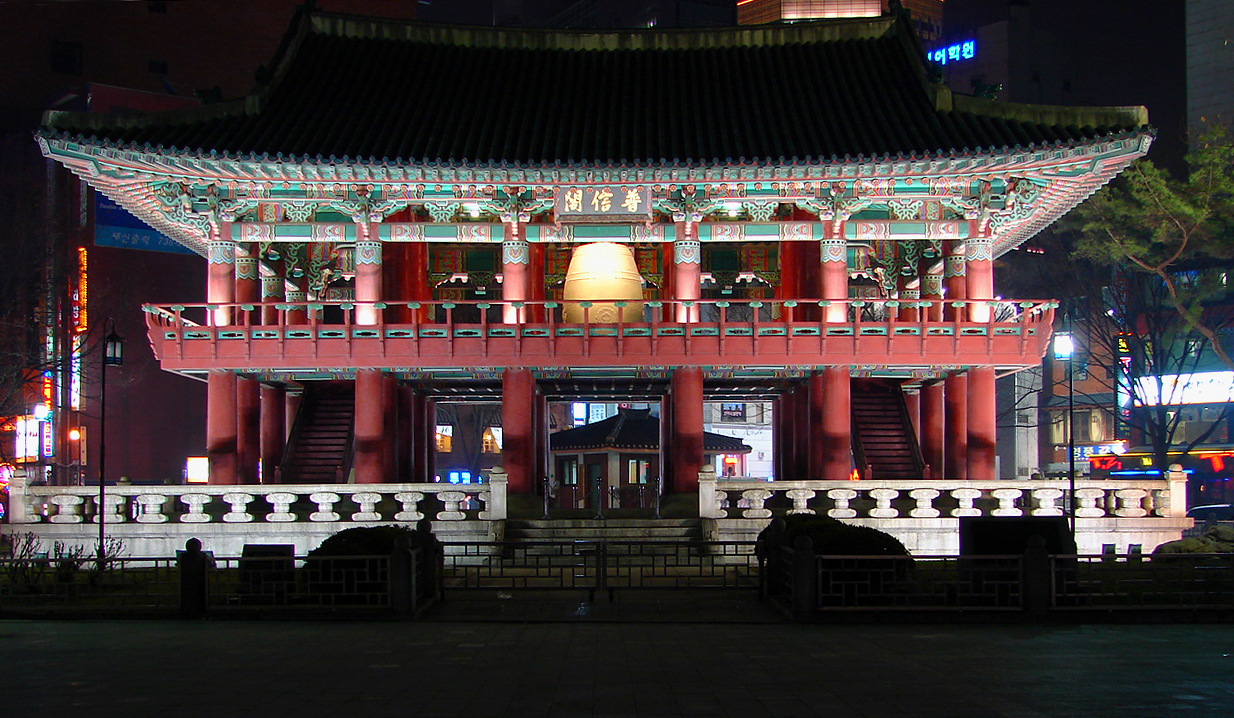
Bosingak bell pavilion

Jongno District (Korean: 종로구) is one of the 25 districts of Seoul, South Korea. It is the historic center of Seoul that contains Gyeongbokgung, the main royal palace of the Joseon dynasty, and Cheong Wa Dae (the Blue House), the presidential residence. Jongno District has a high concentration of historical sites, many dating back to the Goryeo period. Places like Sungkyunkwan, Gyeongbokgung, Changdeokgung, and Dongdaemun are all located within the area of the district.

== Etymology ==
Jongno means “Bell Street”, a major east-west road running through the center of the district named in reference to Bosingak belfry.

== Description ==
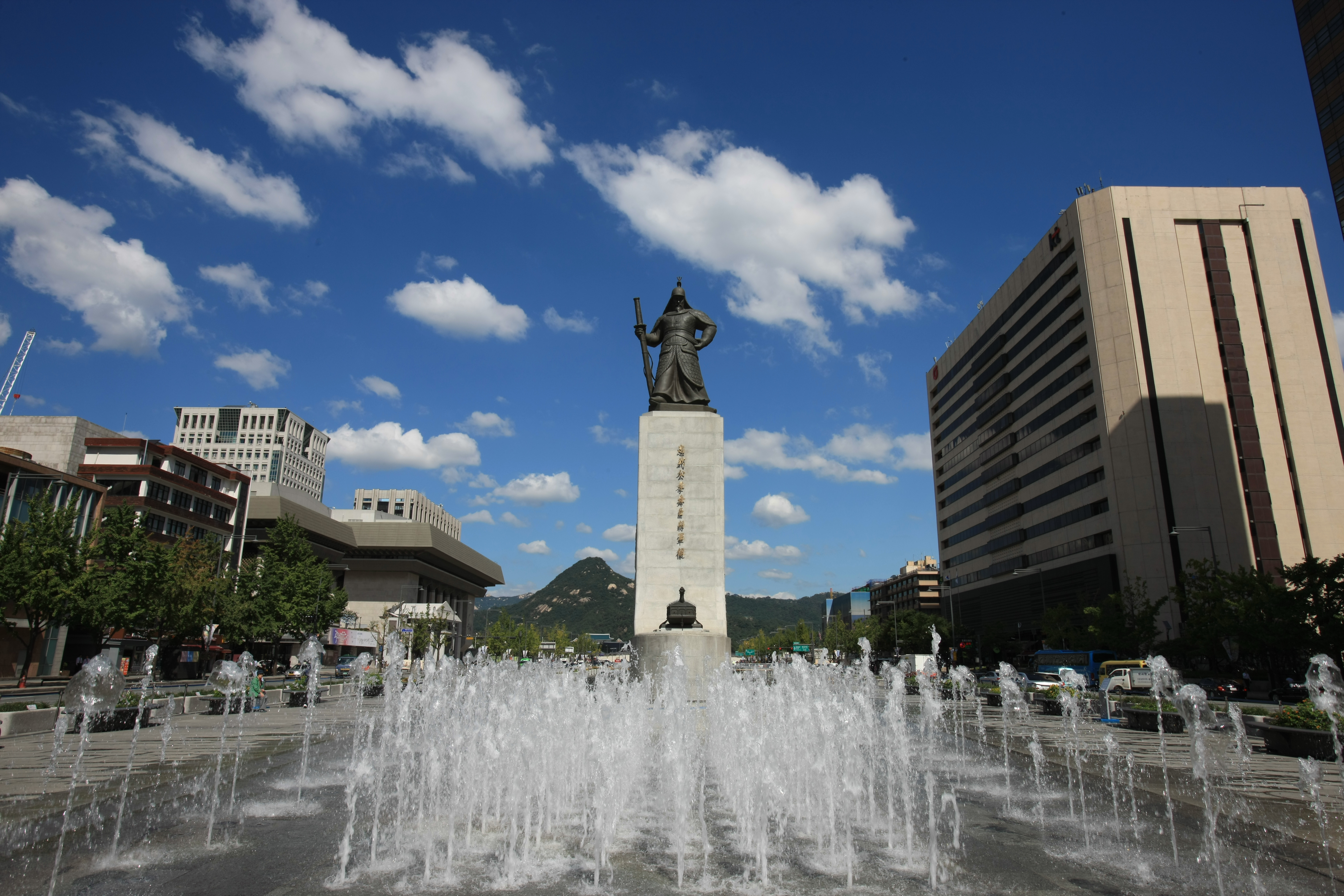
Gwanghwamun Plaza

Jongno has been the center of the city for 600 years since it was where the Joseon dynasty established its capital. The district is commonly referred to as the face and heart of Korea because of its important roles in politics, economics, culture, and history as the capital city. The district is home to palaces in which the kings used to reside and work, such as Gyeongbokgung, Changdeokgung, Changgyeonggung, and Unhyeongung. The South Korean president's former residence, the Blue House, is also located in the Jongno District.

Jongno is a popular tourist destination with attractions that include the restored Cheonggyecheon stream, the traditional neighborhood of Insa-dong, the Confucian Jongmyo shrine, and Jogyesa, the chief temple of the Jogye Order of Korean Buddhism. The district is also home to the Gwanghwamun Plaza which includes the statue of Admiral Yi Sun-sin and a statue of King Sejong. The district has a number of museums including Art Center Nabi and Gahoe Museum and is home to the main campuses of Sungkyunkwan University and Baewha Women's University.

== History ==
=== Hanyang ===
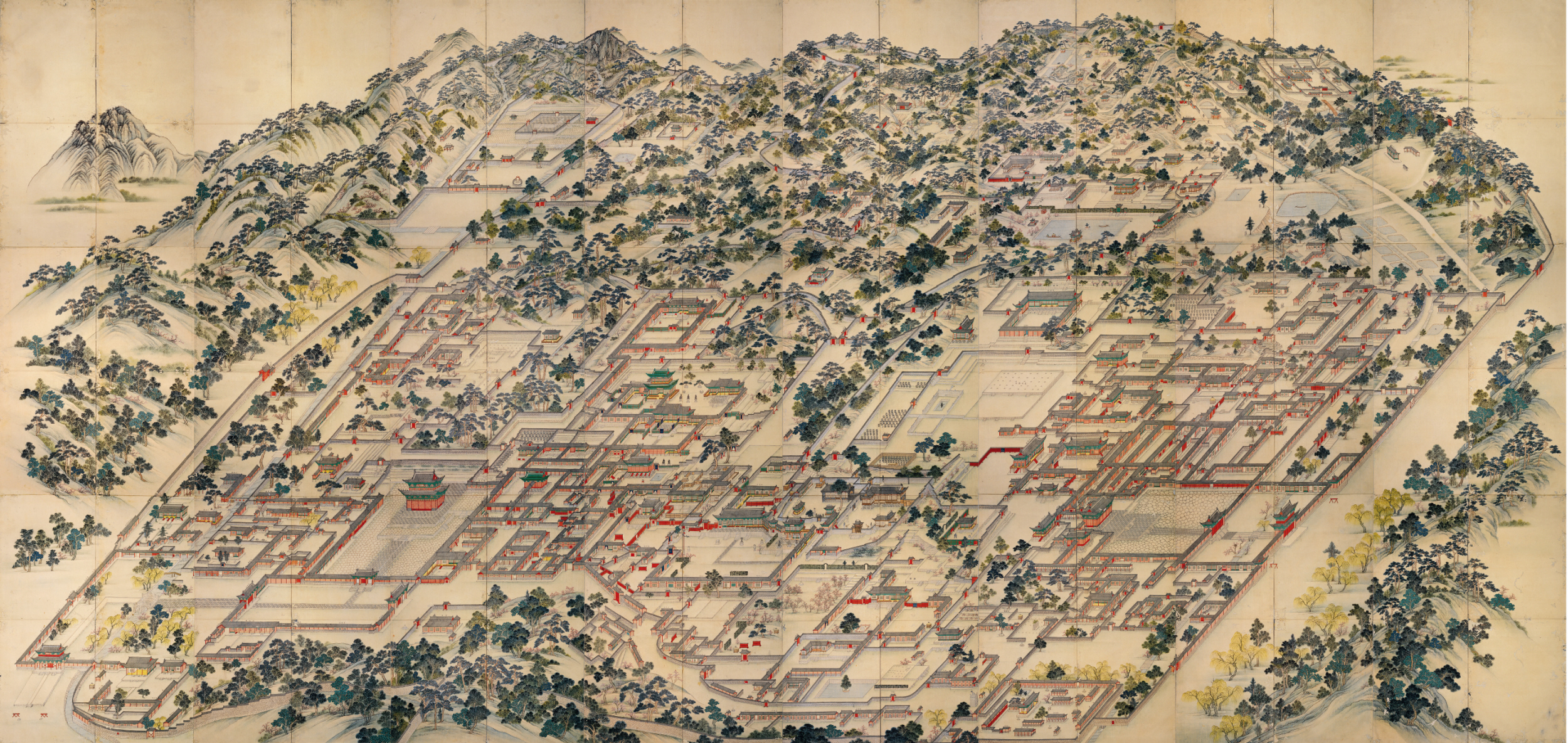
Donggwoldo, the landscape painting depicting the two royal palaces in Jongno.

Jongno was historically the center of Joseon and, later, the Korean Empire. It retained its prominence in the modern era after the establishment of South Korea. Hanyang, the capital of Joseon, included Jongno and the Jung District. In October 1394, King Taejo moved his capital from Gaegyeong to Hanyang. The capital of Goryeo, Gaegyeong, had a strong base of traditional forces against King Taejo. In addition, the topography divination theory states that the new dynasty was unlucky due to its failure, and that it also moved to Hanyang with regard to water transport of rice and military geographical conditions. Following the relocation of the capital city, the Joseon government pushed for the construction of Hanyang, starting with the construction of Jongmyo, Gyeongbokgung, and Changdeokgung. In 1395, it was renamed as Hanyang Department. In 1399, the first year of King Jeongjong's reign, the capital was moved to Gagyeong as a result of the Prince's rebellion. In 1405, the fifth year of King Taejong's reign, the capital was changed back to Hanyang. By King Sejong's time, the city grew into a large city with about 200,000 people.

== Economy ==
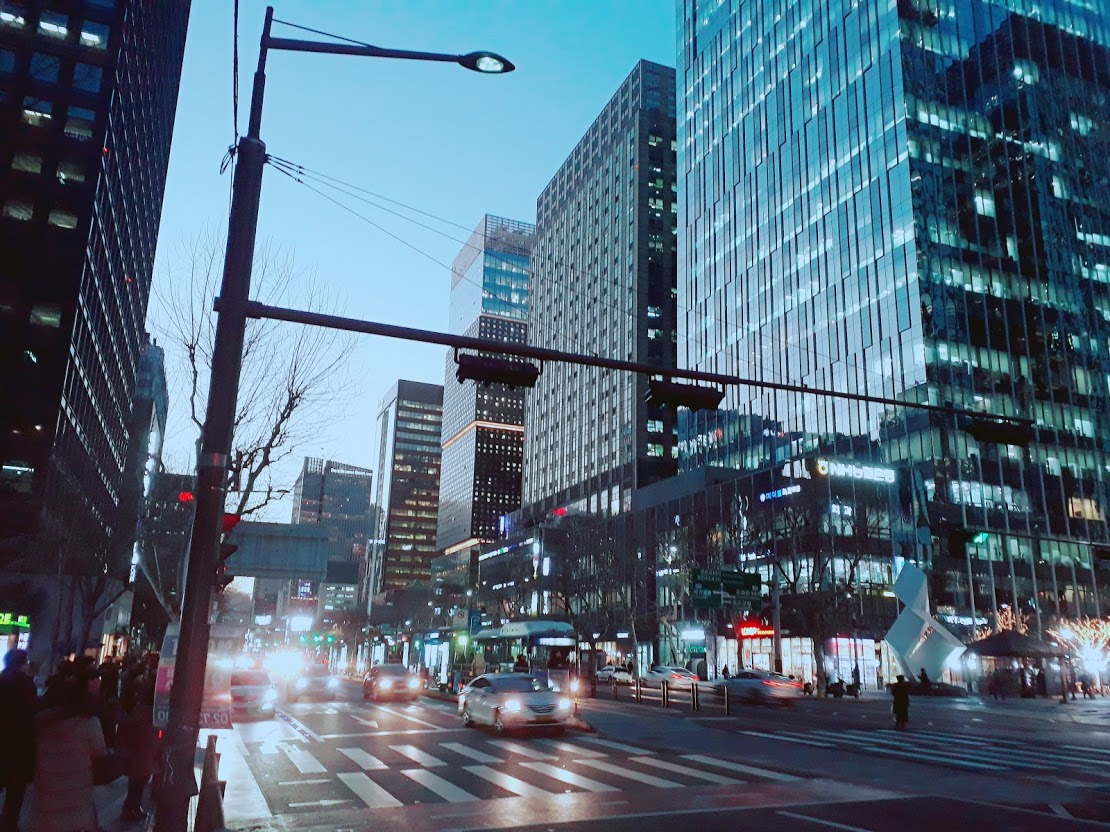
Jongno business district

As the traditional heart of Seoul, Jongno's central location continues to attract both local and foreign businesses and remains an important business district. Notable companies based in Jongno include Kumho Asiana Group, Kyobo Life, Lotte Group, SK Group, Hyundai Engineering & Construction, Daewoo E&C, Daelim Group, and East Asia Daily. The district also features numerous major business centers and office buildings as well as diplomatic missions.

The head office of Air Seoul is in the Kumho Asiana Main Tower on Sinmunno 1-ga.

== Culture and tourism ==
Tourism plays a major role in Jongno's economy. Several of the most well-known attractions are located in the district, as is Gwanghwamun Plaza which attracts huge numbers of tourists every year given its central location. In addition, the tourist areas of Insa-Dong and Bukchon Hanok Village also attract huge numbers of visitors. Another popular tourist destination is Gwangjang Market, previously called Dongdaemun Market. It is one of the oldest traditional markets in the country and is visited by approximately 65,000 each day.

== Politics and government ==
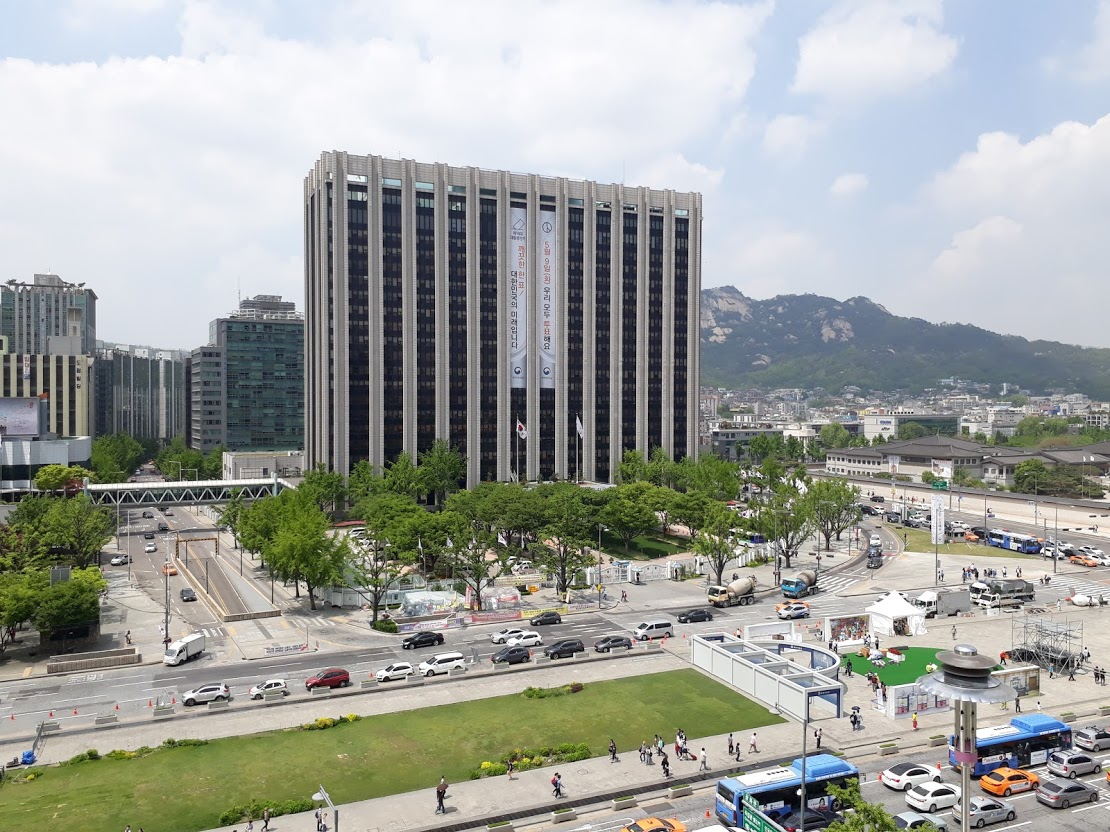
Central Government Complex main building.

Jongno is considered the most important district in South Korean politics as it is located in the heart of Seoul, and thus in the heart of South Korea. The district was the home to the Blue House (Cheongwadae), the official residence of the president of South Korea, until 2022. It is also home to two of the three largest plazas in Seoul, the first being Gwanghwamun Plaza and the other being Cheonggye Plaza, making the district the first constituency to appear in the National Election Commission's election statistics and exit polls for every nationwide election. Because of the district's political significance, every political party carefully selects its own candidate to run in every election and even most minor parties nominate their candidates to run in the district while they choose not to nominate candidates for other constituencies in Seoul.

Jongno has elected three presidents to represent it in the National Assembly: Yun Posun, Roh Moo-hyun and Lee Myung-bak. Although Jongno is a district, its residents are entitled to elect their own mayor and form their own district council, as 25 districts in Seoul——including Jongno——have city-equivalent status. The City of Seoul has province-equivalent status and its mayor is regarded as a cabinet-minister-level position. The mayorship is regarded as a higher position than all other provincial governors as these positions are regarded as deputy minister level positions.

The district has been traditionally regarded as a conservative stronghold in Seoul as Seoul natives and wealthy people used to form a majority in terms of resident numbers in towns such as Pyeongchang, Samcheong-dong, Sajik-dong, Jongro 1, and Jongro 4. However, as Democrats began to gradually gain power in the Sudogwon region in the 2010s and eventually made the region their stronghold, the party also gained power in the district due to the votes of Sungkyunkwan University students in Hyehwa-dong and residents of relatively lower income in towns such as Changsin-dong and Sungin-dong.

As of June 2020, the district was regarded as Democratic stronghold, as are many other constituencies in Seoul. The district was represented by Lee Nak-yon, a Democrat, former Prime Minister and leader of his party, who resigned his office to run for the Korean presidency; the city government was led by Kim Yeong-jong, a Democrat three-term mayor who served from July 2010 to November 2021.

The conservative People Power Party made a comeback in the district when Choi Jae-hyung was elected as National Assembly member for Jongno in the March 2022 by-elections. In the subsequent local elections in June, Chung Moon-heon, a member of the same party, was elected mayor.

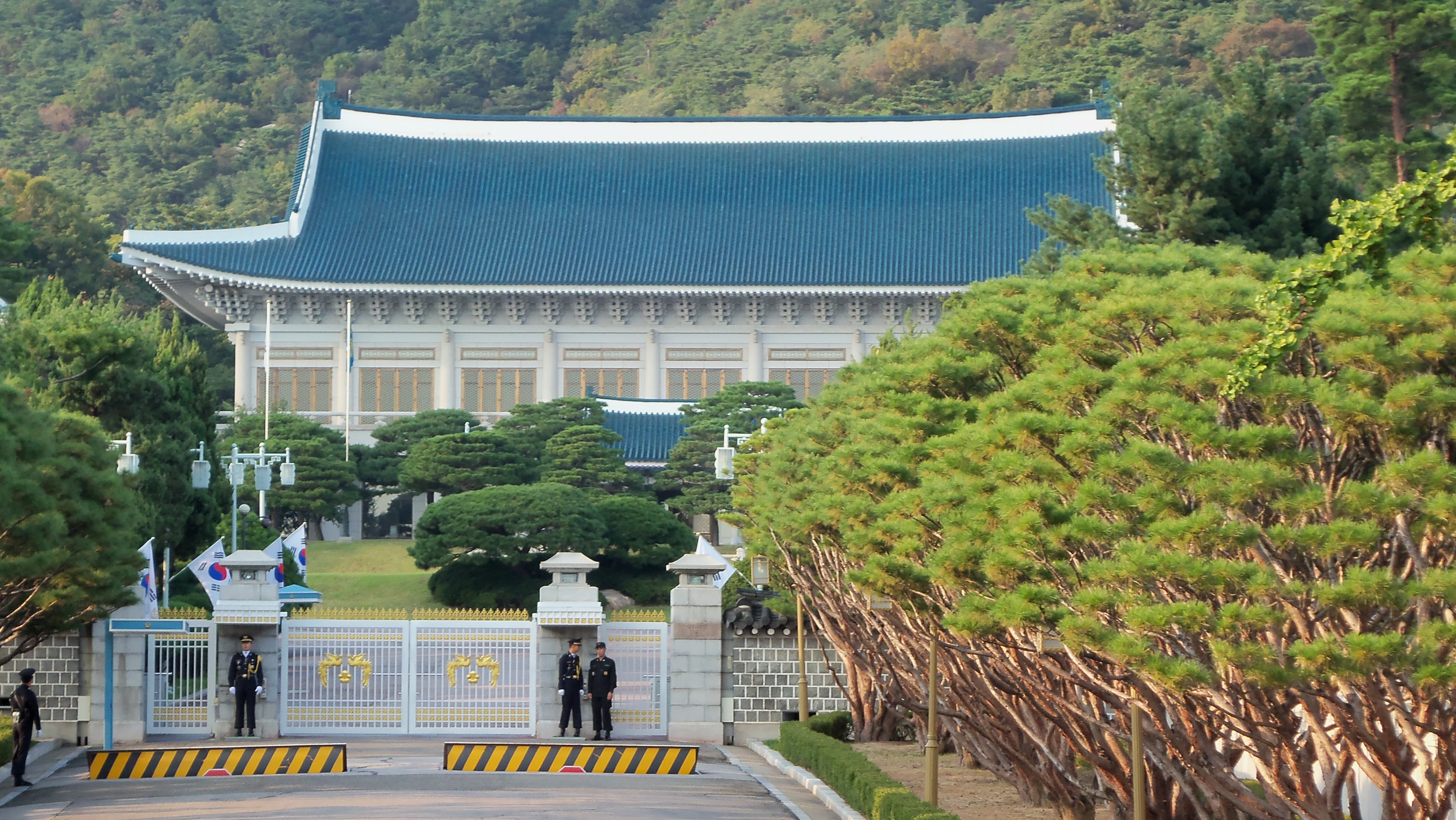
Cheongwadae

The headquarters of the Ministry of Security and Public Administration is located in the Seoul Government Complex in Jongno District. The third and fourth floors of the same building house the Ministry of Unification.

The headquarters of the Ministry of Foreign Affairs is located in the MOFA Building in Jongno District.

Previously, the Ministry of Education had its headquarters in the Central Government Complex in Jongno District. The Ministry of Culture, Sports and Tourism also had its headquarters in Jongno District. The Ministry of Health and Welfare had its headquarters in the Hyundai Building. The offices of those ministries have moved to Sejong City. Before it merged into another ministry in 2008, the Ministry of Maritime Affairs and Fisheries was also located in Jongro-gu. It was re-established in Sejong City.

== Diplomatic missions ==
Being at the center of the city, the district hosts the following foreign embassies.

- Australia
- Austria
- Brazil
- Brunei
- Colombia
- Czech Republic
- Equador
- Finland
- Holy See
- Honduras
- Ireland
- Israel
- Japan
- Jordan
- Marshall Islands
- Mexico
- Oman
- Panama
- Papua New Guinea
- Poland
- Portugal
- Switzerland
- United States
- Venezuela
- Vietnam

== District Council ==
The District Council serves administrative functions such as Foreign Seal Registration, International Marriage, Adoption, Acknowledgement reports and Alien Registration Certificates for foreigners residing in Jongno District. In 2022, the current mayor is Chung Moon Hun.

== Subdivisions ==
Administrative divisions

Those are some of the district administrative dongs (행정동). For a complete list, see here.

- Cheongun hyoja-dong (청운효자동 淸雲孝子洞)
- Sajik-dong (사직동 社稷洞)
- Samcheong-dong (삼청동 三淸洞)
- Buam-dong (부암동 付岩洞)
- Pyeongchang-dong (평창동 平倉洞)
- Muak-dong (무악동 毋岳洞)
- Gyonam-dong (교남동 橋南洞)
- Gahoe-dong (가회동 嘉會洞)
- Jongno-1.2.3.4 ga-dong (종로1.2.3.4가동 鍾路1.2.3.4街洞)
- Jongno-5.6 ga-dong (종로5.6가동 鍾路5.6街洞)
- Ihwa-dong (이화동 梨花洞)
- Hyehwa-dong (혜화동 惠化洞)
- Changsin 1-dong (창신1동 昌信洞)
- Changsin 2-dong (창신2동 昌信洞)
- Changsin 3-dong (창신3동 昌信洞)
- Sungin 1-dong (숭인1동 崇仁洞)
- Sungin 2-dong (숭인2동 崇仁洞)

== Attractions ==
Attractions in Jongno District
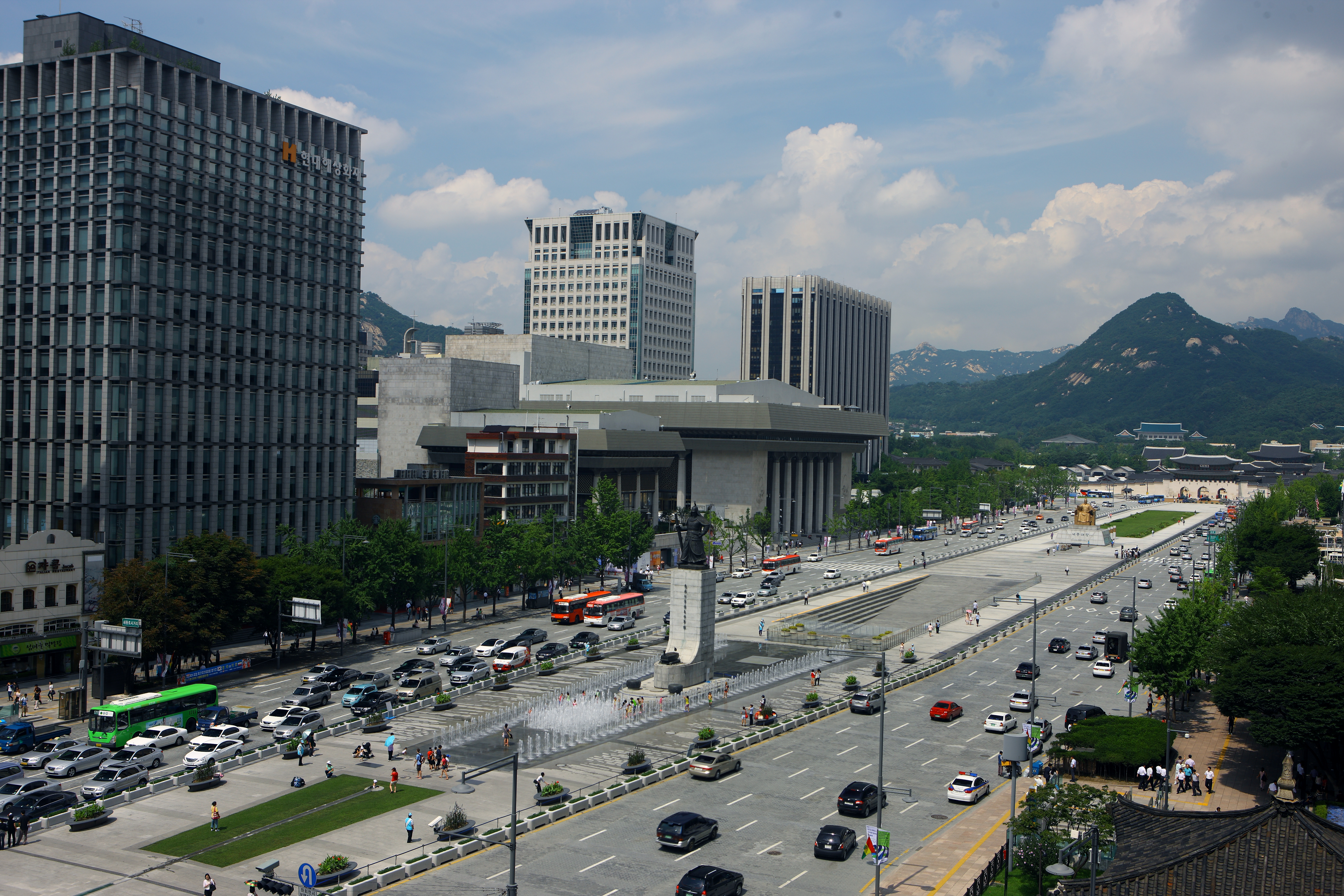
Gwanghwamun, with Sejong Arts Center the Ministry of Foreign Affairs in the center, and Gyeongbokgung and Bukhansan to the right.

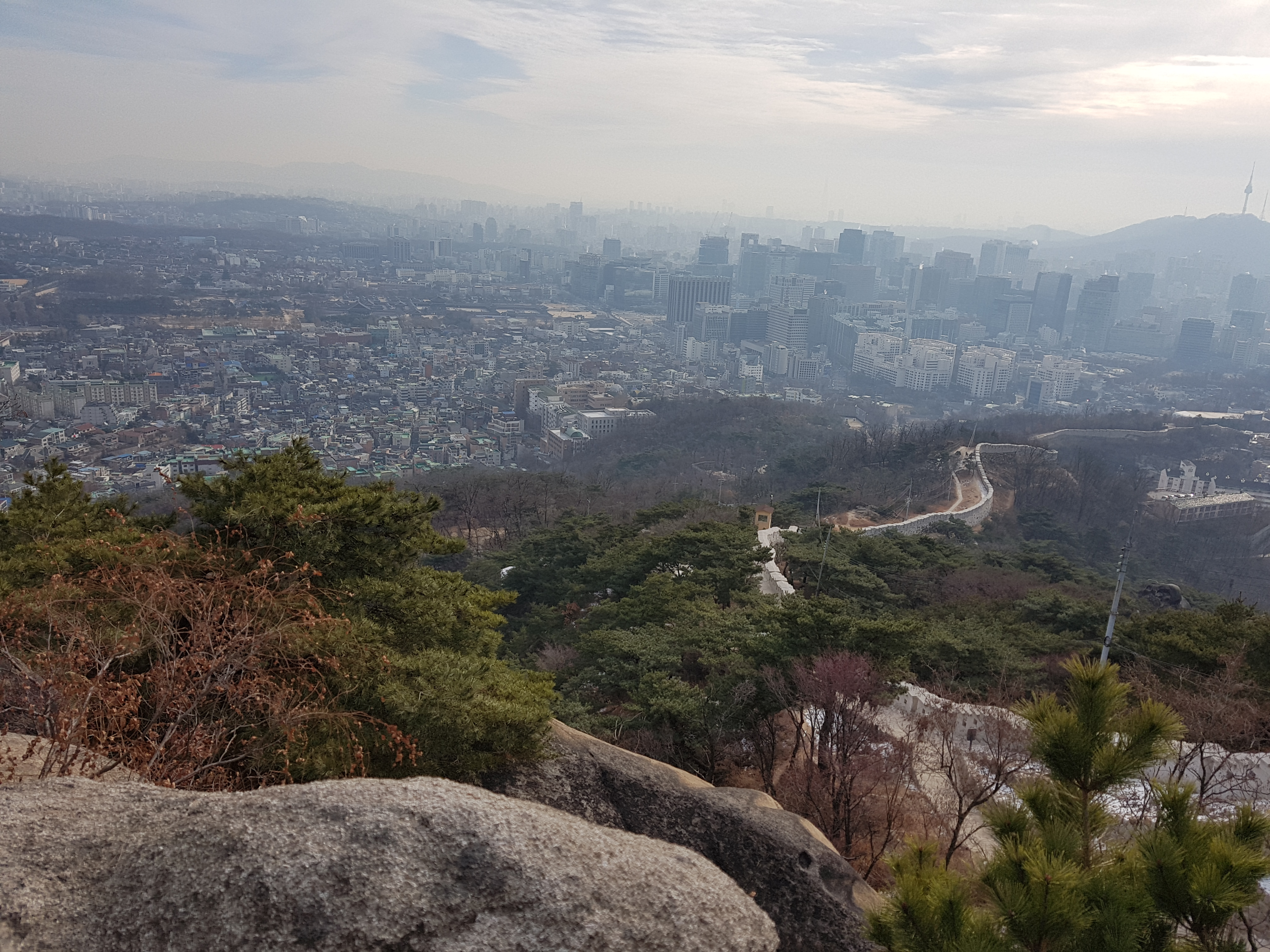
View of the city from Inwangsan

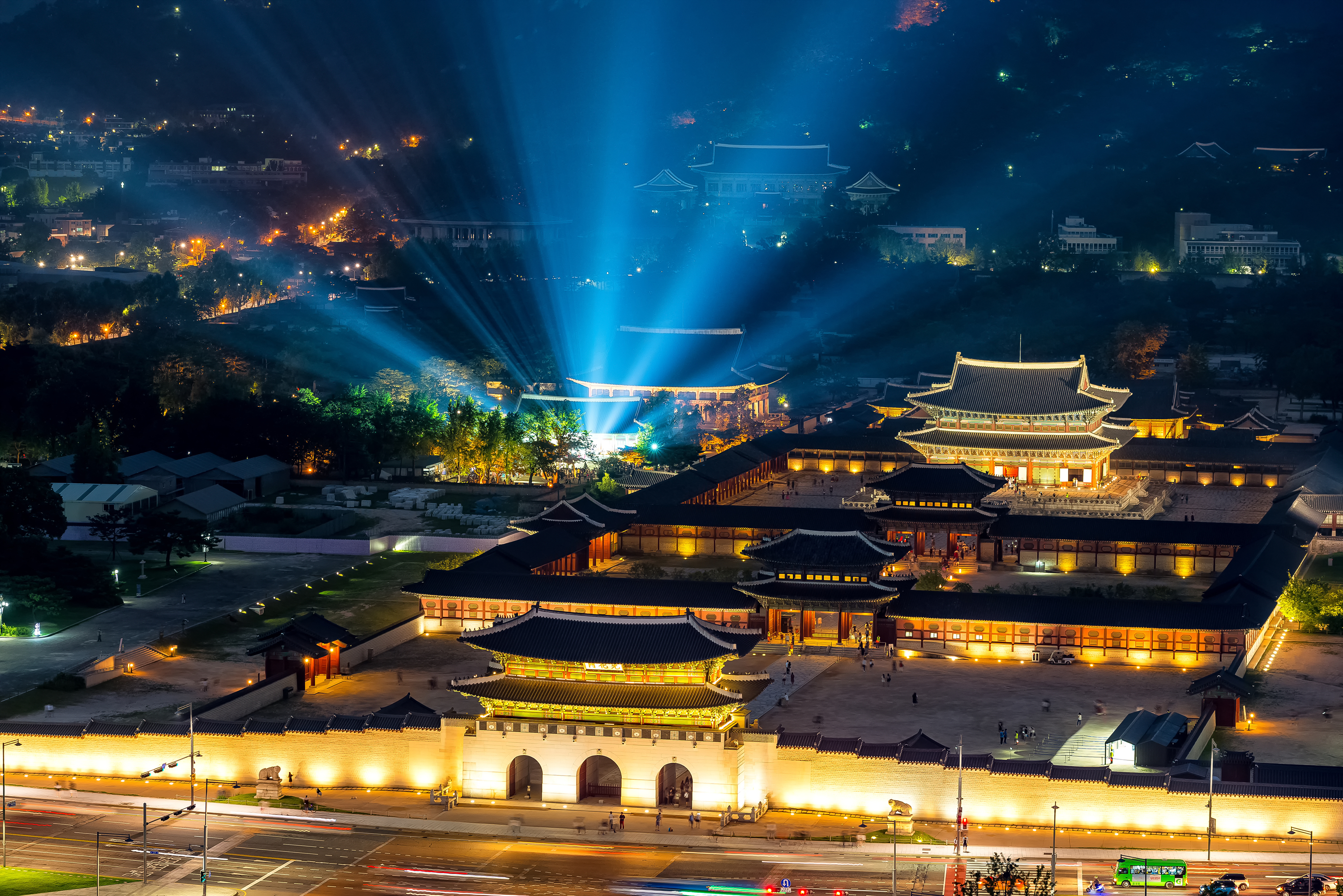
Gyeongbokgung at night.

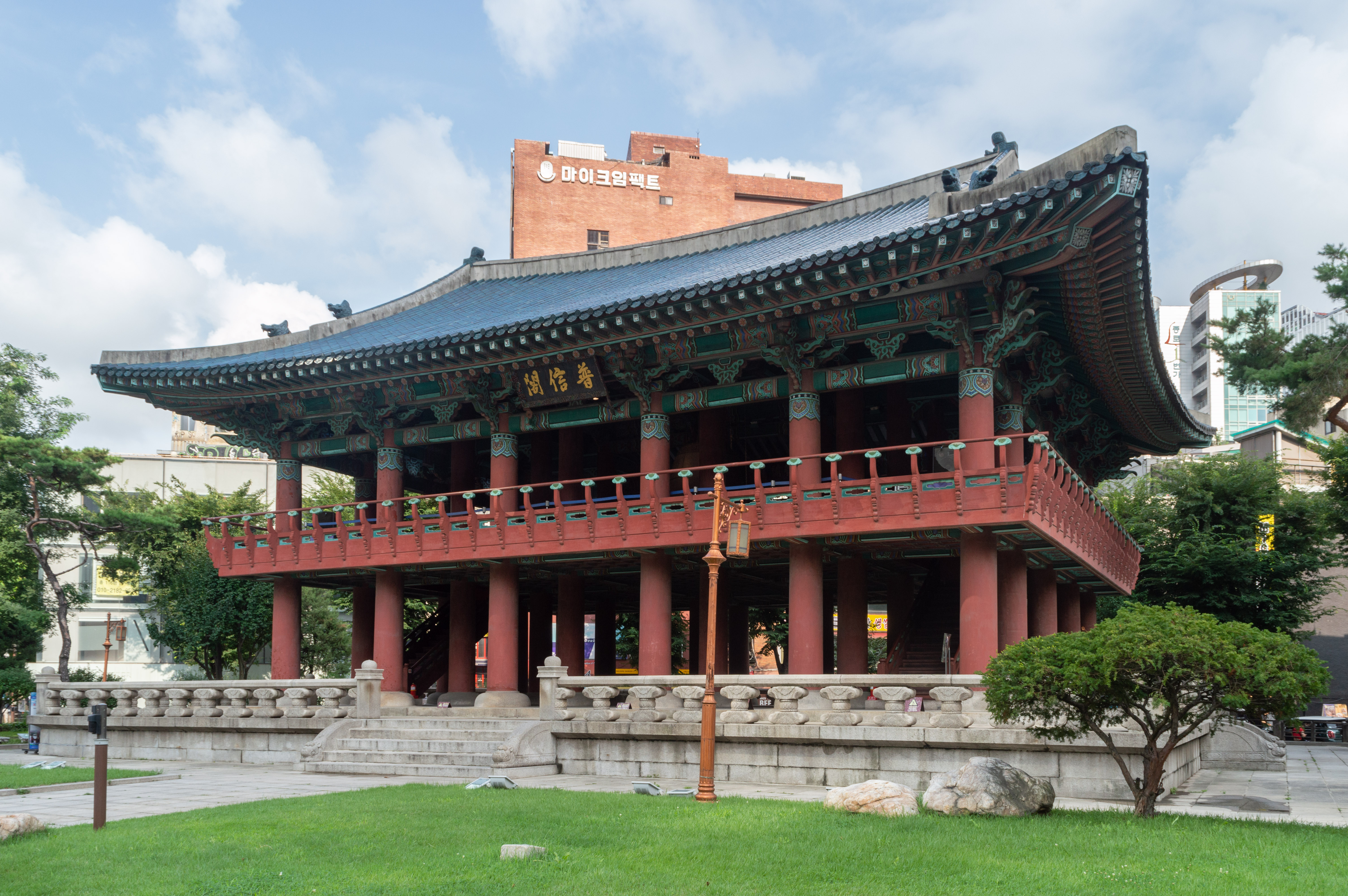
Bosingak Belfry, located at Jonggak intersection.

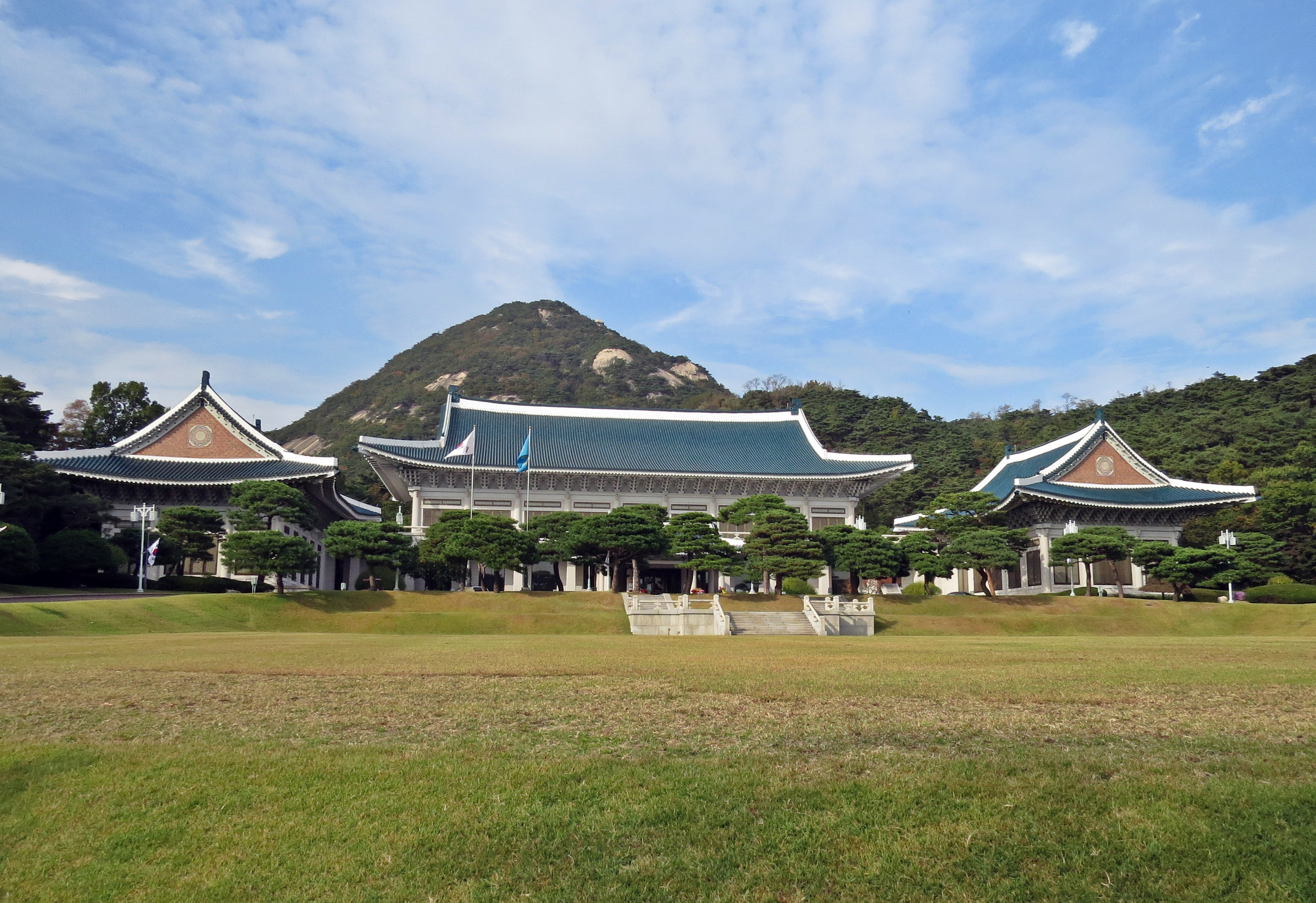
The Blue House, the former residence of the president

== Education ==
- Universities
  - Catholic University of Korea, Songsin Campus (Private)
  - Sangmyung University (Private)
  - Sungkyunkwan University (Private)
  - Seoul National University, Yeongeon Campus (Public)
  - University of North Korean Studies (Private)
- High schools
  - Kyungbock High School (Public)
  - Seoul Arts High School (Private)
  - Seoul Science High School (Public)
- International schools
  - Lycée International Xavier (Private) : Available for both elementary and secondary education.
  - Seoul Global High School (Public)

== Sister cities ==
- From 1995, Dongcheng District, Beijing, People's Republic of China
- From 1996, Sükhbaatar District, Ulaanbaatar, Mongolia
- From 1999, Lancaster, Pennsylvania, United States
- From 2013, San Miguel de Allende, Guanajuato, Mexico
- From 2015, Prague 1 Municipal District, Czech Republic

== See also ==
- Geography of South Korea
- Subdivisions of South Korea
