= Downtown Seoul =

Historic and social center of Seoul, South Korea

- City Centre and Central business district
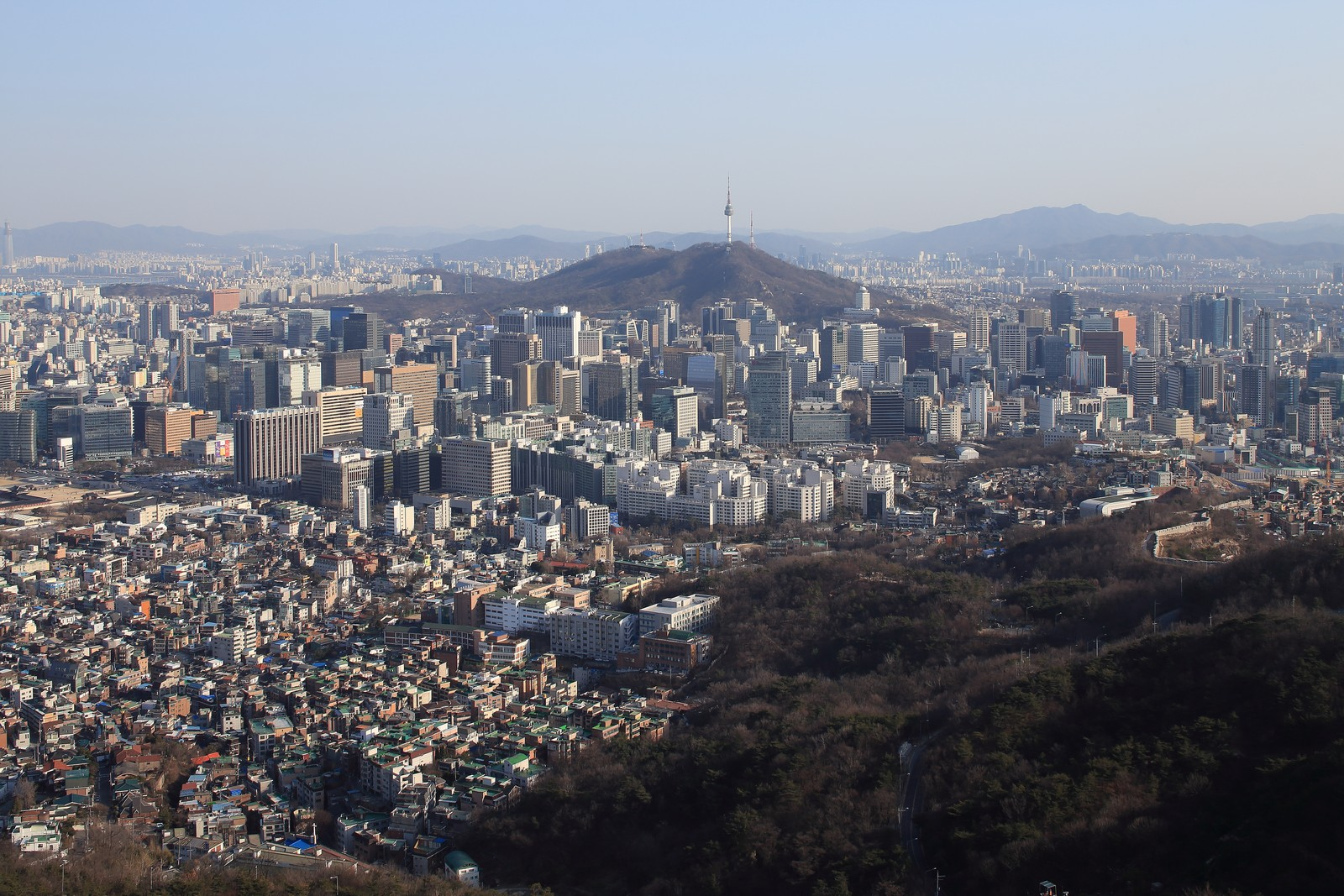
- Picture of Downtown Seoul taken from Inwangsan, 2015
- Nicknames: Seoul Central Business District, Sadaemun-An
- Interactive map of Downtown Seoul
- Location within Seoul
- Coordinates: 37.5722099°N 126.9768146°E
- Country: South Korea
- City: Seoul Special City

Area
  - Total: 17.9 km^{2} (6.9 sq mi)

Population (2015)
  - Total: 106,162
  - Density: 5,930/km^{2} (15,400/sq mi)

Korean name
- Hangul: 서울 도심; 서울 시내
- Hanja: 서울 都心; 서울 市內
- RR: Seoul dosim; Seoul sinae
- MR: Sŏul tosim; Sŏul sinae

Downtown Seoul (Korean: 서울 도심; 서울 도심부; 서울 시내), also known as Seoul Central Business District or Sadaemun-An, is traditional city center and central business district of Seoul, located through Gwanghwamun of Jongno District and Seoul Station of Jung District along the Sejong-daero and Jong-ro. For its time-honored and unique geographic status in Seoul, the downtown is usually just called the Central Business District (Seoul CBD), or sometimes Gwanghwamun Business District for the landmark 'Gwanghwamun' at the heart of it.

== History and status ==
=== Joseon ===
Seoul in the age of Joseon was called Hanyang (or by official name of its administrative division and governing authority Hanseong-bu). As it was a walled city, presence of the Seoul City Wall made great influence on imagined geographies of Seoul, like the London Wall surrounding Londinium. By the Seoul City Wall, Hanseong-bu was divided into two regions; an urban downtown space named as Seong-jung (성중; 城中) or Doseong-an (도성 안; lit. 'inside the capital city wall') area inside the city wall, and peripheral areas named Seongjeosimni (성저십리; 城底十里) which was a ring-shaped region 10 ris (Korean mile) outside of the City Wall.

Seoul was a planned capital of the Joseon, as geographic embodiment of Confucianism. The cityscape of Hanseong-bu's downtown area was also created by adaptive cultural diffusion of Confucianism. According to Confucian classics, construction of capital city (도성; 都城) should follow several Confucian principles on city planning. For example, Rites of Zhou instructs principle of '左祖右社 面朝後市' (좌조우사 면조후시), which means 'With the main palace at the center, Confucian royal ancestral shrine (祖) goes to the left, Altar of Soil and grain (社) to the right, cabinet buildings (朝) to the front, and marketplace (市) to the behind'. Following this Confucian instruction, Jongmyo and Sajikdan were placed on the left and the right of the main palace Gyeongbokgung. Also, Six Ministries, cabinet of the Joseon government was placed right in front of Gyeongbokgung's main gate Gwanghwamun. Government buildings and official residences for the Six Ministries were built on both sides of the road just outside of the Gwanghwamun, and the road was called Yookcho Street (육조거리; lit. 'Street for the Six Ministries' or 주작대로; lit. 'Mainstreet of the Vermilion Bird'). However, Joseon could not place the official marketplace behind Gyeongbokgung, because the main palace Gyeongbokgung was built almost right in front of the mountain Bugaksan. So Joseon had to detour instructions from Rites of Zhou, by building the only licensed-official market in Seoul, the Sijeon, along the Unjongga (now Jongno street), which was southeast side (front side) of the main palace.

This adjusted city planning in early Joseon created continuous commercial area in form of east-west axis around the Jonggak belfry, starting from southern end of the Yookcho Street to eastern end of the Unjongga (located near present-day Wongaksa Pagoda). This traditional cityscape of Hanyang city's downtown area is still continued even in present-day Seoul, even through two major wars (Japanese and Qing invasion) in Joseon dynasty, colonial governance of Japanese Empire, and the Korean War after liberation. Government Complex Seoul along the Sejong-daero (former Yookcho Street), and headquarters of largest companies around Jongno are clear examples of such time-honored history and tradition.

=== Korean Empire ===
In reign of the Korean Empire, the name of Seoul was Hwangseong (황성; 皇城, meaning 'City of the Emperor'. Structural modernization in cityscape of Hwangseong's downtown area was started during initial decade of the Korean Empire, when the empire sustained political autonomy. For example, from 1898 to 1904, when the Korean Empire maintained autonomy in state governance, tram (1899) and electric street light (1900) were first introduced to Downtown Seoul's cityscape. Also, the Korean Empire's first Emperor Gojong relocated substantial parts of main palace's function from Gyeongbokgung to Deoksugung, and introduced modern railway transportation. These reforms led to strategic expansion of roads connecting Gyeongbokgung, Deoksugung and the Seoul Station, creating another important cityscape in downtown Seoul as form of north-south axis.

However, as the Korean Empire lost substantial autonomy after signing Treaty of 1905, Japanese colonial officials began to drive cityscape reconstruction. Spatial reorganization in this early colonial period was targeting subordination of Korean Empire's royal government and advancing authority of colonial government. Some of notable tough reforms during this period includes reconstructing royal palaces into public parks and zoo, and modernizing city roads.

=== Colonial Korea under Japanese rule ===
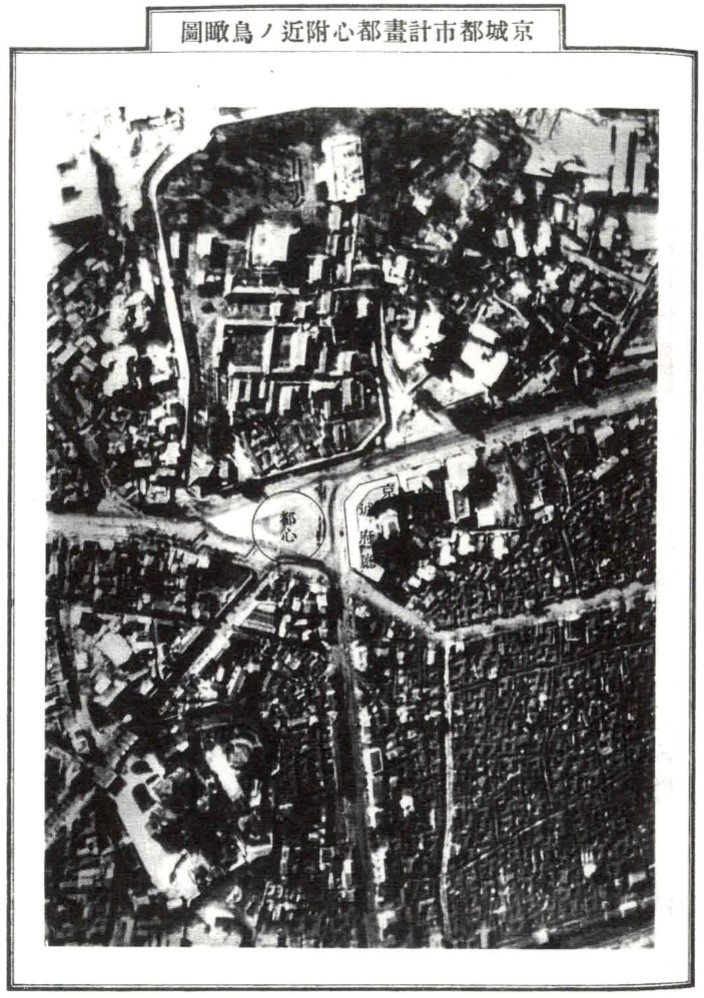
In 1928, local government of Keijō designated the front yard of City Hall as its geographic city center (都心), where Seoul Plaza is today.

Although the area of Downtown Seoul inside the city wall had maintained a single integrated urban sphere for about 600 years through Joseon dynasty and Korean Empire, Japanese Government-General on Colonial Korea divided Keijō's downtown area into two modern administrative divisions of Keijō in 1943; Jongno District and Jung District. This abrupt division explains why it is hard to explain pre-modern history of Jongno District and Jung District separately.

Abrupt partition of Downtown Seoul's urban structure by Japanese colonial government was influenced by ethnic distribution inside the area. During the early periods of Colonial Korea, most of Japanese people were living in southside of the Cheonggyecheon inside the City Wall, an area named by Koreans as Namchon (남촌; lit. 'Southern village'), compared to Bukchon (북촌; lit. 'Northern village') where most of influential Koreans were living in. Despite the actual geographic dissociation between Japanese and Korean were getting mitigated over time, this geographic stereotype later encouraged local government of Keijō-fu to divide area of Downtown Seoul into Jongno District and Jung District, according to natural boundary of the Cheonggyecheon. Most of Keijō's influential economic institutions were newly constructed in southside of the Cheonggyecheon, even famous in the current names of Myeong-dong and Sogong-dong. Key examples of these buildings include Bank of Chōsen and Keijō Post Office. In contrast, native Korean people lived in relative squalor in Bukchon, an area to the north of Cheonggyecheon. The famous hanok town in Bukchon Hanok Village, created from the 1910s to 1930s during the colonial period, is one of symbolic space showing such ethnic disparity inside modern Keijō.

Yet it is remarkable that the colonial government's reconstruction of Keijō was not solely driven by interests of Japanese people living in Colonial Korea, because the colonial government sincerely wanted to assimilate entire Joseon's geographic culturescape under modern Japanese influence. While Japanese people in Keijō demanded reconstruction of the city to be centered in their main residential area alongside of the 'Honmachi' (now Chungmu-ro), colonial government intentionally pursued absorbing iconic Korean spaces outside of Honmachi into modernized Japanese architecture. Clear example of what Chōsen's colonial government intended is found in construction of Government-General of Chōsen Building, built right in front of Gyeongbokgung, which is northern part of Cheonggyecheon. This building, constructed during 1912 to 1926, was directly targeting reorganization of traditional integrated downtown space from main palace Gyeongbokgung to government buildings of Six Ministries around Yookcho Street.

=== South Korea ===
==== '50s and '60s: Liberation and Korean War ====
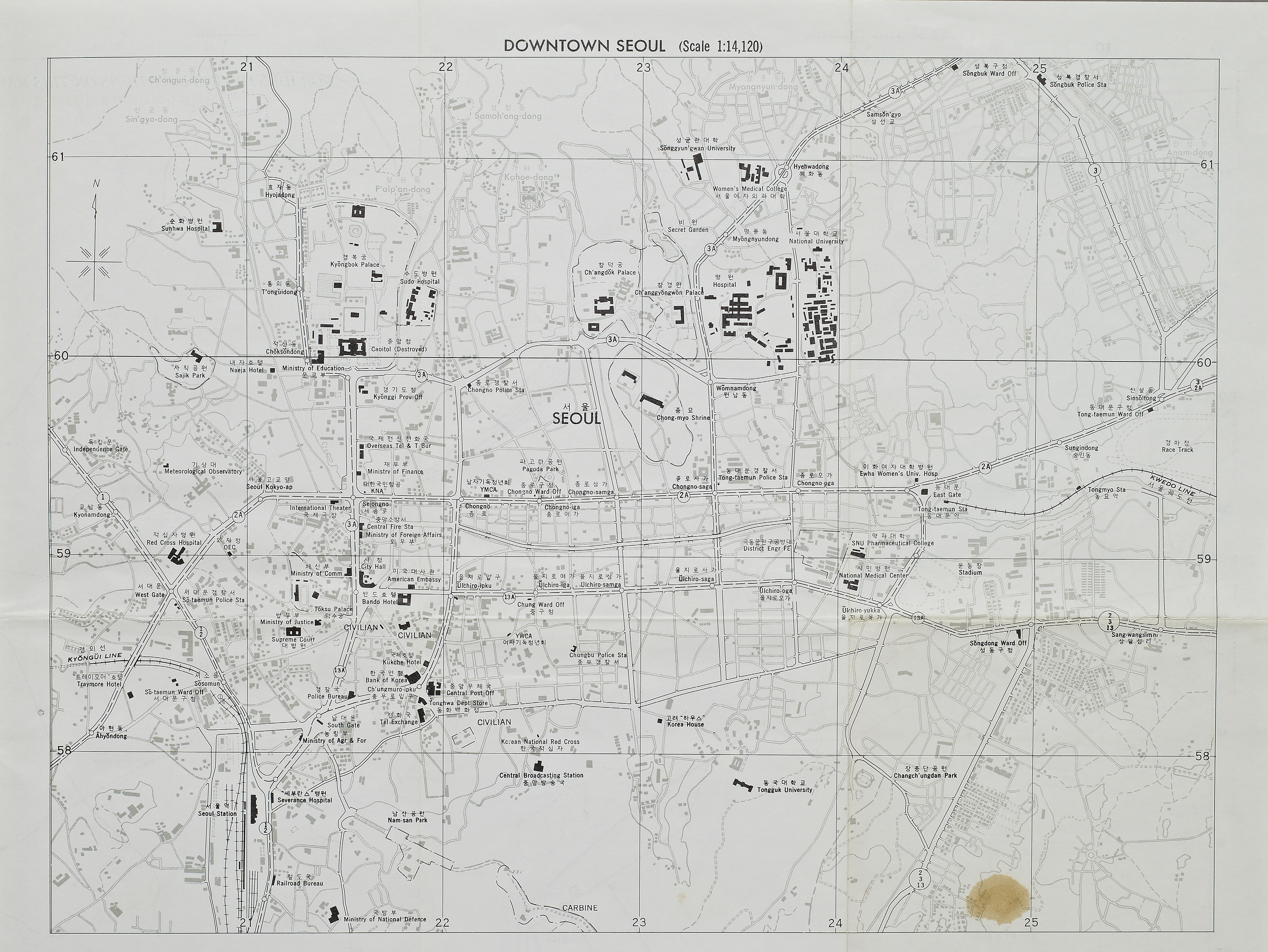
Map of Downtown Seoul made by Army Map Service in 1950

Even though the Japanese colonial government intentionally divided Keijō's downtown area into Jongno District and Jung District, its 600-years old spatial integration as Doseong-an still demanded a broad term encompassing two administrative divisions together. During the Korean War, a tragic civil war initiated by Kim Il Sung five years after Korea's liberation, United States army sent to Korea began to call this area as Downtown Seoul.

Fortunately, though some of dongs (Korean unit of neighborhood) suffered huge destruction, major areas of Downtown Seoul could evade bombardments during the Korean War. Eight neighborhoods (among approximately 400 neighborhoods) were redeveloped into modern grid patterned city blocks, due to heavy destruction during the war. Myeong-dong is one of such neighborhood. Former head of South Korean delegation to Japan in 1950, Kim Yong-ju (金龍周) claims that he was the one who advised General McArthur at the SCAP, Japan, not to bomb major areas in Downtown Seoul.

As Downtown Seoul survived harsh bombardments during the Korean War, its valuable historic sites such as Gyeongbokgung and Jongmyo could be preserved as cultural heritages. However, it also meant that even severely outdated old towns outside of Japanese modernization survived to modern day South Korea. This excessive long history of Downtown Seoul's old town area discouraged urban regeneration in the 1950s as there were too many stakeholders left, creating tragedy of the anticommons. Turning point for urban redevelopment came when the United States president Lyndon B. Johnson visited Seoul in the 1960s. Koreans were upset when their traditional heart of the Seoul city was projected in foreign TV screens as outdated old town, and this public discontent propelled redevelopment of Downtown Seoul as national initiative. Several laws for urban redevelopment to overcome severe tragedy of the anticommons were legislated starting from the 1960s, including forceful institutions such as eminent domain by designated private developers. Yet since South Korea in the 1960s were still emerging and developing country, redevelopment program for Downtown Seoul could not draw enough resources.

==== '70s and '80s: Urban redevelopment and decentralization ====
Built 1977 in front of the Seoul Station, Daewoo Group's headquarters building is a landmark symbolizing 1970s of South Korea's rapid growth. It is now named as 'Seoul Square'.

Urban regeneration occurred in the 1970s and '80s, when South Korea got developed enough to attract capital investments for such a program. The excited national atmosphere of preparing for the Asian Games of 1986 and Summer Olympics of 1988 provided chances for investors. Lots of landmark office and hotel buildings in the cityscape of Downtown Seoul were built around this period, such as the Koreana Hotel (built in 1971 along Taepyeong-ro), the headquarters building for Daewoo Group (built in 1977 along Toegye-ro), and the headquarters building for Kyobo Life Insurance Company (built in 1980 along Sejong-ro).

A priority target of urban regeneration during this period was turning Downtown Seoul from a disorganized mixture of residential and commercial districts into a homogenous central business district. Thus, one of its main goals was discouraging settlement populations in Downtown Seoul. Forced relocation of prestigious secondary schools (i.e. Kyunggi and Whimoon High School) from Downtown Seoul to the Gangnam region was a symbolic project to achieve this goal. The national government strongly supported such a relocation project through a bundle of policies called 'Equalization policy for high schools' (고등학교 평준화 정책). Under this policy, the entrance exam for high school was abolished, and a lottery system for entrance was introduced. Yet there were restrictions for chances to enter this lottery; middle school graduates could apply for admission to high schools only near their homes. These policies prompted enthusiastic Korean parents, who wanted their children to get admission to renowned high schools by municipal lottery, to move to the Gangnam region, thus decreasing demand for housing inside Downtown Seoul. Also, this project eventually supplied vacant space available for commercial development, which were left by relocated secondary schools. The total space created by this project was approximately 27 hectares, and most of the lots were filled by high-rise office building developments. For example, the empty site left by Whimoon High School at Jongno District was developed into the headquarters building for Hyundai Group in 1986.

It is notable that even though government-led redevelopment of all of Seoul in the 1970s and '80s was trying to decentralize Downtown Seoul's unrivaled function of central business district to Gangnam and Yeouido, it continuously kept growing as business district, as it was Seoul's only and the most long-established city center. This continued economic growth of Downtown Seoul is often explained as it was the only place which could satisfy face-to-face contacts among traditional governmental and economic elites in Seoul. Core regions in Downtown Seoul, such as Myeong-dong of Jung District and Jongno-dong of Jongno District, are the uppermost central part of Seoul still today.

==== '90s and '00s: Renaissance of Seoul's old soul ====
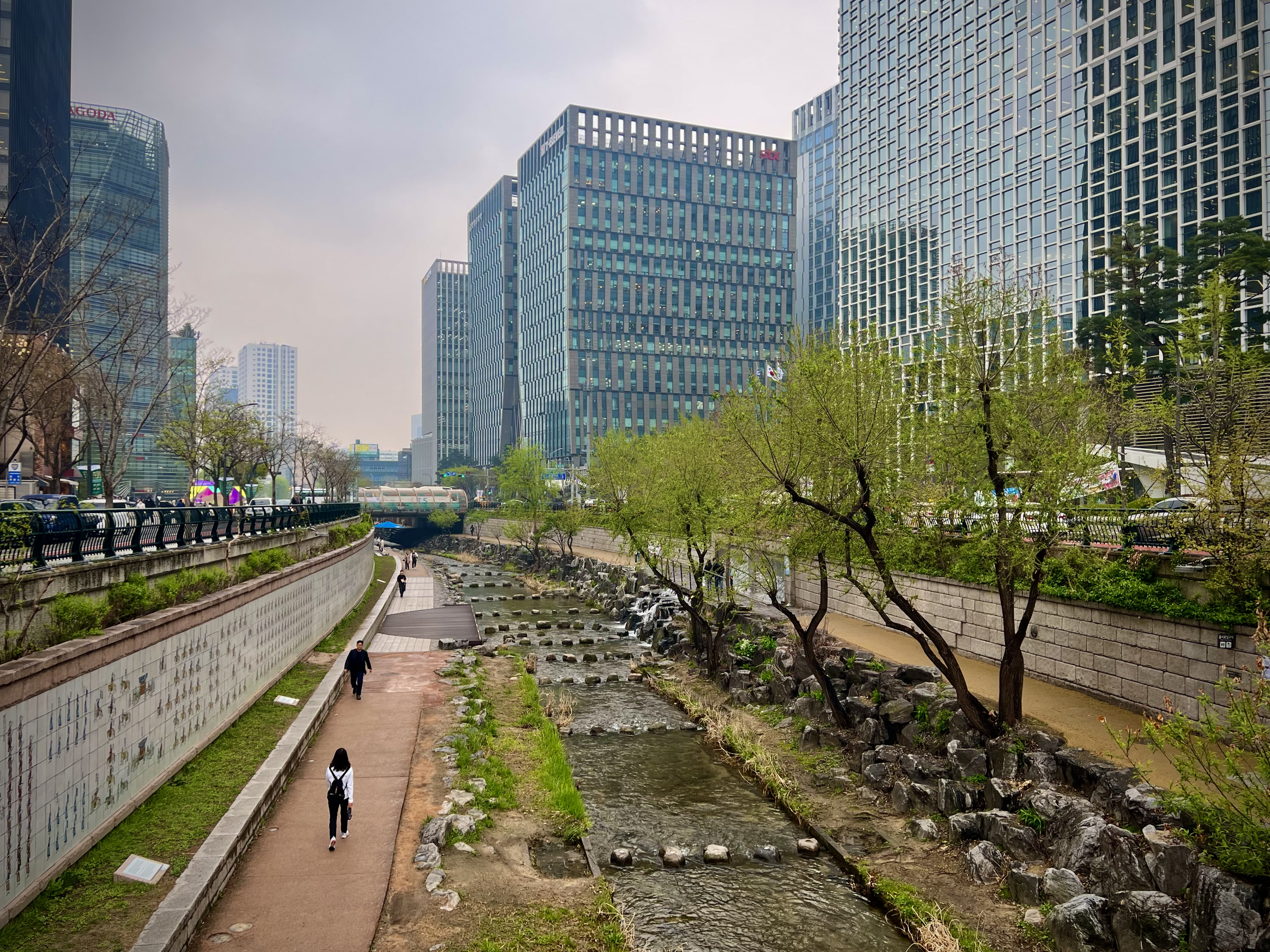
Restored in 2004, walled by high-rise office buildings on both side, standing as an eco-friendly linear park of stream between Jongno District and Jung District, the Cheonggyecheon is a soul of 21st-century Downtown Seoul.

Downtown Seoul in the late 20th century experienced apparent change in its function, as planned by urban regeneration policies in the 1970s and '80s. Decentralization policy made in those days successfully suppressed high demand for living in downtown area, thus Downtown Seoul successfully turned from mixture of pre-modern residential and commercial area into a relatively homogeneous central business district. For instance, its settlement population continued to decline dramatically. Jongno District's number of residents was 265,342 in 1985. It dropped to 154,043 in 2005, recording approximately a 42% decline. The same thing happened to Jung District, as it declined from 208,085 in 1985 to 126,679 in 2005. Policy measures kept promoting the supply of large office buildings through the '90s, when the height restriction law was not as rigorous as today. Major examples of office buildings constructed in this period include SK Building for SK Group (built in 1999) and Jongno Tower for Samsung Group (built in 1999).

However, demand for more fundamental change was standing before Downtown Seoul in the dawn of the 21st century. One of such pivotal momentum came from growing worldwide recognition of Korean culture in the '90s. Jongmyo and Changdeokgung, both located in Jongno District and designated as UNESCO World Heritage Sites in the late 1990s, are clear examples of such recognitions, indicating South Korea was becoming a globally preferred tourist destination. This changing environment pushed social demand to develop tourism for Downtown Seoul by rediscovering cultural legacies. Restoration of Namsan mountain's scenic landscape by demolishing disorderly piles of buildings around it, and restoration of Gyeongbokgung's cultural landscape by dismantling Government-General of Chōsen Building in front of it, are two symbolic projects implemented to rediscover Downtown Seoul's cultural sceneries in the '90s. Completed in 2005, Cheonggyecheon stream is another unique example for projects rediscovering sceneries of Downtown Seoul. The historic stream was blocked in the 1950s, and it flowed under overpass roads in the 1970s. Restoring such traditional stream inside the downtown area was the right project for Mayor Lee Myung-bak, who sought his own mayoral legacy with eco-friendly spirit. After overpass roads were torn down and the waterway was reopened, Cheonggyecheon became a famous tourist attraction, and nearby air quality also improved.

== Planning, boundary and denotation ==
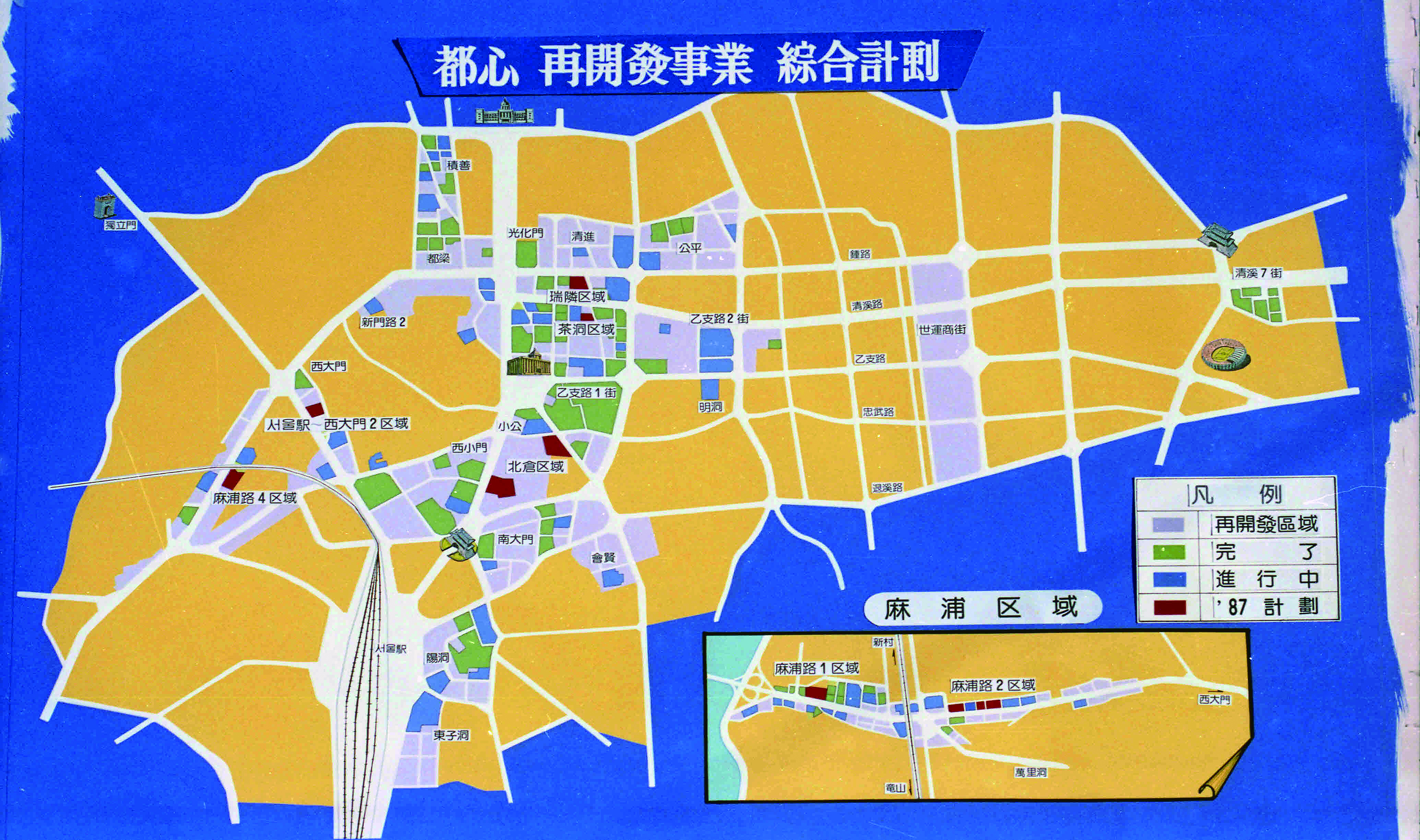
Figure 1. Scope of areas under Seoul's downtown redevelopment (도심 재개발사업; 都心 再開發事業) in 1987

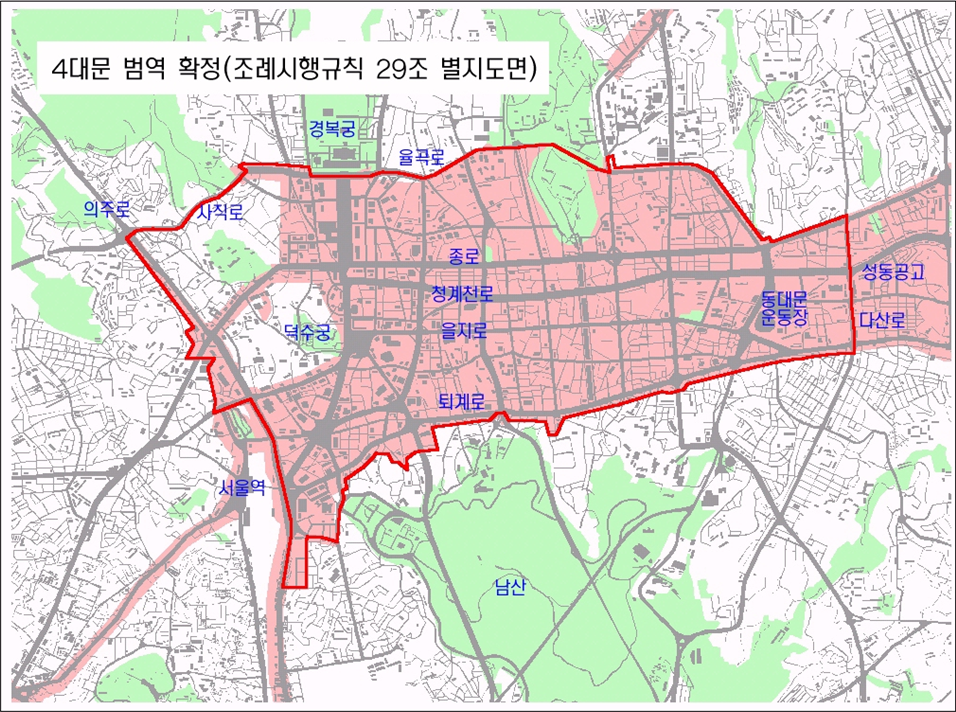
Figure 2. Administrative boundary of Downtown Seoul (Sadaemun-An, 사대문안) between 2000 and 2015

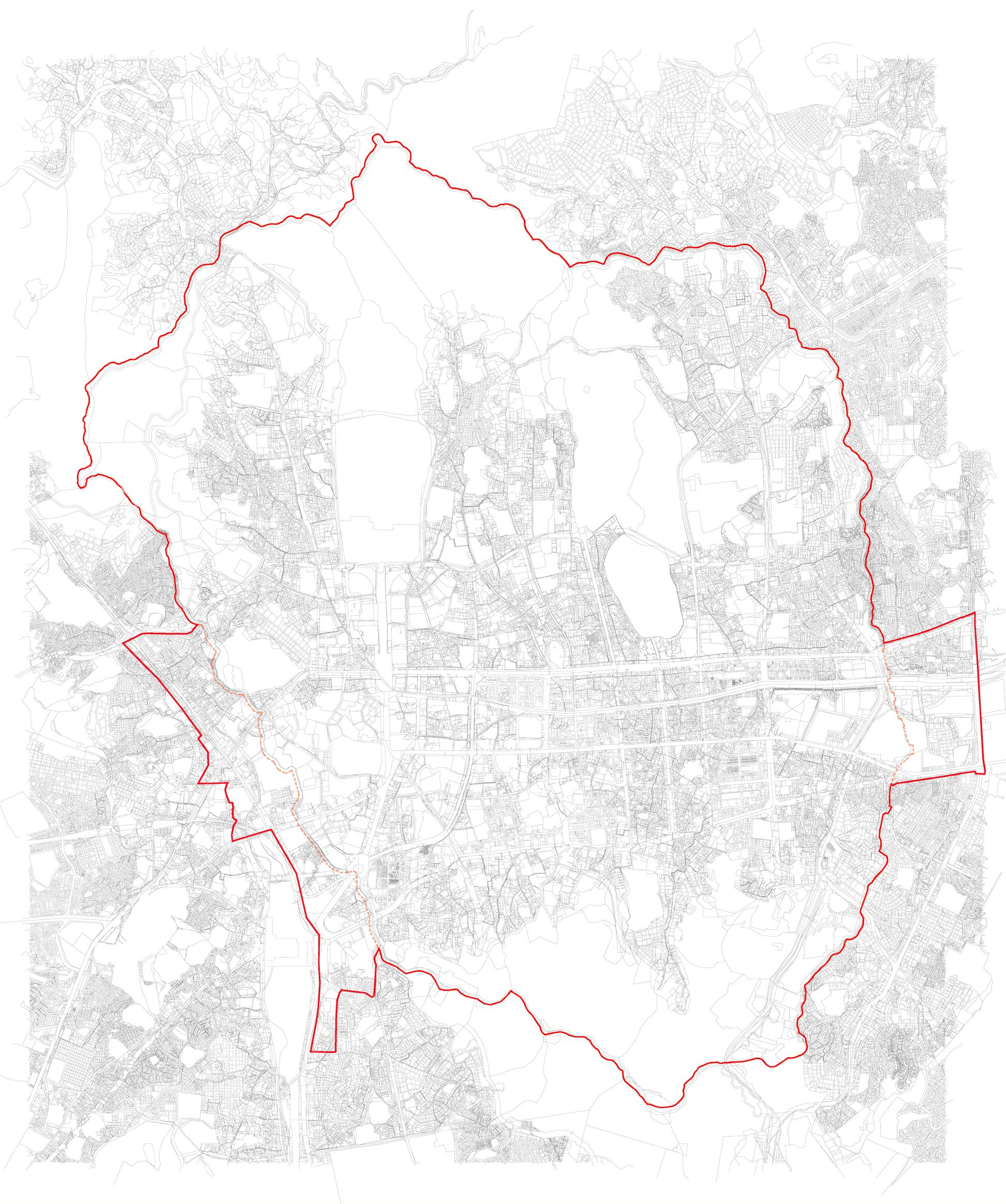
Figure 3. Administrative boundary of Downtown Seoul (Seoul Dosim, 서울 도심) from 2016

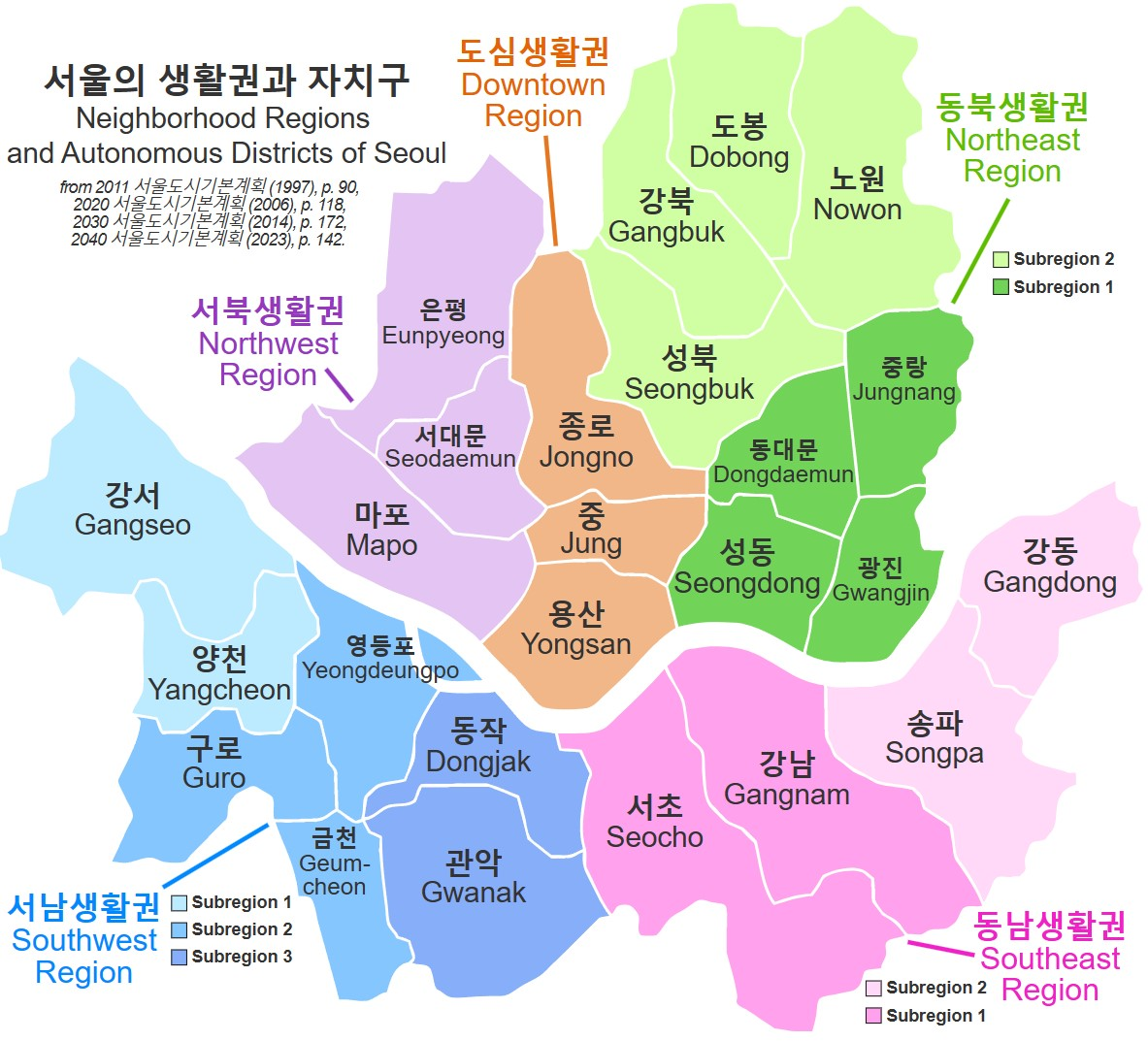
Seoul's autonomous districts are grouped into 5 regions under city's masterplan.

Like American term Lower Manhattan, as name of place, English term 'Downtown Seoul' and its matching Korean term Seoul Dosim (서울 도심; 서울 都心) have no solid boundary in public usage, since they are not a fixed administrative division, but variable terms under changing urban plans mainly referring to several areas including Gwanghwamun of Jongno District and Myeong-dong of Jung District. One of reasons comes from various denotation of Korean word dosim (도심; 都心) (or its English translation 'downtown'), because the word is sometimes regarded as having merely denotative meaning of 'inside city', compatible to another Korean word sinae (시내; 市內; lit. 'inside city'). However, despite occasional misuses, it is certain that both 'Downtown Seoul' and 서울 도심 have primary meaning of place name referring to areas inside the Seoul City Wall in a broad sense, or areas around the Seoul City Hall in limited sense, for both English speakers and Korean speakers.

Another major reason of the term's variability in social usage comes from a longtime lack of an official zoning plan that defines the exact boundary of Downtown Seoul until the 2000s. Early stages of modern urban planning in Downtown Seoul came not from a zoning plan specifically targeting the downtown area but rather as a part of citywide establishment of strict height restriction laws, starting in the 1960s. In this early stage, city planning in Downtown Seoul had two consistent, yet sometimes contradicting goals: regenerating low-density old towns into modernized high-density business districts, while limiting the eventual output of such redevelopment to suppress overurbanization. The scope of Downtown Seoul in 2000 was established in a relatively narrow sense under these agendas, usually referring to areas surrounded by six major roads: Sajik-ro and Yulgok-ro to the north, Toegye-ro to the south, Dasan-ro and Wangsan-ro to the east, and Tongil-ro to the west. Because this administrative boundary in 2000 (See Figure 2. on the right) did not exactly match with any boundaries of existing administrative dongs, it was difficult to calculate how many people were living in Downtown Seoul. So, the Seoul Metropolitan Government used the following nine administrative dongs as a proxy to estimate the approximate number of people living in Downtown Seoul between 2000 and 2015: Gyonam, Sajik, Jongno 1.2.3.4-ga and Jongno 5.6 ga-dong of Jongno District, plus Gwanghui, Myeong, Sogong, Euljiro 3.4.5-ga, and Hoehyeon-dong of Jung District.

However, above scope of Downtown Seoul's boundary was a lot narrow understanding than historic and cultural root of the whole downtown area inside the City Wall, originally called as Doseong-an in Joseon dynasty. From the 1990s, the Metropolitan Government started to recognize importance of preserving cultural landscape in traditional Seoul. These changing trend encouraged rediscovering function of the Seoul City Wall as cultural boundary between Doseong-an and Seongjeosimni, thus led to expanding administrative boundary under city masterplan in 2016 as following; Some part of Bugaksan to the North, some part of Namsan to the South (including the Seoul Station), Dasan-ro to the east, and Tongil-ro to the west. This renewed boundary in year 2016 (See Figure 3. on the right) intends to include almost every areas of Jongno and Jung District inside the City Wall under scope of development restriction. However, as this renewed area from year 2016 still did not match with any boundaries of existing administrative dongs, the Seoul Metropolitan Government still uses some of existing administrative dongs as proxy to estimate approximate number of population living in Downtown Seoul. Additional 6 administrative dongs (Cheongunhyoja, Ihwa, Gahoe and Samcheong-dong of Jongno District, plus Jangchung and Pil-dong of Jung District) are added to 9 proxy dongs in year 2000, making a total of 15 dongs as renewed proxy as following; Gyonam, Sajik, Jongno 1.2.3.4-ga, Jongno 5.6-ga, Cheongunhyoja, Ihwa, Gahoe and Samcheong-dong of Jongno District (8 dongs), plus Gwanghui, Myeong, Sogong, Euljiro 3.4.5-ga, Hoehyeon, Jangchung and Pil-dong of Jung District (7 dongs).

Further notable point is usage of term 'Downtown Region' (도심권; 都心圈; Dosimgwon) in present day Seoul's urban planning. Like relationship between terms of capital city and capital region, the term 'Downtown Region' in Seoul means areas surrounding Downtown Seoul, usually referring to three autonomous districts in central part of the Seoul; Jongno District, Jung District and Yongsan District.

== Politics and protests ==
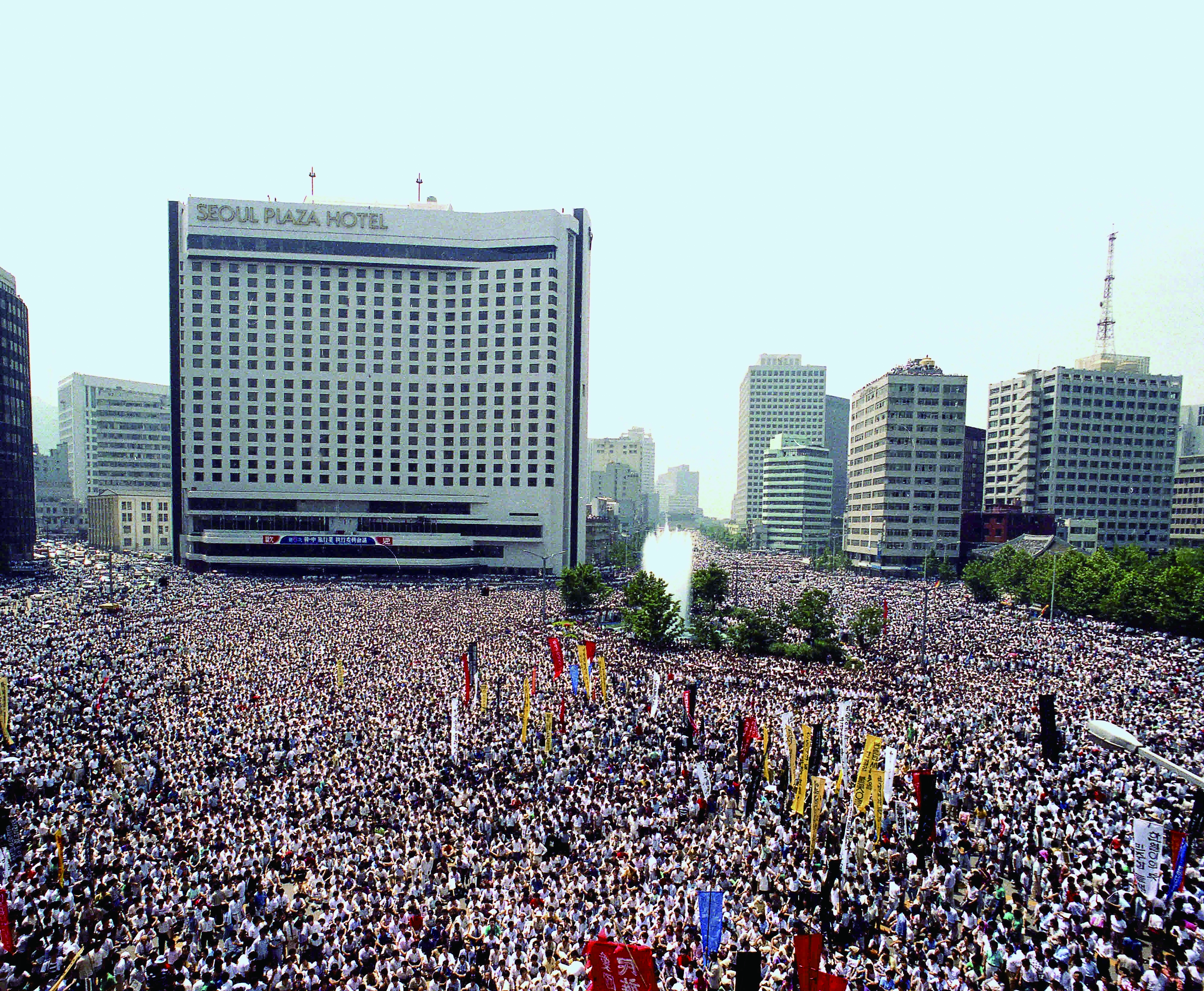
In the 1987 June Struggle, millions of people gathered around Seoul Plaza for a memorial of Lee Han-yeol, who died fighting for South Korea's democratization from the Fifth Republic.

Before relocating some of executive ministries to the Sejong in the 2010s, Downtown Seoul was center of the old Seoul with full of powerful government executives, such as Government Complex Seoul, Board of Audit and Inspection, and the Blue House. Also, other branches of the national government were all located in Downtown Seoul. For example, the Supreme Court of Korea was located in Seosomun-dong of Jung District until the 1990s, and the Constitutional Court of Korea is still seated in Anguk-dong of Jongno District. Even the National Assembly was seated in Seosomun-dong of Jung District before the Korea National Assembly Proceeding Hall was built in the 1970s. This concentration of political power in Downtown Seoul until 1990s led most of prominent media and law firms to settle in it.

Meanwhile, Downtown Seoul's major component Jongno District has tremendous symbolic influence over entire South Korean politics as constituency for South Korean general election. Mostly well-known nickname for this little constituency is 'Number One Politics' or 'Nation's No. 1 political avenue' (정치 1번지), since it is a famous swing state in South Korea. By its unpredictable potential power of swing voters, Jongno as constituency raised numerous political big shots who won elections from close match. Former president Roh Moo-hyun and Lee Myung-bak are renowned examples who grew their career in Jongno as magnate politician.

Downtown Seoul's incomparable status as historic and political center of the Seoul, can also be found by most of symbolic protests happened in contemporary history of South Korea. June Democratic Struggle in 1987, protest against import of US beef in 2008, and protests around impeachment of Park Geun-hye in 2017 are some of leading example for such protests. Seoul Plaza and Gwanghwamun Plaza in Downtown Seoul are famous place where those historically important protests were held. Though the South Korean presidential palace has been moved from the Blue House of Jongno District to Presidential Office of Yongsan District in 2023, Downtown Seoul is still an unmatched symbolic place where most of significant social protests in South Korea happens.

== Economy and industry ==
The Downtown Seoul area (Seoul CBD) rules topmost position among Seoul's major business districts, compared to the Gangnam (GBD) and the Yeouido (YBD), and is traditional heart of the South Korean economy. Among these three major business districts in Seoul, the downtown area shows most diversified industry composition, while having relatively strong position in finance, legal, and media industry.

In year 2021, the Downtown Seoul area's two major administrative component, Jung District and Jongno District's regional GDP hit 61.36 trillion won and 35.72 trillion won, respectively, ranking second and fifth among Seoul city's 25 autonomous districts. Also, these two districts have regional GDP per capita as 480 million won and 230 million won respectively, which is the first and second highest in Seoul. This high concentration of economic power is driving up average income of workers in the downtown area. According to Statistics Korea, as of April 2023, average income of workers in Jongno District (4.26 million won) ranked first in all around South Korea, followed by Yeongdeungpo (4.15 million won), Jung (4.04 million won), Seocho (3.92 million won) and Gangnam (3.90 million won).

=== Finance ===
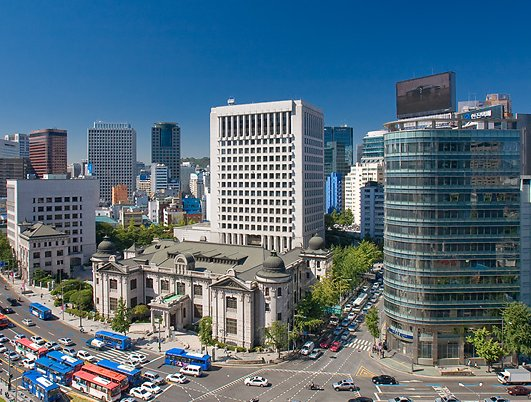
The Bank of Korea is seated in Sogong-dong of Jung District, composing financial district of Downtown Seoul.

In early contemporary history of South Korea, Downtown Seoul was a sole financial district in entire nation, since most of modern financial institutions introduced in late Joseon were established inside it. For example, the Bank of Korea, which is the central bank of South Korea following the Bank of Chōsen in Colonial Korea, is established at Sogong-dong near Myeong-dong and still operates in same place. Also, the Korean Stock Exchange was originally established at Myeong-dong in 1956, which was following former 'Gyeongseong Stock Market' opened at same place during Colonial Korea. For its unmatched symbolic status, Myeong-dong was still the most prominent financial district in South Korea until the early 1990s, even after the national government relocated Korean Stock Exchange to Yeouido in 1979.

Although many of South Korean stock brokerage firms moved to Yeouido after the late 1990s, Downtown Seoul still operates as important financial district, as most of banking, insurance and credit card firms are left inside it. In 2022 survey of The Seoul Institute, 40 out of 55 banks, 29 out of 54 insurance companies, and 7 out of 8 credit card issuers among entire nation have its headquarters in Downtown Seoul. Also, most of foreign financial firms are located around Gwanghwamun. This continued agglomeration of financial industry inside Downtown Seoul stems from its unparalleled centrality across almost every fields. For instance, while Yeouido is a specialized business district mostly dedicated to financial industry, Downtown Seoul is concentrated with various largest companies, governmental regulators (such as the Financial Services Commission and the Korea Deposit Insurance Corporation), and foreign embassies influenced by Ministry of Foreign Affairs in Government Complex Seoul.

=== Legal ===
South Korea's top 4 biggest law firms - Kim & Chang (김·장 법률사무소), Lee & Ko (법무법인 광장), Bae, Kim & Lee (법무법인 태평양) and Shin & Kim (법무법인 세종) - all are located in Downtown Seoul currently in the 2020s, and it is where all these big 4 started each of their history.

South Korean legal industry's history of agglomeration towards Big Law started in the 1970s, with establishment of the Kim & Chang in 1973, followed by Lee & Ko (1977), Bae, Kim & Lee (1980), and Shin & Kim (1983). During these early days from the 1970s to 1980s, the Supreme Court and the Seoul's central trial court (present Seoul Central District Court, 서울중앙지방법원) were both seated in Downtown Seoul. Also, the Constitutional Court is still seated in Downtown Seoul since its establishment in 1988. This concentration of highest courts and biggest law firms in Downtown Seoul stopped for a moment, when the Supreme Court and central trial court moved to Seocho District in 1995. For example, Bae, Kim & Lee moved from Seosomun-dong of Jung District to Yeoksam-dong in 1998.

Yet as South Korean legal industry began advancing towards more lucrative business area such as government relations for chaebols and multinational companies, distance to local trial court became less important for Big Laws. Rather, proximity of large native business groups and foreign companies become much important, which was only available in Downtown Seoul. So while South Korean law firms having relative competency in ordinary day-to-day litigations are headquartered in Gangnam region near Seoul Central District Court, other firms pursuing market portion in corporate legal advice and government relations are headquartered back in Downtown Seoul. For example, one of Big 4, Bae, Kim & Lee chose turning back to Gongpyeong-dong of Jung District in 2020.

=== Media ===
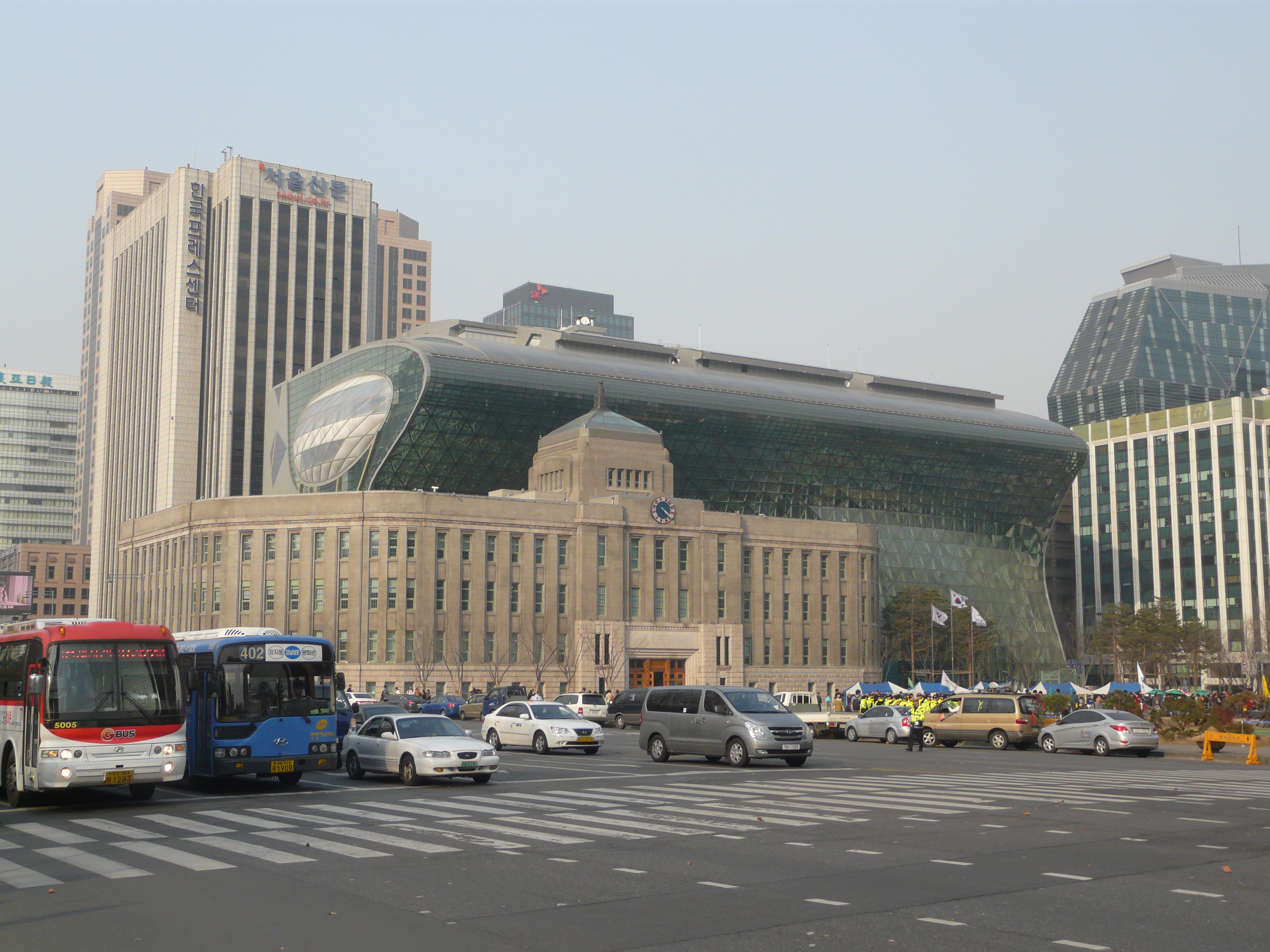
Ivory colored high-rise building in the left side of photo, the 'Press Center' (한국프레스센터) is symbol of South Korean journalists and news agencies.

One of the industries that characterize Downtown Seoul is mass media, symbolized by largest newspaper companies like The Chosun Ilbo and The Dong-A Ilbo standing along Sejong-daero, or the only national news agency, Yonhap News Agency, standing near Gwanghwamun. In 2020 survey of Journalists Association of Korea, 18 out of 27 South Korean mass media companies having history longer than 30 years, were located in Jongno District and Jung District.

Downtown Seoul naturally became national core area of newspapers and news agencies as it was sole city-centre of Seoul until the late 1970s. Its central status as capital of newspapers and news agencies, is symbolized in modern high-rise building, 'Press Center' (프레스센터). This building, standing along the Sejong-daero behind the Seoul City Hall, is constructed in 1985 and still serves as hub for journalists and reporters in South Korea, also including the Seoul Foreign Correspondents' Club.

Yet it is notifiable that South Korean broadcasting companies almost never headquartered inside Downtown Seoul. While newspapers with long history beginning from Colonial era started their business from Downtown Seoul, younger media companies were not able to enter the downtown area due to high rent price. This pricey huddle led broadcasting companies later established in the 1980s to settle in Yeouido, which was business district newly developed in the 1970s. However, when national government promoted redevelopment of Mapo District into Digital Media City (DMC), many broadcasting companies moved from Yeouido to DMC. Also, one of Big 3 newspaper company JoongAng Ilbo, chose moving to DMC in 2020, to accelerate growth of its broadcasting company, JTBC.

== Transportation ==
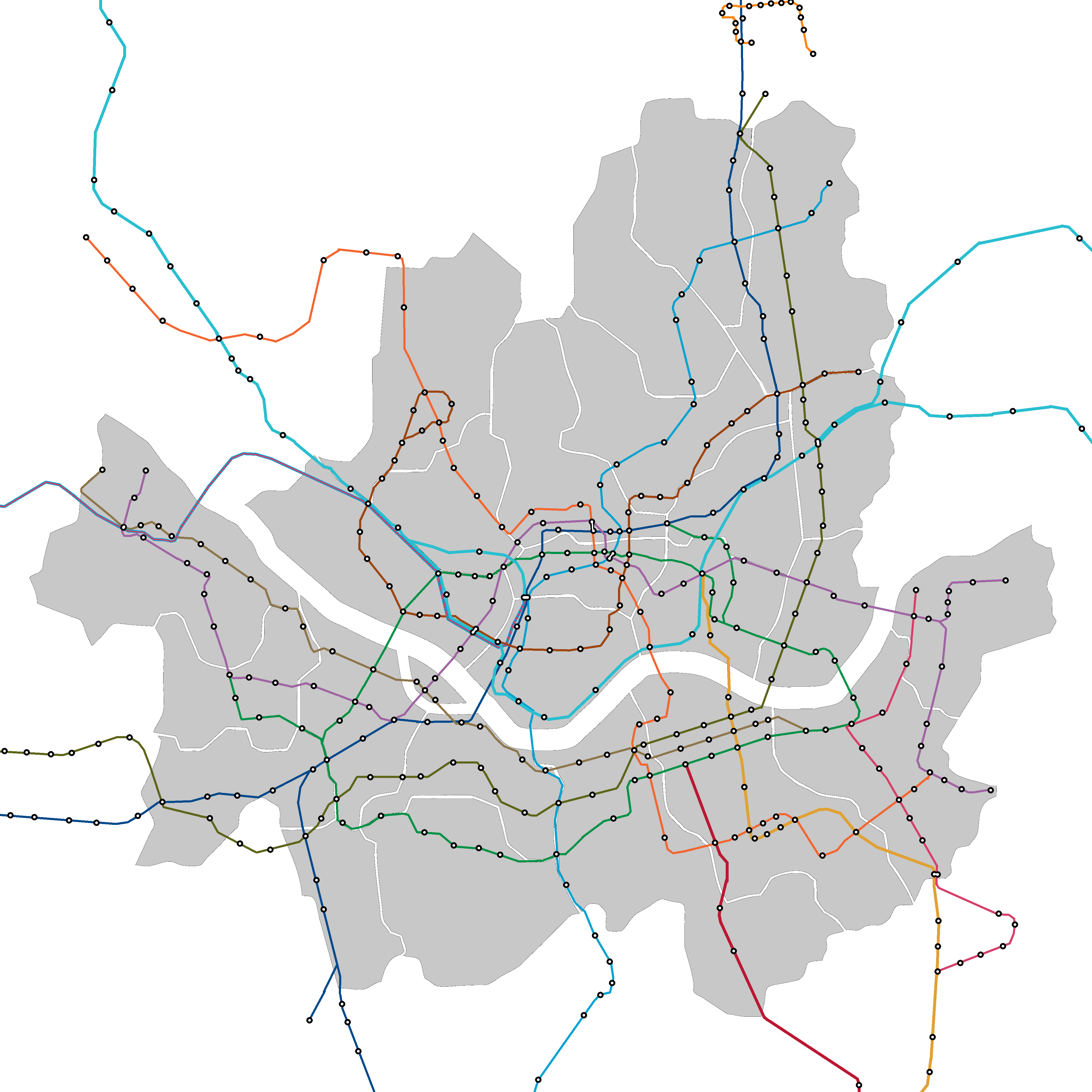
Seoul's subway stations are found densely concentrated inside Jongno and Jung District, which are the main components of Downtown Seoul (old version map)

Downtown Seoul suffers most heavy traffic in Seoul. Back in 1970, when Downtown Seoul was only business district in Seoul, its measured average road speed was only 12 kilometers per hour. To mitigate this high traffic congestion in downtown area, Seoul Metropolitan Government continuously put efforts on public transportation. For example, most of Seoul's subway lines crossing downtown area are built in this time around the 1970s and 1980s, which today show dense concentration of subway stations along Sejong-daero, Jong-ro, and Euljiro, including famous stations such as Gwanghwamun, City Hall, Jongno 3-ga, and Euljiro 3-ga station. Also through the same time, Seoul Metropolitan Government eliminated out trams and expanded bus transportations.

However, though those efforts have succeeded at mitigating traffic congestions in the downtown, it is still suffering the heaviest traffic congestion in Seoul. In 2023 report from Seoul Metropolitan Government, Ujeongguk-ro and Jong-ro, which are both located in Jongno District, ranked top 2 among the most congested major roads in Seoul, hitting average weekday speed to 17.5 and 18.0 kilometers per hour respectively. Namdaemun-ro, a road connected to south end of the Ujeongguk-ro, is another symbolic place for traffic congestion in Downtown Seoul. Since this road is where commuters working near Myeong-dong takes bus, it usually shows surge of crowds when commuters come and go.

== Notable places ==
=== Government buildings ===
- Blue House
- Seoul City Hall
- Constitutional Court of Korea
- Board of Audit and Inspection
- Government Complex Seoul
  - Ministry of Foreign Affairs
  - Financial Services Commission
  - Personal Information Protection Commission
- Nuclear Safety and Security Commission
- National Human Rights Commission of Korea
- Bank of Korea
- Korea Deposit Insurance Corporation

=== Cultural heritages and public museums ===
- Jongmyo Shrine
- Changdeokgung
- Gyeongbokgung
  - Gwanghwamun
  - National Palace Museum of Korea
  - National Folk Museum of Korea
- Changgyeonggung
- Deoksugung
- Gyeonghuigung
- Sajikdan
- Fortress Wall of Seoul
  - Namdaemun
  - Dongdaemun
- Bosingak
- National Museum of Modern and Contemporary Art
- National Museum of Korean Contemporary History
- Seoul Museum of Art
- Seoul Museum of History
- Bank of Korea Money Museum
- Seoul City Wall Museum
- Seoul Education Museum

=== Private galleries and museums ===
- Art Sonje Center
- Art Center Nabi
- Bukchon Art Museum
- Gahoe Museum
- Gyeonggyojang
- Ilmin Museum of Art
- Kumho Museum of Art
- Presseum
- The Museum of Agriculture

=== Streets and regions ===
- Jongno
- Sejongno
- Daehangno
- Jeong-dong
- Insa-dong
- Samcheong-dong
- Myeong-dong
- Sogong-dong

=== Other tourist attractions ===
- Bukchon Hanok Village
- Cheonggyecheon
- Dongdaemun Design Plaza
- Dongdaemun Market
- Gwanghwamun Plaza
- Inwangsan
- Jangchungdan Park
- Jogyesa
- Jongno Tower
- Marronnier Park
- Myeongdong Cathedral
- Naksan
- Namsan
  - N Seoul Tower
- National Theater of Korea
- Sejong Center
- Seoul Plaza
- Seoul Station

== See also ==
- Seoul
- History of Seoul
- Jongno District
- Jung District, Seoul
- Economy of Seoul
