= Economy of Seoul =

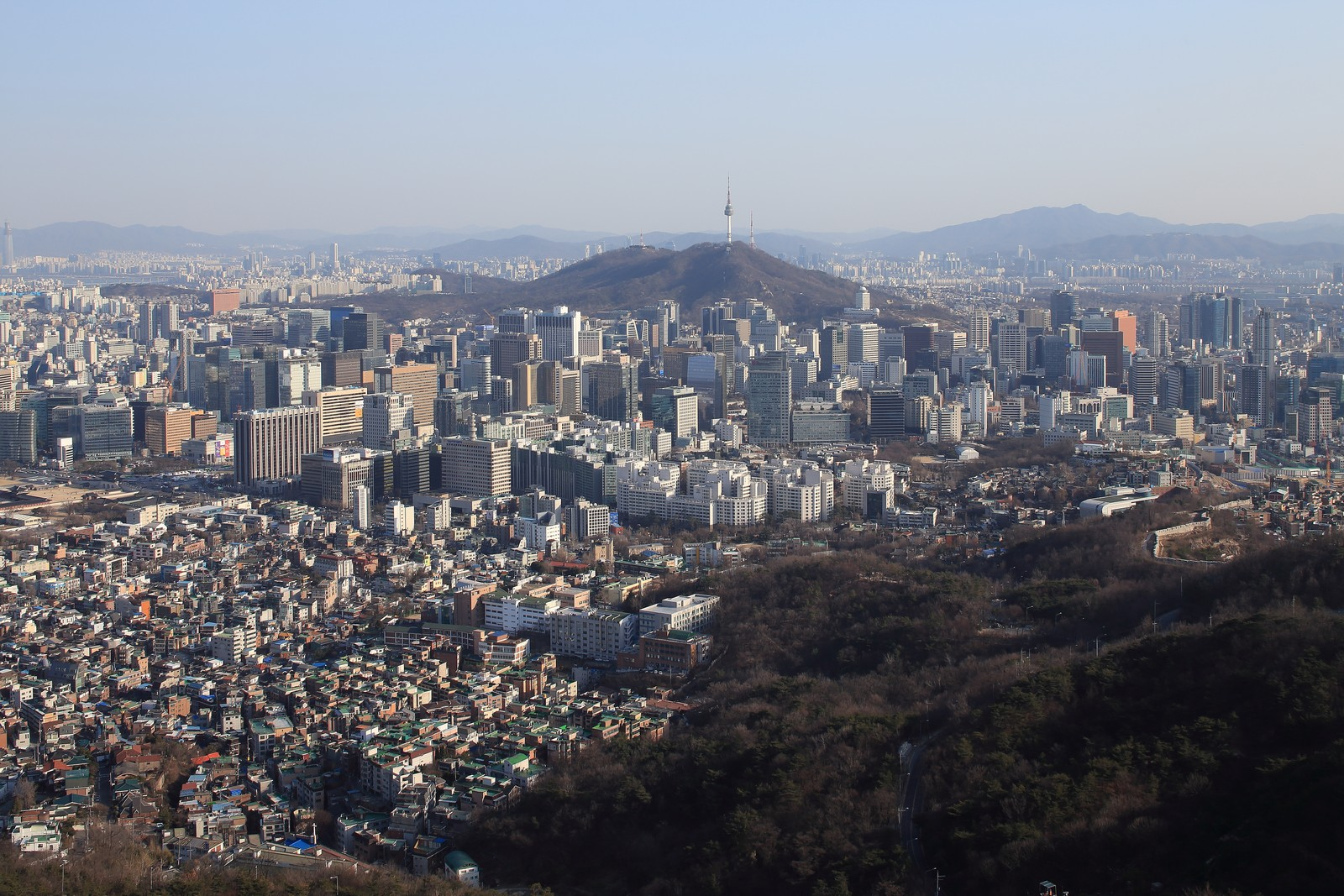
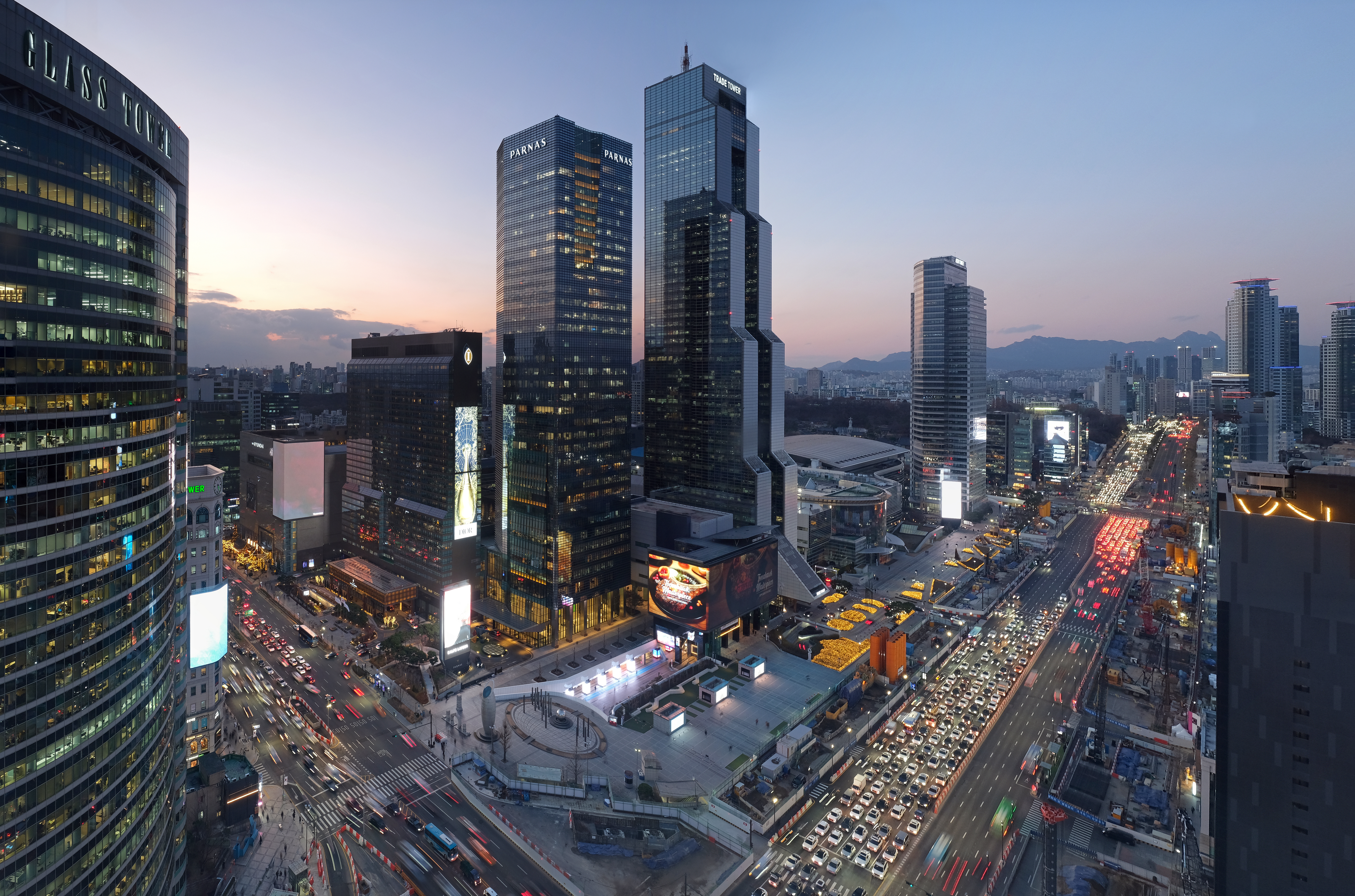
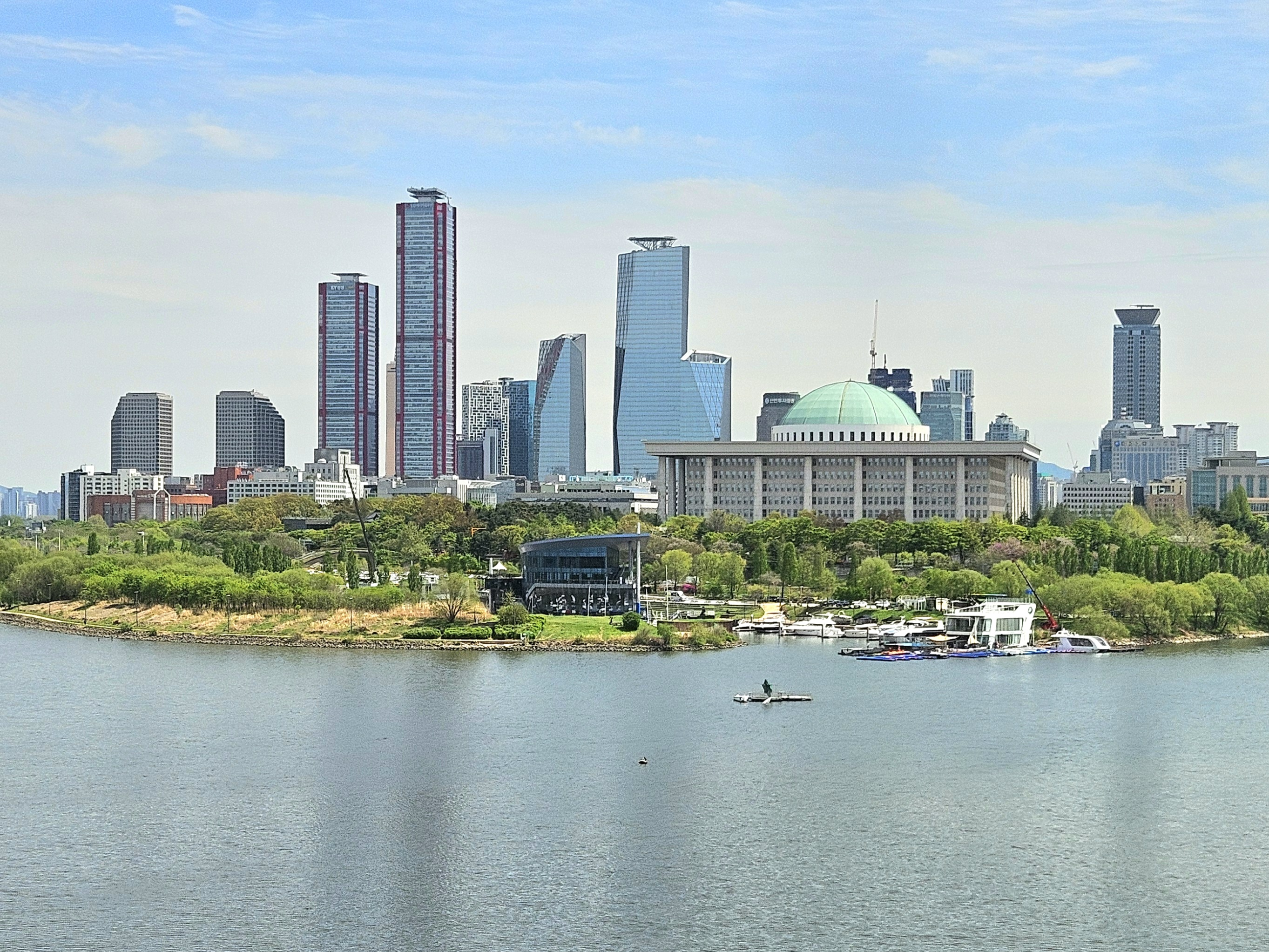
- Downtown Gangnam Yeouido Outlook of three major business districts in Seoul

Statistics
- Population: 9,501,528 (2021)
- GDP: ₩486 trillion (nominal; 2021)
- GDP rank: 2nd (nominal; 2022)
- GDP growth: 3.4% (2021)
- GDP per capita: US$43,404 (nominal; 2021)
- GDP per capita rank: 3rd (nominal; 2021)
- Average gross salary: ₩26.61 million (nominal; 2022)

Public finance
- Budget balance: ₩4.4 trillion (operating; 2019)
- Revenue: ₩30.6 trillion (operating; 2019)
- Spending: ₩26.1 trillion (operating; 2019)
- Credit rating: AA by S&P (2019)
- All values, unless otherwise stated, are in US dollars.

Seoul, the capital of South Korea, is home to giant business groups such as Hyundai, SK, LG, Hanhwa, GS, KB, CJ and Samsung, ranking fifth in global city GDP and second in Asian city GDP. The service sector accounts for the largest portion of the city's labor force. As the center of the country's finance, Seoul is concentrated in Yeouido, where the headquarters of major stock exchanges and banks are located. The city holds many annual trade fairs.

According to the Union of International Associations, Seoul is the city that hosts the most international conferences in Asia. Seoul's global financial competitiveness ranked 10th out of 130 cities.

== Manufacturing ==
The traditional, labor-intensive manufacturing industries have been continuously replaced by information technology, electronics and assembly-type of industries; however, food and beverage production, as well as printing and publishing remained among the core industries. Major manufacturers are headquartered in the city, including Samsung, LG, Hyundai, Kia and SK. Notable food and beverage companies include Jinro, whose soju is the most sold alcoholic drink in the world, beating out Smirnoff vodka; top selling beer producers Hite (merged with Jinro) and Oriental Brewery. It also hosts food giants like Seoul Dairy Cooperative, Nongshim Group, Ottogi, CJ, Orion, Maeil Holdings, Namyang Dairy Products and Lotte.

== Business ==
Seoul has three central business districts; the Downtown Seoul(CBD), Gangnam(GBD), and Yeouido(YBD). The Downtown Seoul, which has 600 hundred years of history as unparalleled business district in entire Korea, is now a densely concentrated area around Gwanghwamun and Cheonggyecheon with headquarters of major companies, foreign financial institutions, largest news agencies and law firms. Other two business districts are developed in 1970s and have different characteristic; while Gangnam is well known for tech, luxury and private education industries, Yeouido is famous for securities exchange and asset management.

As significant portion of South Korean economy is propelled by manufacturing and tech firms, office market in Seoul is not driven by FIRE companies. Rather, diverse industries creates demand for office in central business districts in Seoul. This characteristic is most clearly evident in Downtown Seoul, where most of foreign companies headquarters South Korean branch office regardless of their industry. Meanwhile, Gangnam office market is also sustained by diverse industries, yet most of its components come from tech and luxury retails. The most homogeneous composition is found in Yeouido, where most of financial institutions, especially most of native stock brokerage firms reside in.

== Finance ==
According to the Global Financial Centerss Index report released in 2024, Seoul ranked 10th. The city ranked 13th in business environment and financial sector development, seventh in human capital, 10th in infrastructure and 12th in reputation. In 2023, the city announced plans to invest $44.7 million over six years to create a dedicated area to attract foreign investment.

Seoul's nowadays competency in financial industry is mainly found in Yeouido, which is often named as Wall Street of South Korea. Although history of Yeouido got started in 1979 when the national government relocated Korea Stock Exchange out from Downtown Seoul, its distinct fame as financial district of the whole nation started later in 1990s, when South Korea started deregulating stock market to attract foreign investments.

Yet it is notifiable that major functions as financial district are still distributed among big three business districts, as Yeouido leads, Downtown Seoul follows, and Gangnam is in the last. In 2022 survey of the Seoul Institute, about 40% of entire financial institutions were settled in Yeouido. However, its composition was heavily concentrated to native firms on stock brokerage and asset management. Other sectors, such as banking, insurance and credit cards, were found mostly concentrated in Downtown Seoul. Also, most of foreign stock brokerage firms settled in Downtown Seoul. Meanwhile, Gangnam had its distinct competency in fintech start-ups and real estate firms.

== Retail ==
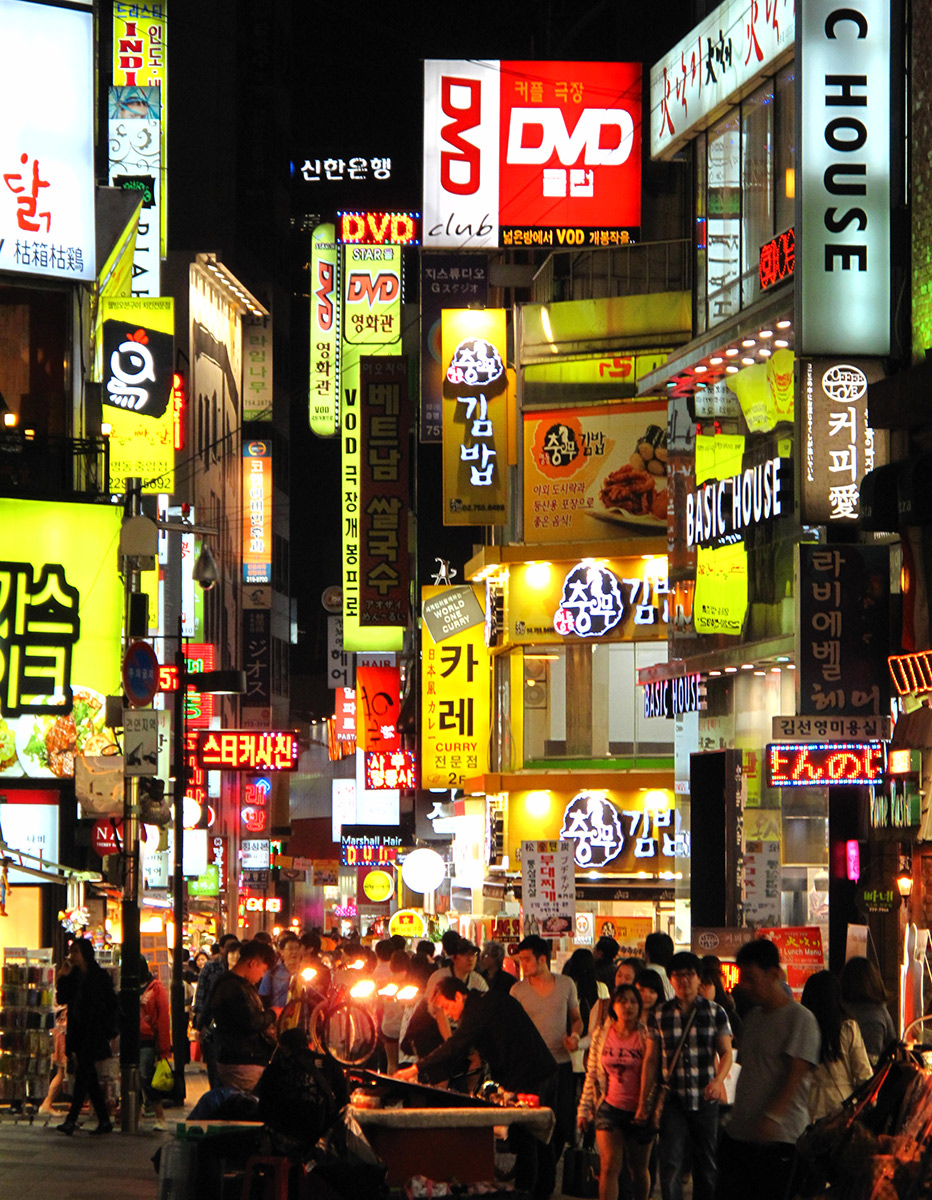
Myeong-dong is one of the most popular destinations in Seoul.

The largest wholesale and retail market in South Korea, the Dongdaemun Market, is located in Seoul. Myeongdong is a shopping and entertainment area in downtown Seoul with mid- to high-end stores, fashion boutiques and international brand outlets. The nearby Namdaemun Market, named after the Namdaemun Gate, is the oldest continually running market in Seoul.

Insadong is the cultural art market of Seoul, where traditional and modern Korean artworks, such as paintings, sculptures and calligraphy are sold. Hwanghak-dong Flea Market and Janganpyeong Antique Market also offer antique products. Some shops for local designers have opened in Samcheong-dong, where numerous small art galleries are located. While Itaewon had catered mainly to foreign tourists and American soldiers based in the city, Koreans now comprise the majority of visitors to the area. The Gangnam district is one of the most affluent areas in Seoul and is noted for the fashionable and upscale Apgujeong-dong and Cheongdam-dong areas and the COEX Mall. Wholesale markets include Noryangjin Fisheries Wholesale Market and Garak Market.

The Yongsan Electronics Market is the largest electronics market in Asia. Electronics markets are Gangbyeon station metro line 2 Techno mart, ENTER6 MALL & Shindorim station Technomart mall complex. Times Square is one of Seoul's largest shopping malls, and contains the world's largest permanent 35 mm cinema screen, the CGV Starium.

Korea World Trade Center Complex, which comprises COEX mall, congress center, 3 Inter-continental hotels, Business tower (Asem tower), Residence hotel, Casino and City airport terminal was established in 1988 in time for the Seoul Olympics. The 2nd World trade trade center is being planned at Seoul Olympic stadium complex as MICE HUB by Seoul city. Ex-Kepco head office building was purchased by Hyundai motor group with 9billion USD to build 115-storey Hyundai GBC & hotel complex until 2021. Now ex-kepco 25-storey building is under demolition.

== Technology ==
Seoul has been described as the world's "most wired city", ranked first in technology readiness by PwC's Cities of Opportunity report. Seoul has a very technologically advanced infrastructure.

Seoul is among the world leaders in Internet connectivity, being the capital of South Korea, which has the world's highest fiber-optic broadband penetration and highest global average internet speeds of 26.1 Mbit/s. Since 2015, Seoul has provided free Wi-Fi access in outdoor spaces through a 47.7 billion won ($44 million) project with Internet access at 10,430 parks, streets and other public places. Internet speeds in some apartment buildings reach up to 52.5 Gbit/s with assistance from Nokia, and though the average standard consists of 100 Mbit/s services, providers nationwide are rapidly rolling out 1Gbit/s connections at the equivalent of US$20 per month. In addition, the city is served by the KTX high-speed rail and the Seoul Subway, which provides 4G LTE, Wi-Fi, and DMB inside subway cars. In Seoul, 5G will be introduced commercially in March 2019.

== GDP ==
As of 2023, Seoul's GDP is $779.3 billion.

=== GRDP ===
Year	Nominal GRDP (₩TN)
2005	232.18
2006	245.6
2007	266.6
2008	282.07
2009	293.69
2010	313.28
2011	326.42
2012	340.71
2013	340.71
2014	350.26
2015	370.17
2016	387.36
2017	404.08
2018	423.74
2019	435.93
2020	444.55
2021	472.04
2022	485.75

(See List of cities by GDP for more figures.)

== Top publicly traded companies in Seoul ==
In 2023, 11 out of 18 Fortune Global 500 companies based in South Korea, headquartered in Seoul.

Top Eleven Fortune Global 500 companies headquartered in Seoul (2023)
Local rank	FG 500 rank	Company name	Industry	Location
1	85	Hyundai Motor Company	Motor vehicles	Yangjae-dong, Seocho District
2	92	SK Group	Electronics, etc	Jongno, Jongno District
3	196	Kia	Motor vehicles	Heolleung-ro, Seocho District
4	204	LG Electronics	Electronics	Yeoui-dong, Yeongdeungpo District
5	296	Hanwha Group	Aerospace, etc	Myeong-dong, Jung District
6	322	GS Caltex	Energy and Chemical	Yeoksam-dong, Gangnam District
7	339	KB Financial Group	Finance	Yeoui-dong, Yeongdeungpo District
8	371	LG Chem	Chemical	Yeoui-dong, Yeongdeungpo District
9	390	Hyundai Mobis	Motor parts	Yeoksam-dong, Gangnam
10	481	CJ Group	Food, Media, etc	Namdaemunno, Jung District
11	496	Samsung Life Insurance	Insurance	Seocho-dong, Seocho District
Note: Samsung C&T has its headquarters divided by departments: Some of them are based in Seoul, while the other is based in the city of Yongin. So this company is not included in the table.

== See also ==
- Downtown Seoul
- Economy of South Korea
- Manufacturing in South Korea
