= Cho-dong =

Neighborhood in Seoul, South Korea

Coordinates: 37.564°N 126.992°E

- Alleyway connecting Mareunnae-ro 2 gil
- Interactive map of Cho-dong
- Country: South Korea

Area
  - Total: 0.05 km^{2} (0.019 sq mi)

Korean name
- Hangul: 초동
- Hanja: 草洞
- RR: Cho-dong
- MR: Ch'o-dong

Cho-dong (Korean: 초동) is a legal dong (neighborhood) of Jung District, Seoul, South Korea. It is governed by its administrative dong, Euljiro 3, 4, 5-dong.

== See also ==
- Administrative divisions of South Korea
