= Haengchon-dong =

- Country: South Korea

Korean name
- Hangul: 행촌동
- Hanja: 杏村洞
- RR: Haengchon-dong
- MR: Haengch'on-dong

Haengchon-dong (Korean: 행촌동) is a dong (neighborhood) of Jongno District, Seoul, South Korea. It is a legal dong (법정동 法定洞) administered under its administrative dong (행정동 行政洞), Gyonam-dong.

== See also ==
- Administrative divisions of South Korea
