= Songwol-dong =

Songwol-dong may refer to one of the dong of cities in South Korea:

- Songwol-dong, Seoul, Jongno-gu, Seoul
- Songwol-dong, Incheon, Jung District, Incheon
