= Hongpa-dong =

- Interactive map of Hongpa-dong
- Country: South Korea

Area
  - Total: 0.04 km^{2} (0.015 sq mi)

Korean name
- Hangul: 홍파동
- Hanja: 紅把洞
- RR: Hongpa-dong
- MR: Hongp'a-dong

Hongpa-dong (Korean: 홍파동) is a dong (neighborhood) of Jongno District, Seoul, South Korea. It is a legal dong (법정동 法定洞) administered under its administrative dong (행정동 行政洞), Gyonam-dong.

== See also ==
- Administrative divisions of South Korea
