= Palpan-dong =

- Interactive map of Palpan-dong
- Country: South Korea

Area
  - Total: 0.04 km^{2} (0.015 sq mi)

Korean name
- Hangul: 팔판동
- Hanja: 八判洞
- RR: Palpan-dong
- MR: P'alp'an-dong

Palpan-dong (Korean: 팔판동) is a dong (neighbourhood) of Jongno District, Seoul, South Korea. It is a legal dong (법정동 法定洞) administered under its administrative dong (행정동 行政洞), Samcheong-dong.

== See also ==
- Administrative divisions of South Korea
