= Gyobuk-dong =

- Interactive map of Gyobuk-dong
- Country: South Korea

Area
  - Total: 0.03 km^{2} (0.012 sq mi)

Korean name
- Hangul: 교북동
- Hanja: 橋北洞
- RR: Gyobuk-dong
- MR: Kyobuk-tong

Gyobuk-dong (Korean: 교북동) is a dong (neighborhood) of Jongno District, Seoul, South Korea. It is a legal dong (법정동 法定洞) administered under its administrative dong (행정동 行政洞), Gyonam-dong.

== See also ==
- Administrative divisions of South Korea
