= Namyang =

- Namyang clan, of the Hong family of Korea
- Namyang Workers' District, North Korea
- Namyang Dairy Products, a company based in Seoul
- Hwaseong, Gyeonggi, South Korea, formerly named Namyang (남양 / 南陽)
