= Songwol-dong, Seoul =

Coordinates: 37.5700°N 126.9652°E

Songwol-dong
- Interactive map of Songwol-dong
- Country: South Korea

Area
  - Total: 0.04 km^{2} (0.015 sq mi)

Korean name
- Hangul: 송월동
- Hanja: 松月洞
- RR: Songwol-dong
- MR: Songwŏl-tong

Songwol-dong (Korean: 송월동) is a dong (neighbourhood) of Jongno District, Seoul, South Korea. It is a legal dong (법정동 法定洞) administered under its administrative dong (행정동 行政洞), Gyonam-dong.

== See also ==
- Administrative divisions of South Korea
