= Seosomun-dong =

Neighbourhood in Seoul, South Korea

- Country: South Korea

Korean name
- Hangul: 서소문동
- Hanja: 西小門洞
- RR: Seosomun-dong
- MR: Sŏsomun-dong

Seosomun-dong (Korean: 서소문동) is a legal dong (neighbourhood) of Jung District, Seoul, South Korea. It is administered by its administrative dong, Sogong-dong.

Air China has an office on the 1st and 2nd floors of the Hansuang Building in Seosomun-dong.

== See also ==
- Administrative divisions of South Korea
- Seosomun Presbyterian Church
