= Seoul Metropolitan Government =

Local government of Seoul, South Korea

Seoul Metropolitan Government 서울특별시청
- Emblem

Type
- Type: Local government
- Term limits: 4 years

History
- Founded: 15 August 1949; 76 years ago

Leadership
- Mayor: Oh Se-hoon
- Deputy Mayors: Kim Sang-han (First Administrative Deputy Mayor); Yoo Chang-soo (Second Administrative Deputy Mayor); Kang Cheol-won (Deputy Mayor for Political Affairs)

Meeting place
- City Hall, Jung District, Seoul

Website
- www.seoul.go.kr (in Korean) english.seoul.go.kr (in English)

- Seoul Metropolitan Government
- Hangul: 서울특별시청
- Hanja: 서울特別市廳
- RR: Seoul-teukbyeolsicheong
- MR: Sŏul-t'ŭkpyŏlsich'ŏng

The Seoul Metropolitan Government (Korean: 서울특별시청) is a local government of Seoul, South Korea. The mayor is elected to a four-year term by the citizens of Seoul and is responsible for the administration of the city government. The Seoul Metropolitan Government deals with administrative affairs as the capital city of South Korea. Hence, it is more centralized than that of most other cities, with the city government being responsible for correctional institutions, public education, libraries, public safety, recreational facilities, sanitation, water supply, and welfare services.

In the city government, there are 5 offices, 32 bureaus, and 107 divisions. The headquarters is located in the Seoul City Hall building which is in Taepyeongno, Jung-gu, Seoul. The Government started on September 28, 1946 as the Seoul City Government which became Seoul Metropolitan Government on August 15, 1949. The Seoul Metropolitan Government has one mayor and three vice mayors, with one in charge of political affairs and the other two in charge of administrative affairs. Seoul is subdivided into 25 autonomous gu and 522 administrative dong.

The Seoul Institute (SI), the think tank for the city, was established in 1992 by the Seoul Metropolitan Government. It was formerly known as The Seoul Development Institute (SDI). The SI supports the policy-making processes of the municipal administration by conducting intensive research and cooperating with domestic and foreign research institutes. The SI seeks to collaborate and communicate with the citizens of Seoul "to secure the validity of its various policy researches".

Seoul participates in the anti-climate change C40 Cities organisation.

== See also ==
- Politics of South Korea
- Seoul City Hall
- The Seoul Institute
