= List of South Korean regions by GDP =

This is a list of South Korean regions by GDP (nominal). All data are sourced from the latest regional statistics published by the South Korean Government.

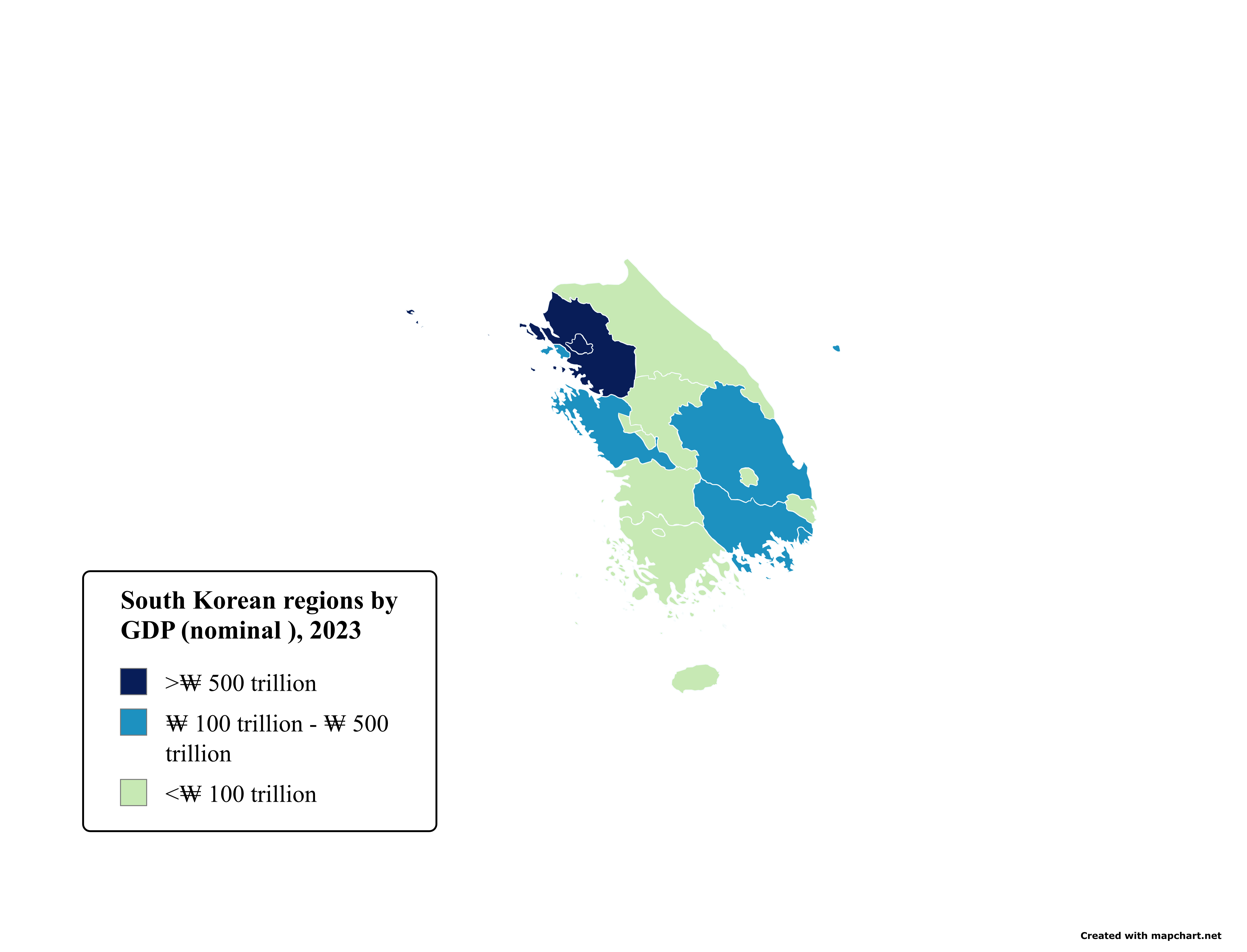
South Korean regions by GDP (nominal), 2023

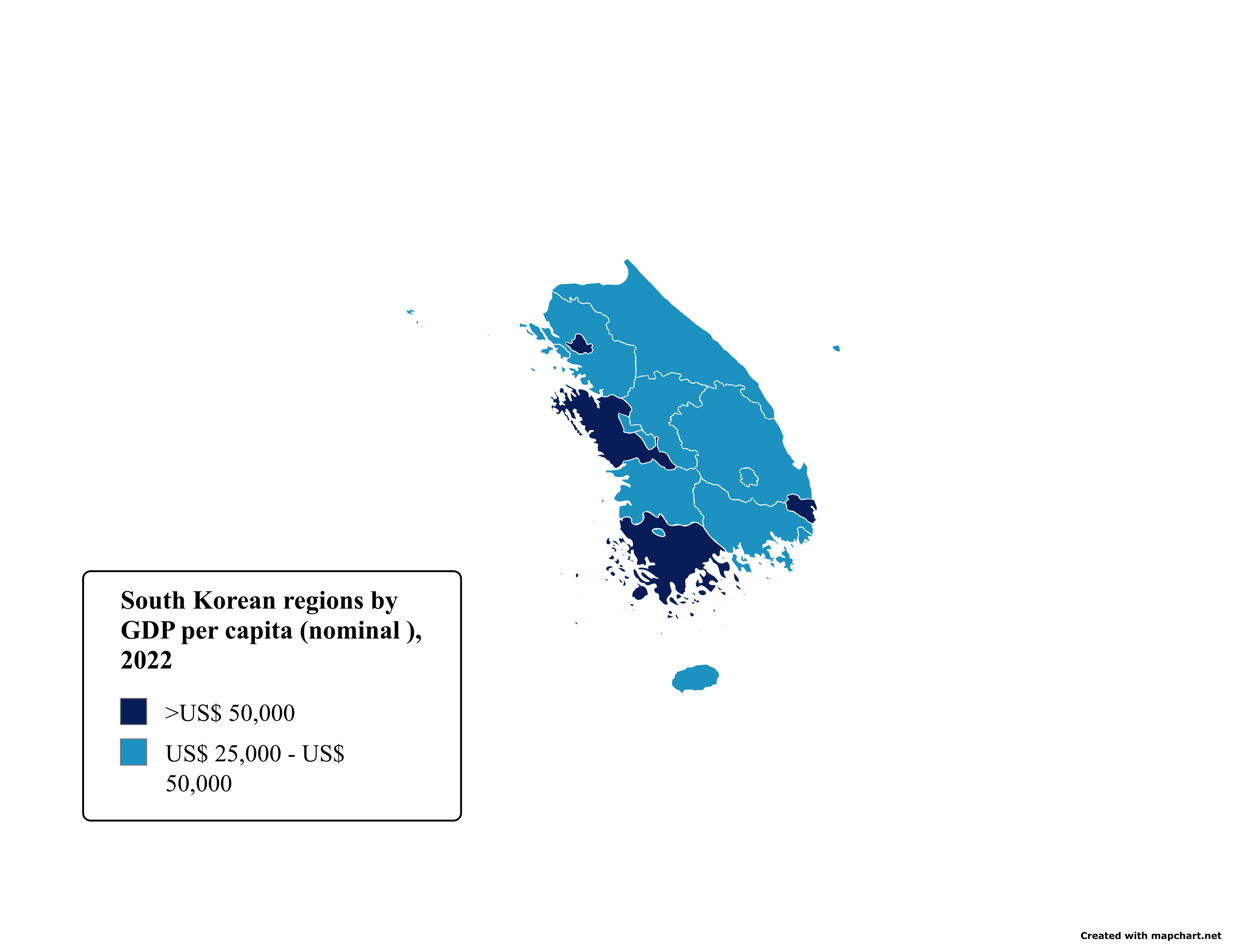
South Korean regions by GDP per capita (nominal), 2022

== Provinces ==
Rank	Province	GDP (₩, 2024)	GDP (US$, 2024)	Per capita (₩, 2024)	Per capita (US$, 2024)	Per capita (US$ PPP, 2024)
1	Gyeonggi Province	₩ 651,417 billion	US$ 455.992 billion	₩ 46,996,000	US$ 32,897	US$ 59,817
2	South Gyeongsang Province	₩ 151,241 billion	US$ 105.869 billion	₩ 46,550,000	US$ 32,585	US$ 59,249
3	South Chungcheong Province	₩ 150,681 billion	US$ 105.477 billion	₩ 67,758,000	US$ 47,431	US$ 86,243
4	North Gyeongsang Province	₩ 134,698 billion	US$ 94.289 billion	₩ 52,298,000	US$ 36,609	US$ 66,565
5	South Jeolla Province	₩ 103,971 billion	US$ 72.780 billion	₩ 59,177,000	US$ 41,424	US$ 75,321
6	North Chungcheong Province	₩ 91,794 billion	US$ 64.256 billion	₩ 56,328,000	US$ 39,430	US$ 71,695
7	North Jeolla Province	₩ 66,792 billion	US$ 46.754 billion	₩ 37,980,000	US$ 26,526	US$ 48,341
8	Gangwon Province, South Korea	₩ 64,616 billion	US$ 45.231 billion	₩ 42,563,000	US$ 27,794	US$ 54,175
9	Jeju Province	₩ 26,928 billion	US$ 18.850 billion	₩ 39,914,000	US$ 27,940	US$ 50,803

== Cities ==
Rank	City	GDP (₩, 2024)	GDP (US$, 2024)	GDP per capita (₩, 2024)	GDP per capita (US$, 2024)	GDP per capita (US$ PPP, 2024)
1	Seoul	₩ 575,035 billion	US$ 402.525 billion	₩ 61,215,000	US$ 42,851	US$ 77,915
2	Incheon	₩ 125,592 billion	US$ 87.914 billion	₩ 41,187,000	US$ 28,831	US$ 52,423
3	Busan	₩ 121,067 billion	US$ 84.747 billion	₩ 37,085,000	US$ 25,960	US$ 47,252
4	Ulsan	₩ 93,956 billion	US$ 65.769 billion	₩ 85,194,000	US$ 59,636	US$ 108,436
5	Daegu	₩ 74,524 billion	US$ 52.167 billion	₩ 31,374,000	US$ 21,962	US$ 39,933
6	Daejeon	₩ 56,299 trillion	US$ 39.409 billion	₩ 38,220,000	US$ 26,754	US$ 48,647
7	Gwangju	₩ 54,837 billion	US$ 38.386 billion	₩ 37,675,000	US$ 26,373	US$ 47,953
8	Sejong	₩ 17,361 billion	US$ 12.153 billion	₩ 44,610,000	US$ 31,227	US$ 56,780

== See also ==
- Administrative divisions of South Korea
- Economy of South Korea
- List of subnational entities
