= Jongno-dong =

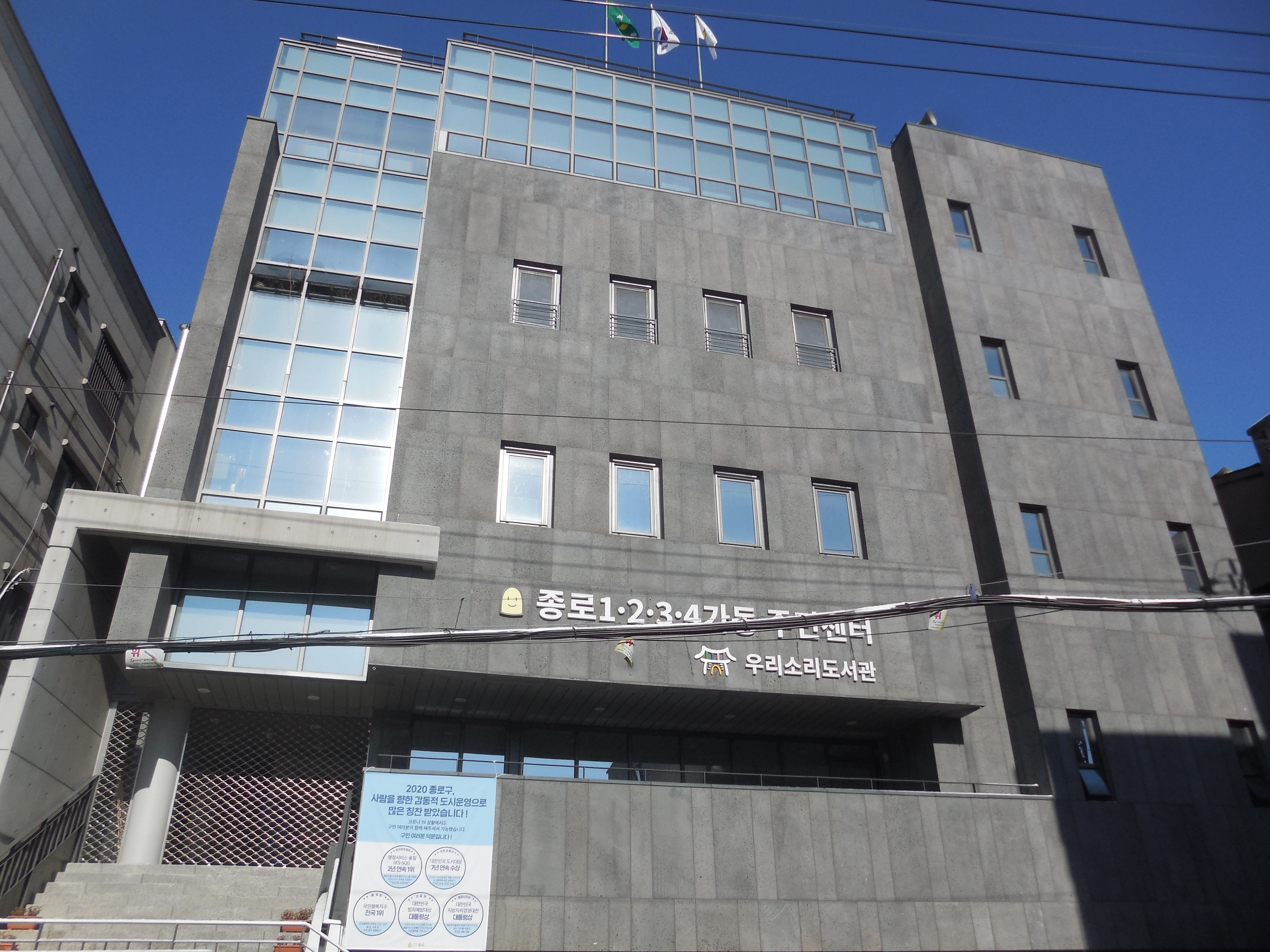
- Jongno 1·2·3·4-ga Community Center
- Interactive map of Jongno-dong
- Country: South Korea

Area
  - Total: 2.96 km^{2} (1.14 sq mi)

Population (2013)
  - Total: 8,797

Korean name
- Hangul: 종로동
- Hanja: 鍾路洞
- RR: Jongno-dong
- MR: Chongno-dong

Jongno-dong (Korean: 종로동) is a collective term for a group of dongs (neighborhoods) in Jongno District, Seoul, South Korea. It is divided into two administrative dongs (Korean: 행정동; Hanja: 行政洞): Jongno 1·2·3·4-ga dong and Jongno 5·6-ga dong.
