= Cheongunhyoja-dong =

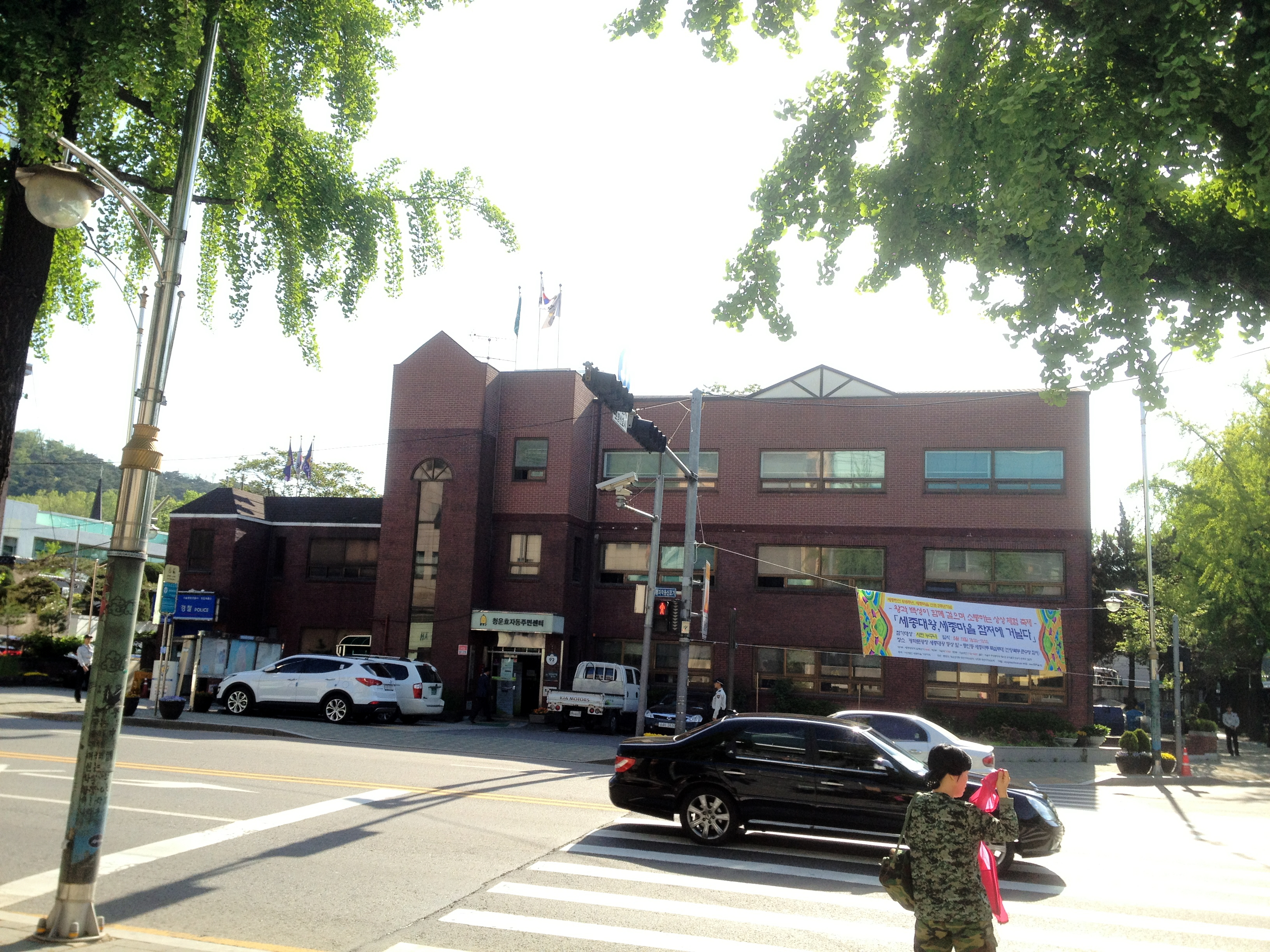
- Interactive map of Cheongunhyoja-dong
- Coordinates: 37.584°N 126.971°E
- Country: South Korea

Population (2013)
  - Total: 14,696

Korean name
- Hangul: 청운효자동
- Hanja: 淸雲孝子洞
- RR: Cheongunhyoja-dong
- MR: Ch'ŏngunhyoja-dong

Cheongunhyoja-dong (Korean: 청운효자동) is a dong (neighborhood) of Jongno District, Seoul, South Korea.
