= The Seoul Institute =

South Korean think tank

- Formation: 1992
- Type: Think Tank
- Location: Seoul, South Korea
- President: OH Kyun
- Website: si.re.kr

- The Seoul Institute
- Hangul: 서울연구원
- Hanja: 서울硏究院
- RR: Seoul yeonguwon
- MR: Sŏul yŏn'guwŏn

The Seoul Institute (SI; Korean: 서울연구원) is the official think tank for Seoul, the capital of South Korea. It was established in 1992 by the Seoul Metropolitan Government as The Seoul Development Institute (SDI), and its name was changed to The Seoul Institute on October 1, 2012.

The Seoul Institute aims "to upgrade SMG's policies and to improve the quality of life of Seoul citizens through professional research". Utilizing their in-depth understanding of municipal administration, expertise in policy area in charge, and vast knowledge of overseas cases, Seoul institute researchers support the policy-making processes of the Seoul Metropolitan Government.

According to the official website, "The Seoul Institute's goal is to establish a medium to long-term vision for Seoul and propose social policies on welfare, culture, education, and industries and urban management policies on city planning, transportation, safety and the environment. SI's primary objective is to improve municipal administration through professional research, improve the quality of life in Seoul, and reinforce and sustain the competitiveness of Seoul."

== Research departments ==
- Department of Future and Social Policy Research
- Department of Civil Economy Research
- Department of Transportation Systems Research
- Department of Safety and Environment Research
- Department of Urban Planning and Design Research
- Urban Data and Information Center
- Strategic Research Center
- Megacity Research Center (Megacity Think-Tank Alliance (MeTTA))
- Seoul Public Investment Management Service

== Six Major Research Tasks of the SI ==
1. Acceleration of 'future studies' required to design the Seoul of the post-growth era.
2. Selection of 'citizen participatory' research topics and establishment of open-type research platforms.
3. Enhancement of expert collaboration networks to realize 'research innovations.'
4. Support of urban diplomacy of Seoul through the creation of the Global Cities Research Center.
5. Establishment of the Strategy Research Center with the aim of reviewing imminent municipal issues and discovering major agenda items of the future.
6. Supply of major research results through 'Infographics'.

== Publications ==
Aside from various reports, SI regularly publishes a wide array of material including research on policy reports, global city trends, urban research in Seoul, economics in Seoul and administrative trends of Seoul.

== History ==
- 2014.08.20 Kim Soo-Hyun was inaugurated as the 14th President
- 2012.07.26 Renamed as the Seoul Institute
- 2012.02.17 Chang-Hyon was inaugurated as the 13th President
- 2011.01.28 Kim Sang-beom was inaugurated as the 12th President
- 2007.11.05 Jeong Mun-Geon was inaugurated as the 11th President
- 2007.01.15 Je Ta-Ryong was inaugurated as the 10th President
- 2005.08.26 Kang Man-su was inaugurated as the 9th President
- 2003.01.27 The complex was relocated to Seocho-dong
- 2002.08.26 Paek Yong-ho was inaugurated as the 8th President
- 1999.10.18 Gwon Won-Yong was inaugurated as the 7th President
- 1998.08.06 Gang Hong-bin was inaugurated as the 6th President
- 1997.02.01 Seo Jun-Ho was inaugurated as the 5th President
- 1996.06.10 Lee beon-song was inaugurated as the 4th President
- 1996.02.10 Lee beon-song was inaugurated as the 3rd President
- 1994.09.23 Jeong Se-Uk was inaugurated as the 2nd President
- 1992.10.01 The Seoul Development Institute launched
- 1992.09.23 Choi Sang-Chol was inaugurated as the 1st President
- 1992.07.14 Approval of establishment of foundation
- 1992.01.15 Promulgation of the Ordinance on the Promotion of the Seoul Development Institute
