= Sogong-dong =

Neighbourhood in Seoul, South Korea

- Sogong-dong in 2024

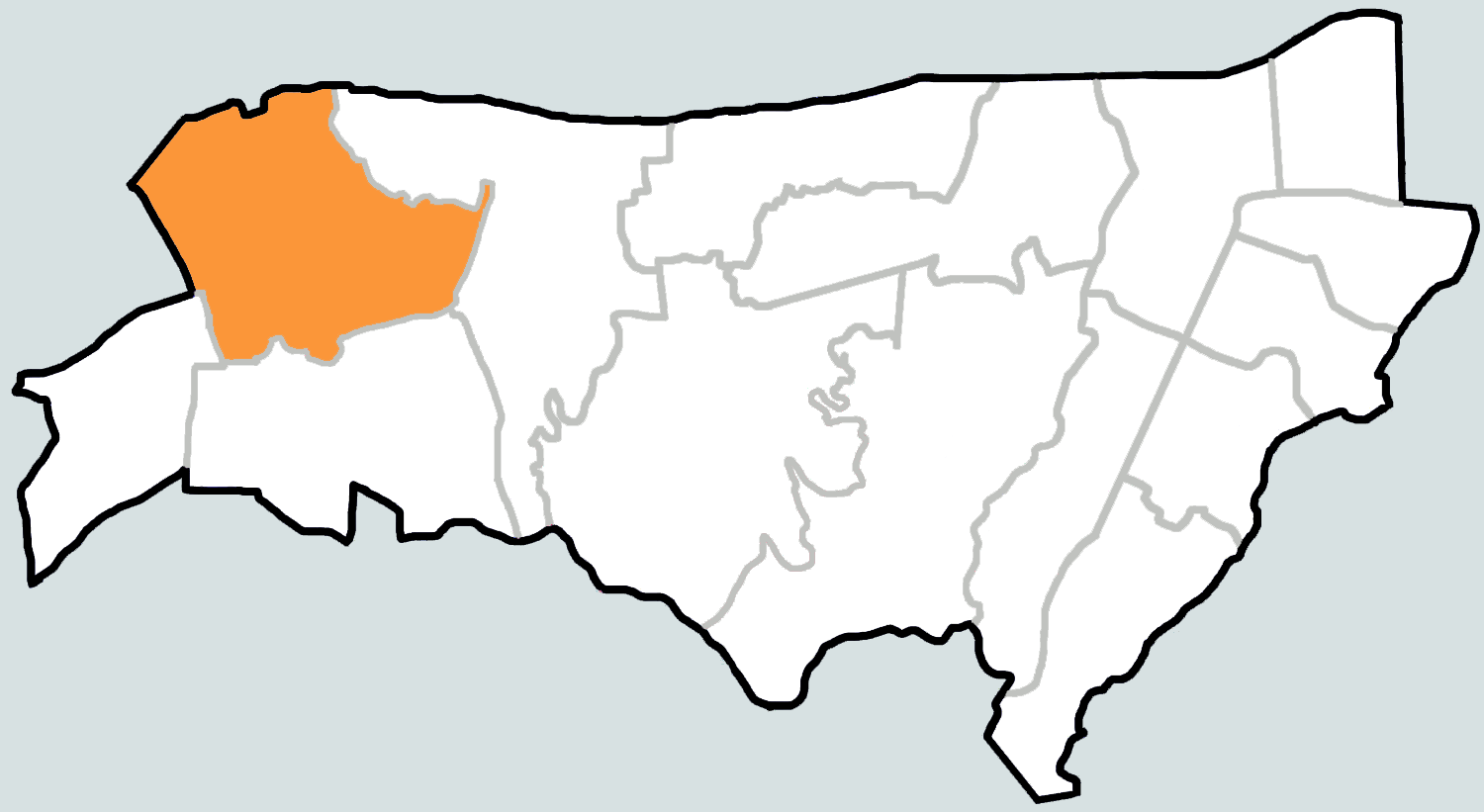
- Country: South Korea

Area
  - Total: 0.95 km^{2} (0.37 sq mi)

Population (2013)
  - Total: 1,347
  - Density: 1,400/km^{2} (3,700/sq mi)

Korean name
- Hangul: 소공동
- Hanja: 小公洞
- RR: Sogong-dong
- MR: Sogong-dong

Sogong-dong (Korean: 소공동) is a dong (neighborhood) of Jung District, Seoul, South Korea.

== Economy ==
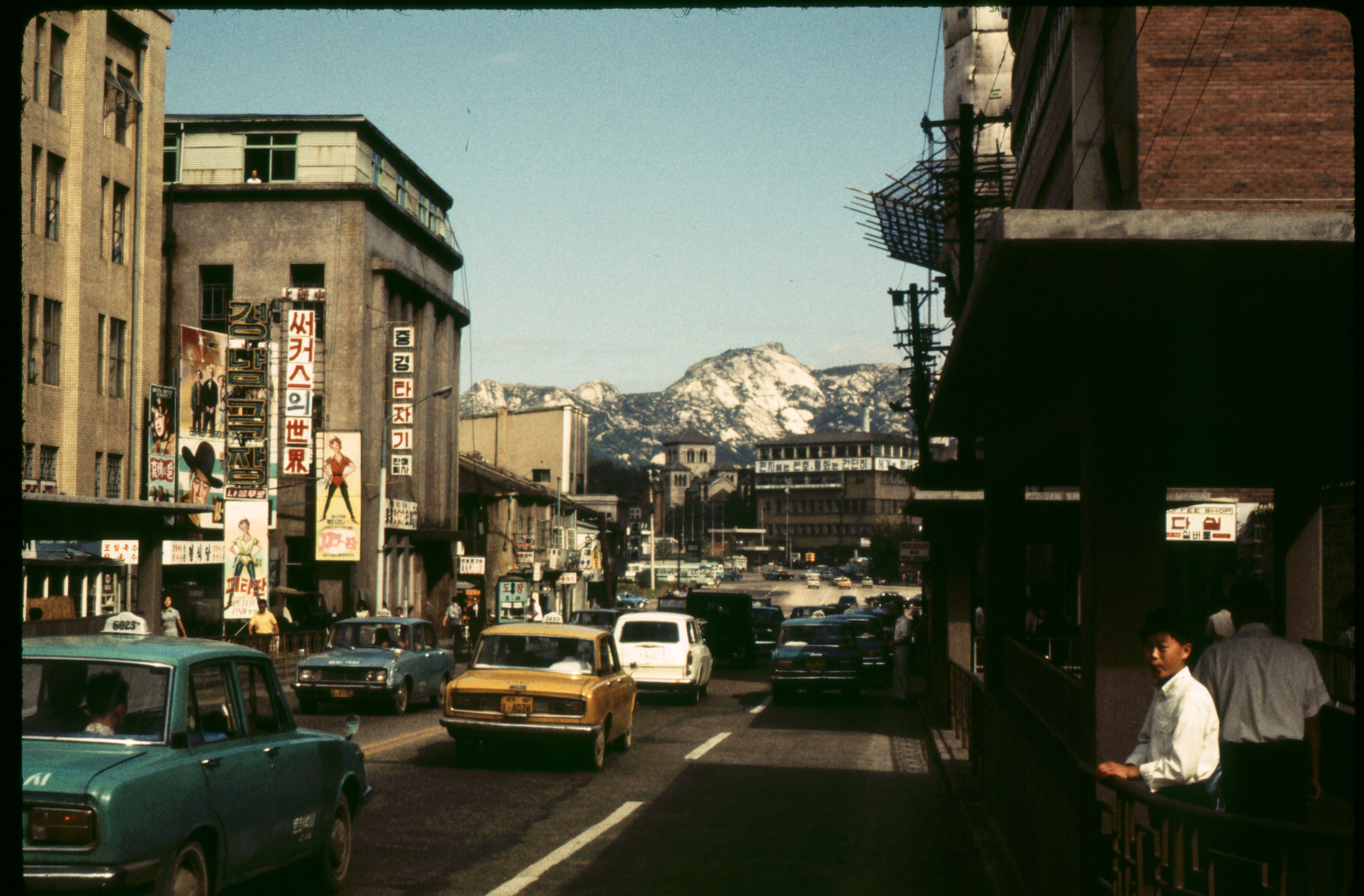
Sogong-dong, August 1970

All Nippon Airways operates the Seoul Office in Room 1501 on the 15th floor of the Center Building in Sogong-dong. Hainan Airlines operates its South Korea office in Suite 1501 of the Samyoung Building in Sogong-dong.

== Attractions ==
- Wongudan
- Deoksugung

== Transportation ==
- City Hall Station (Seoul) of and of
- Seodaemun Station of

== Bukchang-dong ==
Bukchang-dong
- Interactive map of Bukchang-dong
- Country: South Korea

Korean name
- Hangul: 북창동
- Hanja: 北倉洞
- RR: Bukchang-dong
- MR: Pukch'ang-dong

Bukchang-dong (Korean: 북창동) is a legal dong with its administrative dong being Sogong-dong ( 37.562°N 126.978°E).

== See also ==
- Administrative divisions of South Korea
