= Euljiro-dong =

Neighborhood in Seoul, South Korea

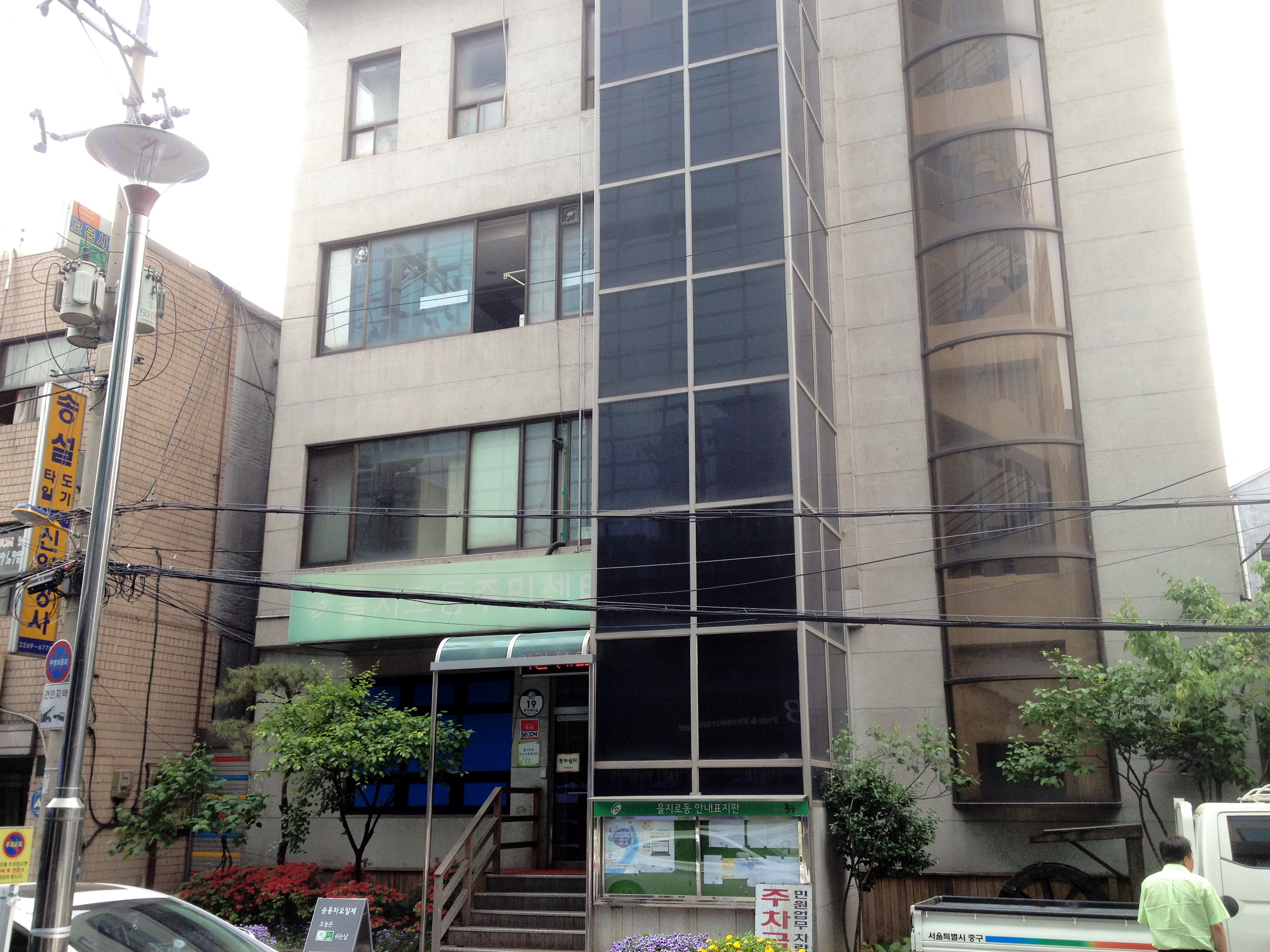
- View of Euljiro 3-ga road and buildings Euljiro-dong Resident Office

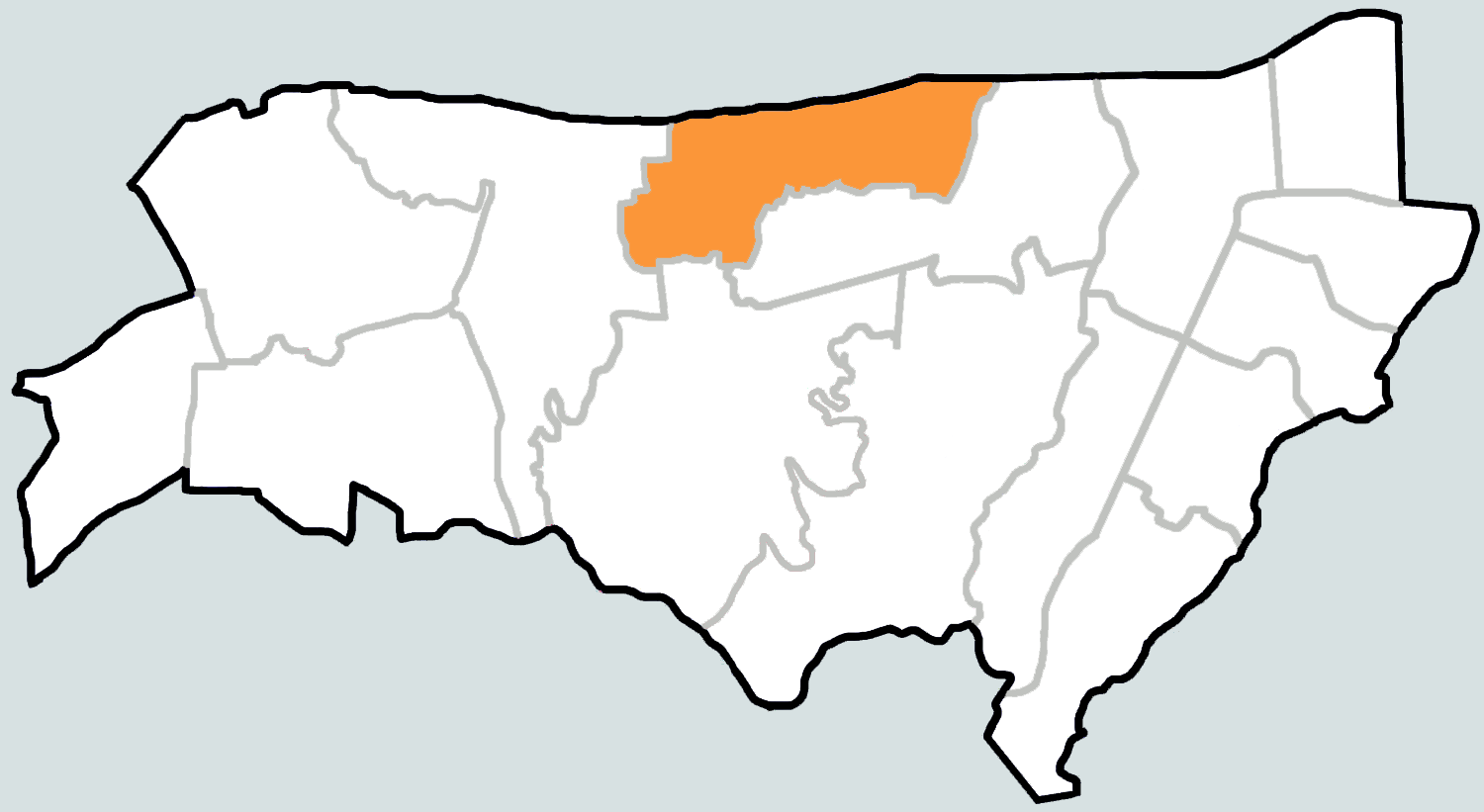
- Country: South Korea

Area
  - Total: 0.60 km^{2} (0.23 sq mi)

Population (2013)
  - Total: 1,947
  - Density: 3,200/km^{2} (8,400/sq mi)

Korean name
- Hangul: 을지로동
- Hanja: 乙支路洞
- RR: Euljiro-dong
- MR: Ŭlchiro-dong

Euljiro-dong (Korean: 을지로동) is a dong (neighborhood) of Jung District, Seoul, South Korea.

== Transportation ==
- Euljiro 3-ga Station of and of
- Euljiro 4-ga Station on and of

== See also ==
- Administrative divisions of South Korea
- Euljiro
