= Namyang Dairy Products =

Korean food and dairy corporation

- Hangul: 남양유업
- Hanja: 南陽乳業
- RR: Namyang yueop
- MR: Namyang yuŏp

Namyang Dairy Products (Korean: 남양유업; Hanja: 南陽乳業) is a food and dairy corporation headquartered in Seoul, Korea. It is one of South Korea's largest dairy manufacturers, along with Seoul Milk and Maeil Holdings.

It was founded by Chairman Hong Doo-young in 1964. In the early days of the business, Namyang Milk Powder, a baby formula, was produced.

== See also ==
- Seoul Milk
- Maeil Holdings
- Economy of South Korea
