= Samcheong-dong =

Neighborhood of Seoul, South Korea

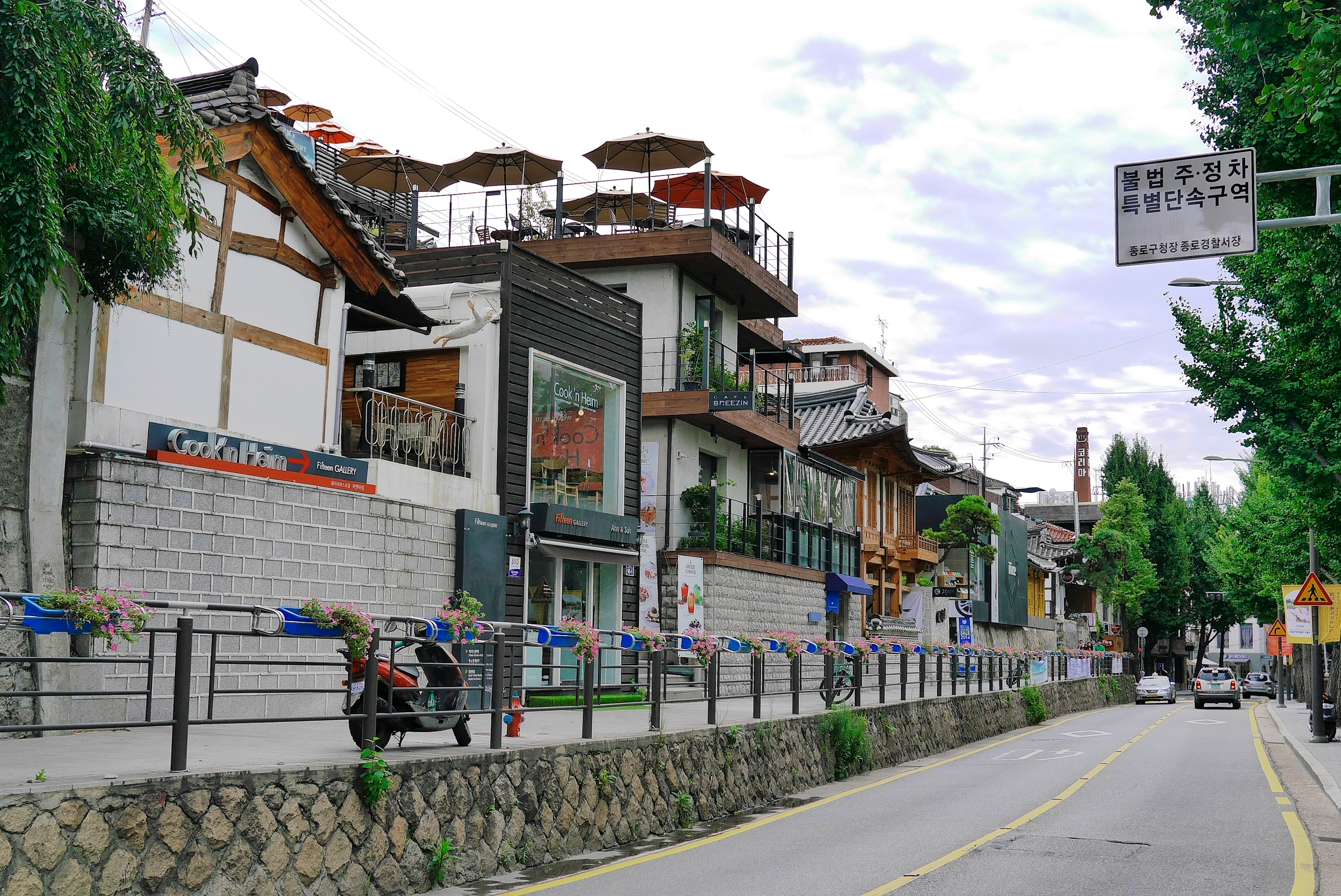
- Interactive map of Samcheong-dong
- Coordinates: 37°35′6.3″N 126°58′49.3″E
- Country: South Korea

Area
  - Total: 1.49 km^{2} (0.58 sq mi)

Population (2001)
  - Total: 5,374
  - Density: 3,610/km^{2} (9,340/sq mi)

Korean name
- Hangul: 삼청동
- Hanja: 三淸洞
- RR: Samcheong-dong
- MR: Samch'ŏng-dong

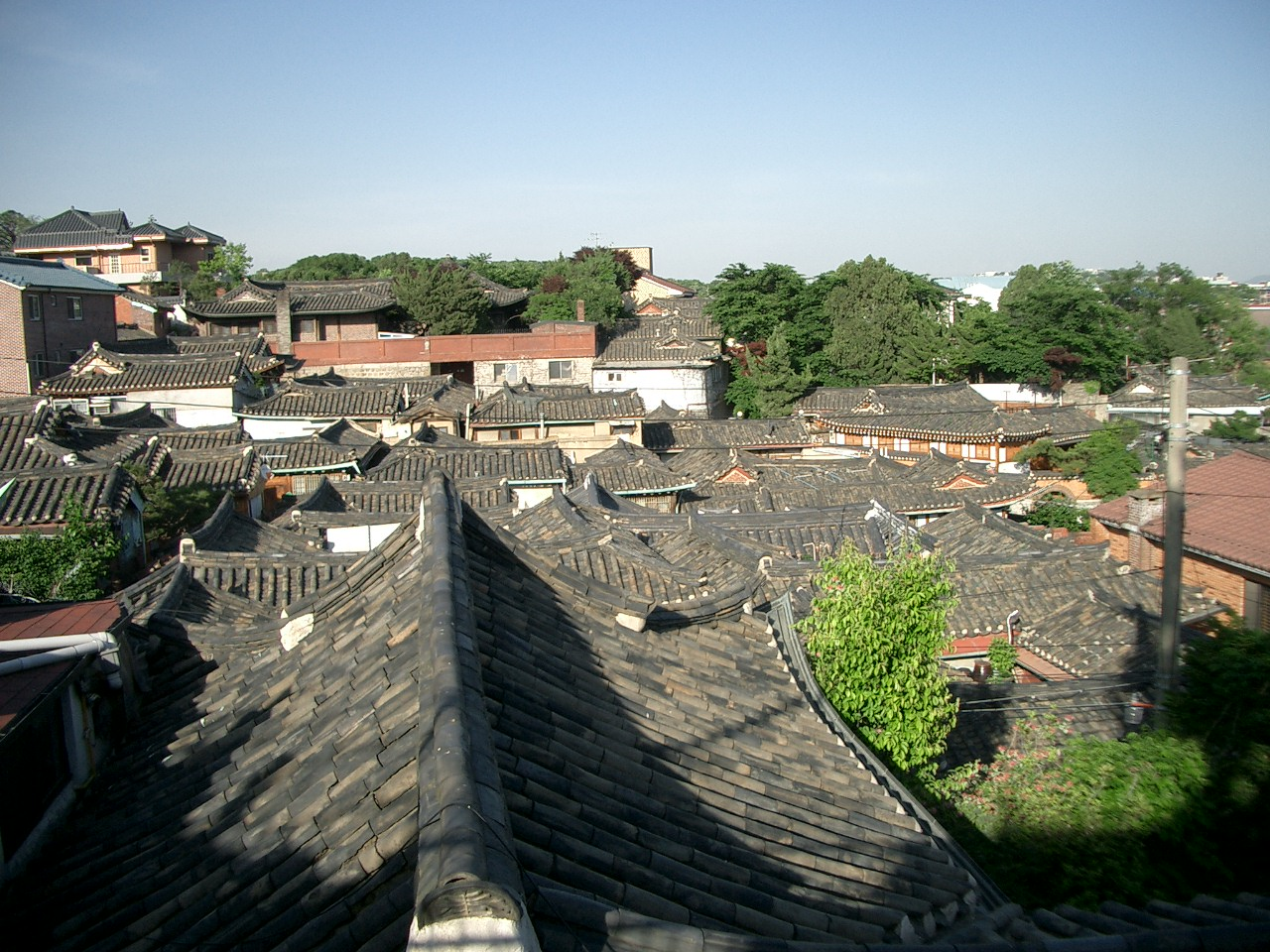
Samcheongdong traditional houses

Samcheong-dong (Korean: 삼청동) is a dong (neighbourhood) of Jongno District, Seoul, South Korea. It lies north of Jongno and east of Gyeongbokgung. This hilly neighborhood is characterized by numerous small art galleries, shops, and restaurants. Visitors to the area can see restored hanok, Korean traditional-style houses. The Board of Audit and Inspection of Korea is located here. It is also home to several foreign government offices including the Vietnamese consulate.

== Attraction ==
- National Folk Museum of Korea
- Velvet and Incubator art galleries

== See also ==
- Administrative divisions of South Korea
