= Gyonam-dong =

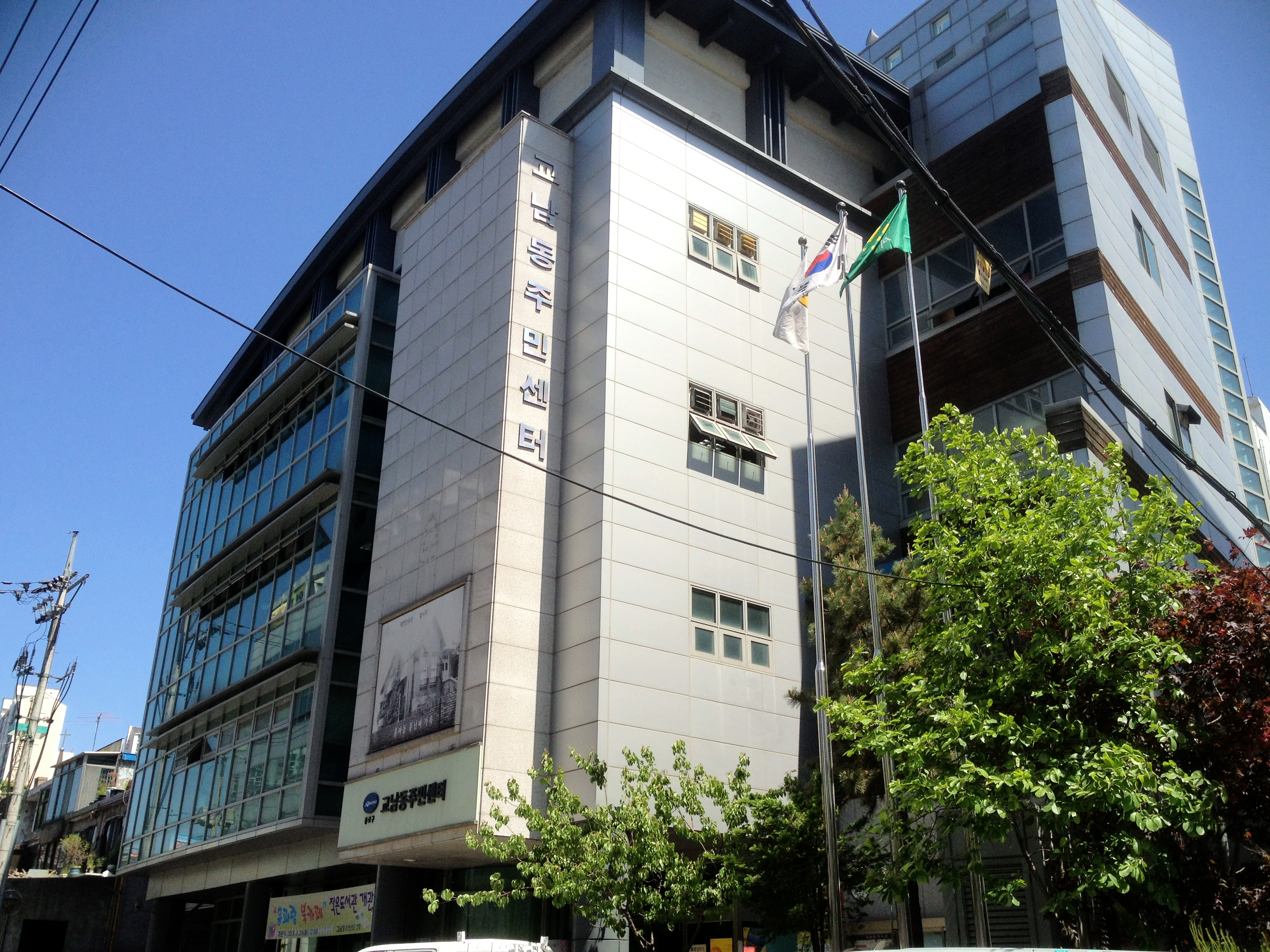
- Gyonam-dong Community Service Center
- Interactive map of Gyonam-dong
- Country: South Korea

Area
  - Total: 0.35 km^{2} (0.14 sq mi)

Population (2001)
  - Total: 9,291
  - Density: 27,000/km^{2} (69,000/sq mi)

Korean name
- Hangul: 교남동
- Hanja: 橋南洞
- RR: Gyonam-dong
- MR: Kyonam-dong

Gyonam-dong (Korean: 교남동) is a dong (neighborhood) of Jongno District, Seoul, South Korea.

== See also ==
- Administrative divisions of South Korea
