= Deoksugung =

Palace in Seoul, South Korea

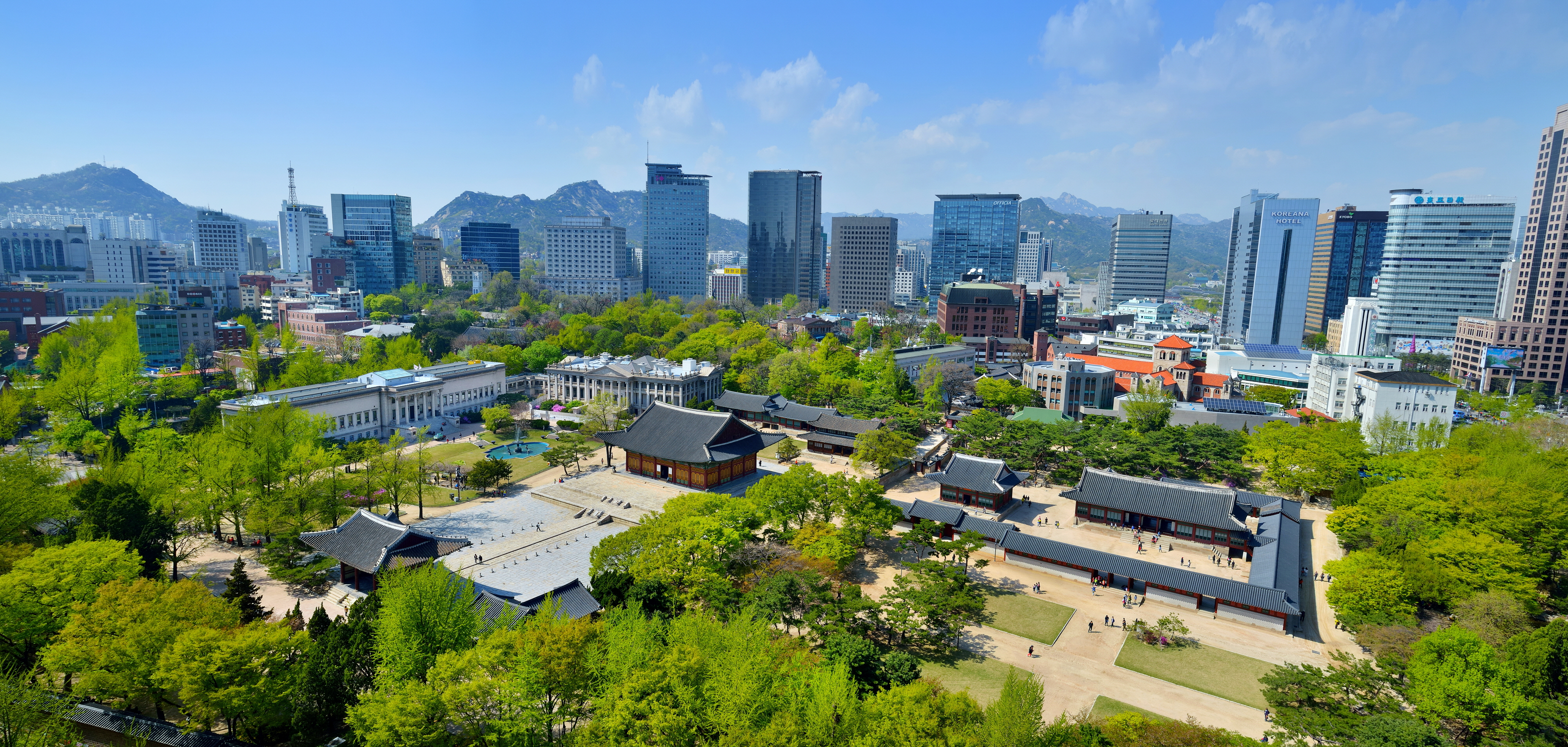
- Overview of the palace (2013)
- Former names: Gyeongungung

General information
- Type: Royal palace (former)
- Location: Seoul, South Korea
- Coordinates: 37°33′58″N 126°58′30″E
- Inaugurated: 1611

Design and construction
- Designations

Historic Sites of South Korea
- Official name: Deoksugung Palace
- Designated: January 18, 1963

Korean name
- Hangul: 덕수궁
- Hanja: 德壽宮
- RR: Deoksugung
- MR: Tŏksugung

Deoksugung (Korean: 덕수궁; Hanja: 德壽宮), also called Deoksu Palace or Deoksugung Palace, is a former royal palace in Seoul, South Korea. It was the main palace during the Korean Empire (1897–1910) and is now a major tourist attraction. It has a mix of traditional Korean and Western architecture that reflects its history. Inside the palace are the Daehan Empire History Museum and the National Museum of Modern and Contemporary Art, Deoksugung branch.

The palace was first used as a temporary palace by King Seonjo during the 1592–1598 Imjin War, when the other palaces had been destroyed. In 1611, it was made an official palace named Gyeongungung (it was renamed "Deoksugung" in 1907). The palace then went largely unused until the late 19th century.

In 1897, Gojong declared the creation of the Korean Empire and made Gyeongungung the empire's main palace. He attempted to make the palace a symbol of Korea's efforts to modernize. He rapidly expanded it by acquiring land from nearby properties and constructing new buildings in both Korean and Western styles. Under his tenure, the palace's major buildings Junghwajeon and Seokjojeon were constructed. Despite his efforts to keep Korea independent, he was forced to abdicate in 1907 and Korea was colonized by Japan in 1910. He lived in the palace until his death in 1919.

After Gojong's death, the colonial government moved quickly to sell off and dismantle the palace's property. By 1930, 18 of the original buildings were left. In 1933, the palace was made a public park. In 1938, a West Wing was constructed for Seokjojeon, and together the two buildings became the Yi Royal Family Art Museum. After these efforts to open the palace to the public, just 8 of the original buildings remained.

Even for decades after the 1945 liberation of Korea, the palace continued to function as a public park, with some public works projects further altering or decreasing the size of the palace. One scholar estimated the palace's current size to be 1/3rd of its peak size. Efforts to restore its pre-colonial appearance began in the 1980s. In 2004, a comprehensive plan to restore aspects of the palace was enacted. As part of this plan, a number of buildings and structures have been recreated or moved back to their original pre-colonial spots based on historical research.

== History ==
=== Joseon period ===
The site the palace now occupies once contained the tomb of Queen Sindeok, the second wife of the Joseon founding king Taejo (r. 1392–1398). During the reign of Taejong (r. 1400–1418), the tomb was moved elsewhere. Grand Prince Wolsan, the elder brother of King Seongjong, constructed his residence in the area. In the early stages of the 1592–1598 Imjin War, King Seonjo fled Seoul. In his absence, the palaces in the city were destroyed by fire. Upon his return to Seoul in 1593, he stayed in the area, which was dubbed the Jeongneung-dong Haenggung (정릉동 행궁; 貞陵洞行宮). He would eventually die there.

King Gwanghaegun then ascended the throne at the palace. In 1611, Changdeokgung was adequately repaired, and Gwanghaegun moved over to that palace. He then upgraded Haenggung to a full palace and selected a new name for it: Gyeongungung (경운궁; 慶運宮). He ordered that Gyeongungung's facilities be maintained so that they could be used as a secondary palace. Several months later, he moved back to Gyeongungung. While repairing other palaces, he ordered that several of Gyeongungung's structures be disassembled and their materials used in other palaces. In 1618, Seonjo's former wife Queen Inmok was forcefully confined in the palace. In 1623, King Injo ordered that all buildings except for two in Gyeongungung be returned to their original owners.

For much of the later Joseon period, Gyeongungung was considered to have lesser facilities, and thus went largely unused by the Korean royal family. It was renovated in 1679 and visited four times by King Yeongjo between 1748 and 1775. An article in the Encyclopedia of Korean Culture argues it was otherwise disregarded to the extent of not appearing on a number of late Joseon maps. After 1884 failed Gapsin Coup, various foreign missions were granted permission to be established around Gyeongungung. To its west was the Russian legation and American legation. To its north is the Embassy of the United Kingdom. In 1893, the Korean monarch Gojong held a ceremony at Gyeongungung for the 300th anniversary of Seonjo returning to Seoul. Historian An Chang-mo (안창모) argues that the palace held symbolism to Gojong as a place where the monarch stayed during a foreign invasion crisis.

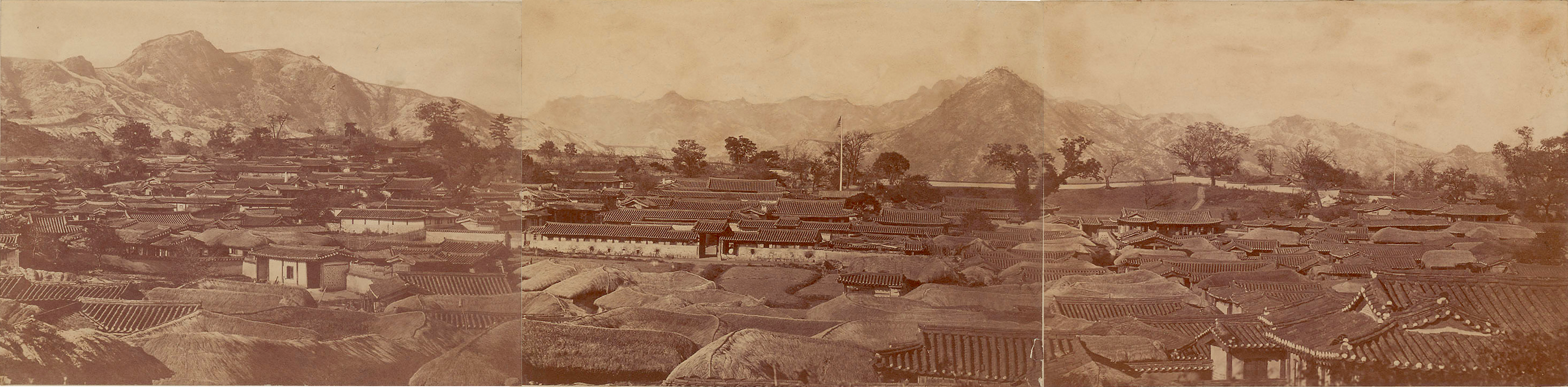
The site of the palace, taken by Ogawa Kazumasa (1886)

=== Korean Empire period ===
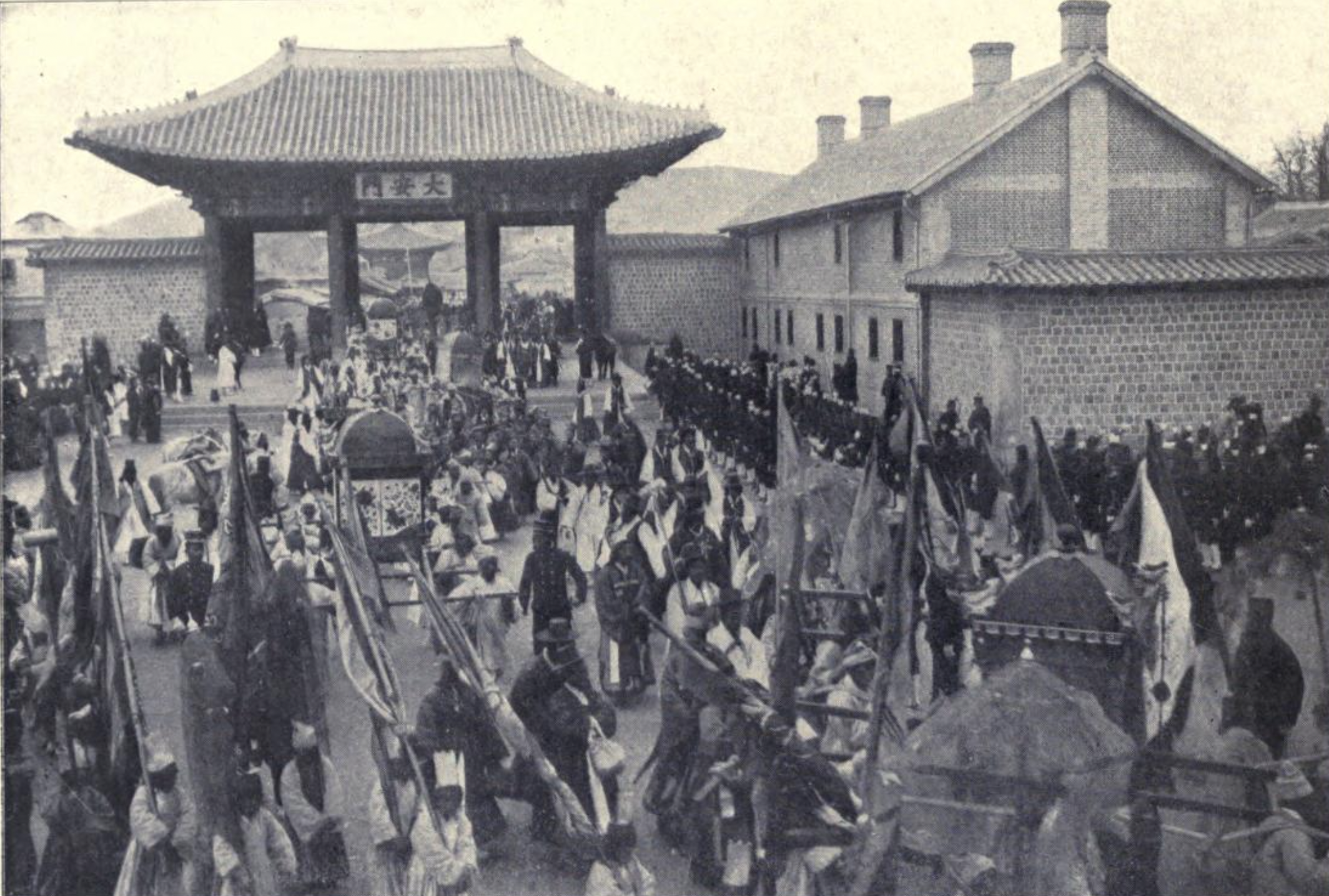
An imperial procession passing through the gate Daeanmun (1899)

After the 1895 assassination of the Korean Queen Min, the Korean monarch Gojong fled for safety in the Russian legation in early 1896. Rather than return to Gyeongbokgung, where Min had been assassinated, Gojong chose to make Gyeongungung his residence for its proximity to the legations, which he believed could help protect him from Japan. At the time, the palace only had a small number of buildings. Around a week after his arrival in the legation, he began ordering the renovation and expansion of Gyeongungung. The first round of renovations were completed on September 28, 1896. They then held a state funeral for Min, whom was posthumously dubbed Empress Myeongseong, wherein her remains were transferred from Gyeongbokgung to Gyeongungung. On February 20, 1897, Gojong left the Russian legation and moved into Gyeongungung. That year, he ordered road infrastructure around the palace be significantly reconstructed. After crowning himself emperor at a ceremony at the nearby Hwangudan, on October 13, 1897, he officially proclaimed the Korean Empire.

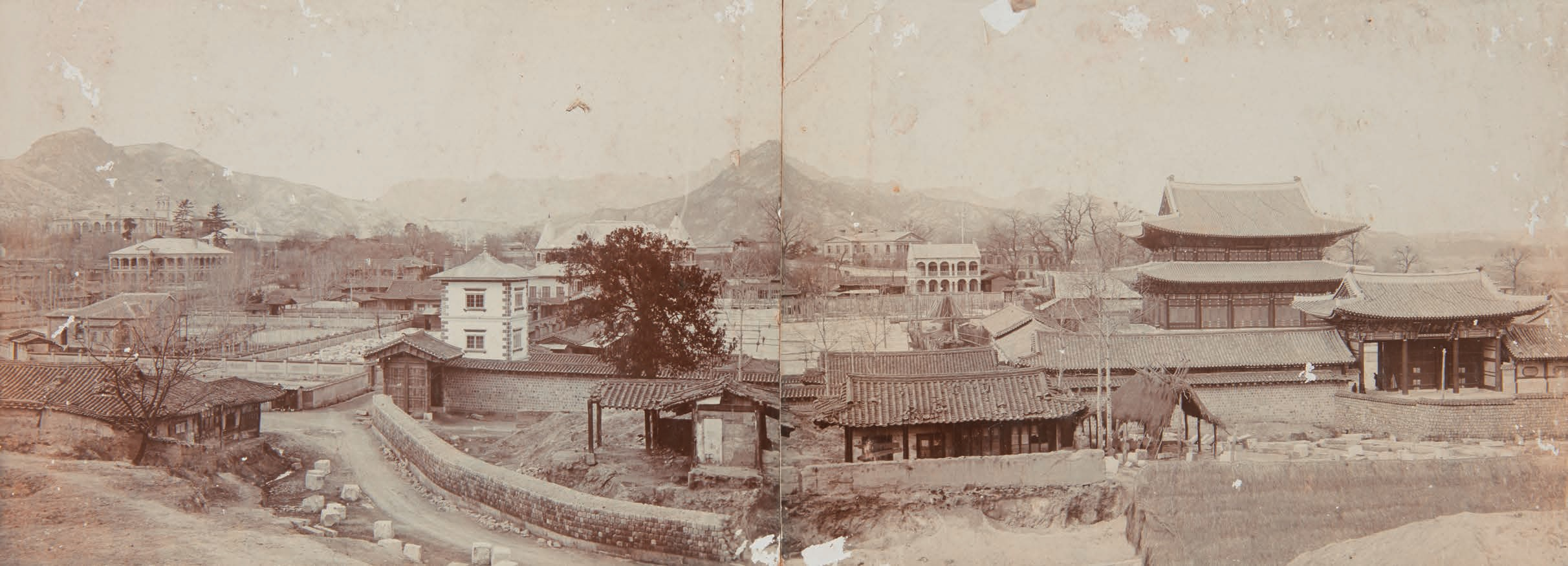
View of the palace from the south, before the fire (1902)

Gojong attempted to make the palace a symbol of Korea's modernization efforts. The palace grounds were expanded in three directions: north, west, and south. To the east was a major road and dense city. The palace, unlike the previous main palaces in Seoul, was built and grew under the restrictions of being within a well-established city. Land was purchased from various groups, but this was not always possible or easily done, especially when foreign land owners and consulates were involved. Nearby buildings had height restrictions issued, in order to prevent them from looking over into the palace.

On April 14, 1904, a major fire started in Hamnyeongjeon. While Hamnyeongjeon was Gojong's sleeping quarters, at the time he was at Gwanmyeongjeon while Hamnyeongjeon was undergoing repairs. The fire destroyed most of the buildings, including Jungmyeongjeon, Seogeodang, and Jeokjodang, which had dated to the time of Seonjo. A number of buildings on the north, northeast, and east side of the palace were spared from the fire. Numerous valuables were destroyed, with only some rescued. Most of Gojong's ministers and the Japanese minister advised Gojong to return to Gyeongbokgung, but Gojong refused. Restoration work began the following day. Repair costs were enormous and exceeded the total annual budget of the Korean Empire. By 1905, the buildings Jeukjodang, Seogeodang, Gyeonghyojeon, Jungmyeongjeon, Heummungak, and Hamnyeongjeon were rebuilt. A number of these were built smaller than their original form. The gates Junghwamun and Jowunmun were also completed in that year. In 1906, the main building Junghwajeon and the main gate Daeanmun were both completed.

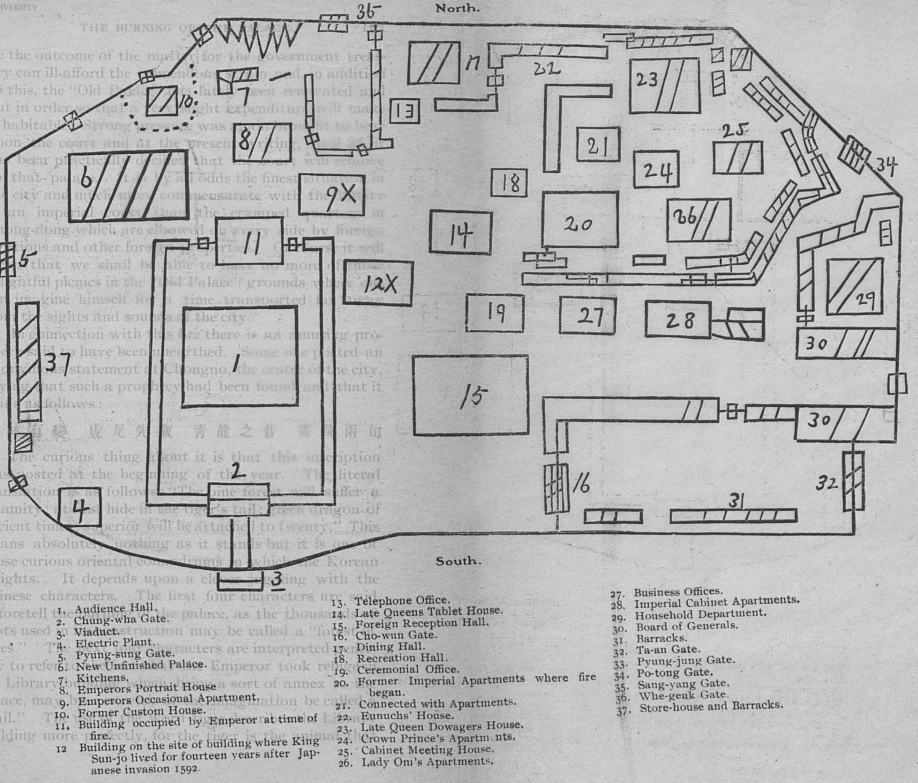
Homer Hulbert's rough map of the palace and the damage the fire caused. Buildings with diagonal lines through them were unaffected by the fire.

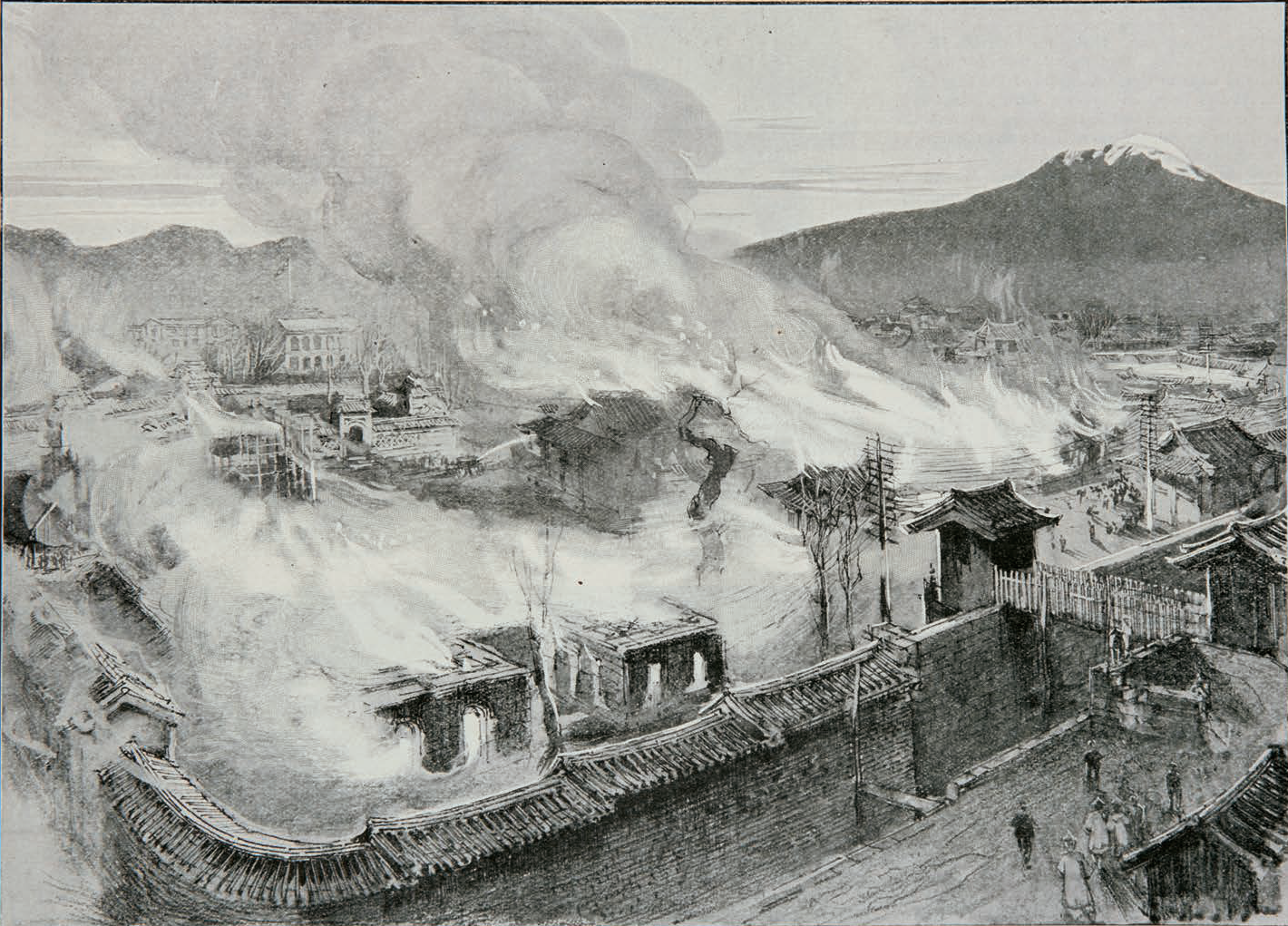
Drawing of the fire (1904)

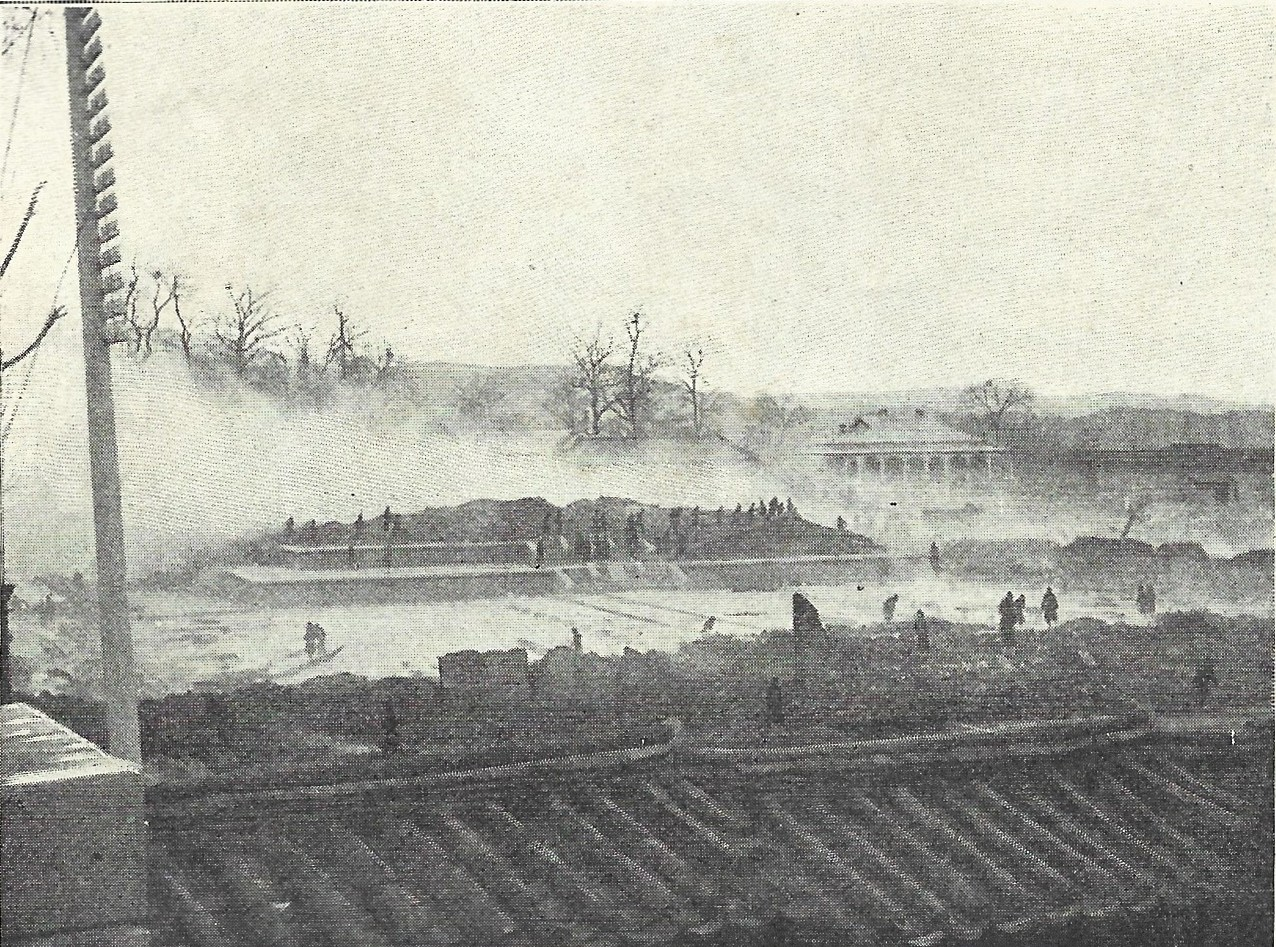
Smouldering ruins of Junghwajeon after the fire (1904)

In 1907, Gojong was made to abdicate in favor of his son, Sunjong. In August 1907, Sunjong's coronation ceremony was a relatively simple affair held at Dondeokjeon. Afterwards, Sunjong used Changdeokgung as his primary palace, possibly at the behest of the Japanese, who wished to isolate him from Gojong. That year, Gyeongungung was renamed Deoksugung. Gojong continued to live there in the building Hamnyeongjeon. In 1910, the building Seokjojeon was completed.

=== Colonial period ===
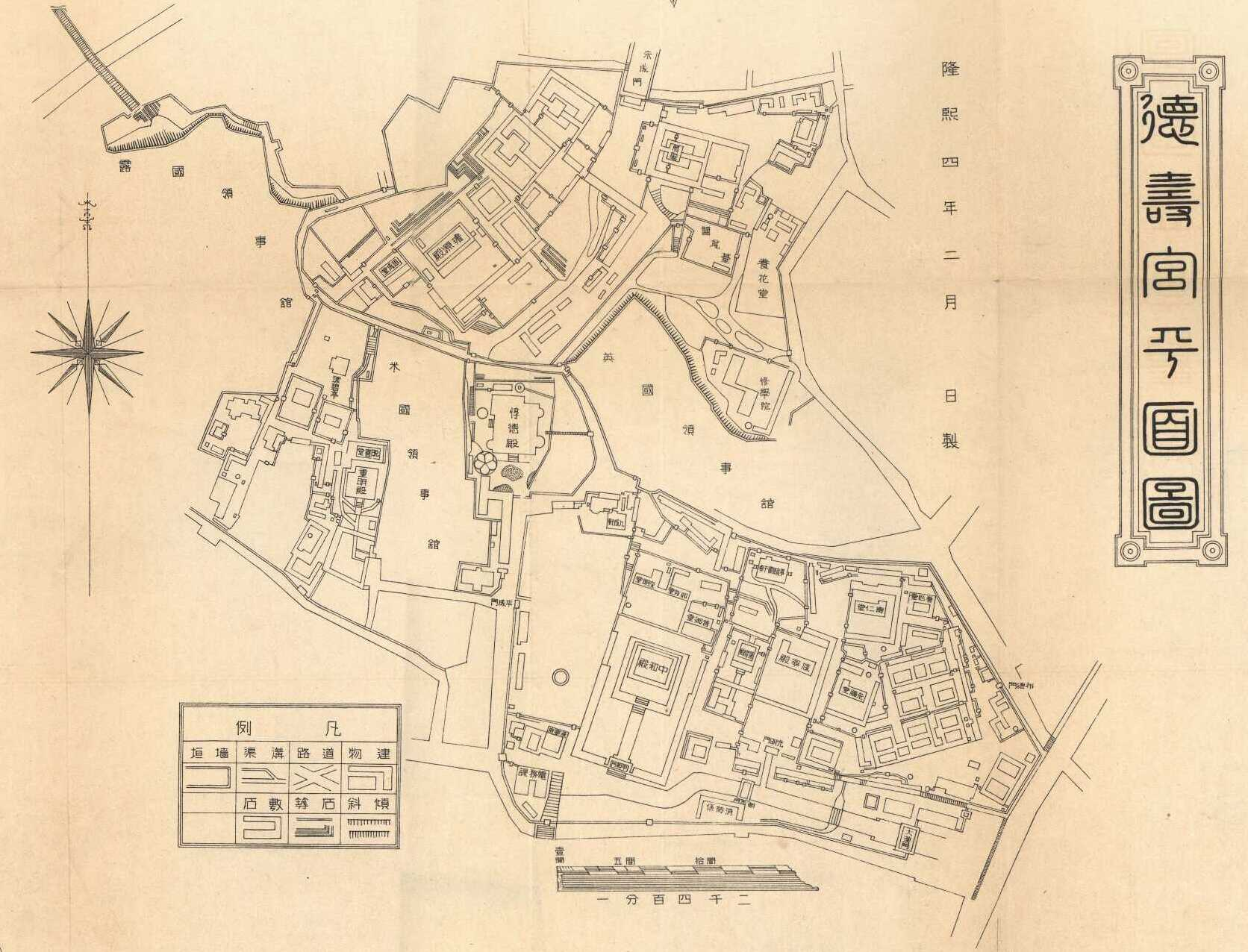
Map of Deoksugung in its February 1910 state (published 1938)

In May 1912, the adjacent road Taepyeongno was made to cut straight through the eastern side of the palace. The gate Podeokmun, its adjacent buildings, and the large plaza in front of Daehanmun were demolished. The palace's eastern wall was pushed inwards. Numerous former guest houses for the palace became separate from the palace; these extended into what is today Seoul Plaza.

The death of Gojong in 1919 was a significant turning point for the palace. The palace was managed by the Office of the Yi Dynasty, although the royal family ceased using the palace significantly. The Government-General of Chōsen began downsizing, dismantling, and selling off portions of the palace. The Seonwonjeon area, in the northwest of the palace, was the first to be dismantled and sold off; two schools were built in its place by 1923. By 1930, there were 18 of the original palace buildings left.

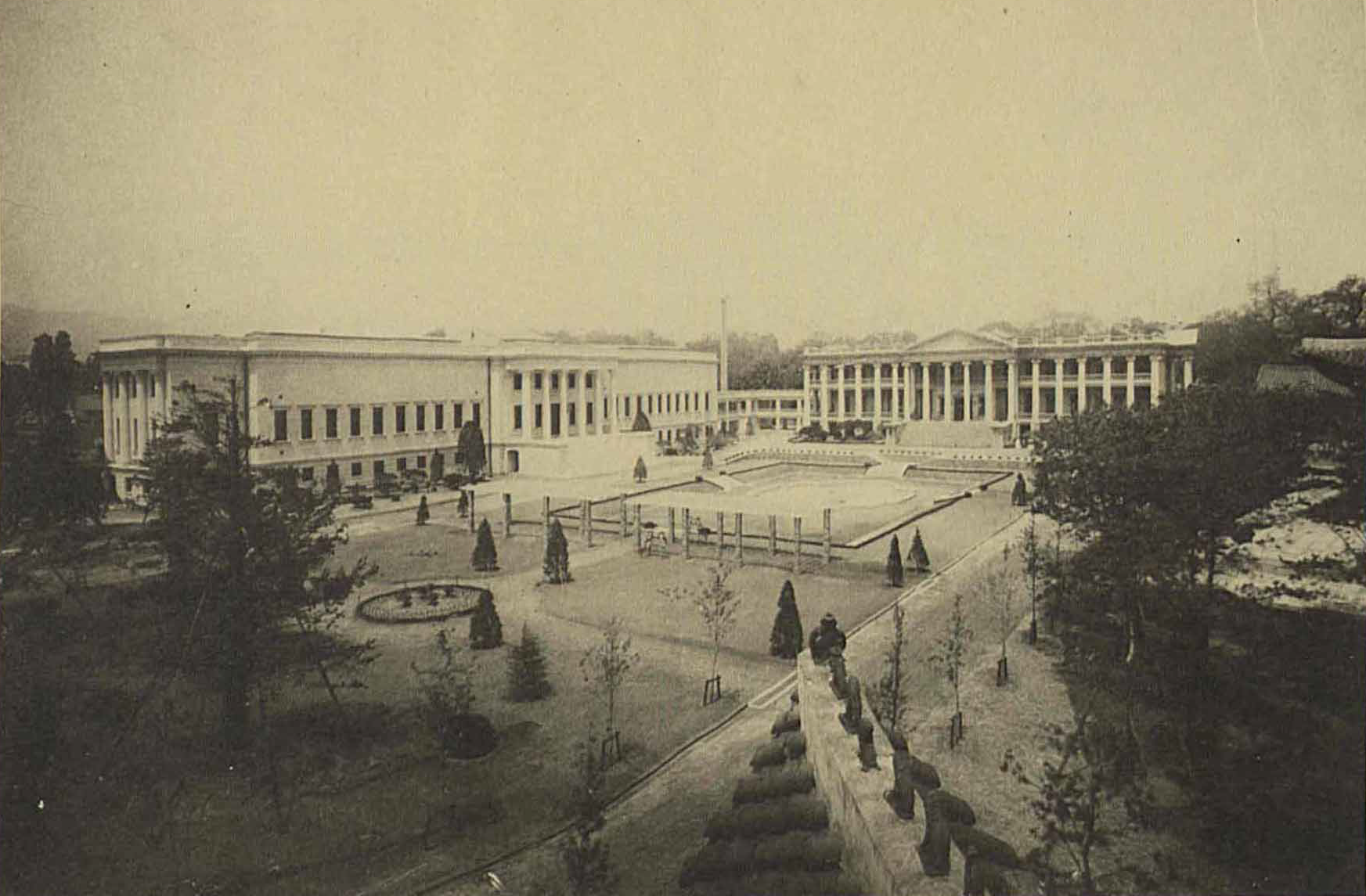
Seokjojeon and its newly-constructed West Wing as the Yi Royal Family Art Museum (1938)

In May 1931, the Office of the Yi Dynasty announced that 10,000 pyeong (33,000 m^{2}) of Deoksugung would be turned into a public park called "Central Park" (중앙공원; 中央公園). After around a year of construction work, it was opened to the public on October 1, 1933. Ten buildings were removed from the palace. The remaining former guest houses that were separated from the palace during Taepyeongno's expansion were demolished in 1933. Plans were created for a swimming pool in place of Dondeokjeon, which could be used as a skating rink during the winter. The plan was deemed too offensive to the legacy of the palace, and was scrapped. Alterations to the palace during this process were among the most significant in the palace's history. A water feature was moved from another palace Changdeokgung to the garden in front of Seokjojeon. The gardens of the palace were significantly renovated; only a few trees and decorative elements have persisted until the present. Numerous peonies were planted in the park. These became a popular attraction during the colonial period and even after the liberation. They were replaced in 1985 with pine trees and azaleas after it was determined they were a product of the colonial period.

In 1933, Seokjojeon was converted into the Seokjojeon Art Museum. From 1936 to 1938, a three-story West Wing building for Seokjojeon was constructed. Together, these buildings became the Yi Royal Family Art Museum.

After the aforementioned projects, just eight of the original buildings were left.

=== Post-liberation ===
Soon after the 1945 liberation of Korea, the Yi Royal Family Art Museum renamed itself to the Deoksugung Art Museum. In March 1946, the United States Army Military Government in Korea seized Seokjojeon and designated it as the offices of the Soviet-American Joint Commission. They held a major meeting there on the issue of Korean reunification on March 20, 1946. The returning Korean Provisional Government used the building for a number of its meetings. The joint commission was dissolved in October 1947.

During the 1950–1953 Korean War, the palace was largely spared from war damage, although Seokjojeon's interior was destroyed by fire. During the Second Battle of Seoul, North Korean soldiers amassed in the palace. U.S. lieutenant James Hamilton Dill persuaded his superiors not to shell the palace because of the palace's cultural heritage. In 1996, after this story came to the attention of the South Korean government, he was awarded a plaque of gratitude.

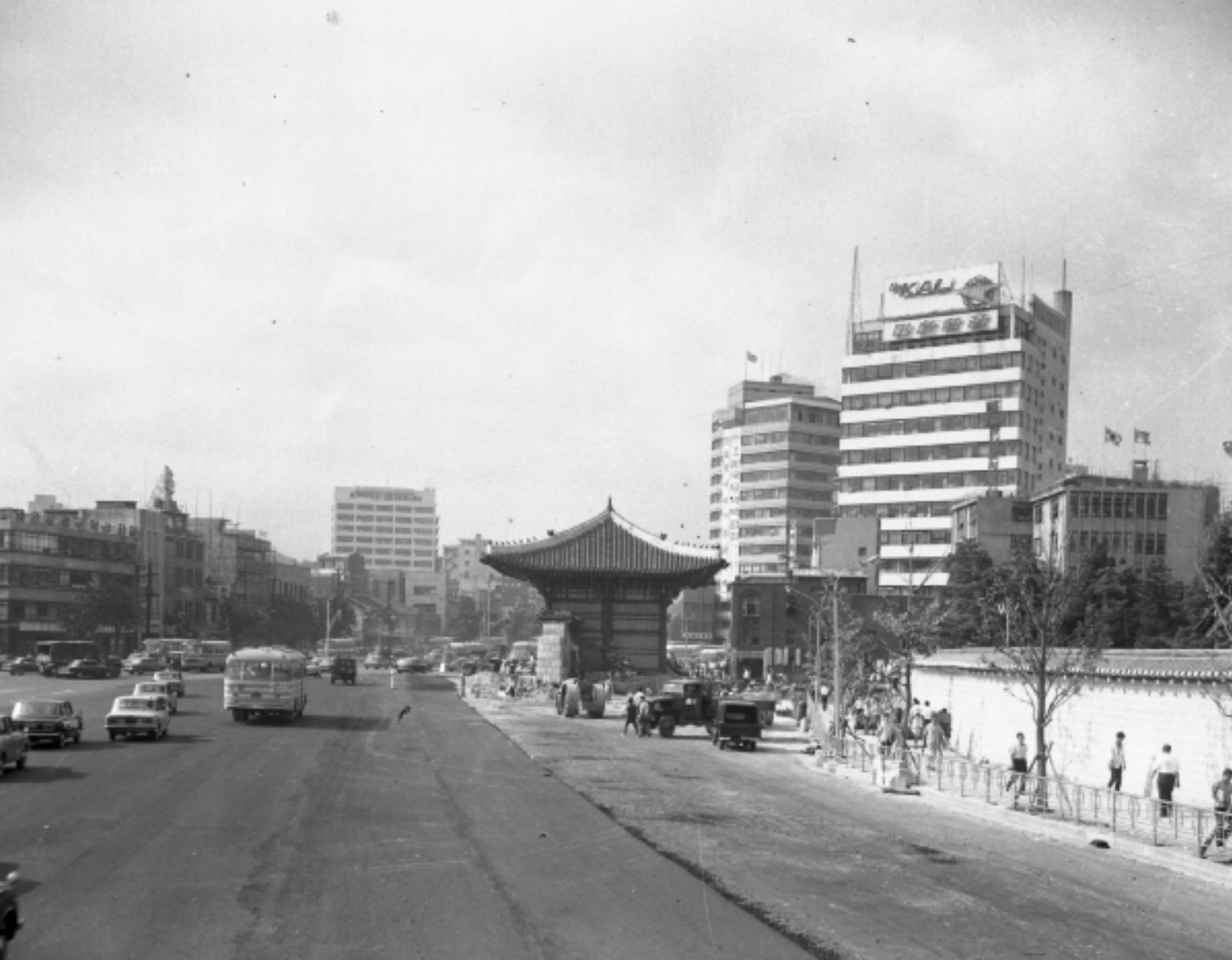
Daehanmun, sticking out from the rest of the wall (1968)

In 1961, a project to expand the nearby road Taepyeongno affected the palace. The palace walls were torn down and replaced with a see-through fence. In 1968, the walls were further pushed back during another road expansion program. Daehanmun was initially not pushed back along with the wall, and stuck out into the road. From August 1970 to January 1971, the gate was moved west into the wall, to its current location.

Beginning in the 1980s, efforts began to be made to restore the palace to its pre-colonial state. In 2004, a plan for this, entitled the Deoksugung Restoration and Maintenance Basic Plan (덕수궁 복원정비기본계획), was drafted. As part of these efforts, Jungmyeongjeon was restored in 2009, Seokjojeon was restored in 2014, and Gwangmyeongmun was moved back to its original location in 2018.

An Chang-mo argues that the current Deoksugung is around a third the size of its peak size.

== Current landmarks ==
=== East section ===
==== Daehanmun ====
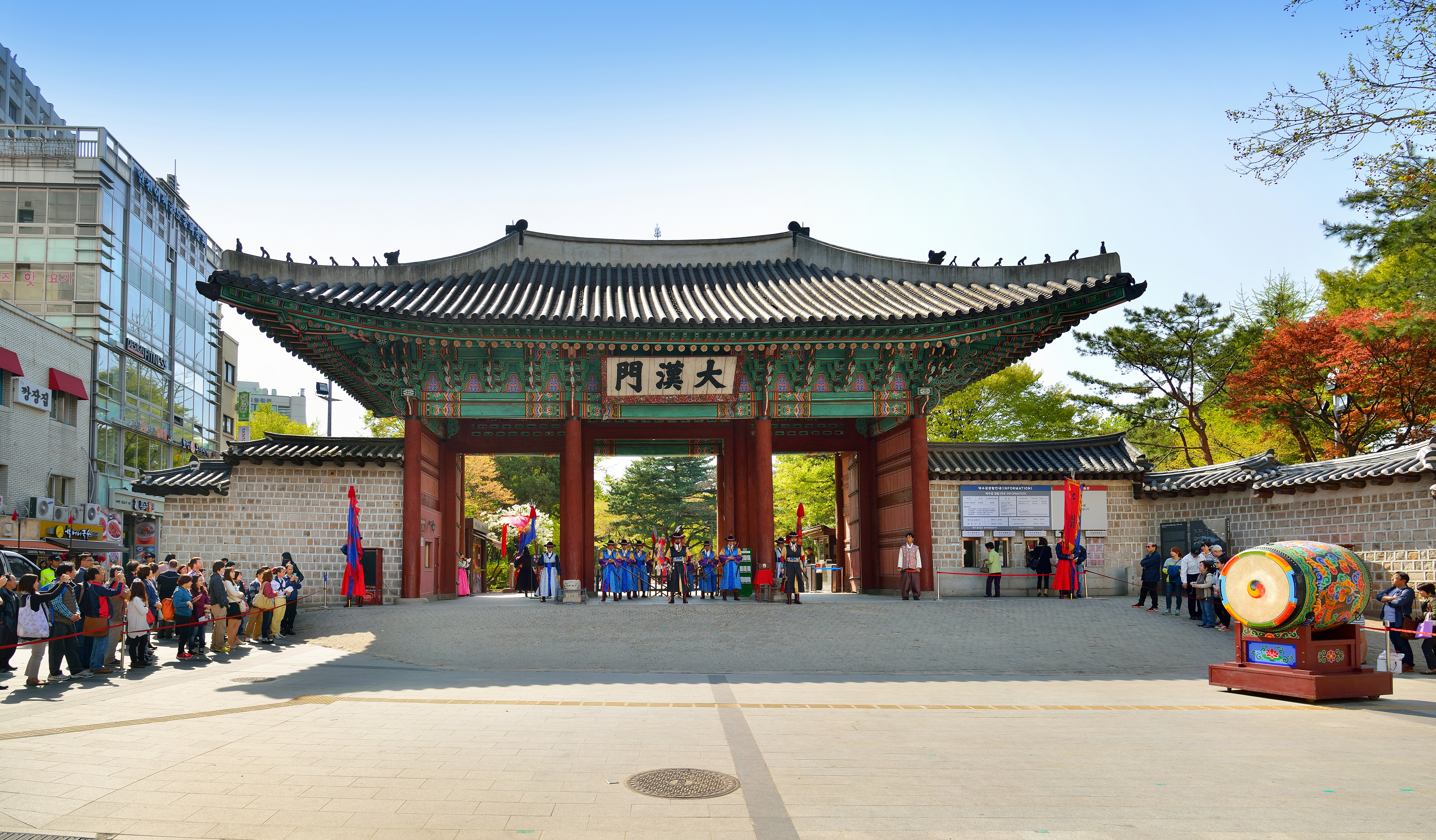
Daehanmun (2013)

Daehanmun (대한문; 大漢門; Taehanmun) is the current main gate of the palace and is located on the east side of the complex. It was originally called Daeanmun (대안문; 大安門; Taeanmun). It was completed in 1898. The original main gate was Inhwamun, but that gate declined in use and status compared to Daeanmun. In 1900, Daeanmun was made the official main gate. The gate was destroyed in the 1904 fire and rebuilt in 1906. On April 25, 1906, it was renamed to Daehanmun and made the main gate. Its new name board was written by Nam Chŏngch'ŏl. The gate was moved inwards towards the palace in 1914 during a road expansion project. It was moved again in 1970 to its final location. It is decorated with dancheong decorative coloring and statues of various beasts.

==== Gwangmyeongmun ====
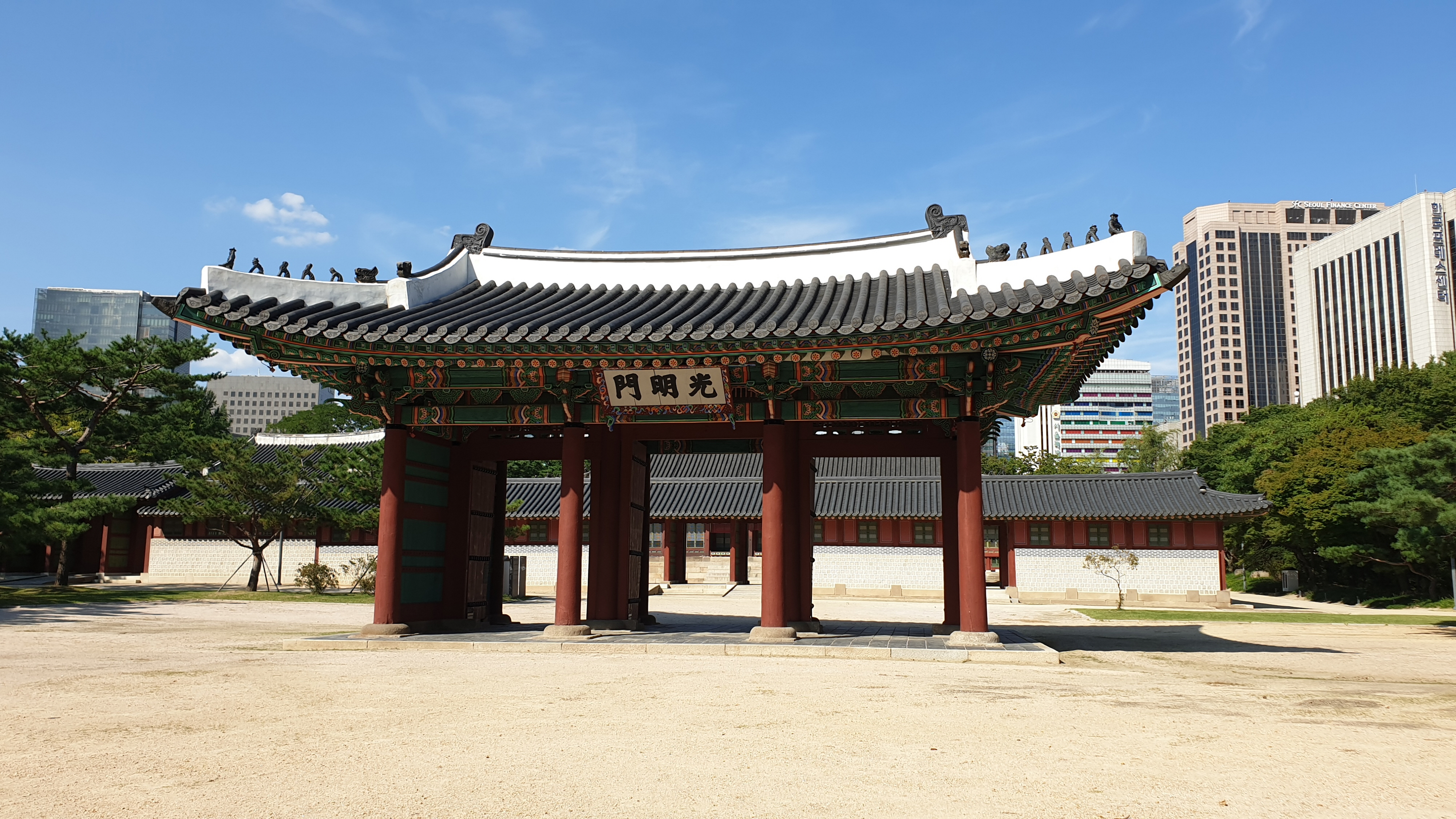
Gwangmyeongmun (2020)

Gwangmyeongmun (광명문; 光明門; Kwangmyŏngmun) is the main gate to the south of the king's sleeping quarters Hamnyeongjeon. It was completed in 1897 and destroyed by the 1904 fire. It was reconstructed later that same year. It was moved in 1938, upon the expansion of Seokjojeon and the establishment of the Yi Royal Family Art Museum. It was used as an exhibition hall for national treasures such as the water clock Borugak Jagyeongnu and Heungcheonsa bronze bell. It was moved back to its original location at the end of 2018 in anticipation of the 100th anniversary of the 1919 March First Movement.

==== Hamnyeongjeon ====
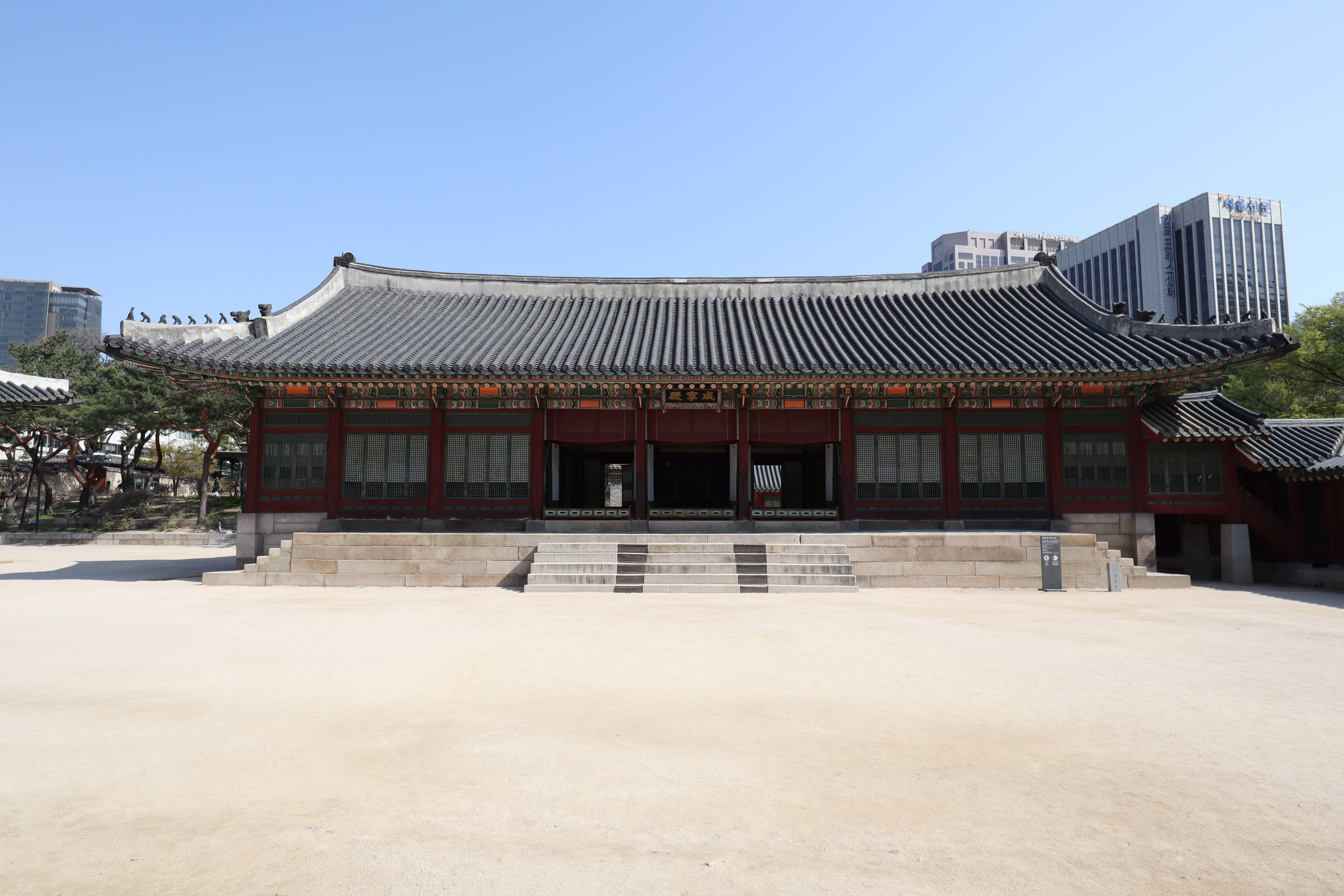
Hamnyeongjeon (2024)

Hamnyeongjeon (함녕전; 咸寧殿; Hamnyŏngjŏn) is a building that was used as Gojong's sleeping quarters. The building was originally completed in 1897 but was destroyed in the 1904 fire. It was the ondol system of this building that caused the 1904 great fire. It was rebuilt by December that year, with the new building in an L-shape instead of the original rectangular form. Gojong died in this building on January 22, 1919. The building was used as Gojong's funeral home and his spirit tablet was kept here. The building's layout and style is typical with other Korean palaces. There are windows on all sides of the building. It has an ondol traditional floor heating system.

==== Deokhongjeon ====
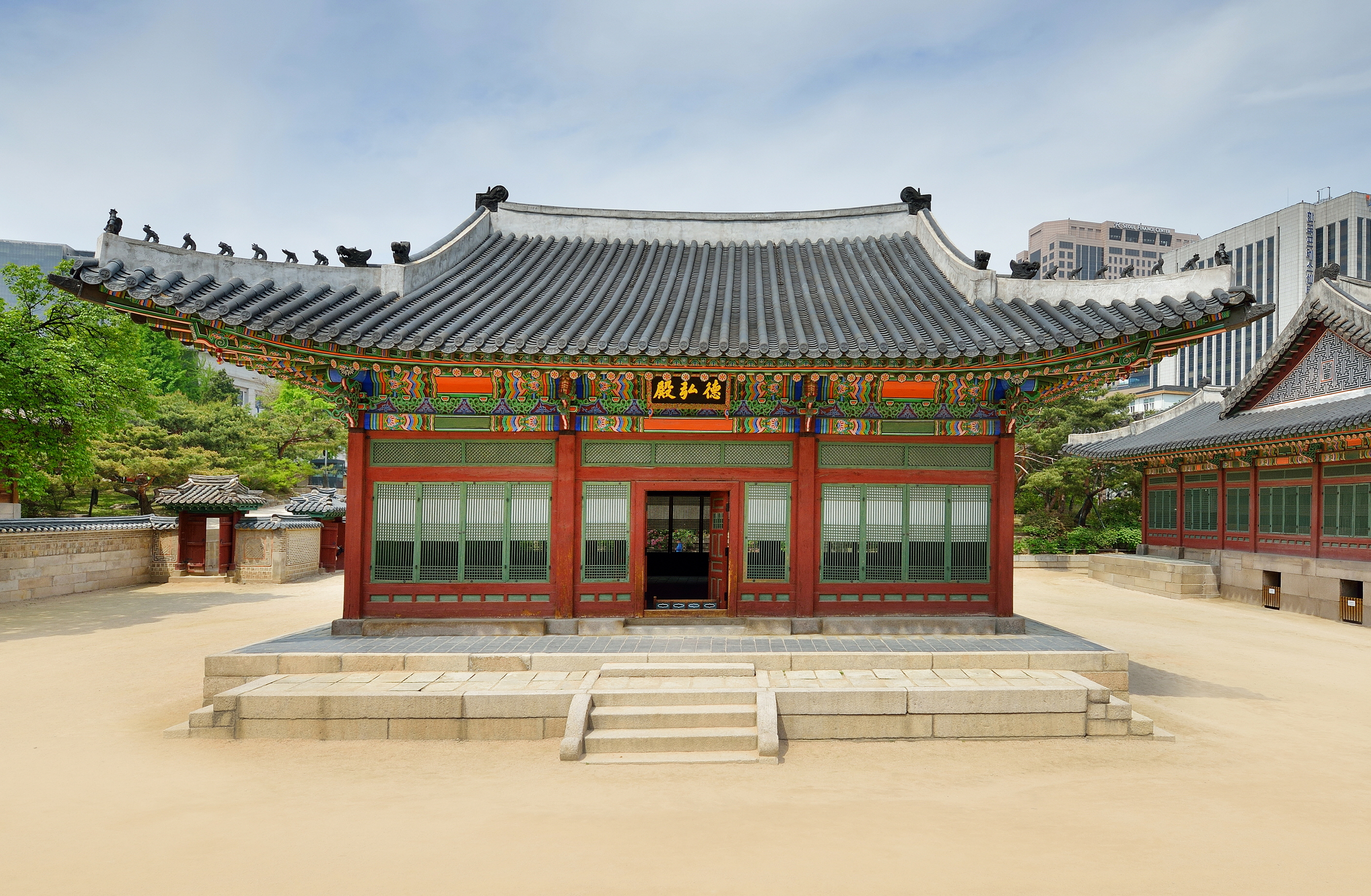
Deokhongjeon (2013)

Deokhongjeon (덕홍전; 德弘殿; Tŏkhongjŏn) is a hall next to and just west of Hamnyeongjeon. A different building on this spot was originally called Gyeongsojeon (경소전; 景昭殿; Kyŏngsojŏn). After Empress Myeongseong's death, the hall was renamed Gyeonghyojeon (경효전; 景孝殿; Kyŏnghyojŏn) and began to be used as her honjŏn (혼전; 魂殿), or ancestral spirit hall. The building was destroyed in the 1904 fire. The empress's spirit tablet was moved elsewhere thereafter and did not return even after another building was rebuilt on this spot in 1912. That building was called Deokhongjeon, and used as an audience hall for Gojong.

==== Jeonggwanheon ====
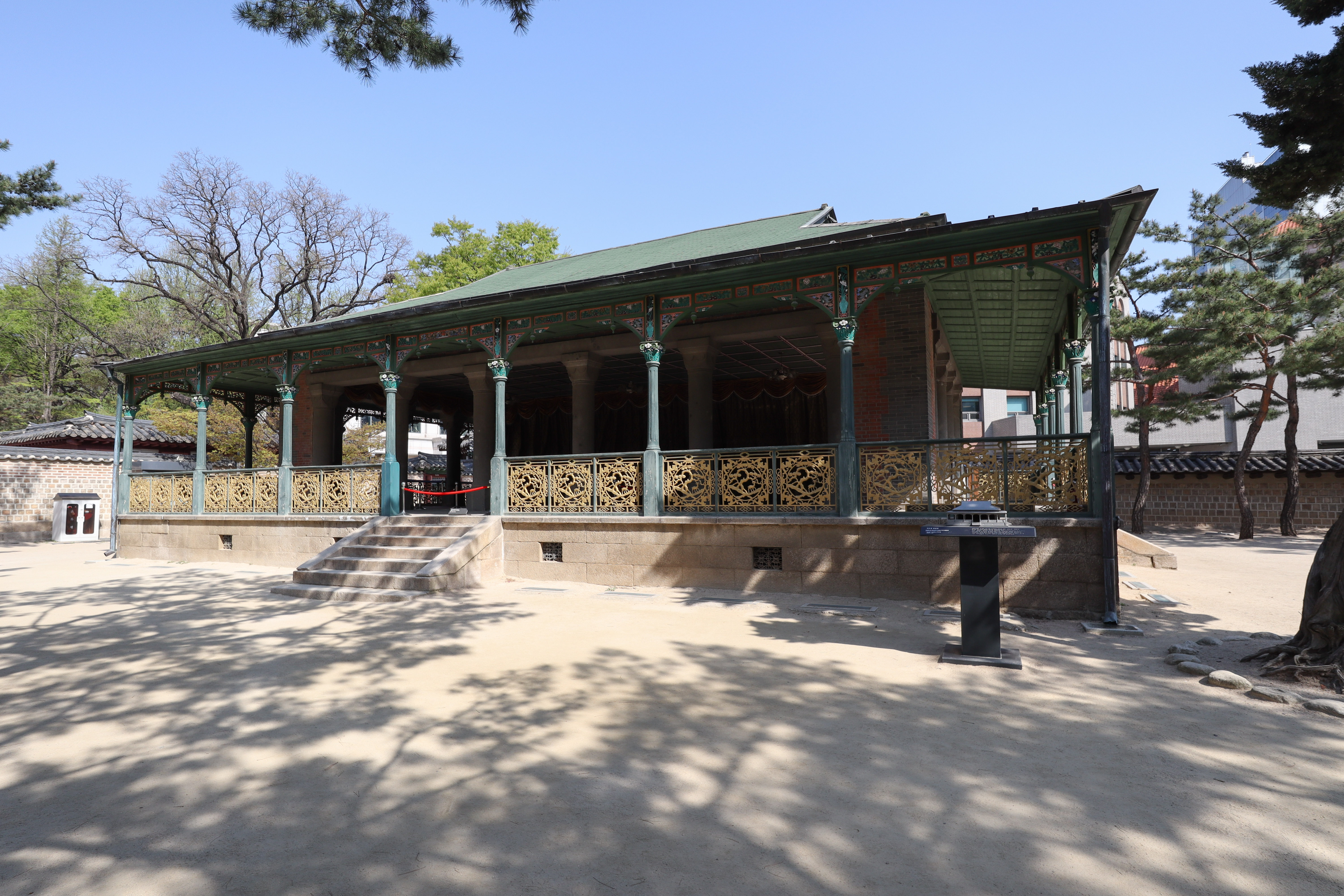
Jeonggwanheon (2024)

Jeonggwanheon (정관헌; 靜觀軒; Chŏnggwanhŏn) is an American-style brick building with a wooden porch. It has Romanesque columns on the veranda and Korean-style elements in its roof. It was built before February 1901 and was unaffected by the 1904 fire. The building was used for a variety of purposes that possibly changed over time, including enshrining the portrait of King Taejo, a space for drawing royal portraits, and serving food during banquets. The building was modified over time, but specific records of how and when it was modified on some occasions have been lost. In the 1930s, its floor was changed from wood to concrete, its interior walls were removed to make it a single room, and its roof was changed to a Japanese-style architecture. In the 1960s, glass doors were installed in it and it was used as a cafe.

=== Center section ===
==== Junghwamun ====
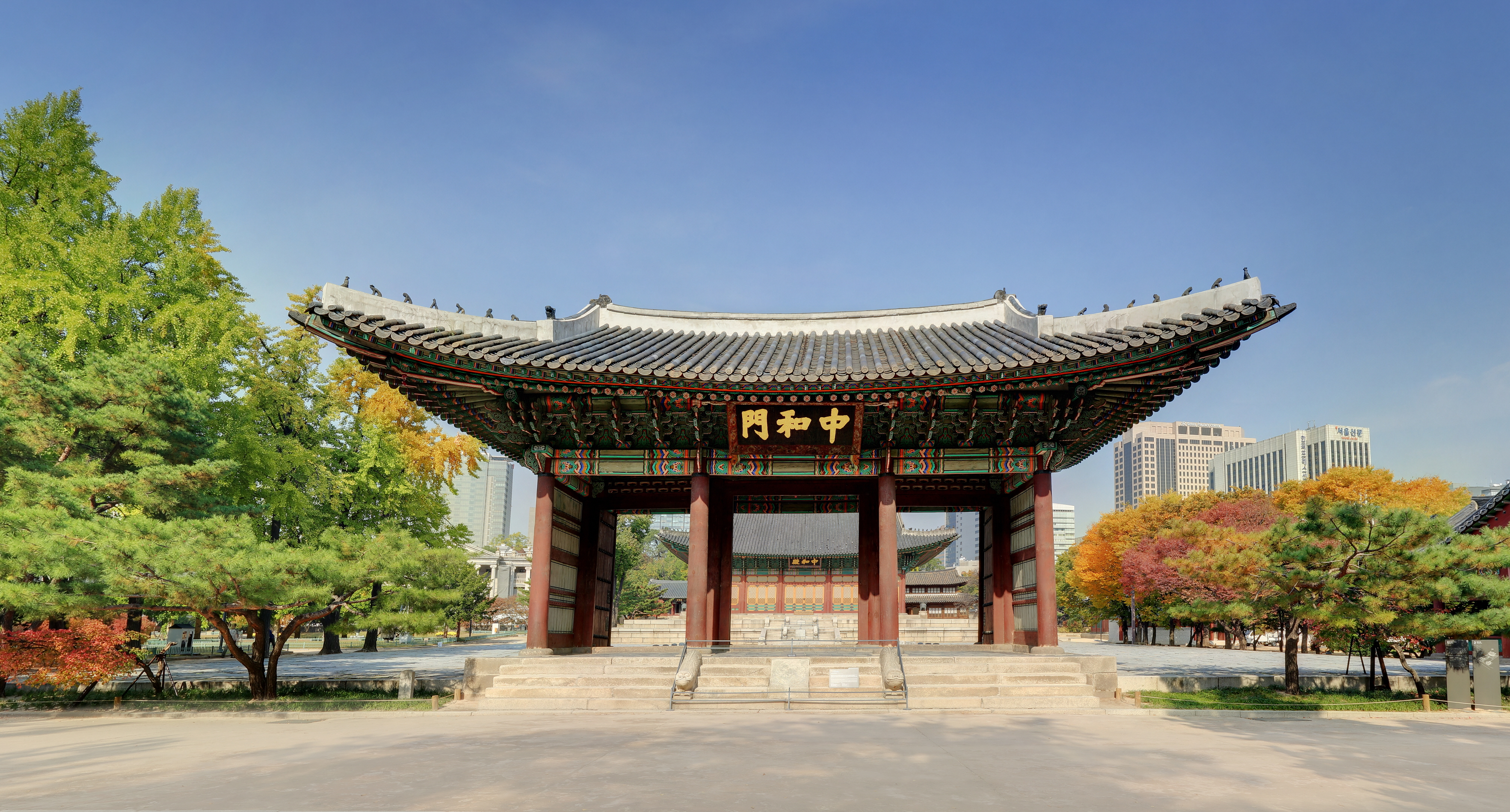
Junghwamun (2012)

Junghwamun (중화문; 中和門; Chunghwamun) is a gate to the front of Junghwajeon. It is built in a similar style to Junghwajeon. Like its counterpart, it was destroyed in the 1904 fire and rebuilt at a smaller scale. It has three large sets of doors and is built on a stone podium. In front of it is a staircase divided into three sections, with stone beast statues in between the east section.

==== Junghwajeon ====
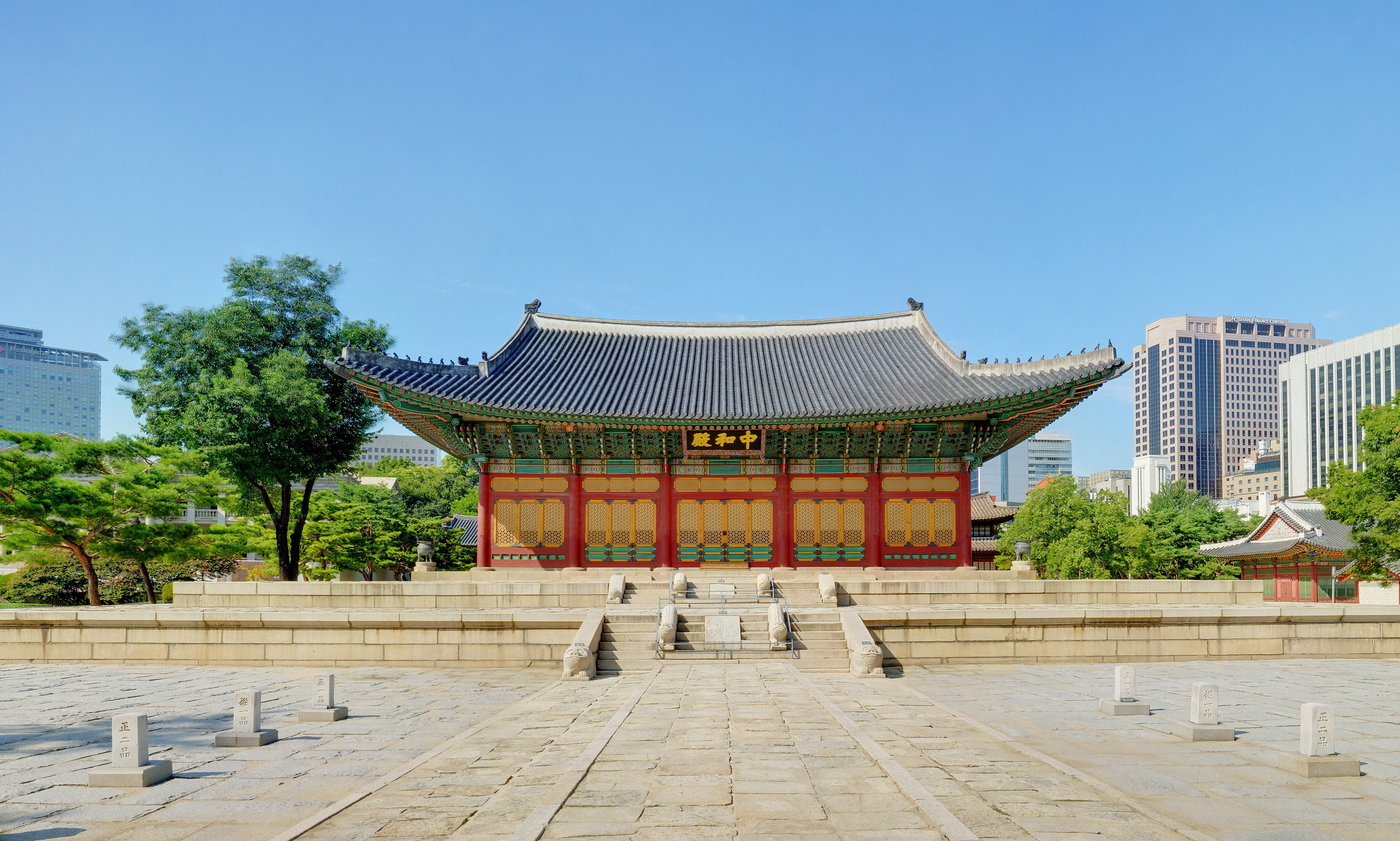
Junghwajeon (2013)

Junghwajeon (중화전; 中和殿; Chunghwajŏn) is the main building of the palace. It was originally a two-story building completed in 1902. Construction on the building began relatively late compared to other structures in the palace. Gojong completed other portions of the palace first and purchased more land south of the palace before ordering its construction in 1901. It was destroyed in the 1904 fire, and rebuilt as a one-story building that has remained to the present. The exterior is decorated with dancheong decorative coloring. The ceiling has two dragon statues that symbolize the emperor. It is visible from around the sides of its front gate Junghwamun; this was not its original appearance. A peristyle built to surround its front courtyard, this was largely demolished during the colonial period.

==== Seogeodang ====
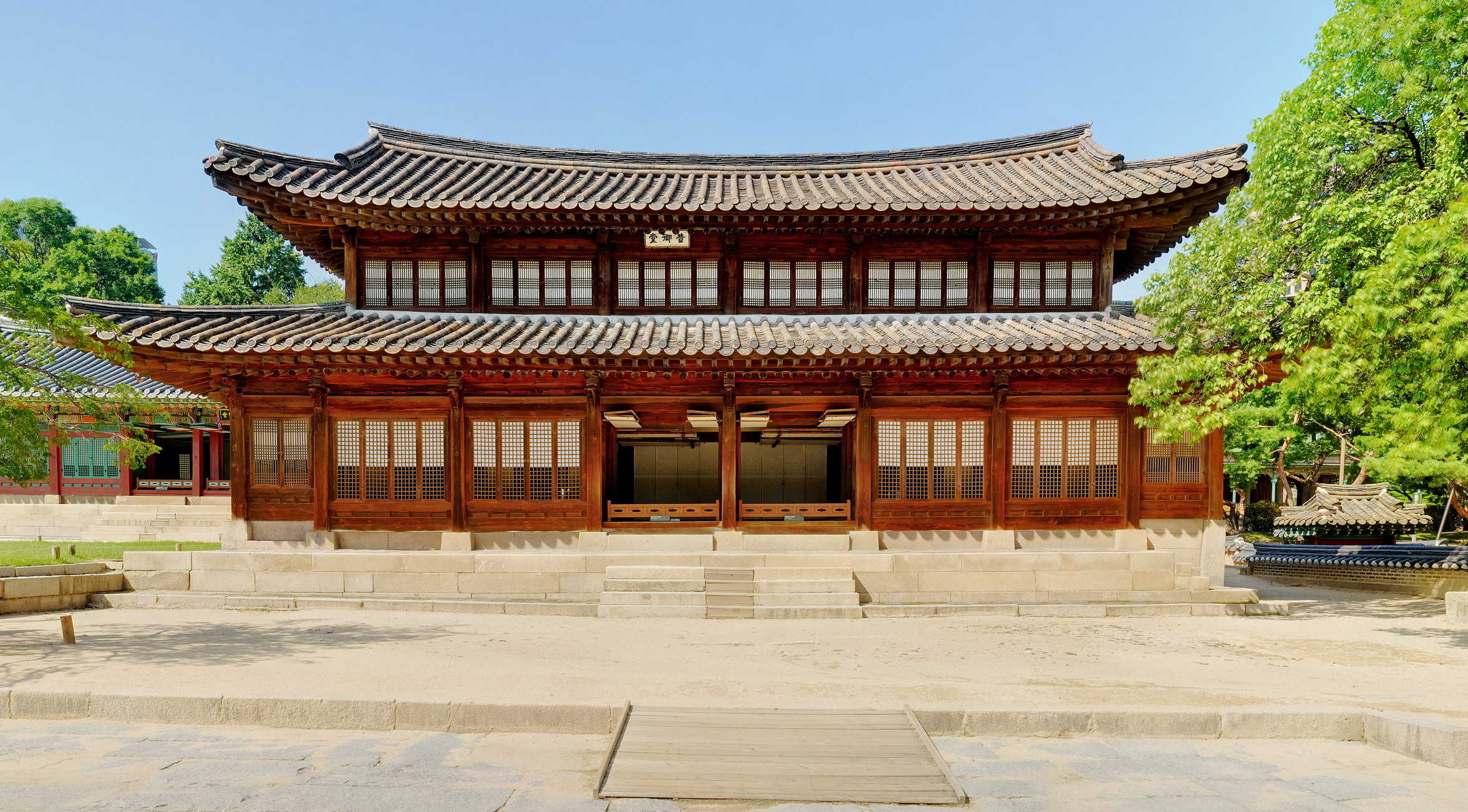
Seogeodang (2013)

Seogeodang (석어당; 昔御堂; Sŏgŏdang; 'former ruler's house') is a building that dated to Seonjo's time (before it was destroyed in the 1904 fire and rebuilt that same year). Queen Inmok was confined in this building in the 17th century. It is one of the few surviving two-story buildings in the palace. The stairs to the second floor are located in the west-most room. The upper floor is a single room. The lower floor has a signboard with calligraphy by Gojong.

==== Junmyeongdang and Jeukjodang ====
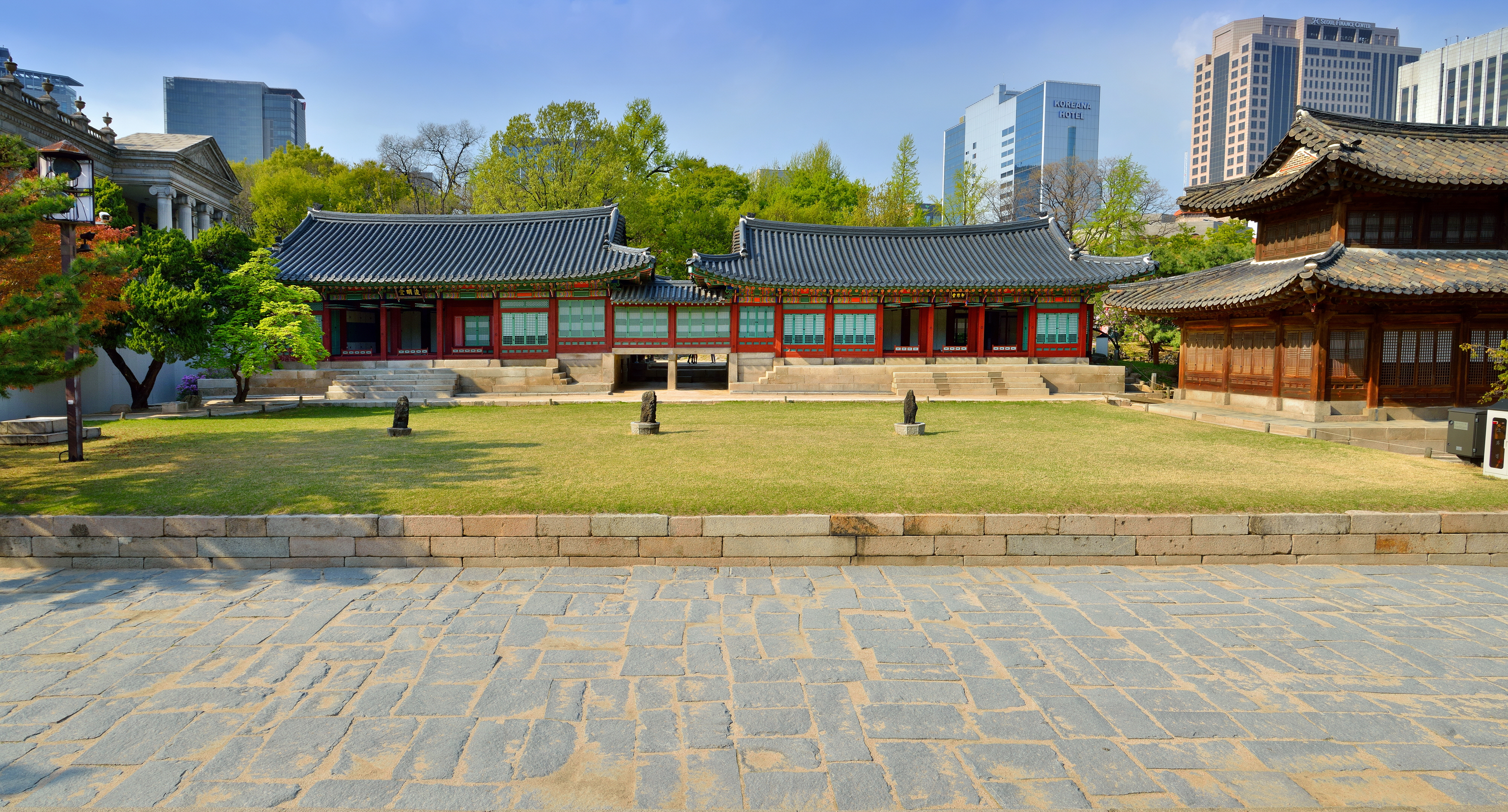
The connected buildings Junmyeongdang (left) and Jeukjodang (right)

Junmyeongdang (준명당; 浚眀堂; Chunmyŏngdang; 'to govern clearly and brightly') is a building that was used to receive foreign envoys. It was originally completed in 1897 but was destroyed in the 1904 fire. It was then rebuilt. In 1916, the building was used as a kindergarten for the last Korean princess Deokhye. The building is now in an L shape. It is equipped with an ondol underfloor heating system.

Jeukjodang (즉조당; 卽阼堂; Chŭkchodang) is a building that is adjacent to and connected with Junmyeongdang. It dated to Seonjo's time, before it was destroyed in the 1904 fire and rebuilt at smaller scale. When Gojong first moved into Deoksugung, he used Jeukjodang as the main hall. He dubbed it Taegeukjeon (태극전; 太極殿; T'aegŭkchŏn) and then Junghwajeon (same name as the later main building). After the construction of the larger main building, that building went by Junghwajeon and this building returned to using the name Jeukjodang.

=== West section ===
==== Seokjojeon and West Wing ====
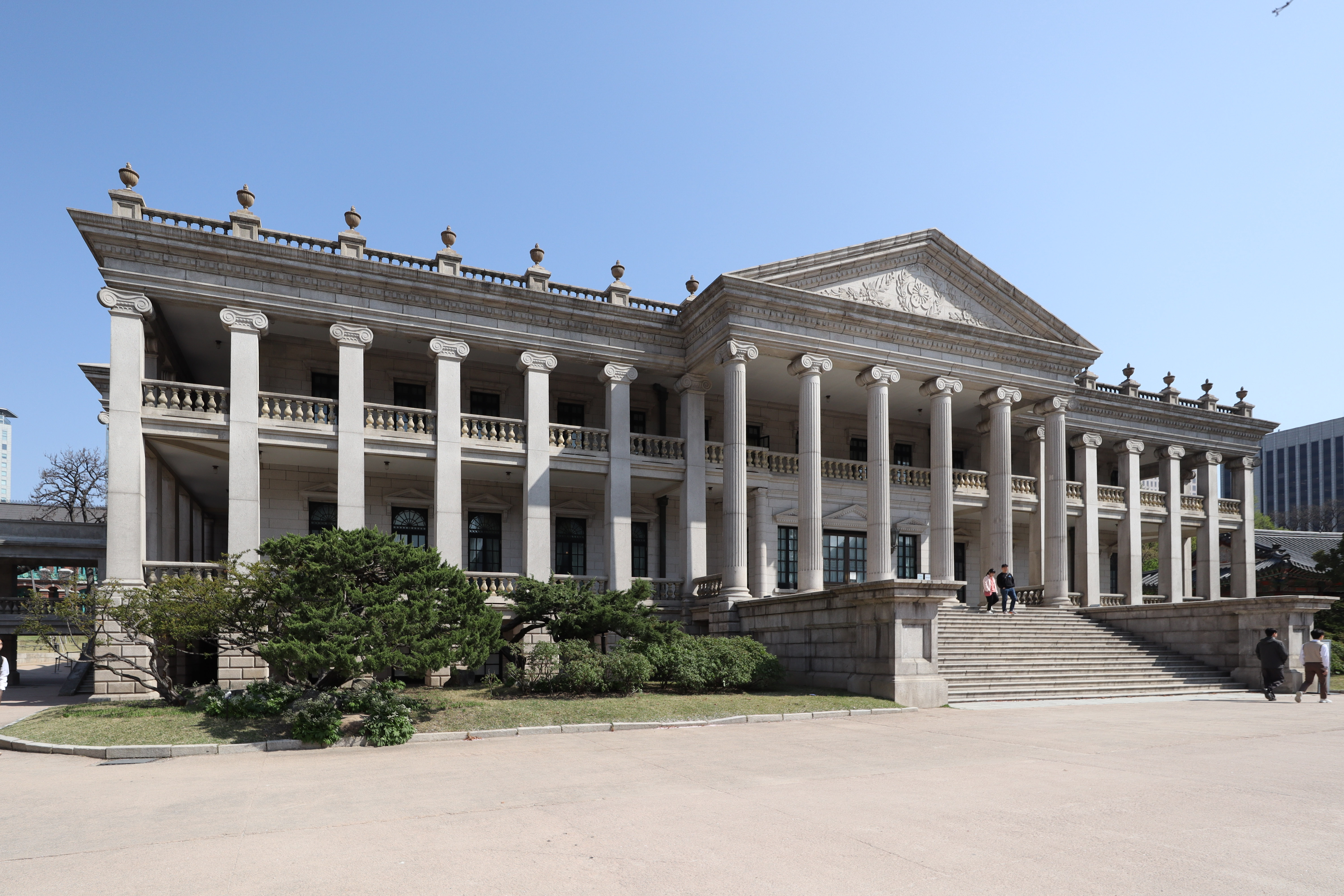
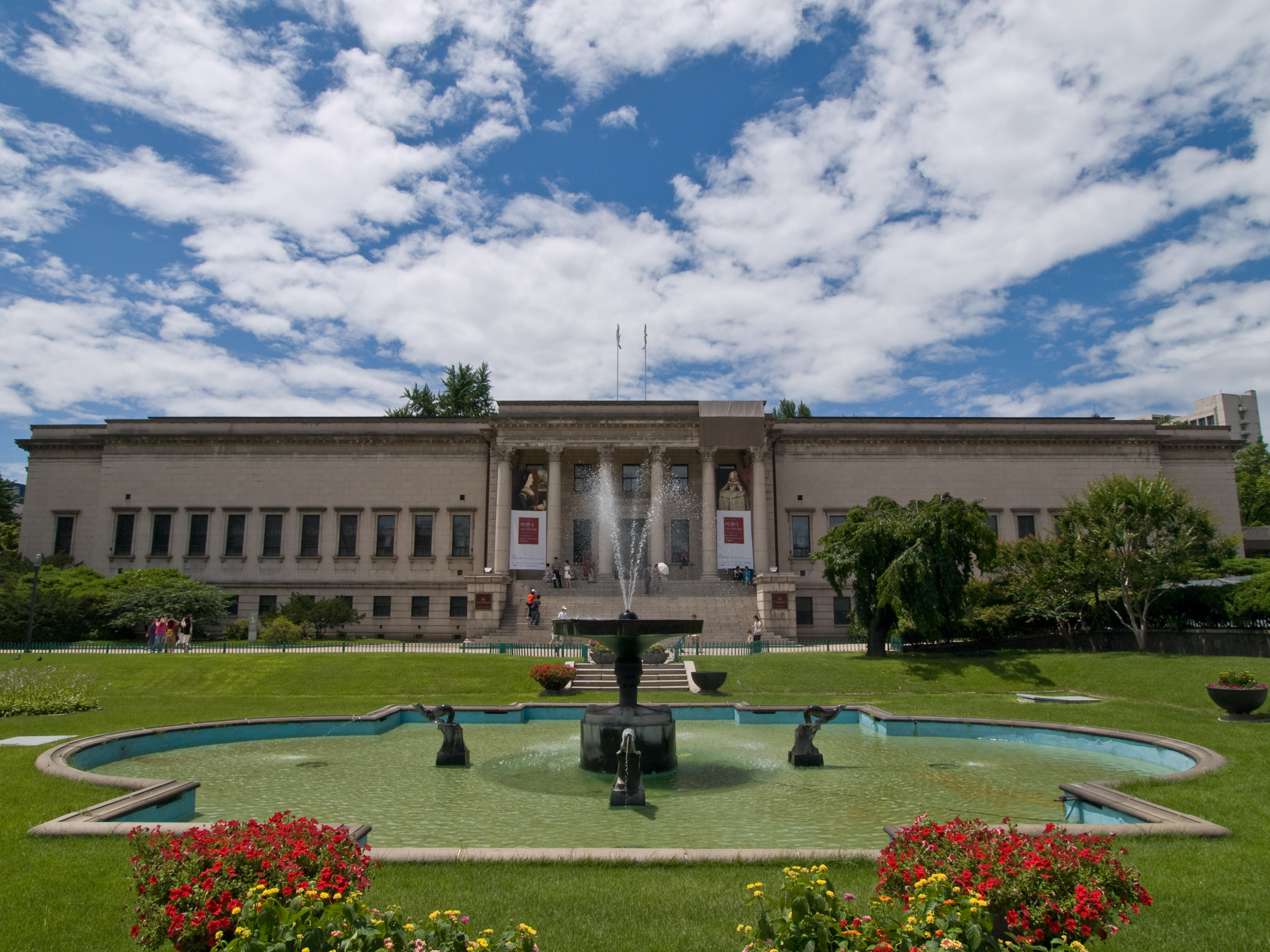
Seokjojeon main building (top) and West Wing (bottom)

Seokjojeon (석조전; 石造殿; Sŏkchojŏn) is a neoclassical palace building that was completed in 1910. It was designed and furnished by British people. Just months after its completion, Korea was formally annexed by Japan. It continued to be used by the Korean royal family until Gojong's death in 1919. Afterwards it was used by Japanese dignitaries for a variety of purposes and its interior was altered. It was used as an art museum beginning in 1933. In 1938, a West Wing building was constructed for it. Together, these two buildings were used for the Yi Royal Family Art Museum.

After the 1945 liberation of Korea, the buildings were largely used as museums. In 1998, the West Wing became part of the National Museum of Modern and Contemporary Art, Deoksugung branch. Beginning in the late 2000s, the main building began to be converted into a history museum. Efforts were made to restore the pre-colonial interior as accurately as possible. The Daehan Empire History Museum opened in 2014.

The garden in front of both these buildings was first completed in March 1913.

==== Dondeokjeon ====
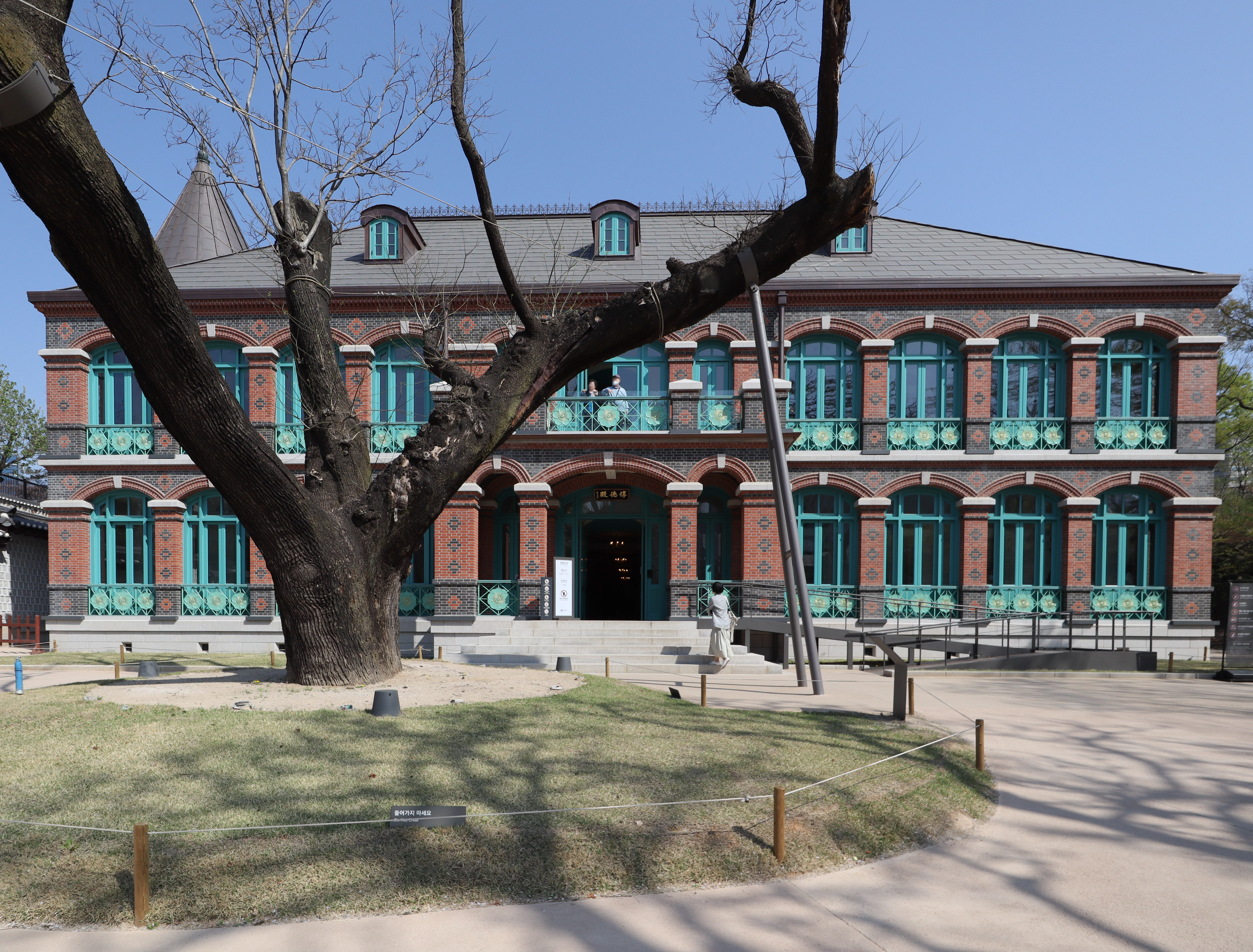
Dondeokjeon (2024)

Dondeokjeon (돈덕전; 惇德殿; Tondŏkchŏn) was a French-style building constructed between 1902 and 1903. A customs office used to occupy its spot. It was used as a guest house and audience hall for dignitaries. It did not burn down during the 1904 fire. Gojong used this hall frequently to receive guests and Sunjong ascended to the throne here. It was demolished sometime between 1921 and 1926. A children's amusement park was built in its place. Efforts began to reconstruct the building in the late 2010s. As the interior was poorly documented, rather than attempting to recreate the interior decorations (as they did with Seokjojeon), they made it into a museum. It was opened to the public on September 26, 2023.

=== Outside current palace proper ===
==== Jungmyeongjeon ====
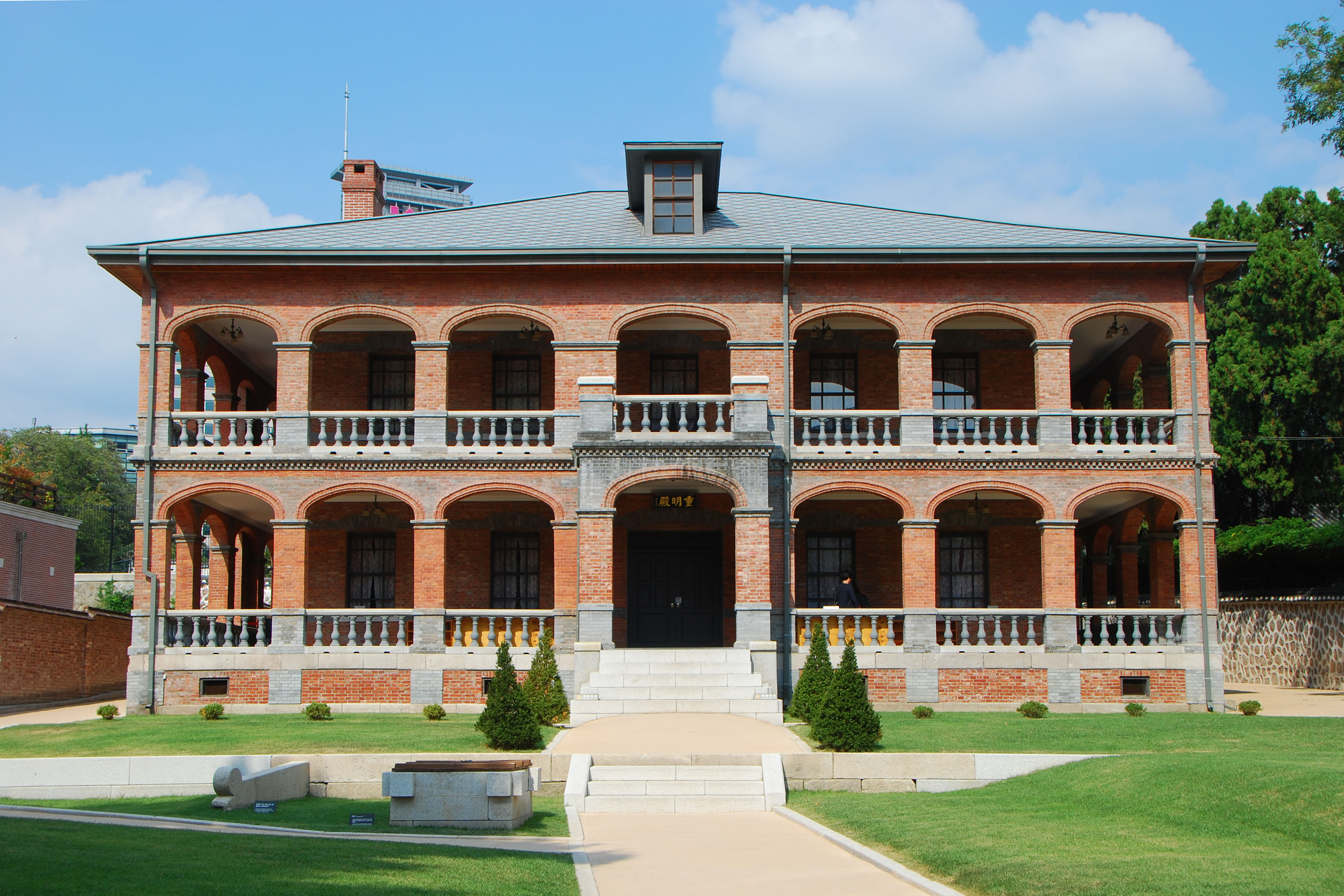
Jungmyeongjeon (2017)

Jungmyeongjeon (중명전; 重眀殿; Chungmyŏngjŏn; 'Pavilion of eternal light') is the first Western-style building in the palace; it was completed before 1897 under the name Suokheon (수옥헌; 漱玉軒; Suokhŏn) and was originally a single-story building that possibly previously belonged to foreigners. It was originally an imperial library. The building was destroyed in a November 16, 1901, fire and rebuilt; the rebuilt form has two stories. After the 1904 fire, it was temporarily used as Gojong's office. Around this time, he changed the name of the building to Jungmyeonjeon. In 1905, the infamous Eulsa Treaty was signed here. In 1906, the wedding between Emperor Sunjong and Empress Sunjeonghyo took place at this building. The building was once directly part of the palace complex but eventually became separate amidst a reduction in the palace's size during the colonial period. Afterward, it was leased out to and used by a number of different entities. In 1925, a fire severely damaged its interior. It was eventually purchased by the Cultural Heritage Administration. In February 2007, it began to be managed as a part of Deoksugung.

==== Yangijae ====
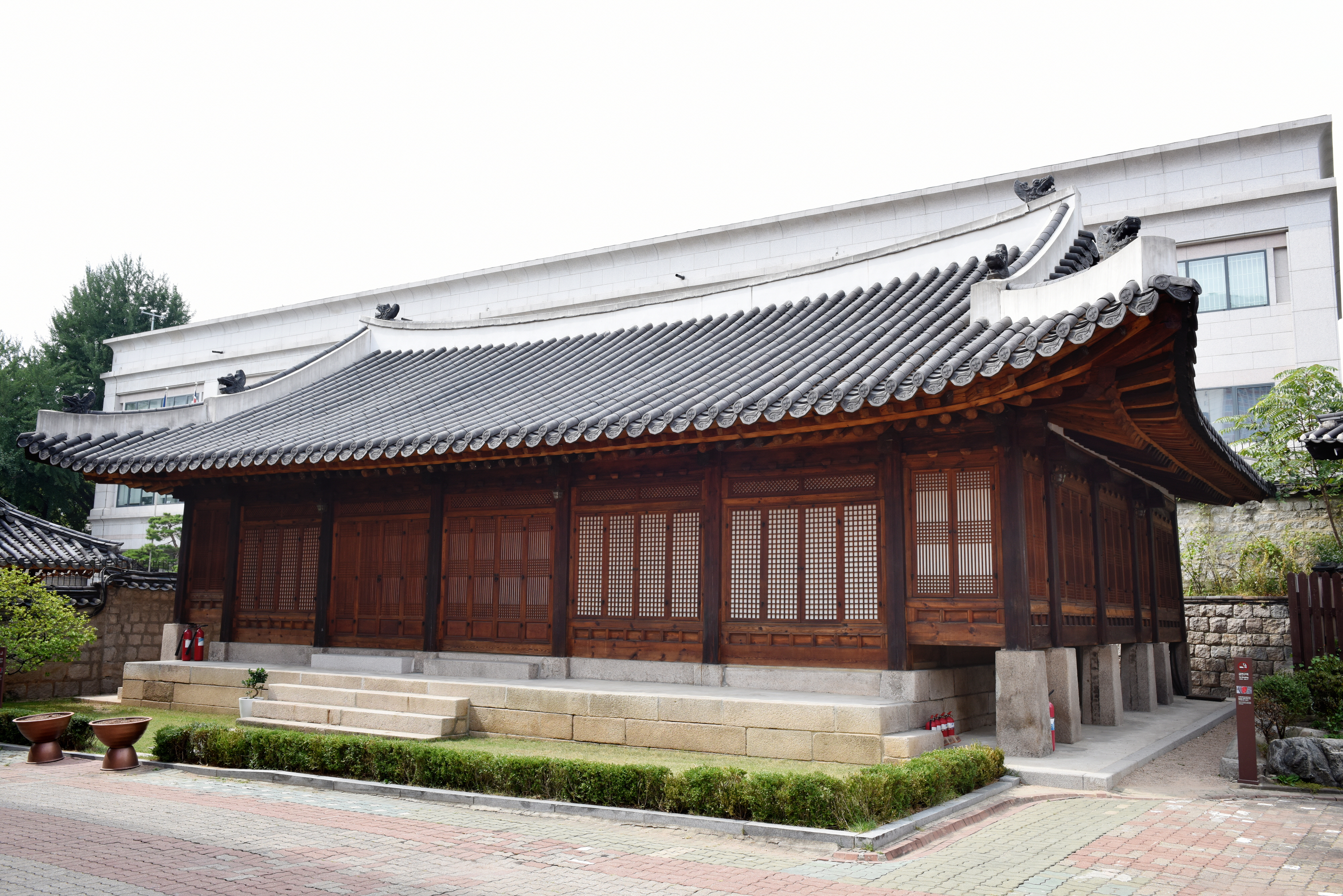
Yangijae (2015)

Next to what is now the Embassy of the United Kingdom used to be two buildings that were part of the palace complex. The building Yangijae (양이재; 養怡齋) still exists, although Hamhuidang (함희당; 咸喜堂; Hamhŭidang) was demolished. They were originally completed in February 1905 and meant to be used for educating the families of the elite. They ceased to be used for this purpose in October 1910, after the Japanese annexation. In 1912, the Government-General of Chōsen asked that the royal family lease these buildings to the Seoul Anglican Cathedral. The buildings were purchased by the church outright in 1920. Both buildings were moved in 1927, with Yangijae moving to its current spot, and Hamhuidang was demolished in 1960.

== Former landmarks ==
Seonwonjeon (선원전; 璿源殿; Sŏnwŏnjŏn) was an ancestral worship hall that was located in what is now outside and north of the palace. It was first completed in 1900 on the east side of the palace but was destroyed by fire on October 14 of that year. It was then rebuilt to the northwest side, and was completed on July 11, 1901. After Gojong's death in 1919, the building and its land were sold off to the public. The building was demolished by 1925 and its ancestor worship materials were moved to Changdeokgung. Afterward, a variety of buildings and clients occupied its former site. Eventually, the residence of the chief of the Chōsen Savings Bank came to occupy the spot. That building continued to exist by 2024. Between 2002 and 2005, the United States Embassy planned to build a 15-story office building and 8-story apartment on the land, but this plan was thwarted by citizen protestors who thought the buildings potential eyesores and wanted to preserve the history of the plot. In 2024, it was opened as a public park.

The headquarters for the Board of Marshals was located in two buildings to the right of Inhwamun (the original main gate in the south). They had entrances both in and out of the palace. At least one of them was made of brick and was two stories tall. Photos of the buildings are sparse, so little is known of their appearance otherwise.

There were three brick three-story watchtowers along the palace walls that looked to be built in Western style.

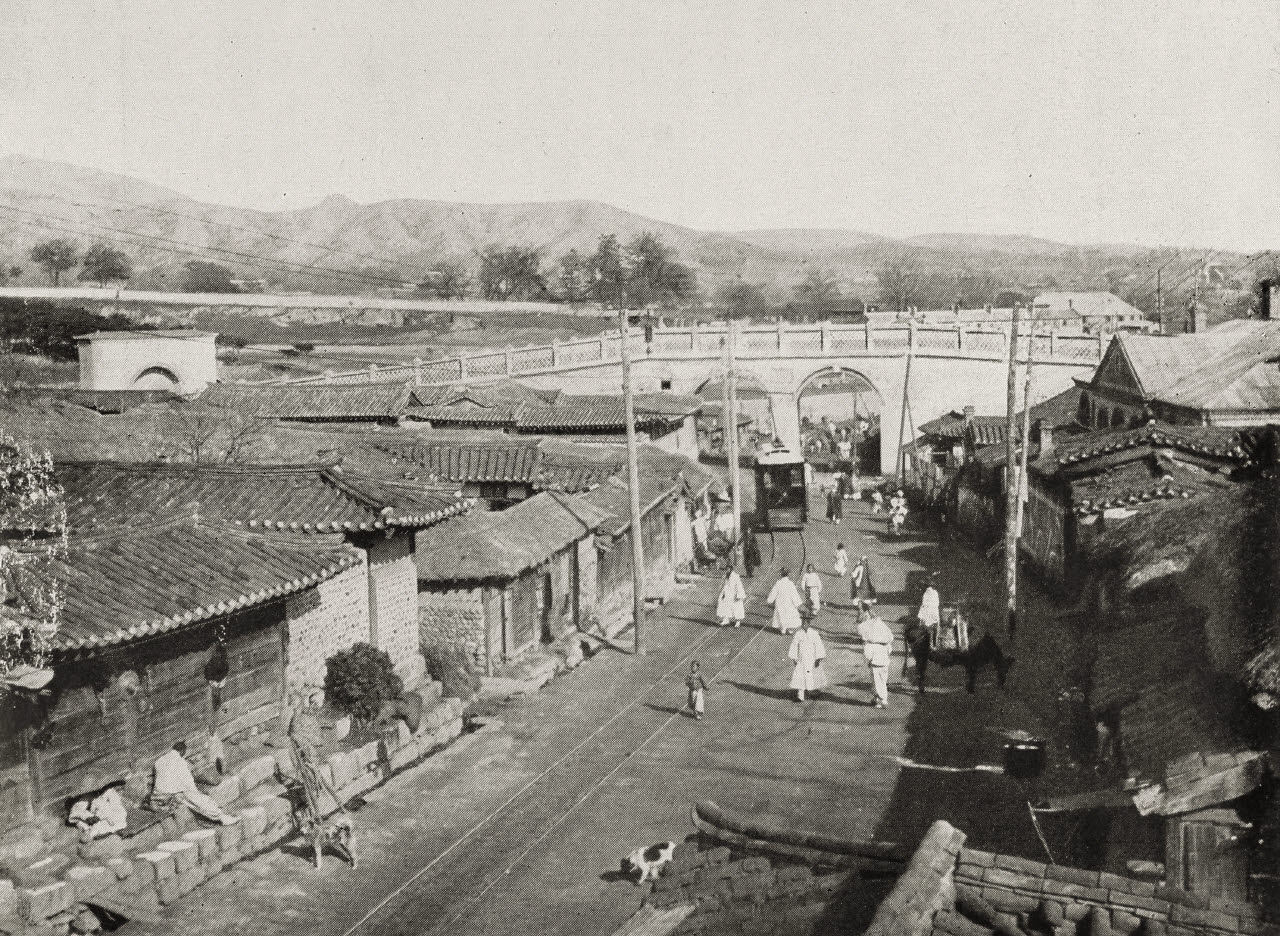
The overpass bridge leading to Gyeonghuigung. Photo taken presumably just after the bridge's completion (late 1902 to mid 1903).

There were two overpass bridges (운교; 雲橋; un'gyo) at the palace. One connected the palace to the former German legation (some portion of that legation's land was purchased by the Korean government) and another led to another palace Gyeonghuigung. The bridge to the legation had a single arch; traces of its structure still remain on the walls of Deoksugung and on a Seoul City Hall annex building.

Inhwamun (인화문; 仁化門) was the original main gate of the palace and was located to its south. However, it led to a narrow and poor-quality road. It declined in use and status compared to Daeanmun. In 1900, Daeanmun was made the official main gate. Inhwamun was demolished and its materials were recycled some time around 1900 to 1902. It was possibly located around the current location of Junghwamun.

Jowonmun (조원문; 朝元門; Chowŏnmun) was a gate constructed to complete the traditional three-gate system (where visitors must pass through three gates to arrive at the main hall) employed in other palaces. These gates for Deoksugung were, in order, Daeanmun, Jowonmun, and Junghwamun. It was built concurrently with Junghwajeon. It was destroyed in the 1904 fire and rebuilt in a different location, more to the east. It was likely demolished in 1913, during the construction of an Office of the Yi Dynasty building. In 2019, it was reported that there were active plans to reconstruct the gate in the 2020s.

Guseongheon (구성헌; 九成軒; Kusŏnghŏn) was a two-story Western-style building north of Seokjojeon, to the northwest of Junmyeongdang. Little is known about when and how it was built and when it was demolished. Its use is attested to in 1899 and 1907 records. It had verandas with arches over them. Its entrance possibly faced to the north, as there was a gabled roof on that side.
