= Seoul: A 2,000-Year History =

Book series published from 2013 to 2016

- Country: South Korea
- Language: Korean
- Genre: History
- Publisher: Seoul Historiography Institute
- Published: 2013–2016
- No. of books: 40

Seoul: A 2,000-Year History (Korean: 서울 2천년사; RR: Seoul 2cheonnyeonsa) is a book series on the history of Seoul. It consists of 40 volumes published serially by the Seoul Historiography Institute from 2013 to 2016.

The series is available for free in public libraries of Seoul and online in ebook format. Each volume of the series was also individually sold.

== Description ==
A predecessor to the series was a ten-volume book series entitled Seoul: A 600-Year History (서울 육백년사) that was published beginning in 1977 for a period of 20 years. An official from the Seoul Historiography Institute claimed one motivation for revising this series was to correct the misconception that Seoul's history was limited to the Joseon period, when it had been inhabited before then. Furthermore, the series was to incorporate recent research.

The series involved the work of 304 experts in various fields. It contains over 4,000 photos.

The series is organized by era. The first volume is a general introduction, prehistoric and ancient history is covered from volumes 2 to 7, the 918–1392 Goryeo period from 8 to 10, 1392–1897 Joseon period from 11 to 20, the 1876 opening of Korea from 21 to 25, 1910–1945 colonial period from 26 to 30, and modern period from 30 to 40. These are subdivided into around 300 subject areas.

Upon the completion of the series, a special exhibition on it was held for three weeks from January 17, 2017, at the Seoul Metropolitan Library.
