= List of public libraries of Seoul =

| Name | Address | Web-site |
|---|---|---|
| National Library of Korea | Main : Banpo-dong, Seocho-gu Subway Line 2 Seocho Station exit 5. Annex: Yeoksam-dong, Gangnam-gu | Official Site (English) |
| National Assembly Library | Yeouido-dong, Yeoungdeungpo-gu near Yeouido Station on Subway Line 5 (shuttle bus) | Official site (English) |
| Seoul Metropolitan Library | Taepyeongno, Jung-gu near City Hall Station on Seoul Subway Line 1 | Official site |
| Gangnam Municipal Library | Samseong-dong, Gangnam-gu (near Samseong Station on Subway Line 2) | Official site (Korean) |
| Gangdong Municipal Library | Gil-dong, Gangdong-gu | Official site (Korean) |
| Gangseo Municipal Library | Deungchon-dong, Gangseo-gu | Official site (Korean) |
| Gaepo Municipal Library | Gaepo-dong, Gangnam-gu | Official site (Korean) |
| Goduk Municipal Library | Goduk-dong, Gangdong-gu | Official site (Korean) |
| Gochuk Municipal Library | Gochuk 2-dong, Guro-gu | Official site (Korean) |
| Guro Municipal Library | Guro 5-dong, Guro-gu | Official site(English) |
| Namsan Municipal Library | Hooam-dong, Yongsan-gu (within 1 km of Myeong-dong Station) | Official site (Korean/English/Japanese) |
| Dobong Municipal Library | Ssangmoon-dong, Dobong-gu | Official site (Korean) |
| Dongdaemun Municipal Library | Sinseol-dong, Dongdaemun-gu | Official site (Korean) |
| Dongjak Municipal Library | Noryangjin 2-dong, Dongjak-gu | Official site (Korean) |
| Mapo Municipal Library | Ahyeon 1-dong, Mapo-gu | Official site (Korean) |
| Mokdong Municipal Library | Mok-dong, Yangcheon-gu | |
| Seodaemun Municipal Library | Yeonhui 3-dong, Seodaemun-gu | Official site (English) |
| Children's Municipal Library | Sajik-dong, Jongno-gu | |
| Youngdeungpo Municipal Library | Dangsan-dong, Yeoungdeungpo-gu | |
| Yongsan Municipal Library | Hooam-dong, Yongsan-gu | Official site (Korean) |
| Jongdok Municipal Library | Hwa-dong, Jongno-gu (within 500m of Anguk Station) | Official site (Korean) |
| Jongno Municipal Library | Sajik-dong, Jongno-gu | Official site (Korean) |
| Choonggae Municipal Library | Choonggae-dong, Nowon-gu | |
| Korea Social Science Library | Sajik-dong, Jongno-gu | |
| Haksan Technology Library | Dongsoong-dong, Jongno-gu | |
| Korea Braille Library | Cheonho-dong, Gangdong-gu | |
| Korea Welfare Association for the Blind, Braille Library Annexe | Sangil-dong, Gangdong-gu | |
| Korea Students' Library | Mukjong-dong, Jung-gu | |
| Chungnang District Information Library | Jungnang-gu | Official site (English) |
| Eunpyeong Public Library | Bulgwang 2-dong, Eunpyeong-gu | Official site (English) |
| Gwangjin Public Digital Library | Gwangjang-dong, Gwangjin-gu (within 1 km of Gwangnaru Station on Subway Line 5) | Official site (Korean) |
| Korea Foundation Cultural Center | JoongAng Ilbo Building in Jung-gu, near Namdaemun near Exit 9 of City Hall Station on Line 1 and Line 2 | Official site (English) |
