= Seoul Metropolitan Library =

Library in South Korea

Coordinates: 37°33′59.06″N 126°58′40.16″E

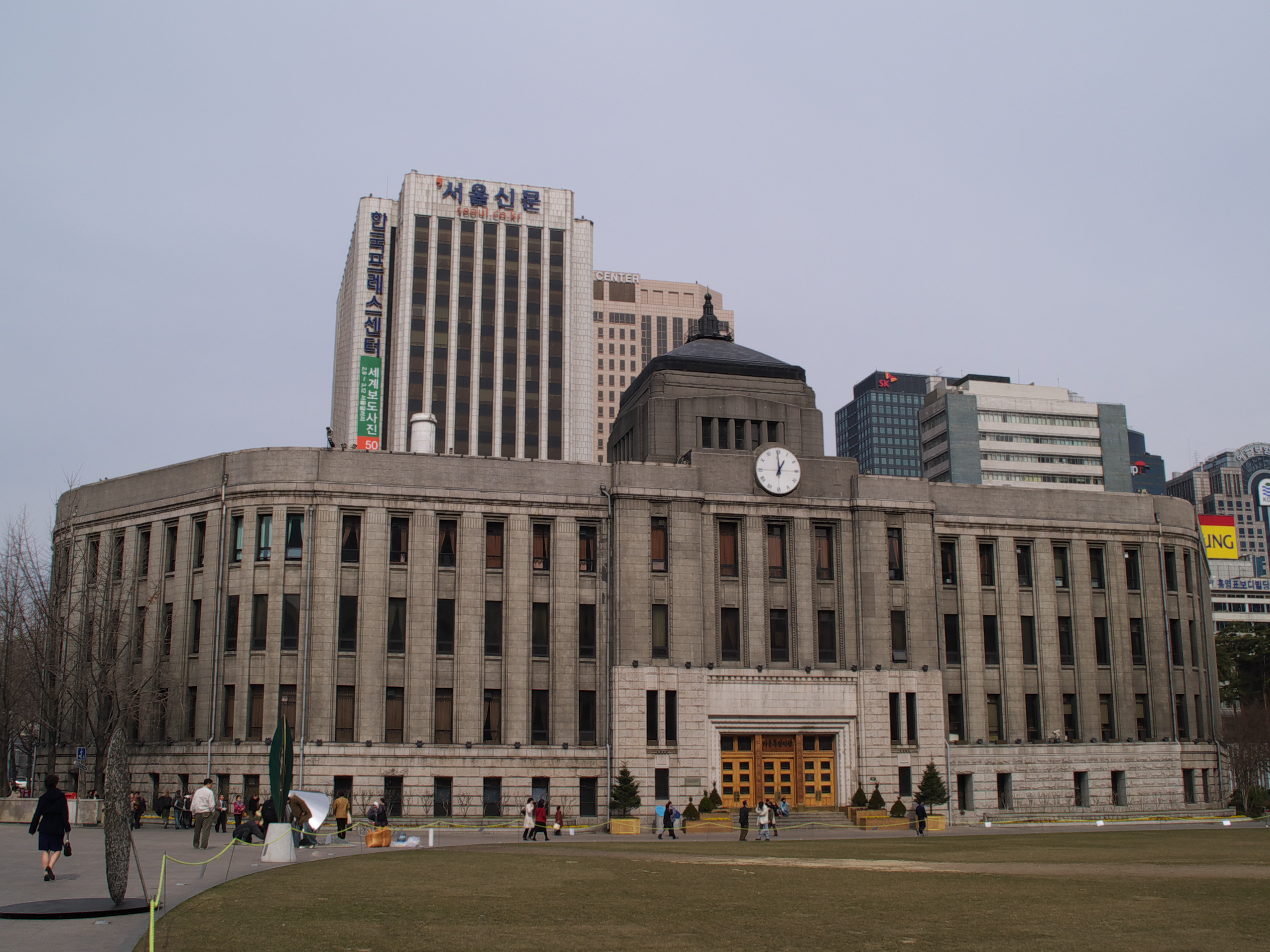
- Location: Taepyeongno, Jung-gu, Seoul, South Korea
- Established: 2008

Collection
- Size: 200.000

Access and use
- Population served: all citizens (aged over 19)

Other information
- Website: www.lib.seoul.go.kr

- Seoul Metropolitan Library
- Hangul: 서울도서관
- Hanja: 서울圖書館
- RR: Seoul doseogwan
- MR: Sŏul tosŏgwan

Seoul Metropolitan Library (Korean: 서울도서관) is a Metropolitan Library on Taepyeongno, Jung District, Seoul, South Korea. It faces the Seoul City Hall and Seoul Plaza, and is next to the City Hall Station on Seoul Subway Line 1.

== History ==
The structure was built by the Chōsen Architectural Association (朝鮮建築会, Chōsen kenchiku kai) in 1926 during the Japanese occupation. Registered as Cultural Heritage No. 52, it was initially used as the headquarters of the governor-general of Korea.

At the end of the Third Battle of Seoul in 1951 during the Korean War, communist Chinese and North Korean troops fought successfully in chasing out US and UN forces out of the city before marching through ruined Seoul to the building and then planting a North Korean flag on its roof, carried out by a Chinese PVA platoon.

The city hall was expanded 6 times. The main building is a designated registered cultural property of the Republic of Korea. The North building was built in 1962 and the new building in 1986. Both were demolished in 2006 to make way for a new city hall construction.

Original plans called for the historic building to be razed and replaced with a new design, but support for preservation put a halt to demolition. The Cultural Properties Committee, under the Cultural Heritage Administration, registered the building as a historic relic. Eventually, a compromise was reached, preserving the front building facing Seoul Plaza, and allowing construction of a modern building behind the old one.

A large digital clock for the building was installed in 1975, and replaced with an analogue counterpart when Lee Myung-bak was mayor of Seoul. Following the competition for a new city hall, the building was reconstructed and reopened as library. The building, registered as a cultural asset, has been converted into a library with a collection of more than 200,000 books.

== Public transportation ==
- City Hall Station (Seoul)
- City Hall Station (Seoul)

== See also ==
- List of public libraries of Seoul
