= Koreana Hotel =

Skyscraper and hotel in Seoul

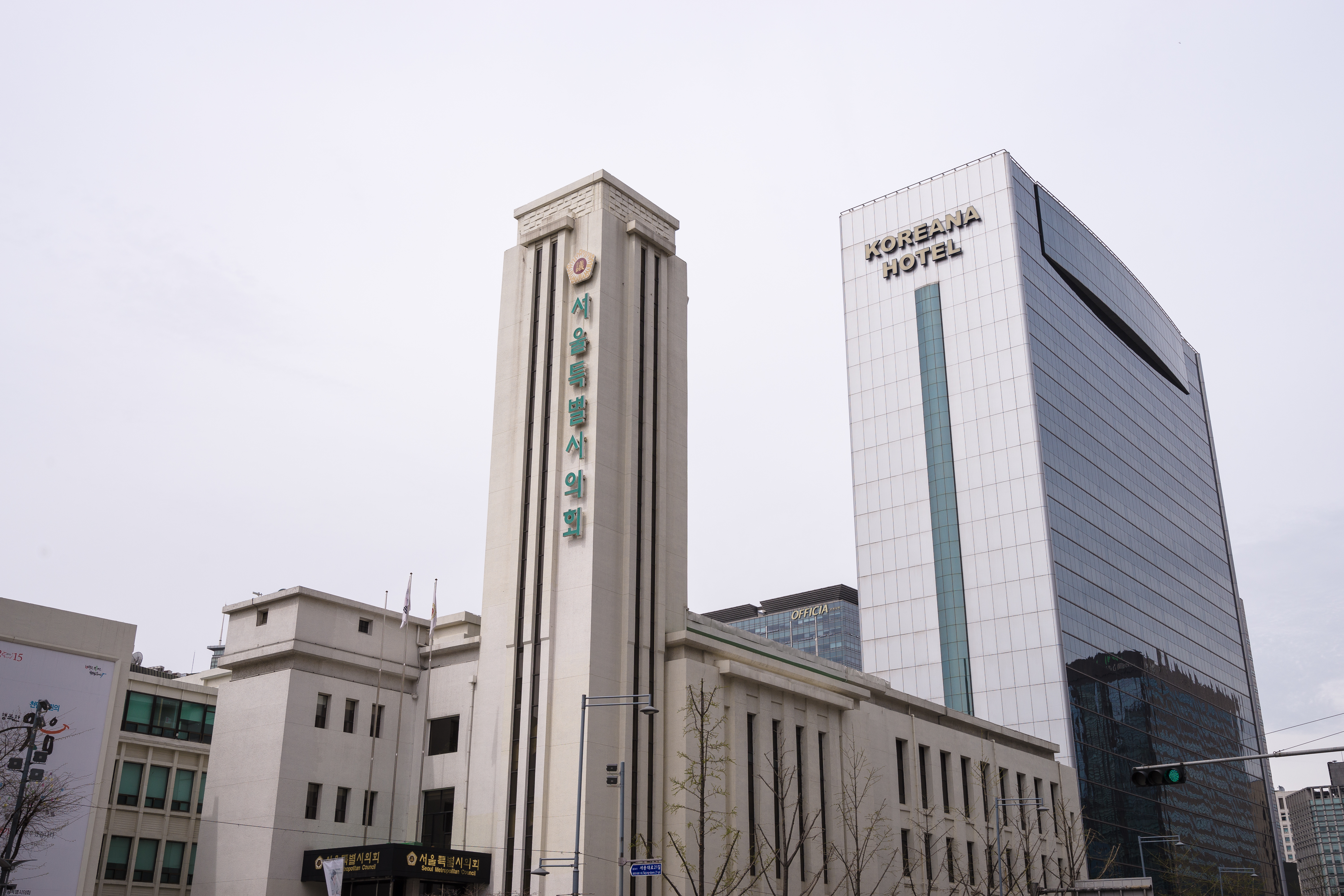
- Koreana Hotel, viewed behind Seoul Metropolitan Council

- Location in Seoul

General information
- Location: Taepyeongno, Jung-gu, Seoul, South Korea
- Coordinates: 37°34′6″N 126°58′35″E
- Opening: 1971

Technical details
- Floor count: 14

Other information
- Number of rooms: 344
- Number of restaurants: 7

The Koreana Hotel (Korean: 코리아나 호텔) is a skyscraper hotel on Taepyeongno (thoroughfare), in Jung District, Seoul, South Korea. The hotel features a marble lobby and has 344 rooms within its 14 stories.

Construction began on the hotel on 20 December 1969. It was completed exactly two years later to the day in 1971. On 11 April 1989, it received 4-star status from the Tourist Hotel Classification. Nine rooms were added in October 1998 and nine more in April 2004. In 2001, renovations were completed on its exterior, showcasing a sleeker-looking modern hotel. The hotel contains a number of restaurants, including Sunrise, Danube, Saka-e (catering in Japanese cuisine), Great Shanghai, The Blue, Mr. Chow and Peltierone. The Rough Guide to Seoul describes it as "half the price of some of its competitors, but with similar rooms and service standards".
