= Taepyeongno =

Road in Seoul, South Korea

- Hangul: 태평로
- Hanja: 太平路
- RR: Taepyeongno
- MR: T'aep'yŏngno

Taepyeongno (Korean: 태평로) is a major thoroughfare in the central districts of Seoul, South Korea and the second longest road next to Sejongno in the Gangbuk area. With a 1.1 km length and a 50 m width, Taepyeongno originates at 139 Sejongno in Jongno District and terminates at Namdaemun in Jung District. It runs southwards through Sogong-dong, Jeong-dong, Taepyeongno 1, 2 ga-dong, Bukchang-dong and Mugyo-dong. Numerous landmarks along here include Koreana Hotel.

== Gallery ==
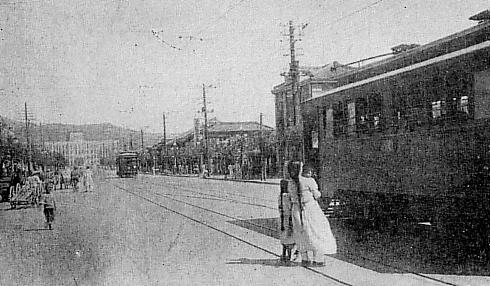
Taepyongno during Korea under Japanese rule's period

== See also ==
- Gwanghwamun Plaza
- Seoul Plaza
- Seoul City Hall
- Seoul Metropolitan Library
- Namdaemun
