= Namsan Public Library =

Library in Seoul, South Korea

Coordinates: 37.5530°N 126.9815°E

The Namsan Public Library (Korean: 남산도서관) is a library located in Yongsan-gu near Mt. Namsan of Seoul, South Korea. Since its establishment on October 22, 1922, during the Japanese occupation, the library has owned a variety of resources encompassing from ancient historic books, Japanese books to contemporary digital technology books.

The main users of the Namsan public library are adults. Also, the Namsan public library offers a special room for children of multicultural families.
