= Seoul Plaza =

Plaza in Seoul, South Korea

- Public square

Korean transcriptions
- Hangul: 서울광장
- Hanja: 서울廣場
- RR: Seoul gwangjang
- MR: Sŏul kwangjang
- {{{other_names}}}
- View of Seoul Plaza
- Features: fountain, ice rink
- Opened: May 1, 2004
- Area: 3,995 pyeong (1.321 ha)
- Surface: grass
- Owner: Seoul Metropolitan Government
- Location: Taepyeongno, Jung-gu; Seoul, South Korea
- Interactive map of Seoul Plaza
- Coordinates: 37°33′56″N 126°58′41″E

Seoul Future Heritage
- Reference no.: 2013-134

Seoul Plaza (Korean: 서울광장) is a central plaza located in front of Seoul City Hall at Taepyeongno, Jung District, Seoul, South Korea. It was reopened on 1 May 2004, by Seoul Metropolitan Government, with the purpose of providing the public an open space. It is part of the city's plans for environmentally friendly renovation projects such as the Cheonggye Stream and Gwanghwamun Plaza.

== Description ==
The site was originally a traffic square with a 40-year-old fountain that was demolished and the nearby space was renovated. Seoul Plaza is elliptical in shape, covering 3,995 pyeong (13,207 m^{2}) in total and 1,904 pyeong (6,294 m^{2}) for grass area. An underground water tank was installed along with 48 lighting around the grass square. The underground tank stores rain water for use in the sprinklers on the lawn.

The plaza has been the site of protests against US beef imports in South Korea, and Korea Queer Culture Festival. The plaza was also the Starting Line of The Amazing Race Australia 4.

== Administration ==
As of 1 June 2011, the Plaza along with Gwanghwamun Plaza are designated as smoke-free zones by the Seoul Metropolitan Government. Smokers are fined ₩100,000 in violation.

Every winter since 2004, the Plaza has hosted an open air ice-rink from mid-December to February the following year, following which are replaced with green lawn and the fountain operational again.

== Other information ==
=== Transportation ===
- The Plaza can be reached by taking Subway Line 1 and exiting at City Hall Station, Exit 5, which is just a 1-minute walk (89 meters) away.

== See also ==
- List of parks in Seoul
- Seoul City Hall
