= List of Buddhist temples in Seoul =

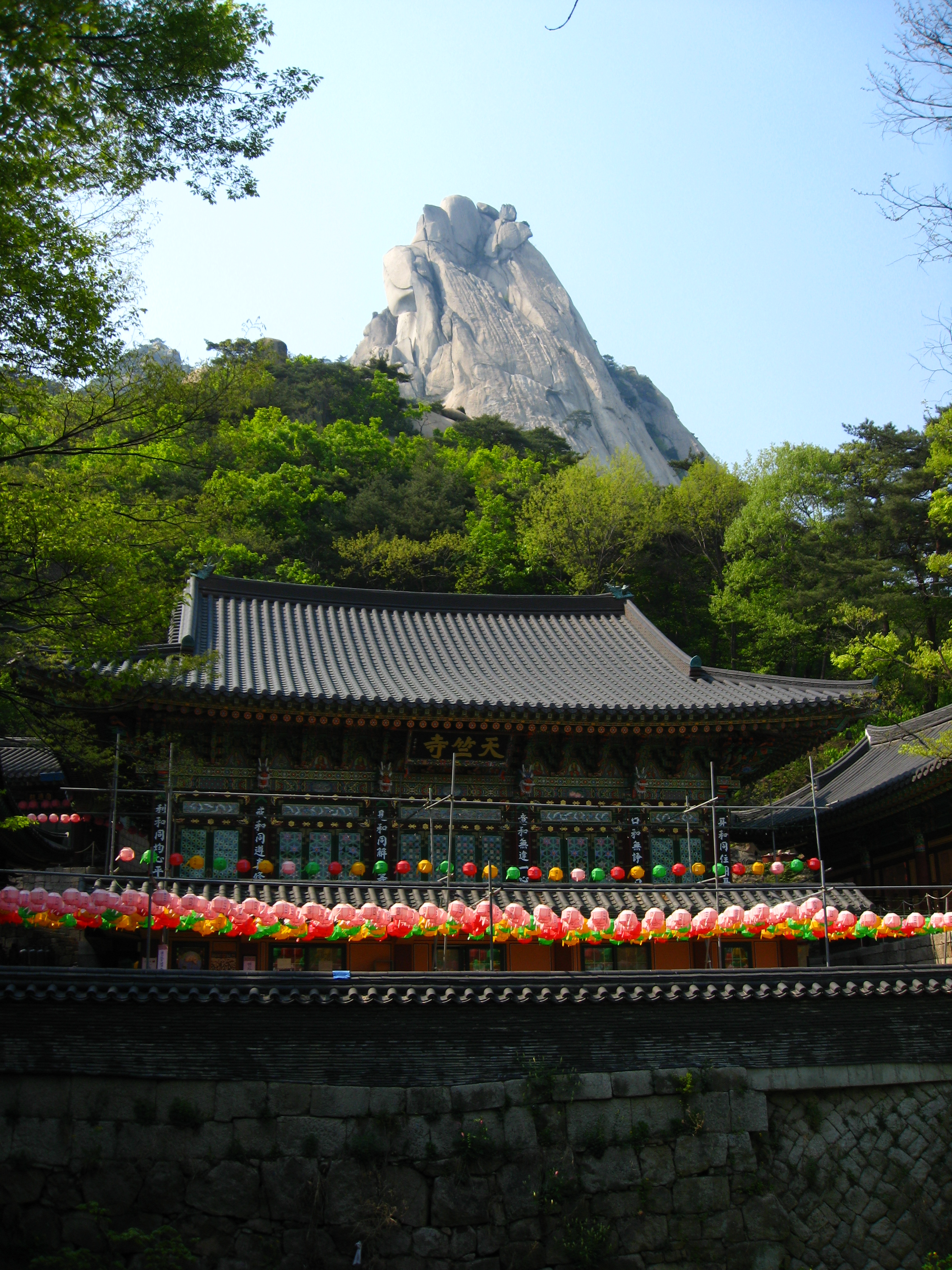
Cheonchuksa

This is a list of Buddhist temples in Seoul, South Korea.

== List ==
| Temple | Hangul | Hanja | Established | Location | Type | Link |
|---|---|---|---|---|---|---|
| Gamnoam | 감로암 | 甘露庵 | 1912 | 15 Chungsin-dong, Jongno-gu | Jogye Order | |
| Gaeunsa | 개운사 | 開運寺 | 1396 | 15 Anam-dong, Seongbuk-gu | Jogye Order | |
| Gyeongguksa | 경국사 | 慶國寺 | 1325 | 753 Jeongneung-dong, Seongbuk-gu | Jogye Order | |
| Gwaneumsa | 관음사 | 觀音寺 | presumed in 895 | 519-3 Namhyeon-dong, Gwanak-gu | Jogye Order | |
| Geumseonsa | 금선사 | 金仙寺 | before 1405 | 196-1 Gugi-dong, Jongno-gu | Jogye Order | |
| Naewonsa | 내원사 | 內院寺 | | San 1, Jeongneung-dong, Seongbuk-gu | Jogye Order | |
| Dalmasa | 달마사 | 達摩寺 | | 61-34 Heukseok-dong, Dongjak-gu | Jogye Order | |
| Daegaksa | 대각사 | 大覺寺 | | 2 Bongik-dong, Jongno-gu | Jogye Order | |
| Daeseongsa | 대성사 | 大聖寺 | | San 140-2 Seocho-dong, Seocho-gu | 대각회 | |
| Doseonsa | 도선사 | 道詵寺 | 862 | 264 Ui-dong, Gangbuk-gu | Jogye Order | |
| Manworam | 만월암 | 滿月庵 | | San 29-1 Dobong-dong, Dobong-gu | Jogye Order | |
| Myogaksa | 묘각사 | 妙覺寺 | 1930 | 178-3 Sungin-dong, Jongno-gu | Gwaneum Order | |
| Munsusa | 문수사 | 文殊寺 | | San 2 Gugi-dong, Jongno-gu | Jogye Order | |
| Mitasa | 미타사 | 彌陀寺 | | San 81-13 Gaehwa-dong, Gangseo-gu | Jogye Order | |
| Mitasa | 미타사 | 彌陀寺 | | 395 Oksu-dong, Seongdong-gu | Jogye Order | |
| Mitasa | 미타사 | 彌陀寺 | | 51 Bomun-dong 3-ga, Seongbuk-gu | Jogye Order | |
| Baengnyeonsa | 백련사 | 白蓮寺 | | 321 Hongeun-dong, Seodaemun-gu | Taego Order | |
| Beobansa | 법안사 | 法安寺 | | San 6801 Ui-dong, Gangbuk-gu | Wonhyo Order | |
| Bogwangsa | 보광사 | 普光寺 | | San 63-9 Ui-dong, Gangbuk-gu | Jogye Order | |
| Bomunsa | 보문사 | 普門寺 | 635 | 168 Bomun-dong 3-ga, Seongbuk-gu | Bomun Order | |
| Bongguksa | 봉국사 | 奉國寺 | | 637 Jeongneung-dong, Seongbuk-gu | Jogye Order | |
| Bongwonsa | 봉원사 | 奉元寺 | | San 1 Bongwon-dong, Seodaemun-gu | Taego Order | |
| Bongeunsa | 봉은사 | 奉恩寺 | | 73 Samseong-dong, Gangnam-gu | Jogye Order | |
| Sajaam | 사자암 | 獅子庵 | | 280 Sangdo-dong, Dongjak-gu | Jogye Order | |
| Samseongam | 삼성암 | 三聖庵 | | San 164-5 Suyu-dong, Gangbuk-gu | Jogye Order | |
| Samcheonsa | 삼천사 | 三千寺 | 661 | San 129-1 Jingwanoe-dong, Eunpyeong-gu | Jogye Order | |
| Sorimsa | 소림사 | 少林寺 | 1396 | 80-1 Hongji-dong, Jongno-gu | Jogye Order | |
| Suguksa | 수국사 | 守國寺 | 1459 | 314 Galhyeon-dong, Eunpyeong-gu | Jogye Order | |
| Seunggasa | 승가사 | 僧伽寺 | 756 | San 1 Gugi-dong, Jongno-gu | Jogye Order | |
| Yaksasa | 약사사 | 藥師寺 | | 332-2 Gaehwa-dong, Gangseo-gu | Jogye Order | |
| Yaksuam | 약수암 | 藥水庵 | | 318 Sillim-dong, Gwanak-gu | Jogye Order | |
| Yeonhwasa | 연화사 | 蓮華寺 | | 109-1 Hoegi-dong, Dongdaemun-gu | Jogye Order | |
| Yeonghwasa | 영화사 | 永華寺 | | 9 Guui-dong, Gwangjin-gu | Jogye Order | |
| Okcheonam | 옥천암 | 玉川庵 | | 8 Hongeun-dong, Seodaemun-gu | Jogye Order | |
| Yongguram | 용굴암 | 龍窟庵 | | San 154-1 Sanggye-dong, Nowon-gu | Jogye Order | |
| Yongdeoksa | 용덕사 | 龍德寺 | | San 68-1 Ui-dong, Gangbuk-gu | Jogye Order | |
| Yongamsa | 용암사 | 龍岩寺 | | San 51 Jingwannae-dong, Eunpyeong-gu | | |
| Wontongsa | 원통사 | 圓通寺 | | 546 Dobong-dong, Dobong-gu | Jogye Order | |
| Inwangsa | 인왕사 | 仁王寺 | | San 2 Muak-dong, Jongno-gu | Bonwon Order | |
| Ilseonsa | 일선사 | 一禪寺 | | San 6-1 Pyeongchang-dong, Jongno-gu | | |
| Jaunam | 자운암 | 慈雲庵 | | 194-1 Sillim-dong, Gwanak-gu | Taego Order | |
| Jeokjosa | 적조사 | 寂照寺 | | 593 Donam-dong, Seongbuk-gu | Jogye Order | |
| Jeongbeopsa | 정법사 | 正法寺 | | 330-76 Seongbuk-dong, Seongbuk-gu | | |
| Jogyesa | 조계사 | 曹溪寺 | 1910 | 45 Gyeonji-dong, Jongno-gu | Jogye Order | |
| Hogukjijangsa | 호국지장사 | 護國地藏寺 | | 305 Dongjak-dong, Dongjak-gu | Jogye Order | |
| Jingwansa | 진관사 | 津寬寺 | | San 1, Jingwanoe-dong, Eunpyeong-gu | Jogye Order | |
| Cheonchuksa | 천축사 | 天竺寺 | | 549 Dobong-dong, Dobong-gu | Jogye Order | |
| Cheongnyangsa | 청량사 | 淸凉寺 | | 61 Cheongnyangni-dong, Dongdaemun-gu | Jogye Order | |
| Cheongnyongsa | 청룡사 | 靑龍寺 | | 17-1 Sungin-dong, Jongno-gu | Jogye Order | |
| Hangnimsa | 학림사 | 鶴林寺 | | San 152 Sanggye-dong, Nowon-gu | Jogye Order | |
| Hoapsa | 호압사 | 虎壓寺 | | 234 Siheung-dong, Geumcheon-gu | Jogye Order | |
| Hwagyesa | 화계사 | 華溪寺 | 1522 | 487 Suyu-dong, Gangbuk-gu | Jogye Order | |
| Heungcheonsa | 흥천사 | 興天寺 | | 592 Donam-dong, Seongbuk-gu | Jogye Order | |

== See also ==
- List of Buddhist temples in Korea
- Korean Buddhism
