= Inwangsa =

Buddhist temple in Seoul, South Korea

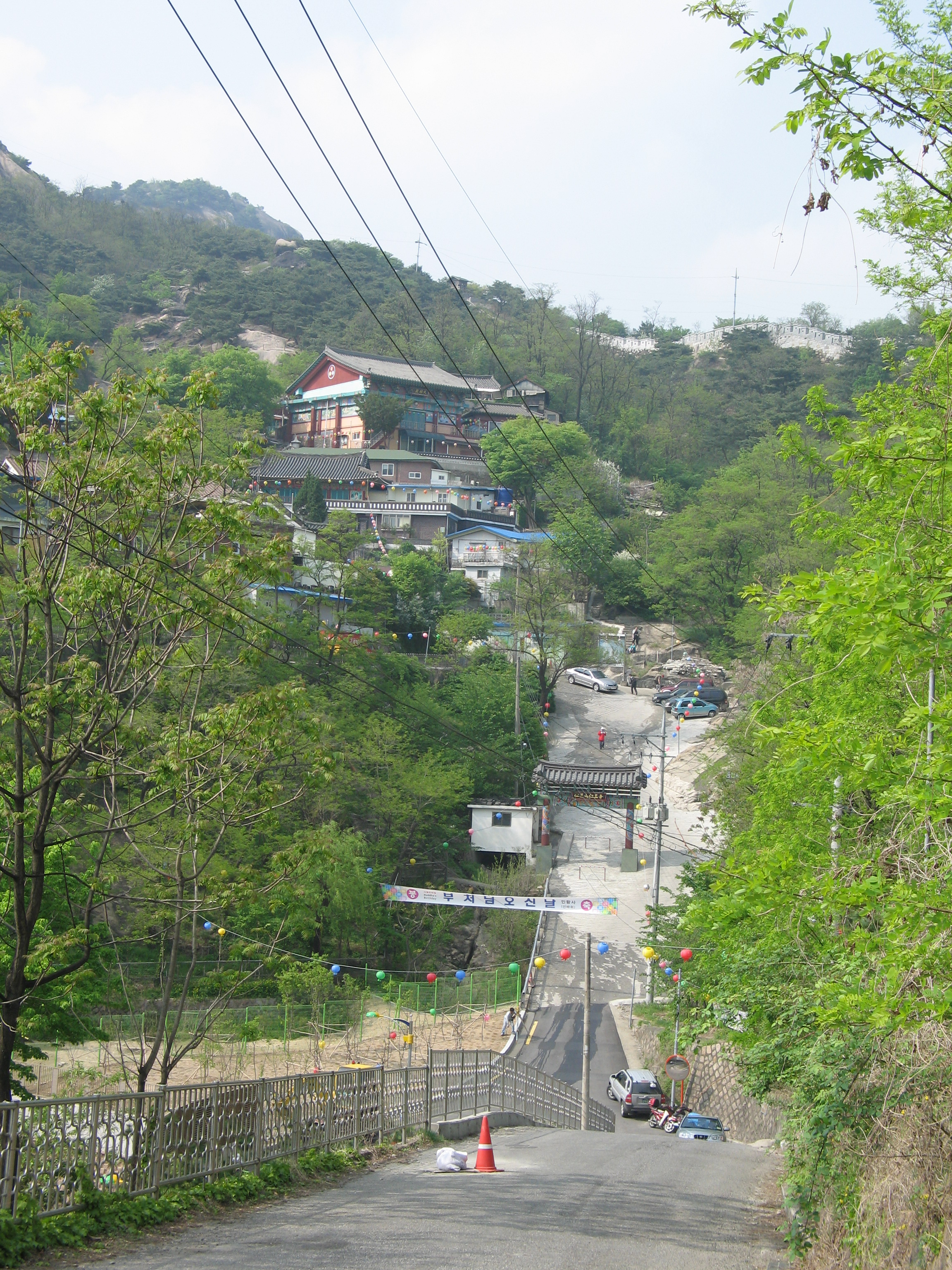

Korean name
- Hangul: 인왕사
- Hanja: 仁旺寺
- RR: Inwangsa
- MR: Inwangsa

Inwangsa (Korean: 인왕사) is a Buddhist temple of the Bonwon Order on the mountain Inwangsan, in Muak-dong, Jongno District, Seoul, South Korea. It consists of a number of hermitages that are together referred to as "Inwangsa".

== History ==
When King Taejo of Joseon Dynasty established the capital city in Seoul, he assigned Josaeng (조생; 祖生), a monk from a Buddhist temple affiliated to the royal court as the head monk of the new temple to establish it at the site.

The temple was destroyed during the 1592–1598 Japanese invasions of Korea and after the Manchu invasions of Korea. Afterwards, the former site was neglected for centuries. In 1912, during the Japanese colonial period, the temple was rebuilt by P'ak Sŏnmuk (박선묵). It was continually expanded over the following decades. It was made a subsidiary temple of another temple in Seoul, Bongeunsa.

The temple now consists of a number of hermitages that are together collectively called Inwangsa.

== See also ==
- List of Buddhist temples in Seoul
- Korean Buddhism
