= Heungcheonsa =

Buddhist temple in Seoul, South Korea

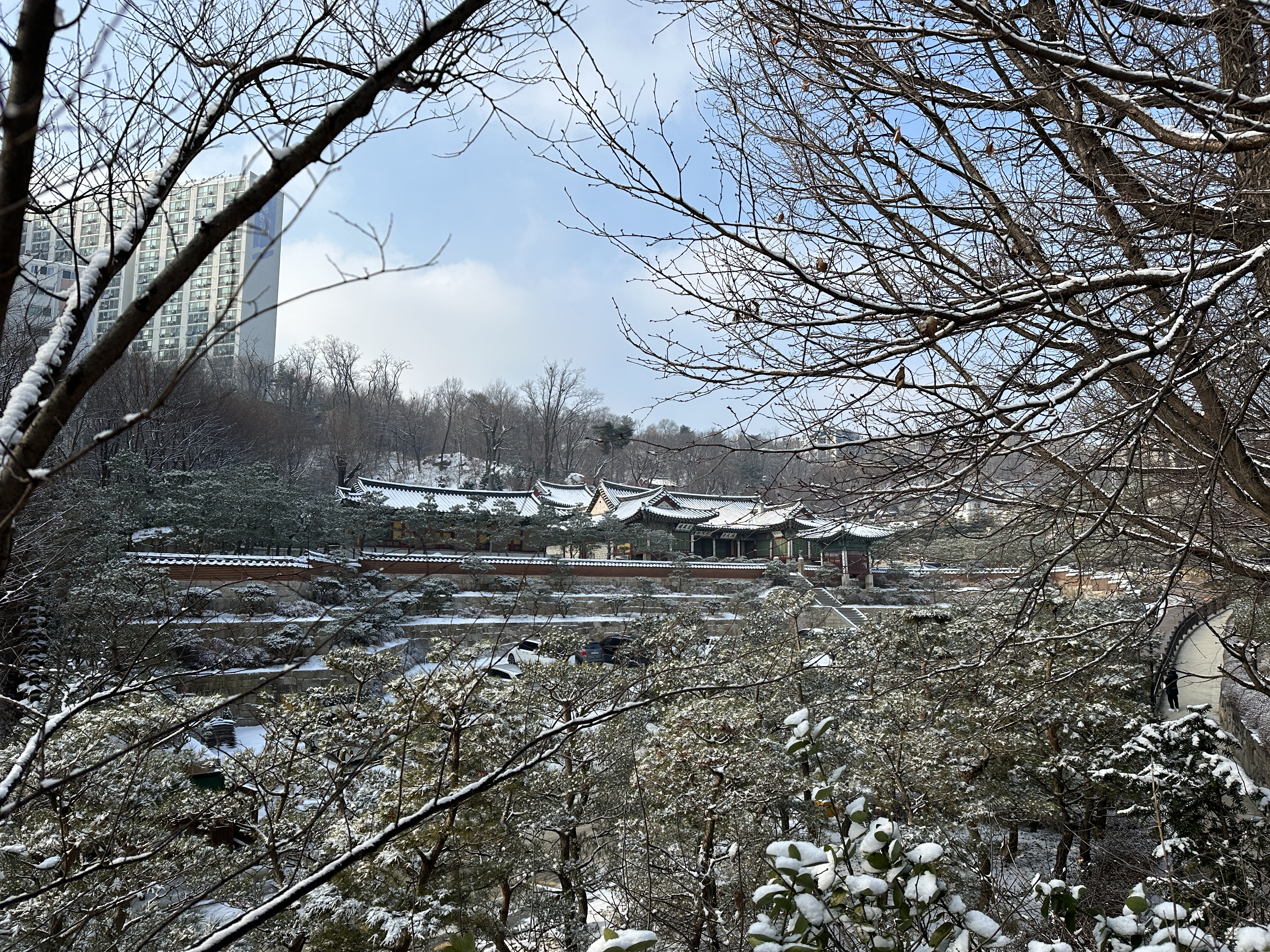
- The temple in winter (2024)

Religion
- Affiliation: Jogye Order, Korean Buddhism

Location
- Location: Donam-dong, Seongbuk District, Seoul, South Korea
- Geographic coordinates: 37.598242°N 127.009228°E

Website
- www.heungcheonsa.net (in Korean)

Korean name
- Hangul: 흥천사
- Hanja: 興天寺
- RR: Heungcheonsa
- MR: Hŭngch'ŏnsa

Heungcheonsa (Korean: 흥천사) is a Buddhist temple of the Jogye Order in Donam-dong, Seongbuk District, Seoul, South Korea.

Daebang Hall, one of the buildings in the temple, is a National Registered Cultural Heritage of South Korea.

The first predecessor to the current temple was built in 1396, during the reign of King Taejo in the early Joseon period. It was originally built in Jeong-dong near Gyeongbokgung, to the east side of the tomb of Queen Sindeok, who had died in the previous year. It was made the head temple of the Jogye order. A three-story pavilion was constructed in June 1398. In December 1504, the temple burned down due to a conflict between Confucian and Buddhist scholars. A large bell for the temple was moved to the palace Deoksugung, where it now remains, and is now National Treasure No. 1460. In 1569, the temple was rebuilt in a different location. In 1794, the temple was moved to its current location, and renamed to Sinheungsa (신흥사; 神興寺). In 1865, under the reign of King Gojong, it was renamed to its current name.

== See also ==
- List of Buddhist temples in Seoul
