= Gyeongguksa =

Buddhist temple in Seoul, South Korea

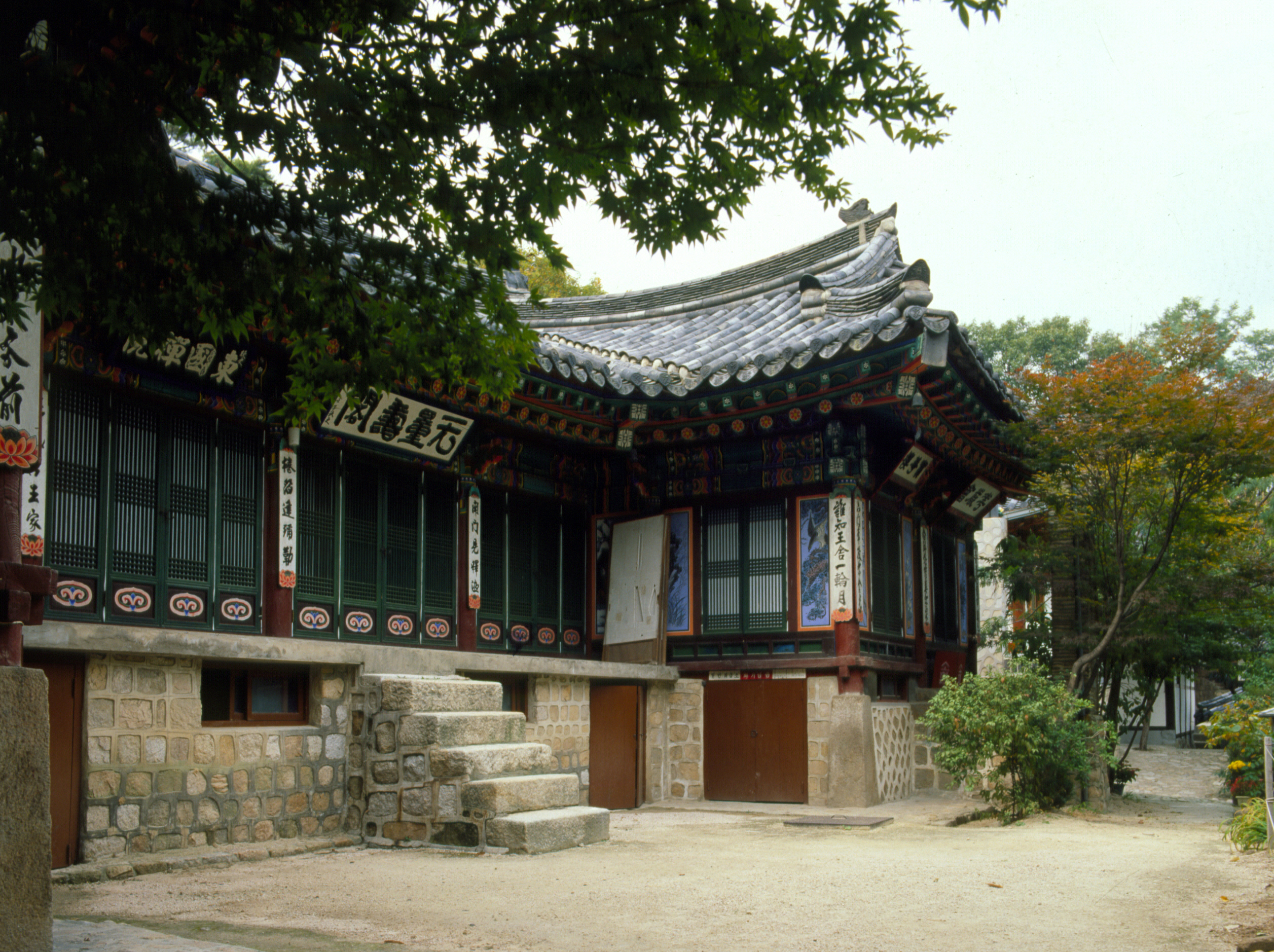
Muryangsugak of Gyeongguksa

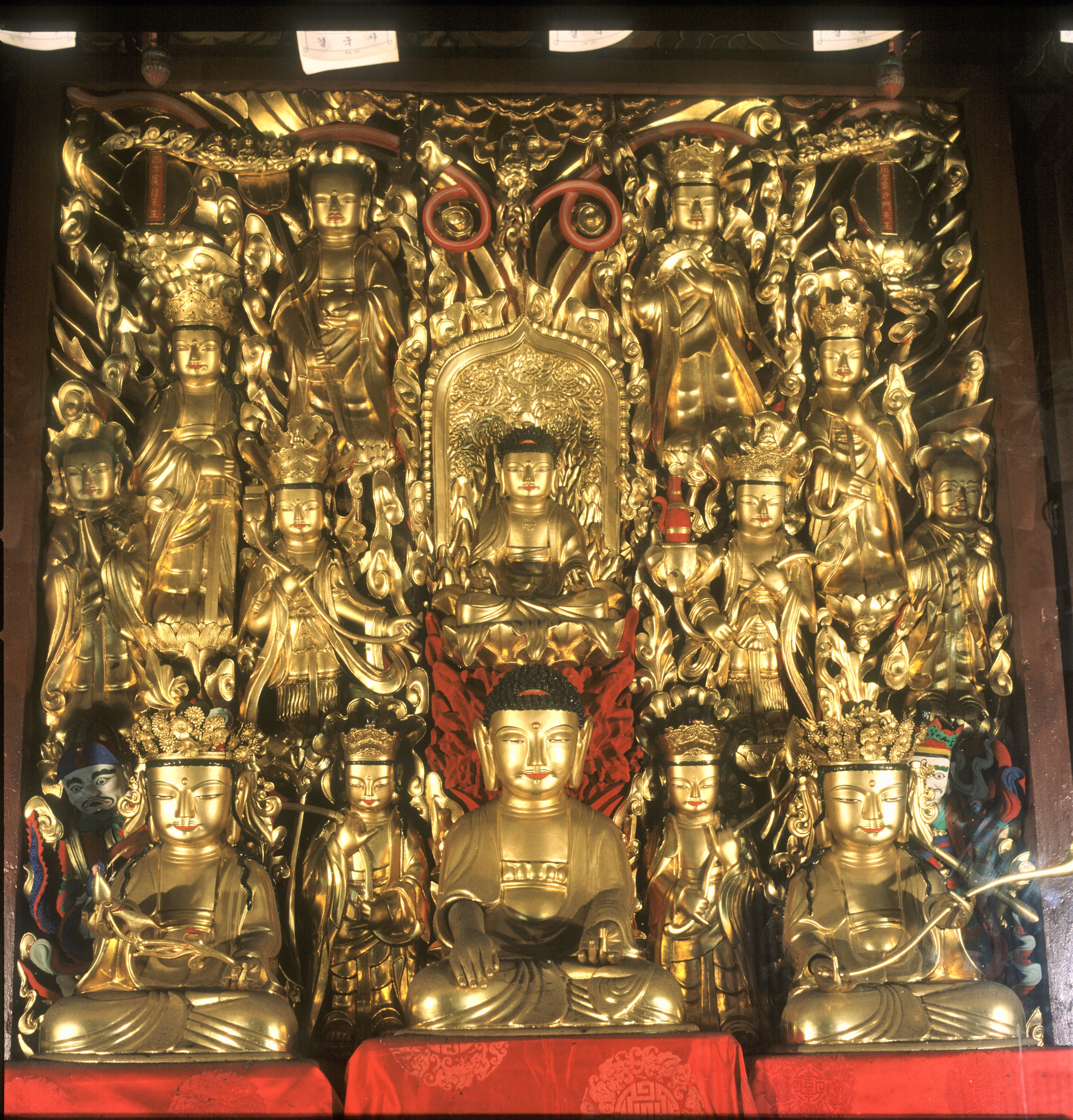
Wooden Amitabha Buddha Altarpiece

Gyeongguksa is a Buddhist temple of the Jogye Order in Seoul, South Korea. Founded in 1325 it is located in 753 Jeongneung-dong, in the Seongbuk District area of the city.

== See also ==
- List of Buddhist temples in Seoul
