= Manworam =

Buddhist temple in Seoul, South Korea

- Hangul: 만월암
- Hanja: 滿月庵
- RR: Manworam
- MR: Manwŏram

Manworam (Korean: 만월암) is a Buddhist temple of the Jogye Order in Seoul, South Korea. It is located at San 29-1 Dobong 1-dong, Dobong District.

== History ==
The temple is said to be founded by the Silla monk Uisang. In 1940, a new building has been constructed. The location is popular meditation location for buddhist monks.

== See also ==
- List of Buddhist temples in Seoul
