= Dalmasa =

Buddhist temple in Seoul, South Korea

Dalmasa is a Buddhist temple of the Jogye Order in Seoul, South Korea. It is located at 61-34 Heukseok 1-dong, Dongjak District.

== History ==
The temple was founded in 1931. In 1998 the temple was recognized for its history and modernization of Korean Buddhism.

== See also ==
- List of Buddhist temples in Seoul
