= Naewonsa =

Buddhist temple in South Korea

Naewonsa is a Buddhist temple of the Jogye Order in Seoul, South Korea. It is located in San 1 Jeongneung-dong in the Seongbuk District area of the city.

== See also ==
- List of Buddhist temples in Seoul
