= Gwaneumsa (Seoul) =

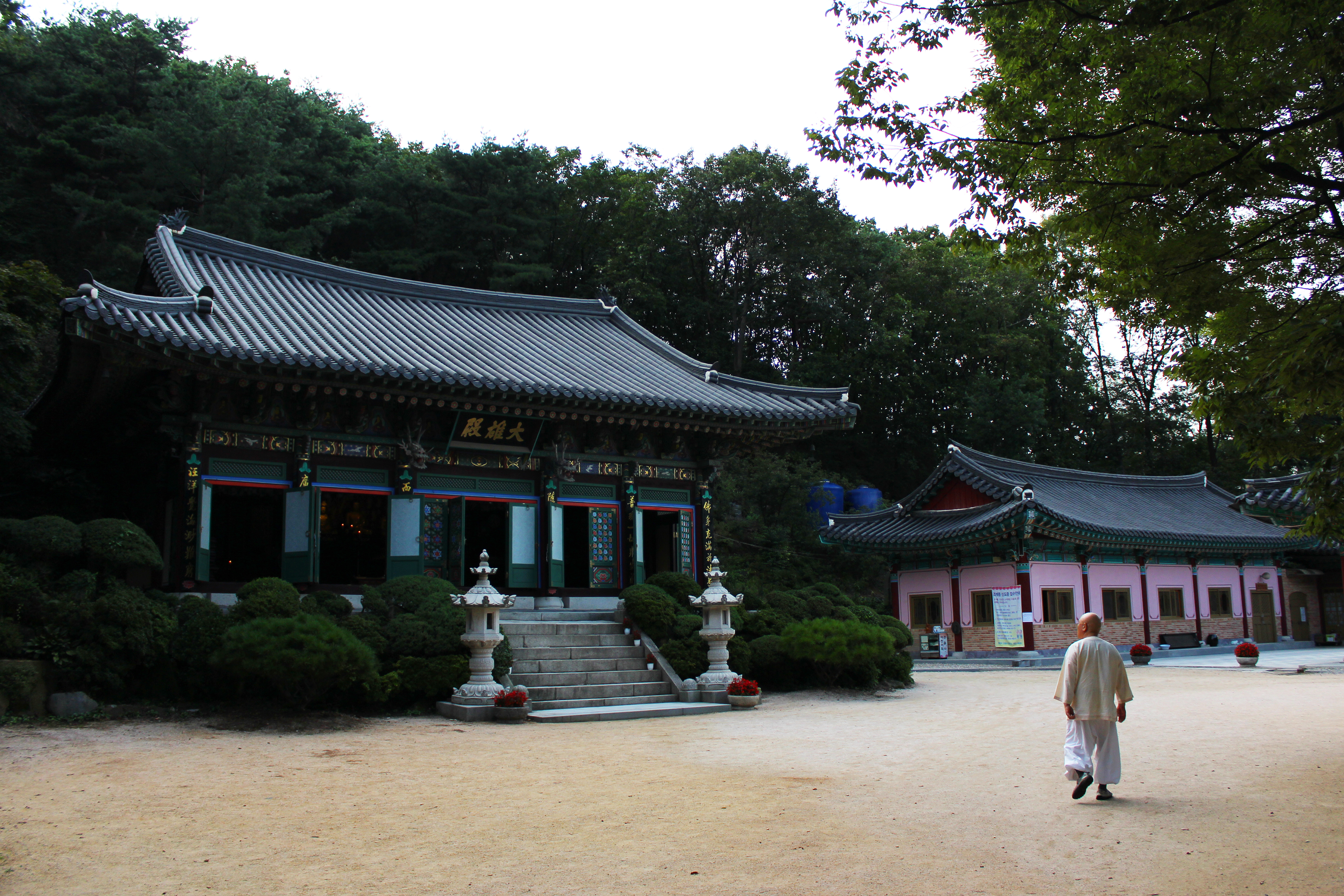

Korean name
- Hangul: 관음사
- Hanja: 觀音寺
- RR: Gwaneumsa
- MR: Kwanŭmsa

Gwaneumsa (Korean: 관음사) is a Buddhist temple of the Jogye Order in Seoul, South Korea. Believed to have been established in 895, it is located in 519-3 Namhyeon-dong in the Gwanak District of the city.

== See also ==
- List of Buddhist temples in Seoul
