= Zenrinkyō =

Japanese new religion

Coordinates: 33°26′56.7″N 130°33′5.1″E

Zenrinkyō (善隣教)
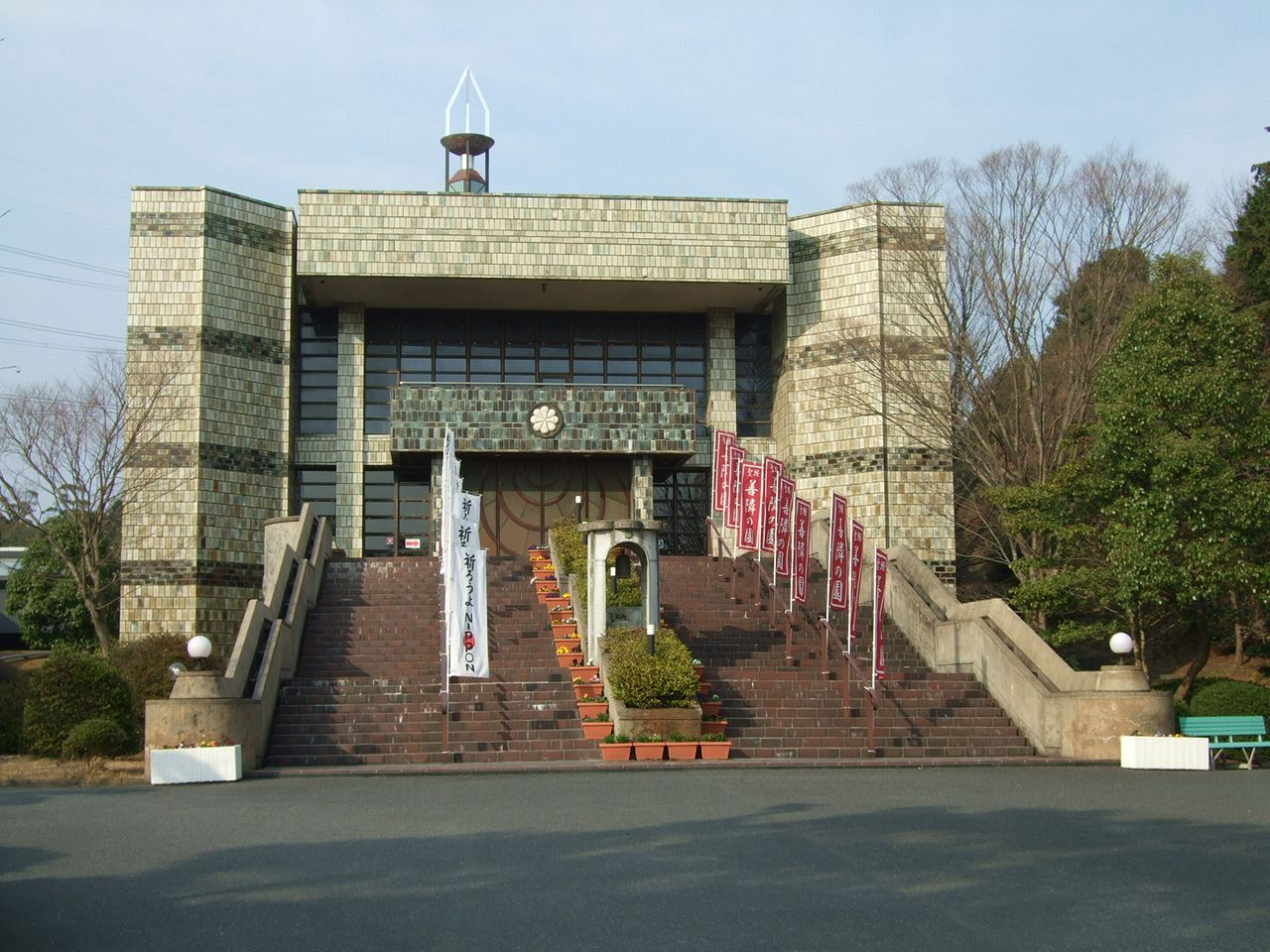
- Zenrinkyō Headquarters in Chikushino
- Classification: Japanese new religions
- Scripture: Holy Scripture: the Garden of Zenrin, et al.
- Head Minister: Rev. Rikihisa Michiomi (力久道臣) (Note: His official title is kyōshu (教主) in Japanese.)
- Region: Japan, South Korea
- Headquarters: Chikushino, Fukuoka Prefecture, Japan
- Founder: Rikihisa Tatsusai (力久辰斎)
- Origin: 1952 (Note: The year that it was officially registered as a religious organization under the Religious Corporations Law (宗教法人法, shūkyō hōjinhō).); Taku, Saga as Zuihōen Seishin Shūyō Dōjō (瑞鳳園精神修養道場), then Tenchi Kōdō Zenrikai (天地公道善隣会)
- Other name: Zenrinkai (善隣会)
- Official website: www.zenrinkyo.or.jp

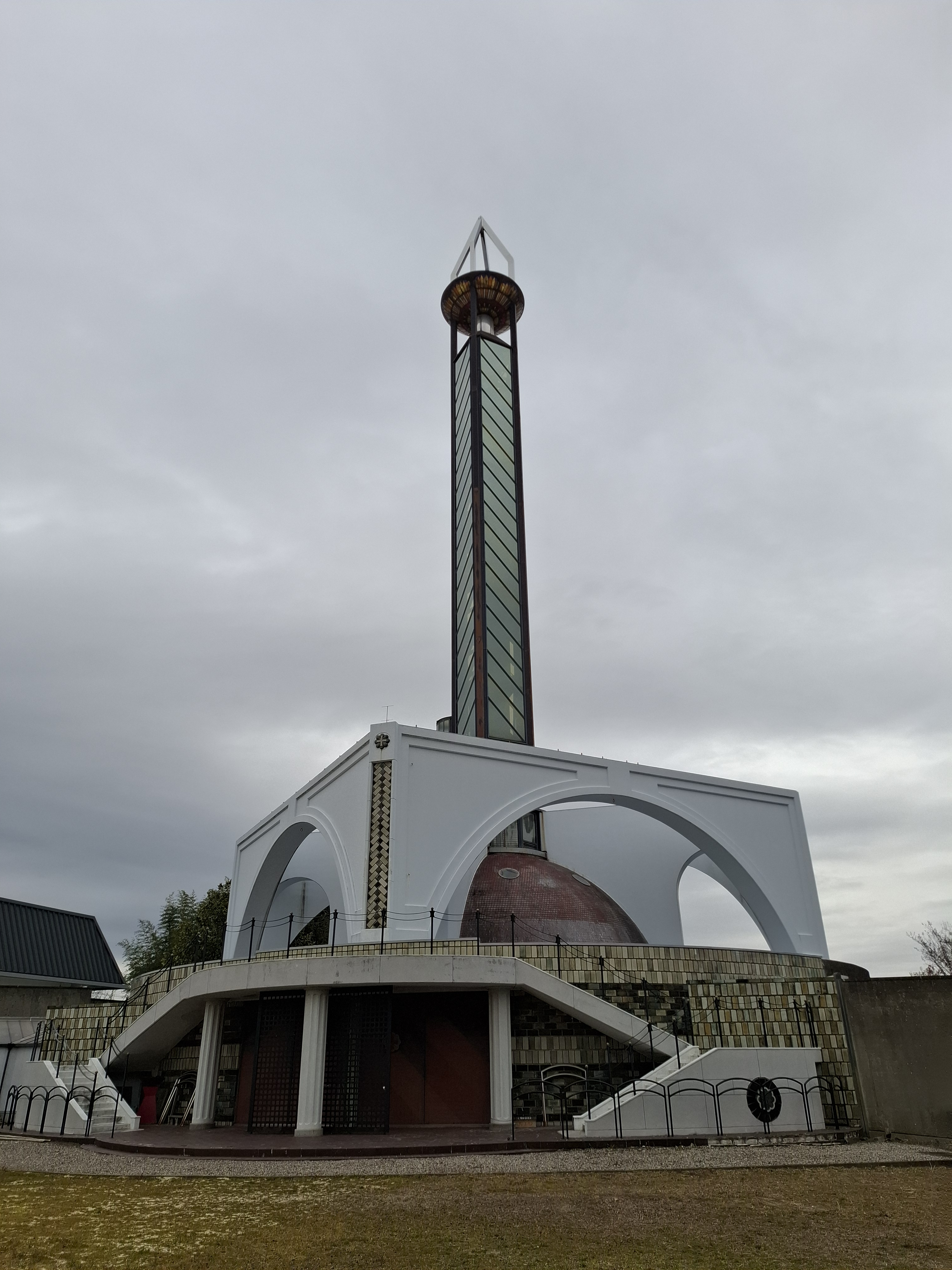
The tower at Zenrinkyo's headquarters in Chikushino

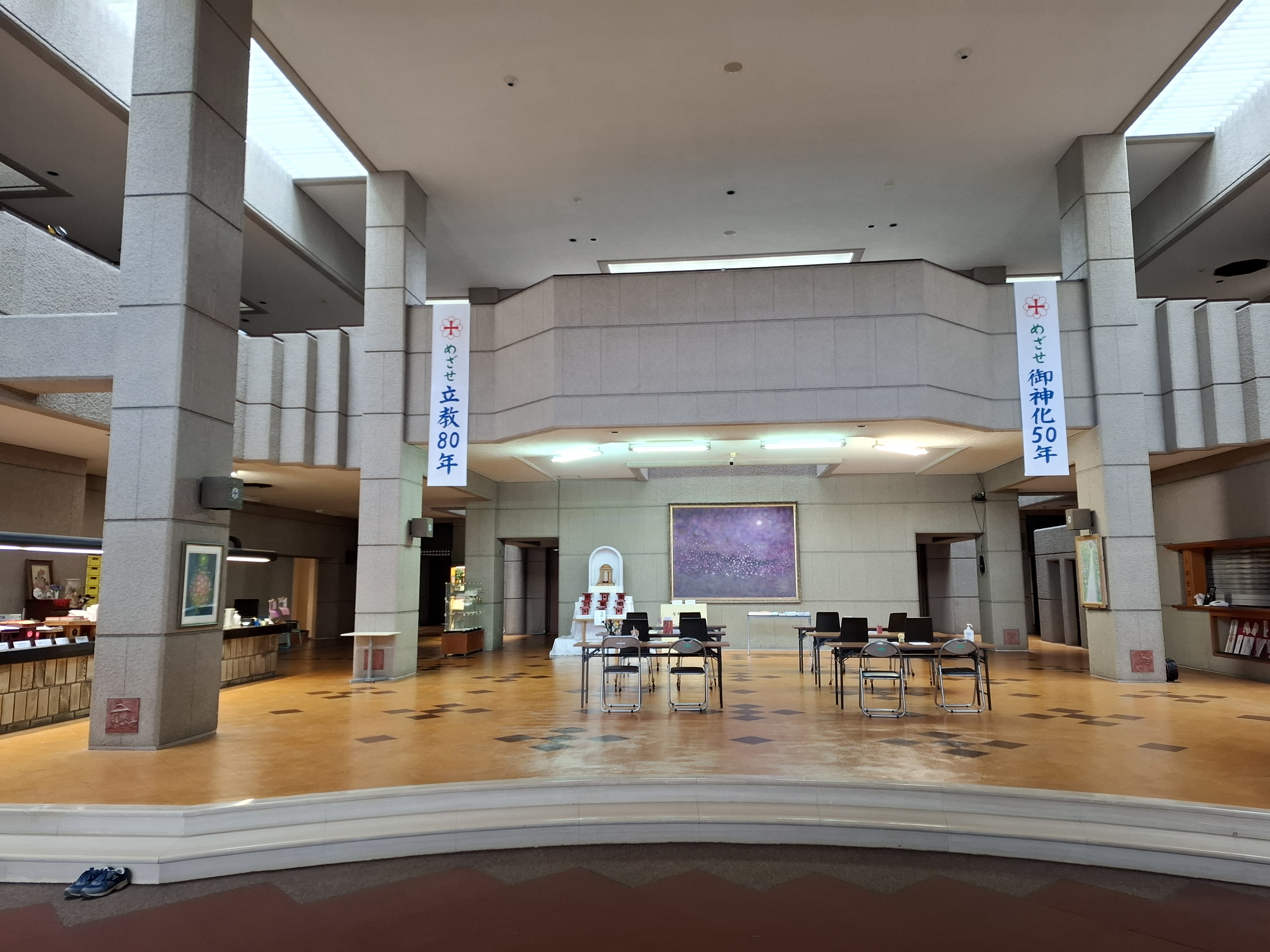
The interior of Zenrinkyo's main headquarters building in Chikushino

Zenrinkyō (善隣教), also known as Zenrinkai (善隣会), is a Shinto-based Shinshūkyō (Japanese new religion) founded in 1947. It was founded by Rikihisa Tatsusai (力久辰斎) as Tenchi Kōdō Zenrinkai, and is headquartered in Fukuoka Prefecture. Zenrinkyō was registered as a legal religious corporation under the Shūkyō Hōjinrei ordinance in 1948. In 1994, the group had a claimed nominal membership of 450,000 under the leader Rikihisa Ryūseki.

Its headquarters is located just to the east of Haruda Station in Chikushino, Fukuoka Prefecture, Japan.

== History ==
Initially, Rikihisa Tatsusai (力久辰斎) (28 October 1906 – 29 September 1977), who is venerated by Zenrinkyō followers today as Go-shinzonsama (御神尊様), spread the faith of the Jikkōkyō-affiliated Rikihisa Kyōkai (力久教会). This was the religious organization of his father, Rikihisa Tatsusaburo (力久辰三郎), who worked as a religious figure and a spiritual medium for police and government works. Rikihisa Tatsusaburo died on 20 October 1926.

=== Rikihisa Tatsusai ===
Like in many shinshūkyō, the position of head of a religion organization passes on from a parent to his or her child who is related by blood. He settled in Seoul (then called Keijō in Japanese) from September 1929 to April 1938, for the purpose of proselytization such as running the aforementioned religious facility of his father's legacy in Asahi-machi (旭町) (Note: Generally covers today's Myeong-dong and Hoehyeon-dong.), working as a spiritual medium for police and government works like his father, and especially his striving for personal spiritual improvement that became his most important experience, the four-year training in a cave situated deep in Bukhansan. Any landmarks for pilgrimage and religious holy grounds are called oyukiba (御行場) in the religious tradition. The cave in question is in the southwestern part of today's Bukhansan National Park and is called the Cave of Bats by today's Zenrinkyō followers. The other two oyukiba are Elephant Rock (象の岩, zō no iwa) and Dragon Rock (龍の岩, ryū no iwa) that are also located in the South Korean national park in question. (Note: The third photo of the post from the official Zenrinkyō-affiliated blog suggests that the oyukiba, Elephant Rock and Dragon Rock, are within a close distance to Mokjeonggul (목정굴), a Buddhist facility that is right below Geumseonsa (금선사).)

=== Spread to South Korea ===
The religion that is now Zenrinkyō began proselytizing in South Korea after Rikihisa Tatsusai's visit to Seoul on 20 May 1971. The current address of the South Korean branch church is 6, Segeomjeong-ro 4-gil, Seodaemun-gu, Seoul (Hongje-dong) on the third floor. (Note: South Korea does not use the ground floor scheme.)

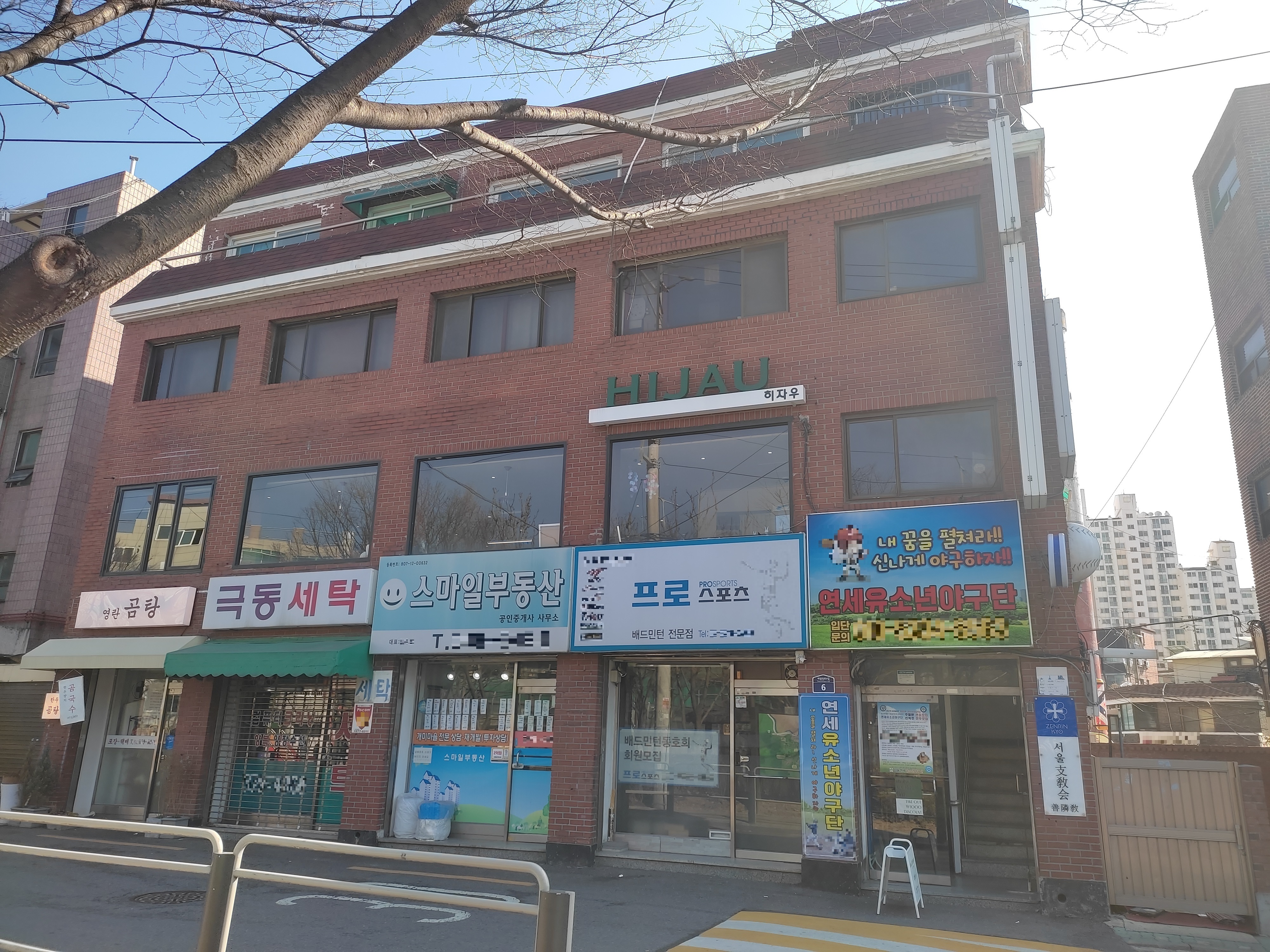
The building that houses the South Korean branch of Zenrinkyō in Seoul

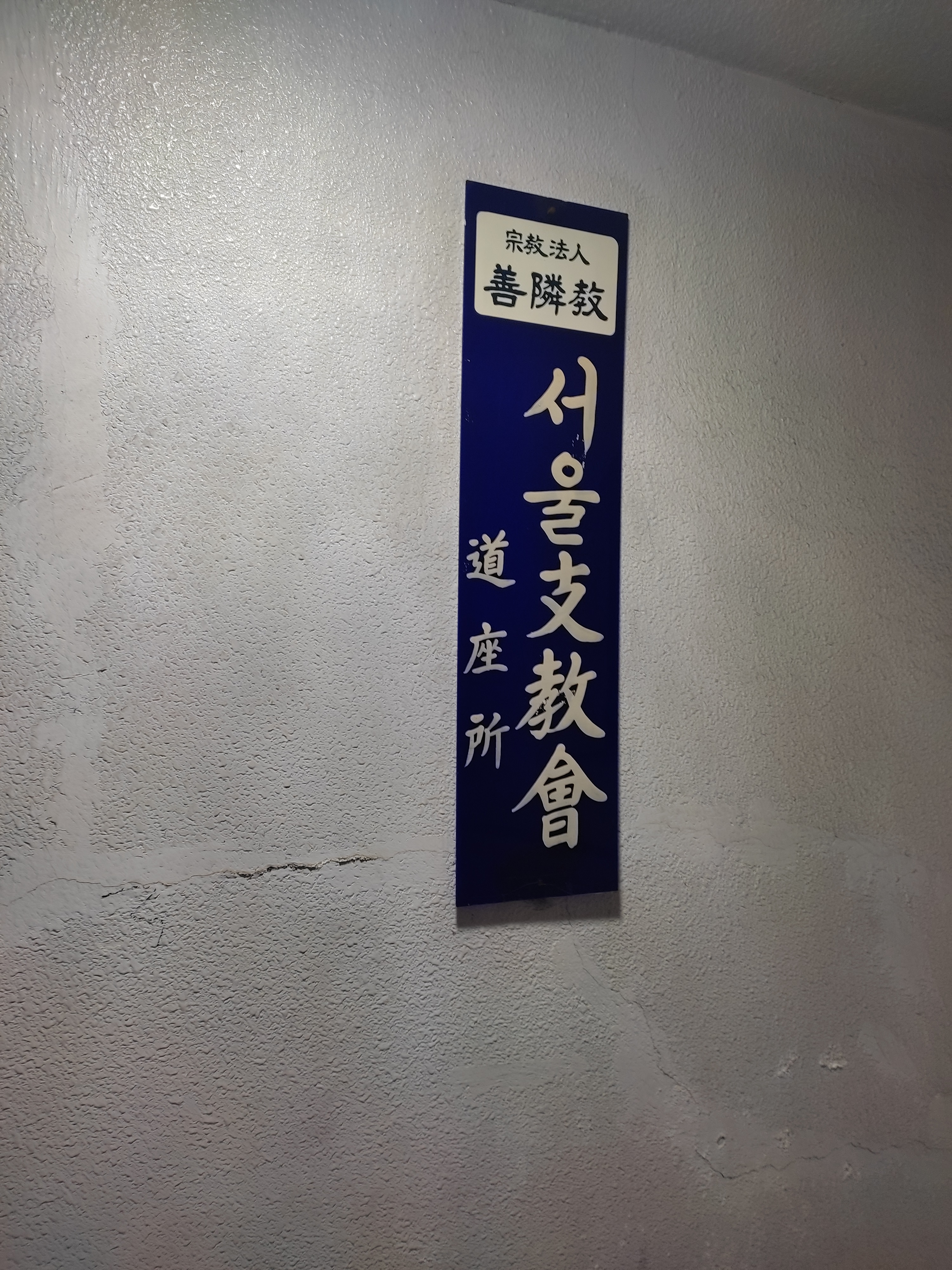
The nameplate of the South Korean branch of Zenrinkyō in Seoul

== List of religious scriptures ==
Most of the scriptures are listed in Japan's Religious Information Resource Center.

- The Story of the Founder (教祖伝, Kyōsoden), first published on 20 October 1976 (Showa 51), written by Komiya Akira (小宮 章) (Note: The author's name can be transcribed as Koyama Akira (小山 章).)
  - Go-shinzonsama monogatari (御神尊様物語) (title of a 1989 illustrated children's storybook and also a manga written and illustrated by Fukuda Kazuko (福田 和子) in 2014, based on Kyōsoden (教祖伝) and Kami e no Michi (神への道))
- Holy Scripture: the Garden of Zenrin (［聖経］善隣の園, Seikyō Zenrin no Sono)
- Holy Scripture: the Book of Heaven (［聖経］天の巻, Seikyō Ama no Maki), first published on 20 May 1965 (Showa 40).
- Holy Scripture: the Way of being towards God (［神典］神への道, Shinden: Kami e no Michi)
- The Reality of Destiny (運命の実態, Unmei no Jittai)
- Miuta Thousand Poems (みうた千首, Miuta Senshu) (The most recent edition, published in 2013, is Miuta Two Thousand Poems (みうた二千首, Miuta Nisenshu).)
