= Daegaksa =

Buddhist temple in Seoul, South Korea

Coordinates: 37°34′25.8″N 126°59′30.8″E

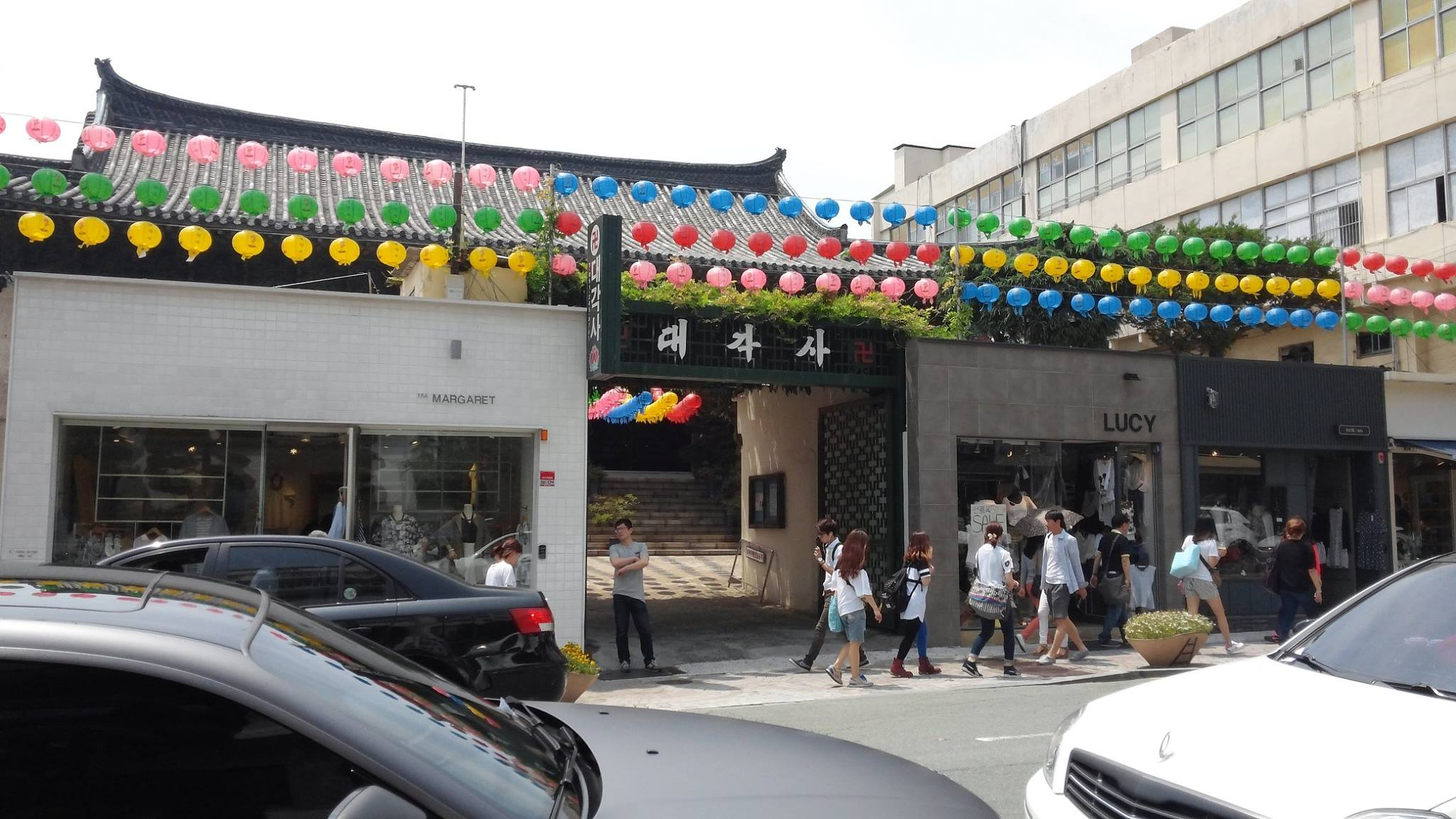

Korean name
- Hangul: 대각사
- Hanja: 大覺寺
- RR: Daegaksa
- MR: Taegaksa

Daegaksa (Korean: 대각사) is a Buddhist temple of the Jogye Order in Bongik 2-dong, Jongno District, Seoul, South Korea.

Daegaksa Temple, established in 1911 by the Buddhist monk Yongseong Seunim, is located near Changdeokgung Palace. Yongseong was one of the 33 leaders who participated in the March 1st Movement for Korean independence and played an influential role in modernizing Korean Buddhism. Initially, the temple began as a small hanok, but it underwent a complete reconstruction in 1986. Today, Daegaksa features a main gate, a belfry, and a three-story temple structure.

== See also ==
- List of Buddhist temples in Seoul
