= Gamnoam =

Buddhist temple in Seoul, South Korea

Gamnoam is a Buddhist temple of the Jogye Order in Seoul, South Korea. Founded in 1912 it is located at 15 Chungsin-dong in the Jongno District area of the city.

== See also ==
- List of Buddhist temples in Seoul
