= Geumseonsa =

Buddhist temple in Seoul, South Korea

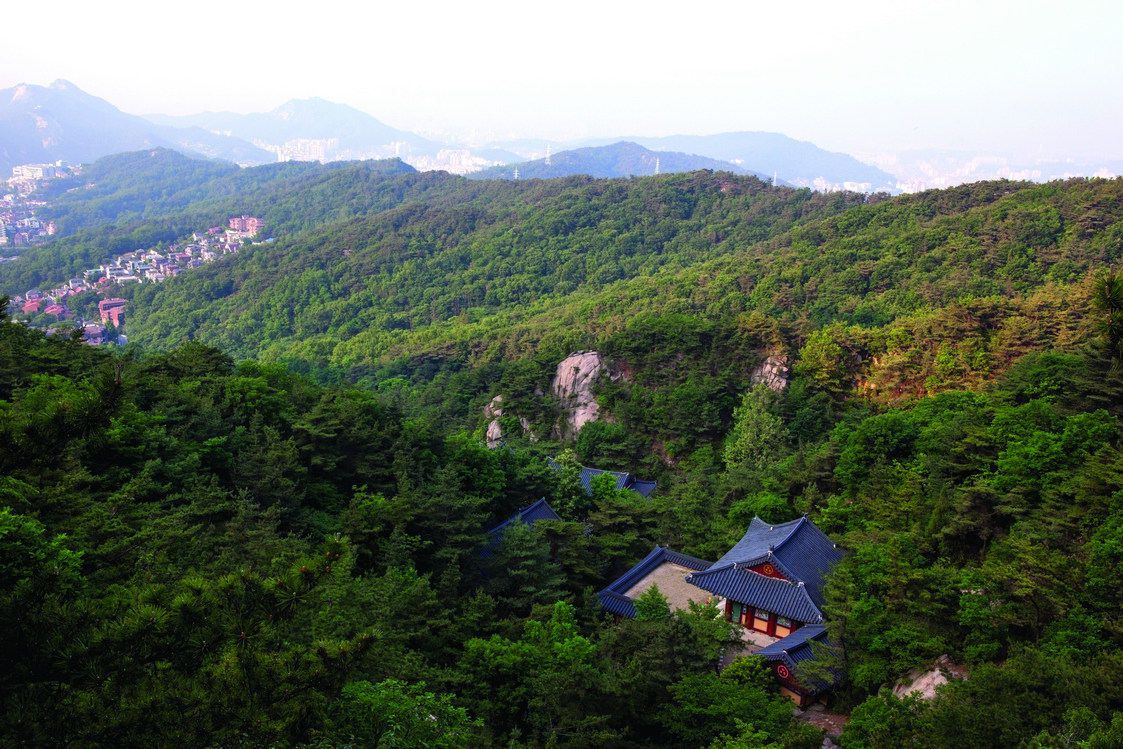

- Location within South Korea

Religion
- Affiliation: Buddhist

Location
- Location: Seoul
- Country: South Korea
- Interactive map of Geumseonsa
- Coordinates: 37.6201°N 126.9532°E

Architecture
- Completed: Before 1405

Geumseonsa (Korean: 금선사) is a Buddhist temple of the Jogye Order in Seoul, South Korea. Believed to have been established before 1405, it is located in 196-1 Gugi-dong in the Jongno District area of the city, in Bukhansan National Park.

== See also ==
- List of Buddhist temples in Seoul
