= Myogaksa =

Buddhist temple in Seoul, South Korea

- 묘각사
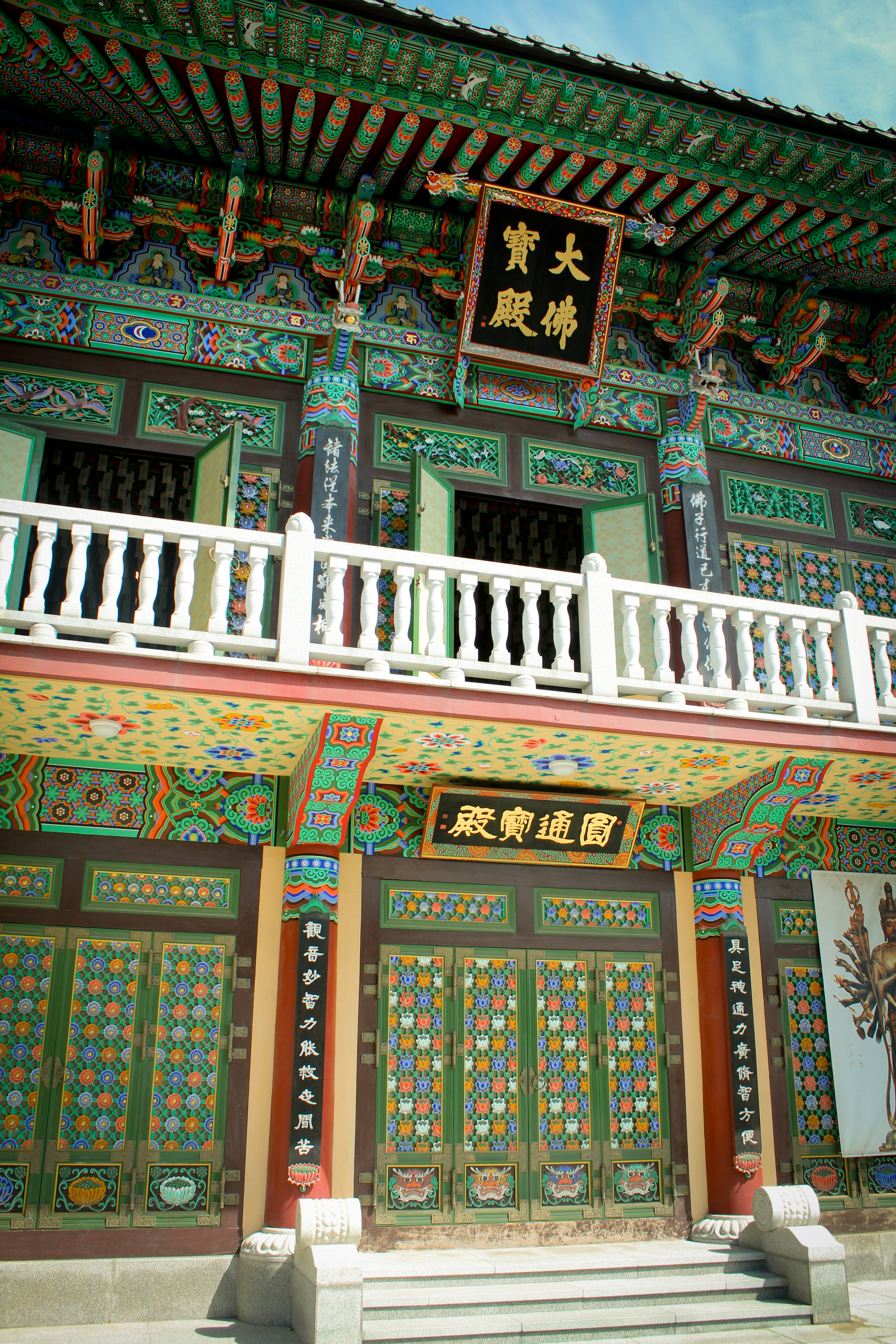
- View of Myogaksa in South Korea

- Location within South Korea

Religion
- Affiliation: Buddhism
- Sect: Guaneum Order

Location
- Location: 31, Jong-ro 63ga-gil, Jongno District, Seoul
- Country: South Korea
- Coordinates: 37°34′31.40″N 127°01′07.5″E

Myogaksa (Korean: 묘각사) is a Korean Buddhist temple in Jongno District, Seoul, South Korea. It is on the east side of the mountain Naksan. It houses the administrative headquarters of the Gwaneum Order of Korean Buddhism. It is located close to the Dongmangbong Peak, Naksan Park, Donggwanmyo Shrine and Dongdaemun Market.

== History ==
Myogaksa was established in May 1942 by Ven. Taeheo Hongseon in accordance with a geomantic prediction that Seoul residents would be at peace if a temple was constructed here. Based on a geomantic principle, Mt. Naksan, on which Myogaksa is located, corresponds to a land formation known as "blue dragon on the left" in regards to Seoul, and Myogaksa stands on the edge of the mountain.

Although Myogaksa is situated on a rather small piece of land in a residential district, its structural integrity is evident in the layout of such structures as Daebulbojeon, Wontongbojeon, Nakga Seon Center, Seokguram, Mountain God Shrine and an Avalokitesvara image carved into the mountain cliff.

== Cultural properties ==
- Treasure No. 799 five-story stone pagoda
- Treasure No. 800 Yeongsanjeon hall
- Treasure No. 801 Daewungjeon hall (main Buddha hall)
- Treasure No. 802 Daegwangbojeon hall (great light)
- Treasure No. 1260 hanging painting of Sakyamuni Buddha
- South Chungcheong Tangible Cultural Property No. 20 bronze incense burner inlaid with silver
- South Chungcheong Tangible Cultural Property No. 62 dong jong (dharma bell)
- South Chungcheong Tangible Cultural Property No. 126 woodblock of last will of a civil officer pojeo and his third son's collection of literary works
- South Chungcheong Tangible Cultural Property No. 135 shimgumdang (building where monastics resided) and gobang (warehouse)
- South Chungcheong Tangible Cultural Property No. 181 beom jong in pogyodang (dharma propagation building)
- South Chungcheong Tangible Cultural Property No. 185 wooden sakyamuni Buddha triad in the main Buddha hall
- South Chungcheong Tangible Cultural Property No. 191 hanging Buddhist painting for the Young-san religious service
- South Chungcheong Folklore Cultural Property No. 14 palankeen of King Sejo
- South Chungcheong Cultural Property No. 62 Cheongwangmun gate (gate for the heavenly king)
- South Chungcheong Cultural Property No. 63 Guksadang shrine
- South Chungcheong Cultural Property No. 64 Myoungbujeon hall (hall of Ksitigarbah Bodhisattva)
- South Chungcheong Cultural Property No. 65 Eunginjeon hall (hall of the kings of the hells)
- South Chungcheong Cultural Property No. 66 Haetalmun (gate of enlightenment)

== Programs ==
Designated a temple specializing in Temple Stay programs since the 2002 World Cup, it preserves the oldest tradition of Temple Stay programs. The program provides participants the opportunity to experience the life of Buddhist practitioners and learn the various aspects of the Korean Buddhist culture and history through stories told by monks. The temple stay program has been operating since 2002.

Myogaksa offers two kinds of temple stay programs. The first option is an overnight program, where participants spend 2 days and 1 night experience life as a Buddhist practitioner. The second program is a daylong cultural program called "Laying Down My Mind." Depending on age, personal preference, and the time participants would like to spend at the temple, there are a variety of program activities available for everyone, such as:

- 108 Yeomju (prayer beads) making: Participants experience an opportunity to make a rosary, during which they will thread 108 beads one by one followed by one prostration for each threading.
- Experience of bell-striking: Participants join the temple bell striking ceremony in the quiet and still hours of dawn and evening.
- Dawn trekking at Naksan Park: To promote reflection on oneself, participants are given the opportunity to take a short hike behind the Mountain Spirit shrine to turn their attention within.
- Dado (tea ceremony): Participants are able to feel the gratitude and preciousness of having tea and a little fruit after finishing the group work and breakfast. The tea ceremony has a difficult and complex decorum and helps enable participants to experience the non-duality of tea and Seon (Zen), namely one of the supreme stages of Buddhist practice.
- Gongyang (temple's mealing)
- Meditation
- Predawn Buddhist service

== Gallery ==
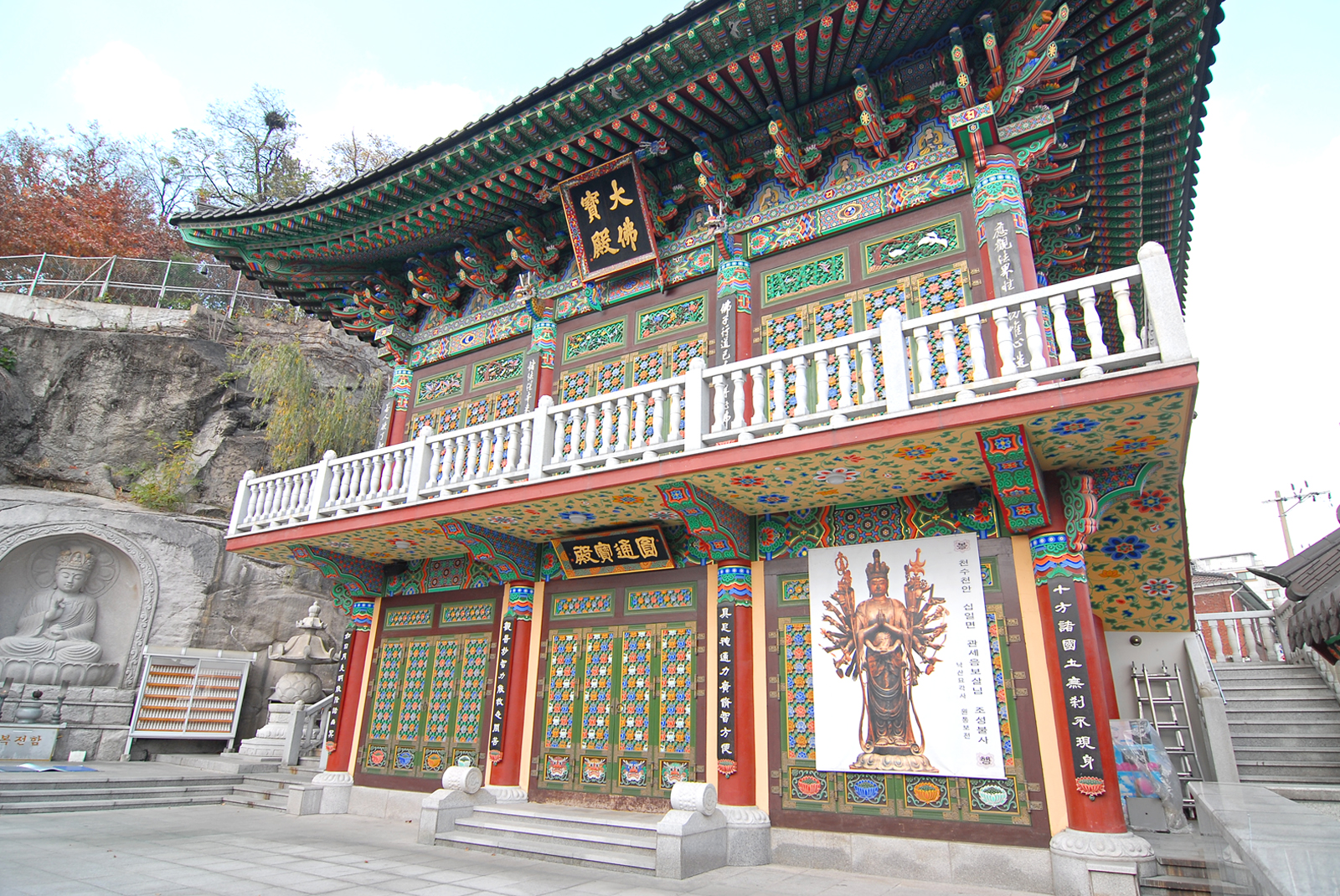

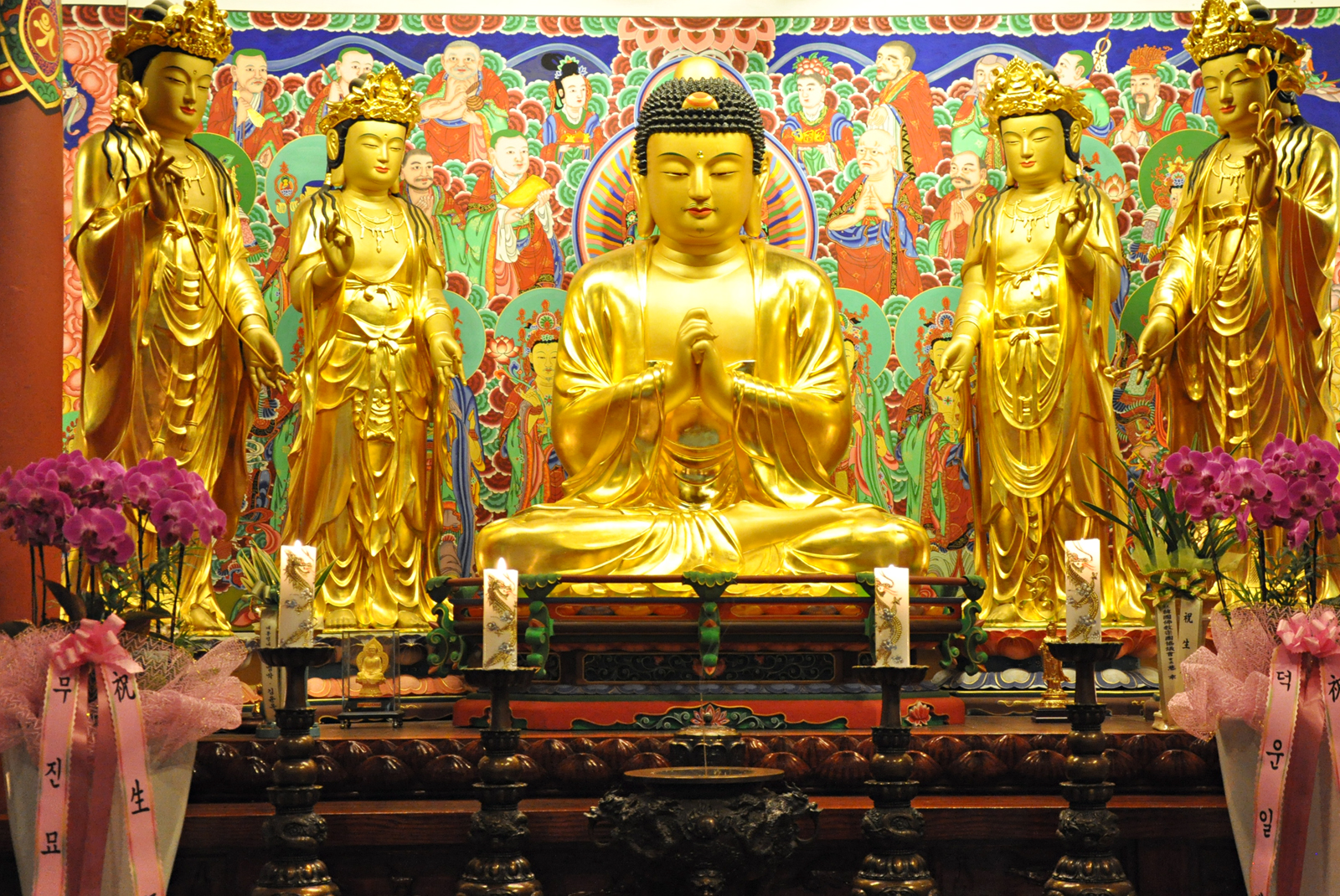

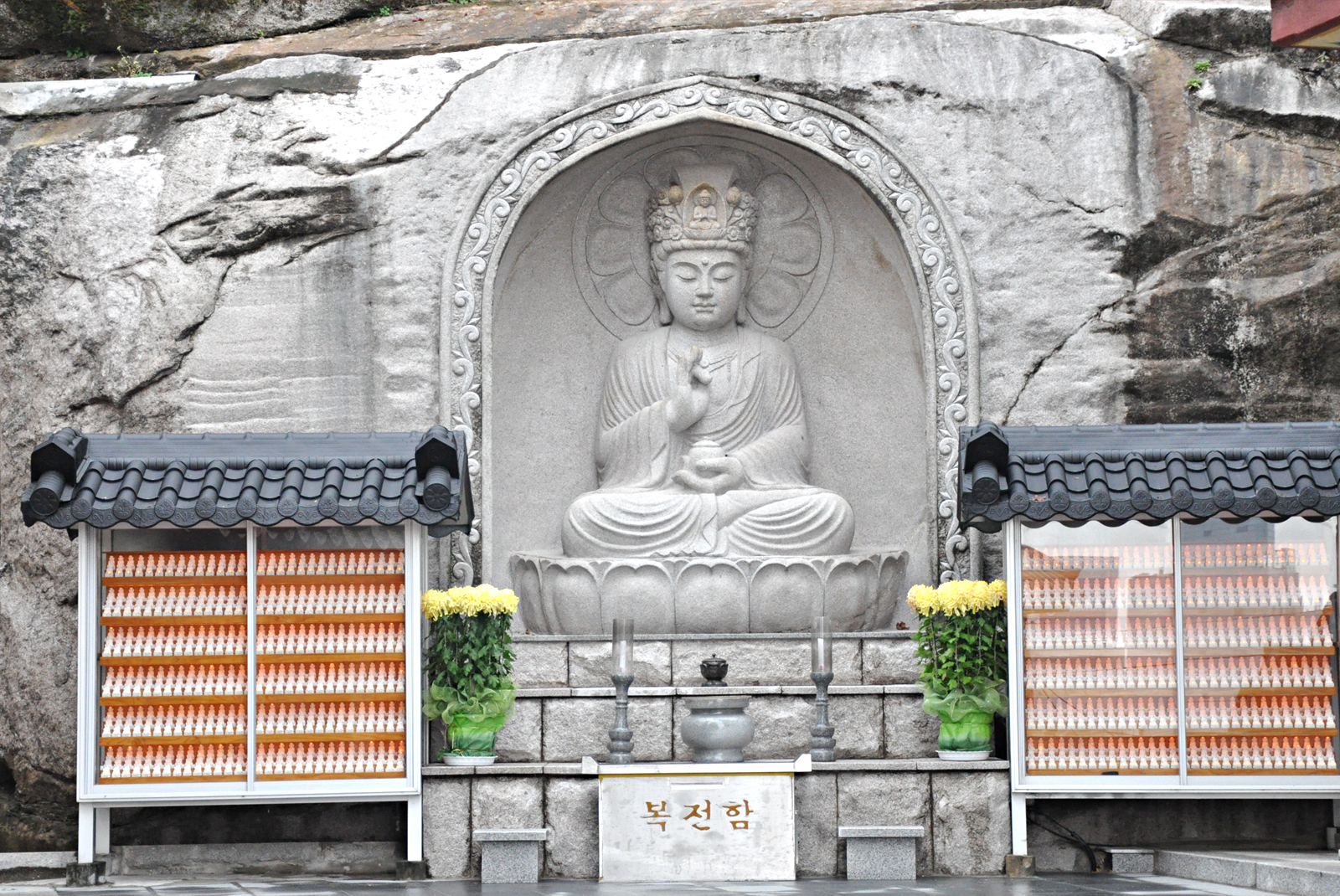

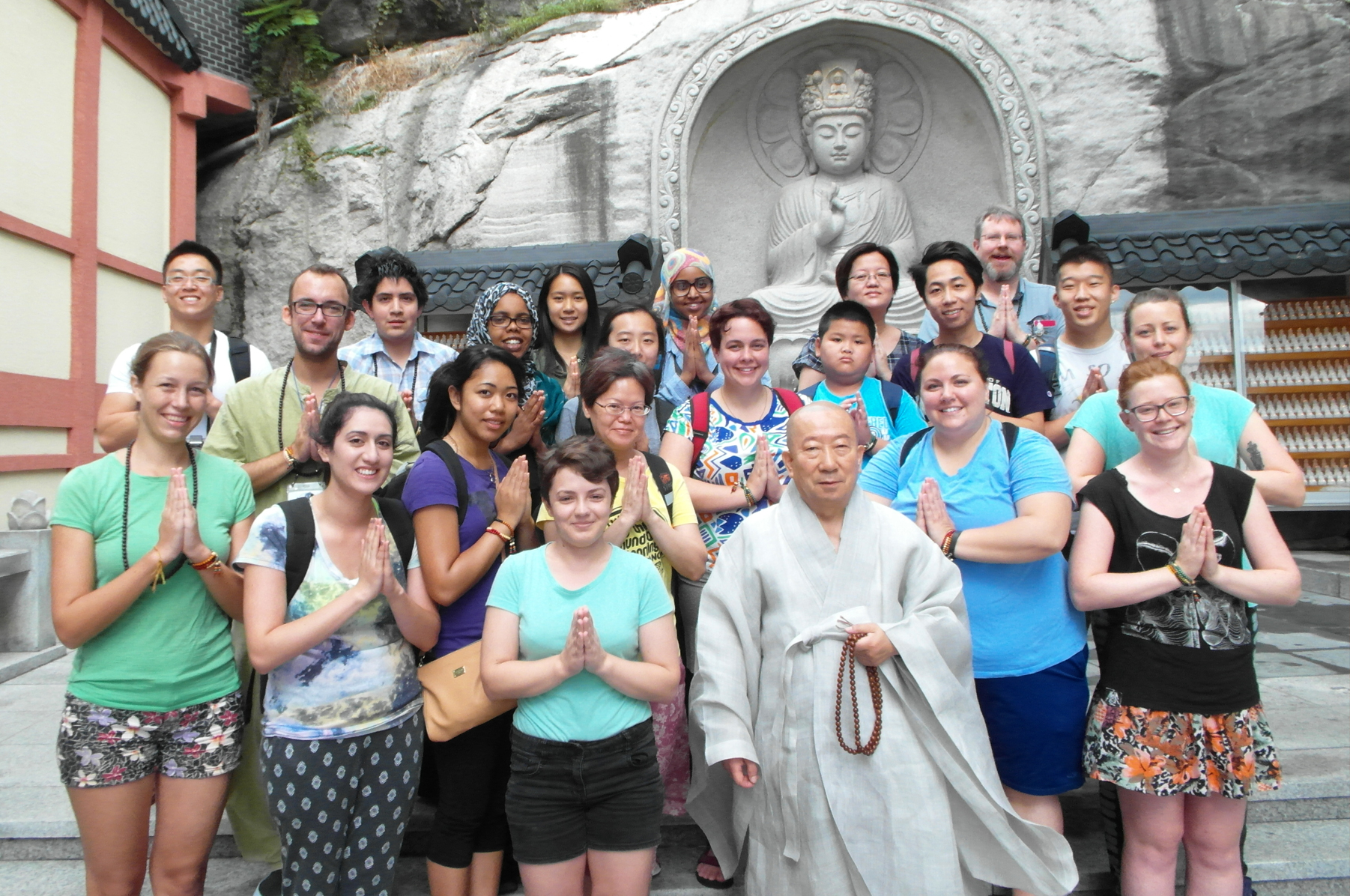

== See also ==
- Korean Buddhist temples
- List of Buddhist temples in Seoul
