= Daeseongsa =

Buddhist temple in Seoul, South Korea

Daeseongsa (Korean: 대성사) is a Buddhist temple of the Jogye Order in Seoul, South Korea. It is located at San 140-2 Seocho-dong, Seocho District.

== See also ==
- List of Buddhist temples in Seoul
