= Hongji-dong =

Coordinates: 37°36′N 126°58′E

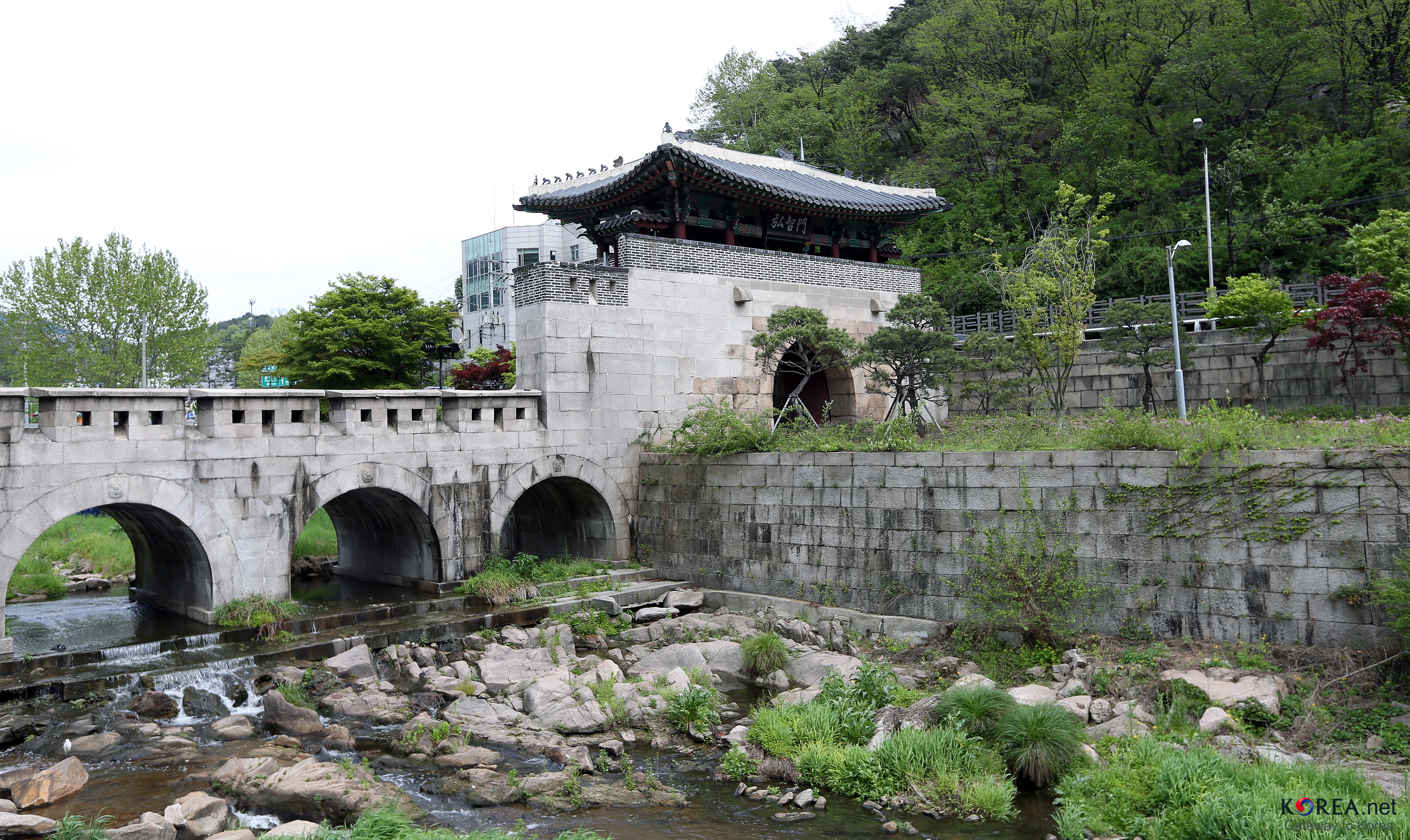
- Hongjimun Gate and Tangchundaeseong Fortress
- Interactive map of Hongji-dong
- Country: South Korea

Area
  - Total: 0.37 km^{2} (0.14 sq mi)

Korean name
- Hangul: 홍지동
- Hanja: 弘智洞
- RR: Hongji-dong
- MR: Hongji-dong

Hongji-dong (Korean: 홍지동) is a dong (neighborhood) of Jongno District, Seoul, South Korea. It is a legal dong (법정동 法定洞) administered under its administrative dong (행정동 行政洞), Buam-dong.

== See also ==
- Administrative divisions of South Korea
