= Bongeunsa =

Buddhist temple in Seoul, South Korea

- 봉은사
- Mireuk Daebul statue of the bodhisattva Maitreya at Bongeunsa (2022)

Religion
- Affiliation: Jogye Order of Korean Buddhism

Location
- Location: Samseong-dong, Gangnam District, Seoul
- Country: South Korea
- Interactive map of Bongeunsa
- Coordinates: 37°30′56″N 127°03′26″E

Architecture
- Type: temple
- Style: Korean Buddhist temples
- Founder: Yeonhoeguksa (연회국사)
- Established: 794 (Silla)

Website
- Bongeunsa

Korean name
- Hangul: 봉은사
- Hanja: 奉恩寺
- RR: Bongeunsa
- MR: Pongŭnsa

Bongeunsa (Korean: 봉은사; Hanja: 奉恩寺) is a Korean Buddhist temple located in Samseong-dong, Gangnam District, Seoul, South Korea. It was founded in 794 during the reign of King Wonseong by State Preceptor Yeonhoe (연회; 緣會), then the highest ranking monk of Silla. The temple was originally named Gyeonseongsa (견성사; 見性寺). It is located on the slope of Sudo Mountain, across the street from the COEX Mall.

== History ==
=== Joseon Dynasty ===
During the Joseon period, Buddhism in Korea was severely suppressed. However, The temple began to be known as Bongeunsa when it was reconstructed in 1498 under the patronage of Queen Jeonghyeon, a Joseon Queen. The term Bongeunsa means the act of honoring the king, which here can be understood as taking the form of praying for king Seongjong's eternal life.

With the support of Queen Munjeong, who revived Buddhism in Korea for a short time in the mid-16th century, it became the main temple of the Korean Seon (Chan) sect of Buddhism from 1551 through 1936. Monk Bou was appointed head of the temple in 1548 by Queen Munjeong but was killed soon afterward as the anti-Buddhist factions regained dominance in Korea towards the end of Queen Munjeong's rule. From 1552 to 1564, Bongeunsa was the center of the Buddhist National Exam.

=== Korean Empire to Japanese occupation ===
Bongeunsa was made one of the Korean Empire's 14 major temples in 1902. During the Japanese occupation, the temple became the headquarters of 80 smaller Buddhist temples around Seoul. In 1922 and 1929, Head Monk Cheongho saved over 700 people from drowning in the Han River, an act that inspired a monument of recognition. After colonial rule, Bongeunsa became subordinate to the Jogye Order, the largest Buddhist sect in Korea.

=== Destruction and reconstruction ===
A fire in 1939 destroyed most of the buildings, and other parts of the temple were destroyed during the Korean War. Fortunately, Panjeon (판전; 板殿), one of the very few halls which escaped destruction during the Korean War, continues to hold the woodblock carvings of the Flower Garland Sutra created in 1855 by Monk Yeonggi. The temple has undergone many repairs and renovations and is now once again a large, thriving complex. The reconstruction efforts are ongoing even today.

== Tourism ==
The temple is a notable tourist destination, offering a Temple Stay program in which visitors can experience the life of a monk. Participants can experience various traditions linked with the temple's history. They can experience baru gongyang (발우 공양; 鉢盂供養), a Buddhist temple meal using a baru (발우; 鉢盂), which is a rice bowl used by monks.

The area on the main street from the temple to Park Hyatt Hotel has a large concentration of vegetarian and other upscale restaurants that serve Korean cuisine with a modern twist.

== Gallery ==
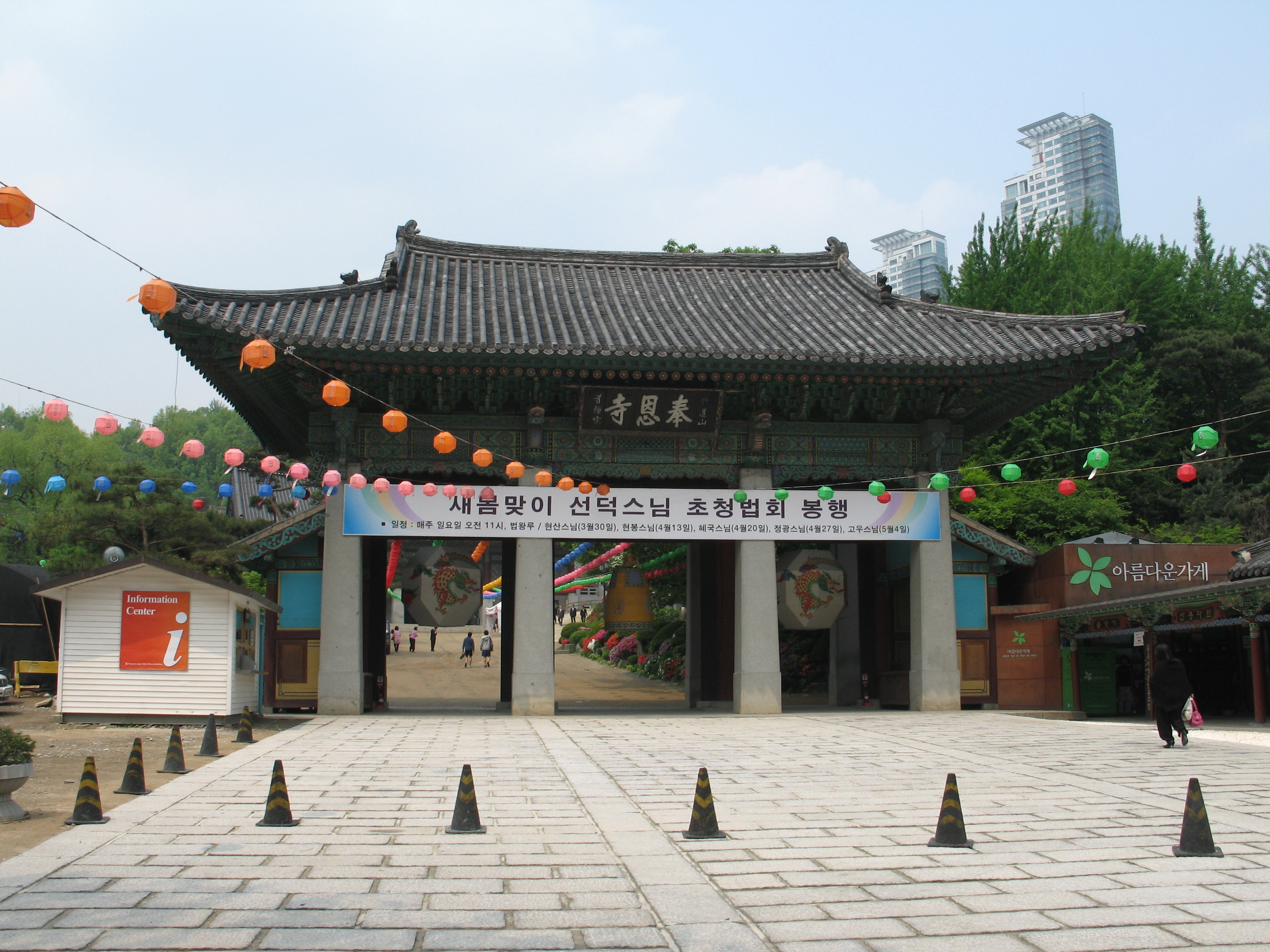

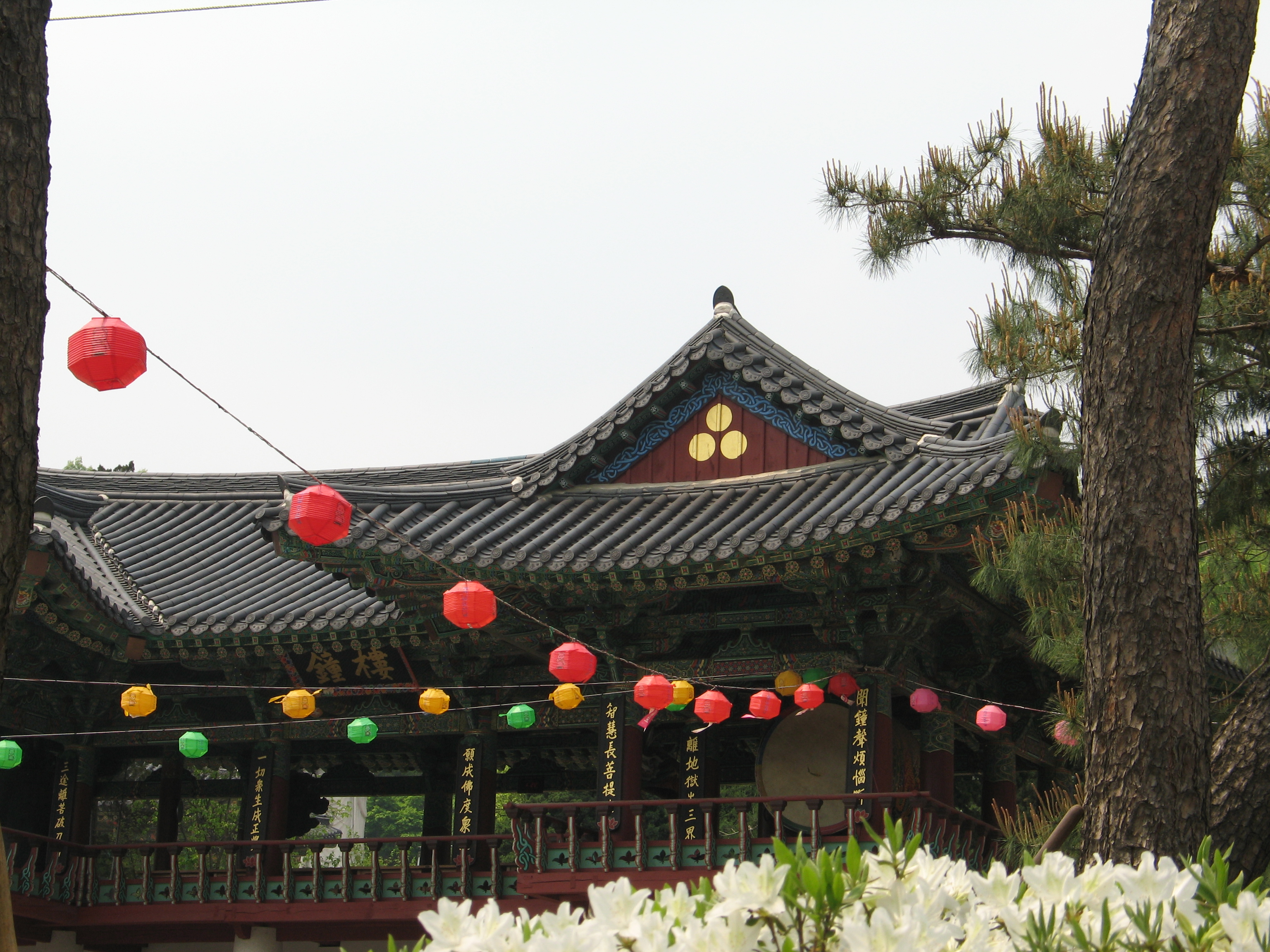

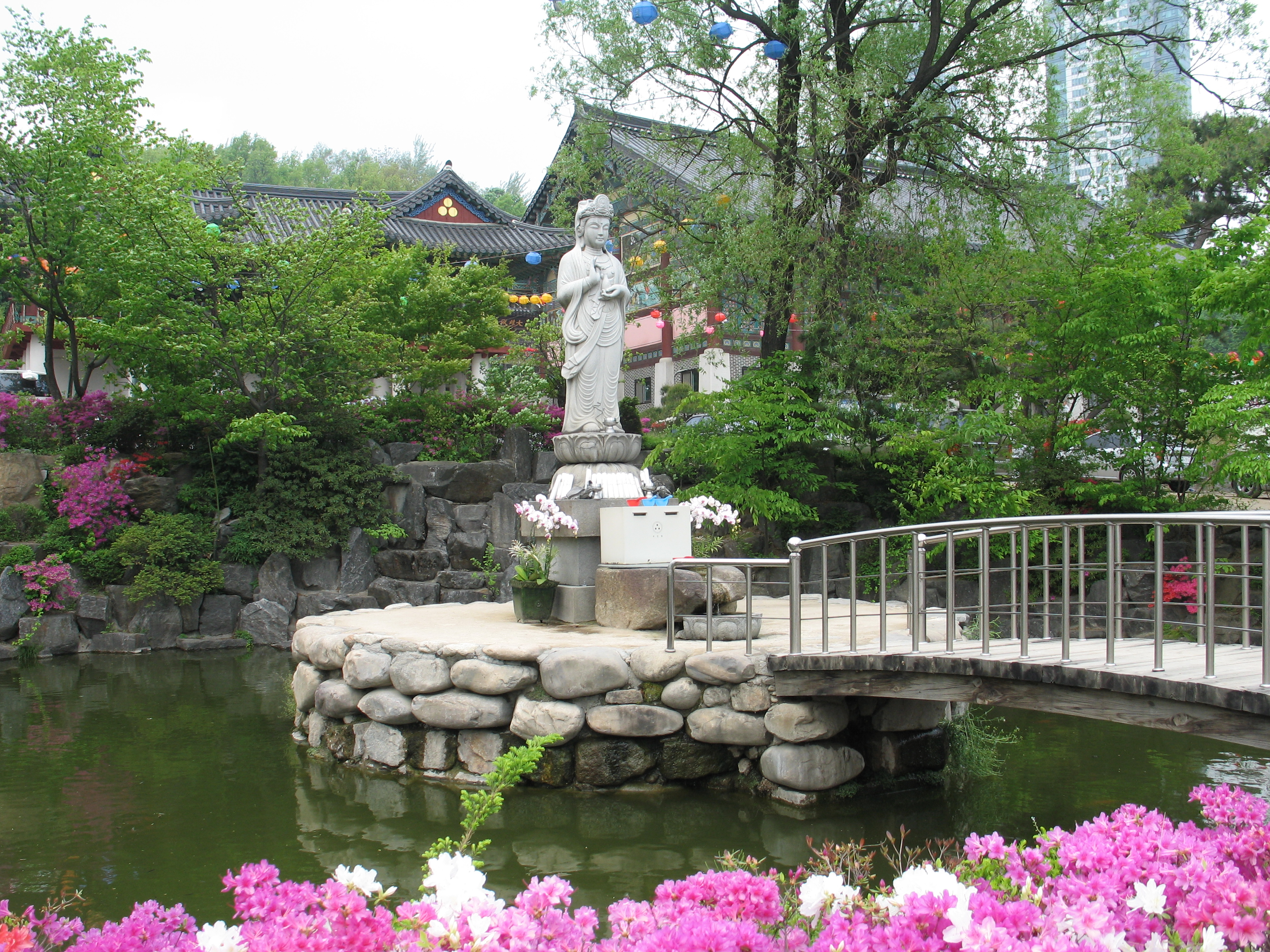

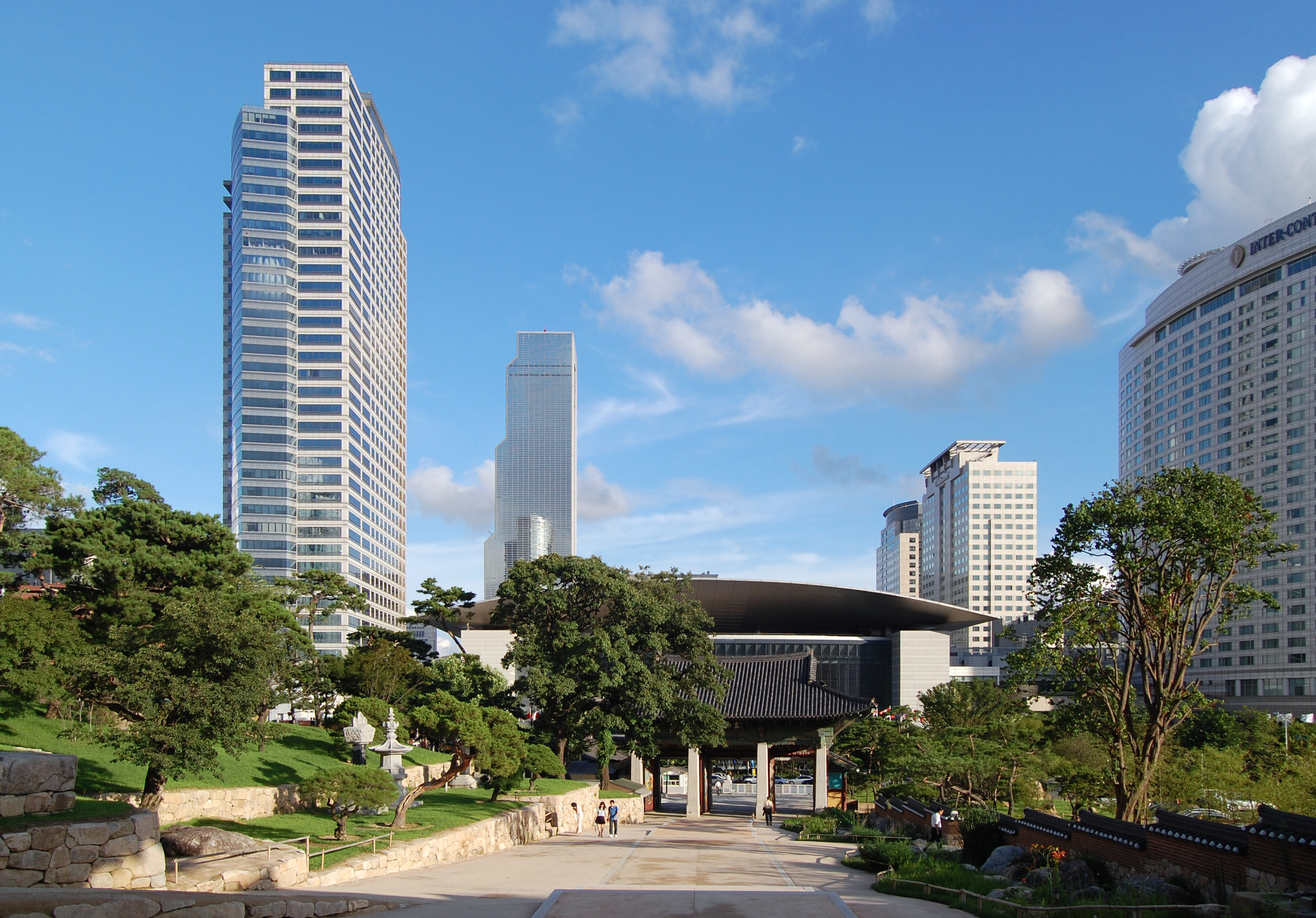

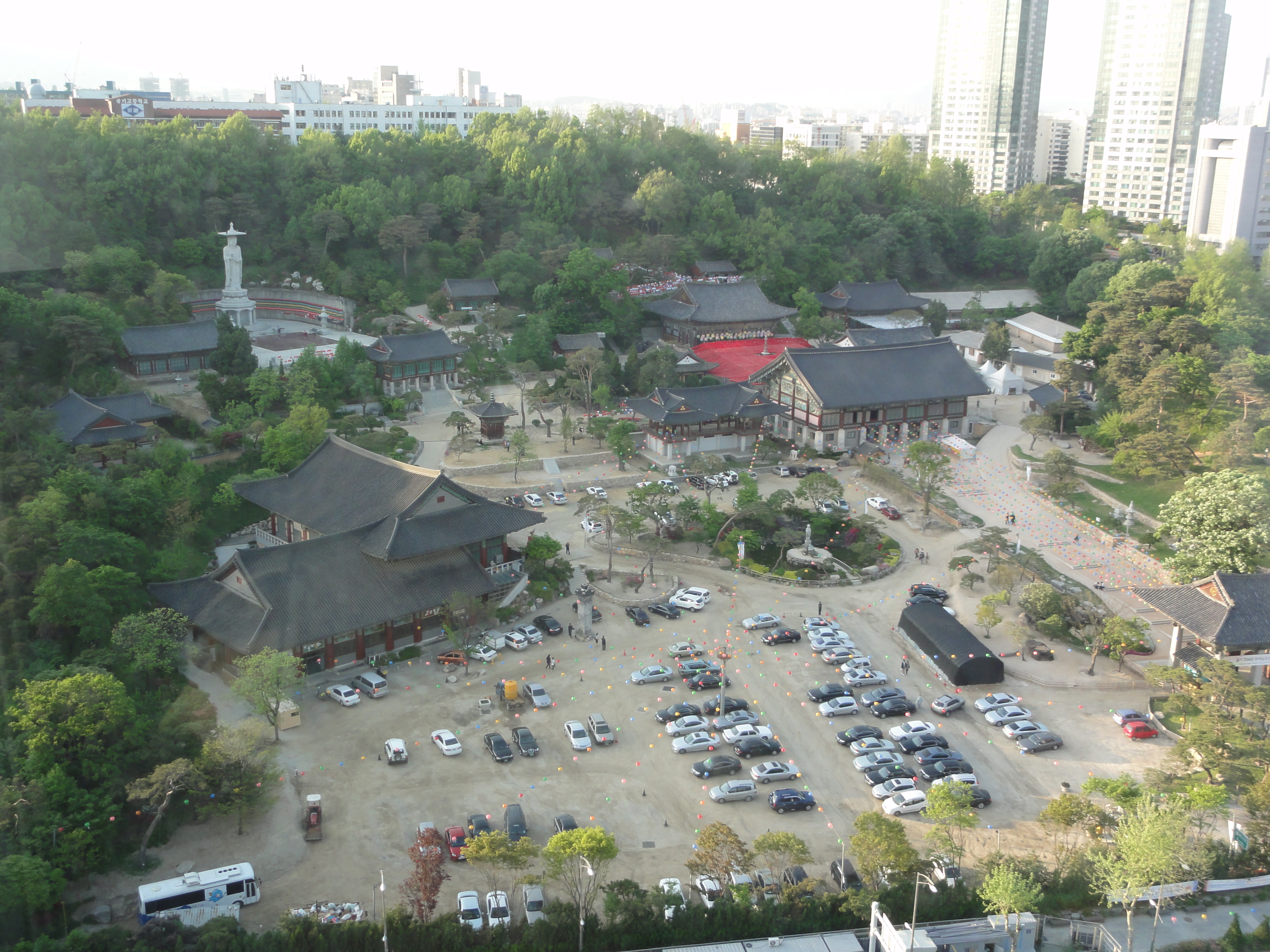

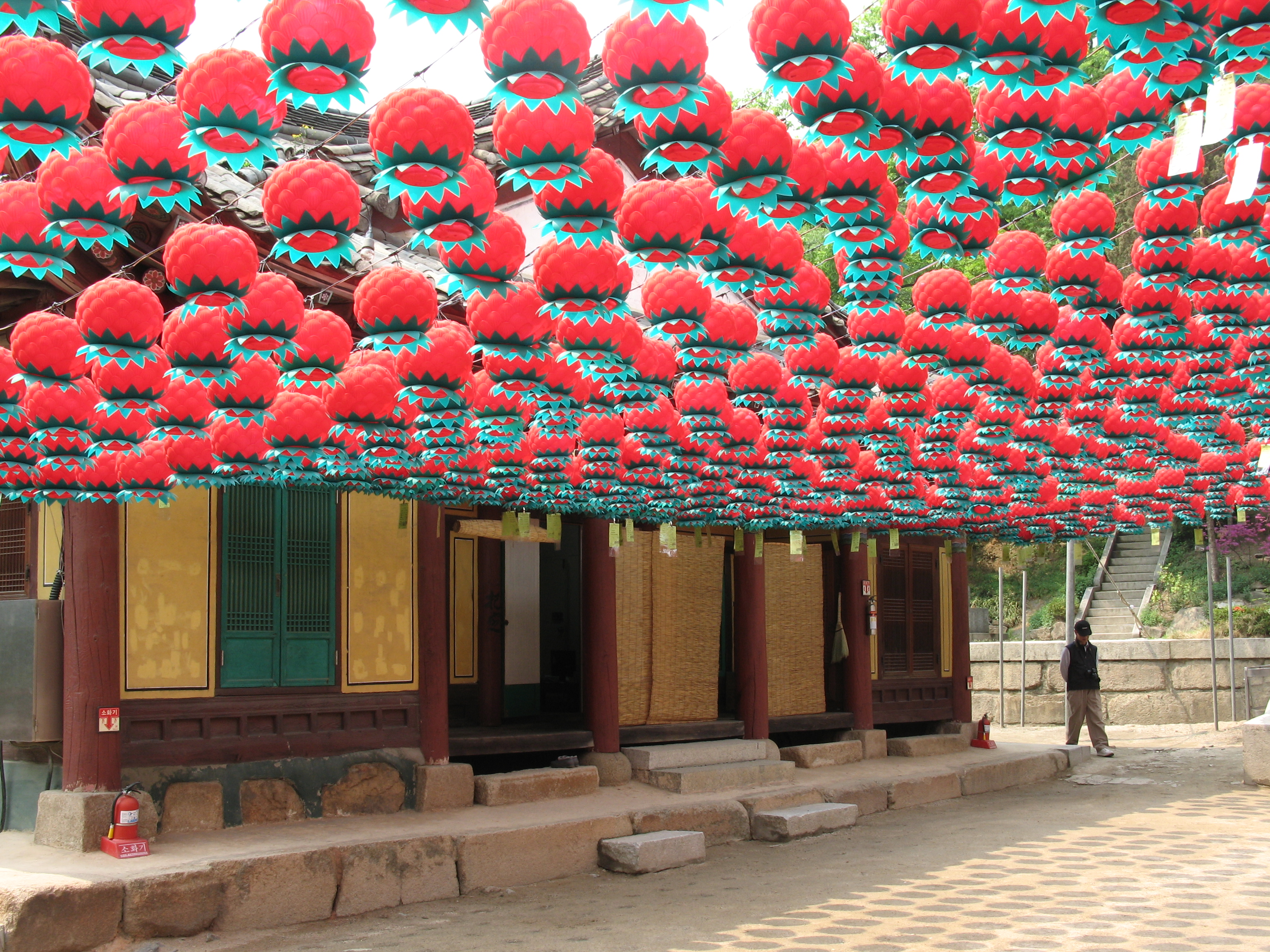

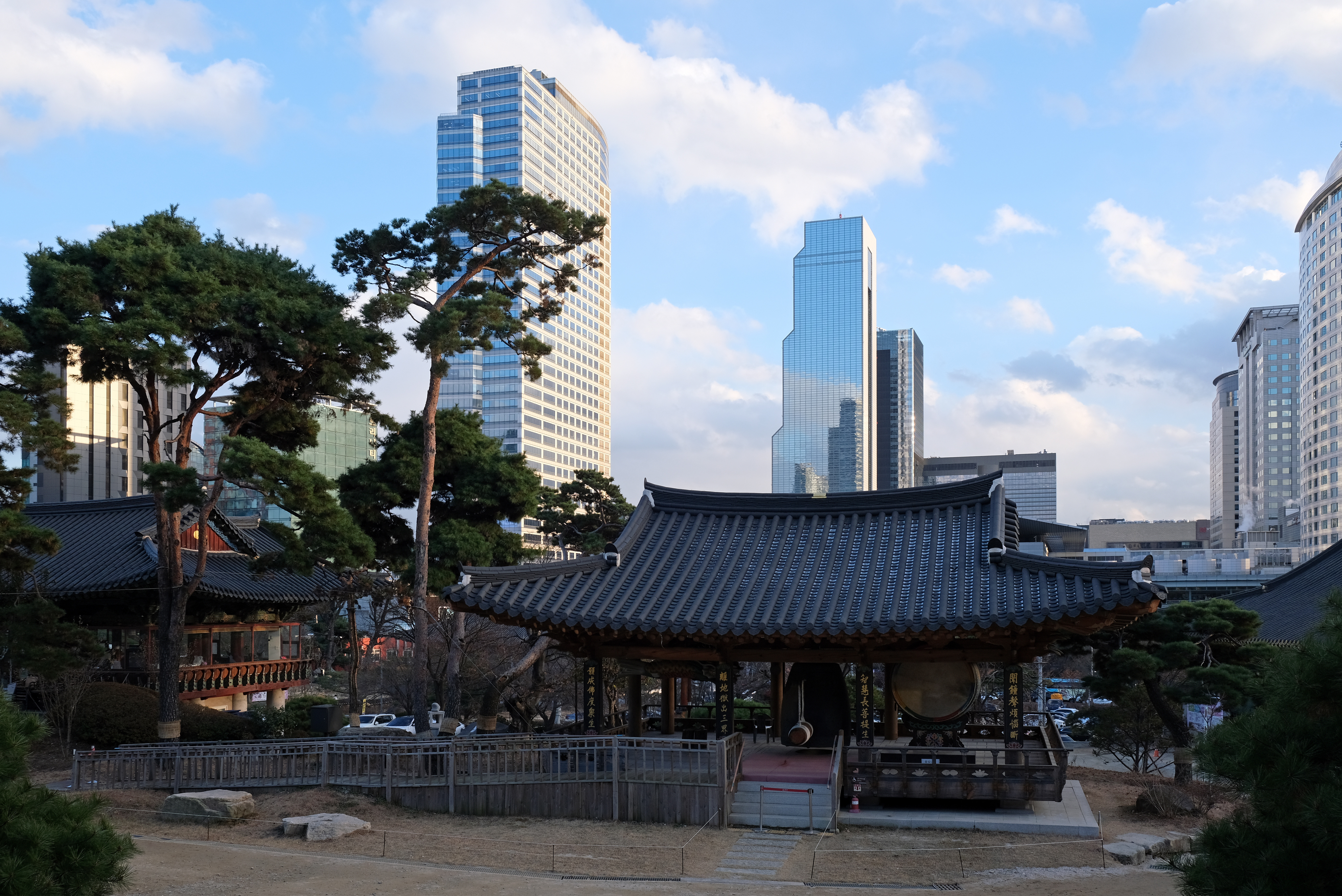

== See also ==
- List of Buddhist temples in Seoul
- Korean Buddhism
- Korean architecture
- Korean Buddhist temples
- Japanese occupation of Korea
