= Muak-dong =

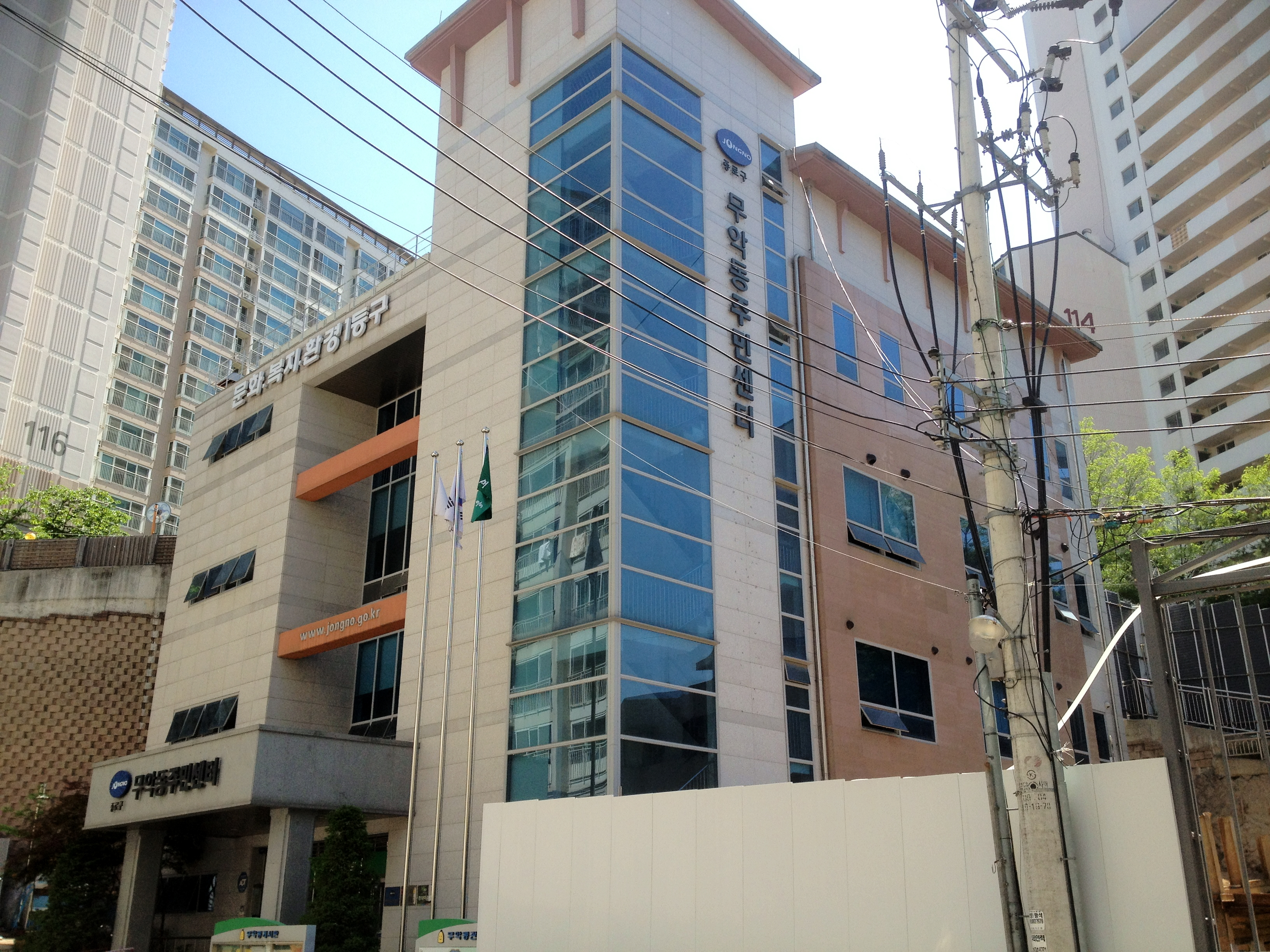
- Muak-dong Community Service Center (Jongno District)
- Interactive map of Muak-dong
- Coordinates: 37°34′30″N 126°57′29″E
- Country: South Korea

Area
  - Total: 0.36 km^{2} (0.14 sq mi)

Population (2001)
  - Total: 9,179
  - Density: 25,000/km^{2} (66,000/sq mi)

Korean name
- Hangul: 무악동
- Hanja: 毋岳洞
- RR: Muak-dong
- MR: Muak-tong

Muak-dong (Korean: 무악동) is a dong (neighbourhood) of Jongno District, Seoul, South Korea.

== Overview ==
Naegak-dong is an administrative district located in the southwestern part of Jongno District. It borders Cheongun Hyoja-dong, Sajik-dong, and Gyeongnam-dong in the same Jongno District district in order from northeast to southeast, but otherwise borders Seodaemun District.

== See also ==
- Administrative divisions of South Korea
