= Heukseok-dong =

Neighborhood in Seoul, South Korea

Coordinates: 35°11′N 126°49′E

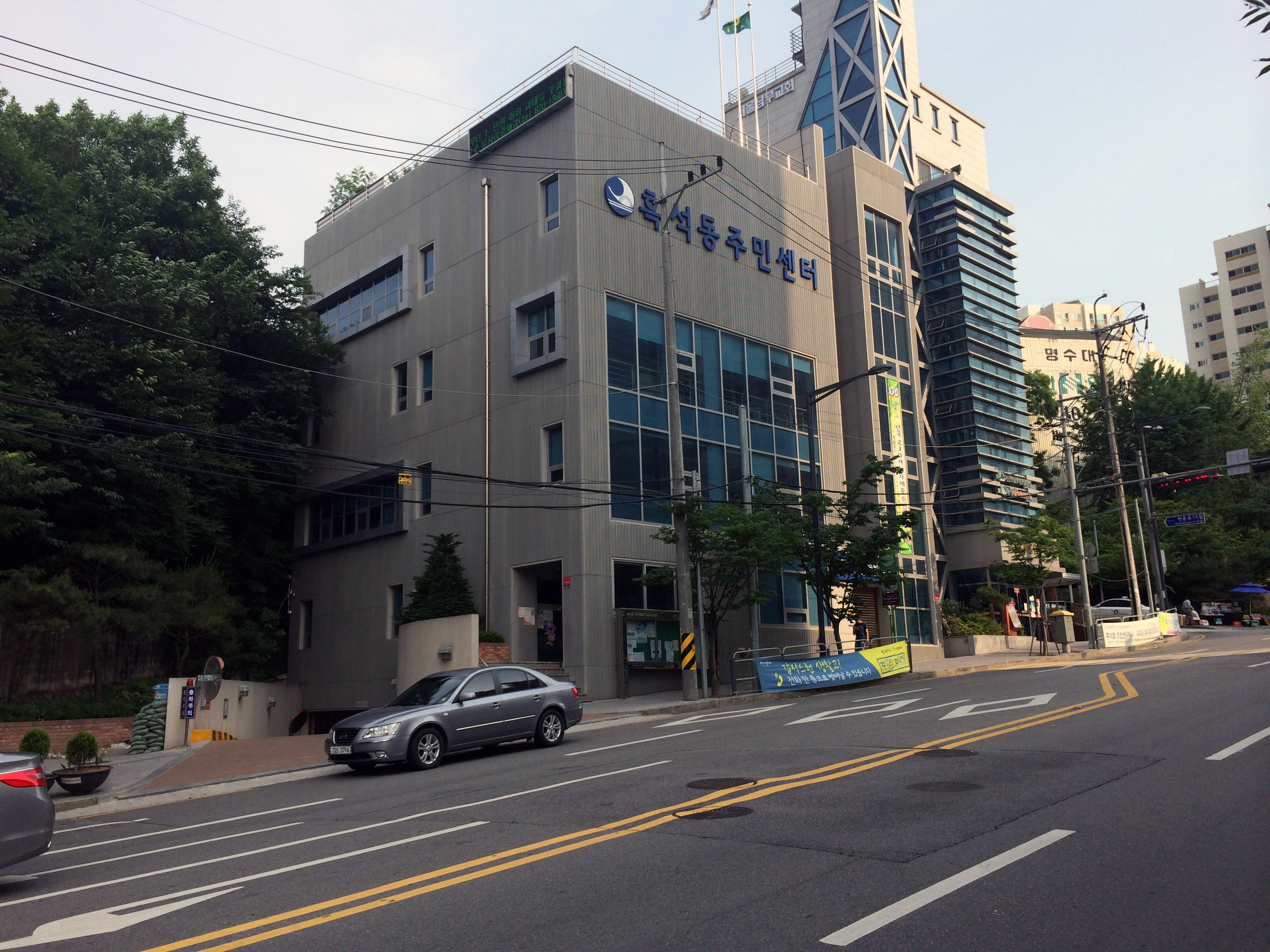
- Heukseok-dong Community Service Center
- Interactive map of Heukseok-dong
- Country: South Korea

Area
  - Total: 1.68 km^{2} (0.65 sq mi)

Population (2001)
  - Total: 42,268
  - Density: 25,160/km^{2} (65,200/sq mi)

Korean name
- Hangul: 흑석동
- Hanja: 黑石洞
- RR: Heukseok-dong
- MR: Hŭksŏk-tong

Heukseok-dong (Korean: 흑석동) is a dong (neighborhood) of Dongjak District, Seoul, South Korea.

== See also ==
- Administrative divisions of South Korea
