= Namhyeon-dong =

Neighbourhood in Seoul, South Korea

Coordinates: 37°28′N 126°59′E

- Interactive map of Namhyeon-dong
- Country: South Korea

Area
  - Total: 3.27 km^{2} (1.26 sq mi)

Population (2001)
  - Total: 17,228
  - Density: 5,268.5/km^{2} (13,645/sq mi)

Korean name
- Hangul: 남현동
- Hanja: 南峴洞
- RR: Namhyeon-dong
- MR: Namhyŏn-dong

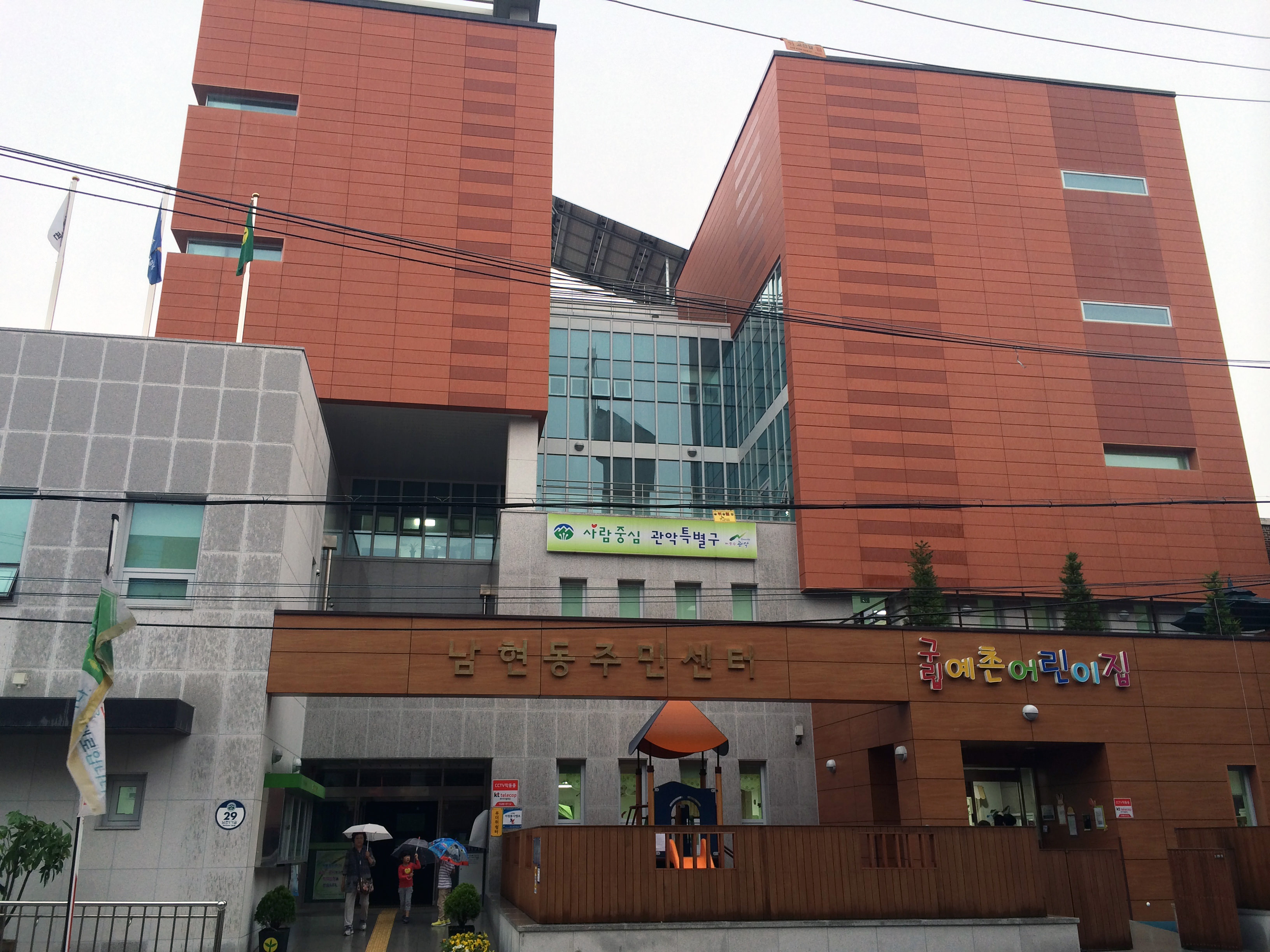
Namhyeon-dong Community Service Center

Namhyeon-dong (Korean: 남현동) is a statutory division of Gwanak District, Seoul, South Korea. Its name means "southern mountain pass". It received this name because it was the location of the main mountain pass over Gwanaksan in the past.

== Points of interest ==
- Seoul Museum of Art, South Branch (SeMA Nam-Seoul)

== See also ==
- Administrative divisions of South Korea
