= Gugi-dong =

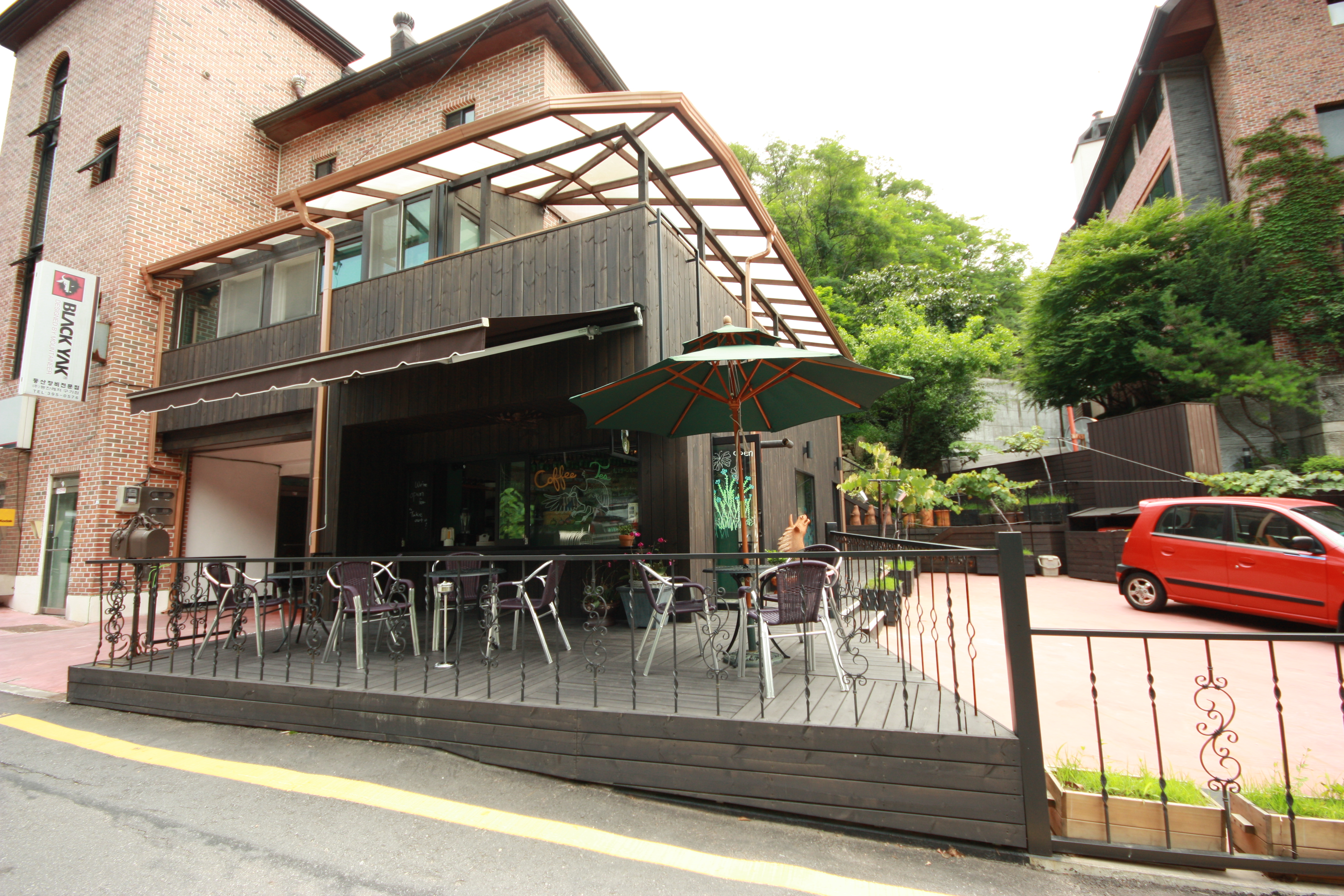
- A commercial building in Gugi-dong, near Bukhansan
- Interactive map of Gugi-dong
- Country: South Korea

Area
  - Total: 3.75 km^{2} (1.45 sq mi)

Korean name
- Hangul: 구기동
- Hanja: 舊基洞
- RR: Gugi-dong
- MR: Kugi-dong

Gugi-dong (Korean: 구기동) is a dong (neighborhood) of Jongno District, Seoul, South Korea. It is a legal dong (법정동 法定洞) administered under its administrative dong (행정동 行政洞), Pyeongchang-dong.

== Attractions ==
Bukhansan National Park includes several hiking trails. Seungasa Temple, including the Gugi-dong Seated Buddha Carving (북한산 구기동 마애여래좌상), 5 meters tall, carved on granite rock.

Dating to the early Goryeo period, the carving was designed as South Korea's Treasure No. 215 on 21 January 1963.

== Education ==
Lycée International Xavier is located in this dong. It moved there from Hyehwa-dong in May 2005.

== See also ==
- Administrative divisions of South Korea
