= Dobong-dong =

Coordinates: 37.6795°N 127.0426°E

- Neighborhood
- Country: South Korea

Area
  - Total: 9.55 km^{2} (3.69 sq mi)

Population (2010)
  - Total: 56,990
  - Density: 5,970/km^{2} (15,500/sq mi)
- Postal code: 132-010
- Postal code: 132-010

Korean name
- Hangul: 도봉동
- Hanja: 道峰洞
- RR: Dobong-dong
- MR: Tobong-dong

Dobong-dong (Korean: 도봉동) is a dong (neighborhood) of Dobong District, Seoul, South Korea. The dong is one of the four located in the Dobong District. According to the Köppen–Geiger climate classification system, the region is Dwa, or a humid continental climate. The average temperature is 11.1 °C and approximately 147.5 cm of precipitation falls annually. The postal code for Dobong-dong is 132-010. The region is also referred to as Tobong-dong.

== Overview ==
The name Dobong originates from its location at the foot of Dobongsan, a prominent mountain in Seoul. On April 1, 1914, during the Japanese colonial period, administrative districts were reorganized. As part of this process, several villages located beneath Dobongsan—such as Darakwon, Seowonmal, and Musuul—were merged and collectively named Dobong-ri, marking the beginning of the use of the name Dobong for the area.

The village of Darakwon was also known as Nuwon (樓院). Historically, this area encompassed the southern part of present-day Howon-dong in Uijeongbu (then Nuwon-ri, Dunya-myeon, Yangju-gun, Gyeonggi-do) and parts of modern-day Dobong-dong (then Sangnuwon-ri, Haedeungchon-myeon, Yangju-gun). Before the reign of King Sunjo of the Joseon Dynasty, the area was known as Nuwon-ri, and it is believed that it was later subdivided into Nuwon-ri and Sangnuwon-ri.

== In popular culture ==
Strong Girl Bong-soon, one of the highest rated Korean dramas in cable television, takes place here. The main character's name, Do Bong-soon (of Dobong-dong, Dobong District), is a play on words on the region.

== See also ==
- Administrative divisions of South Korea
