= Donam-dong =

Neighborhood in Seoul, South Korea

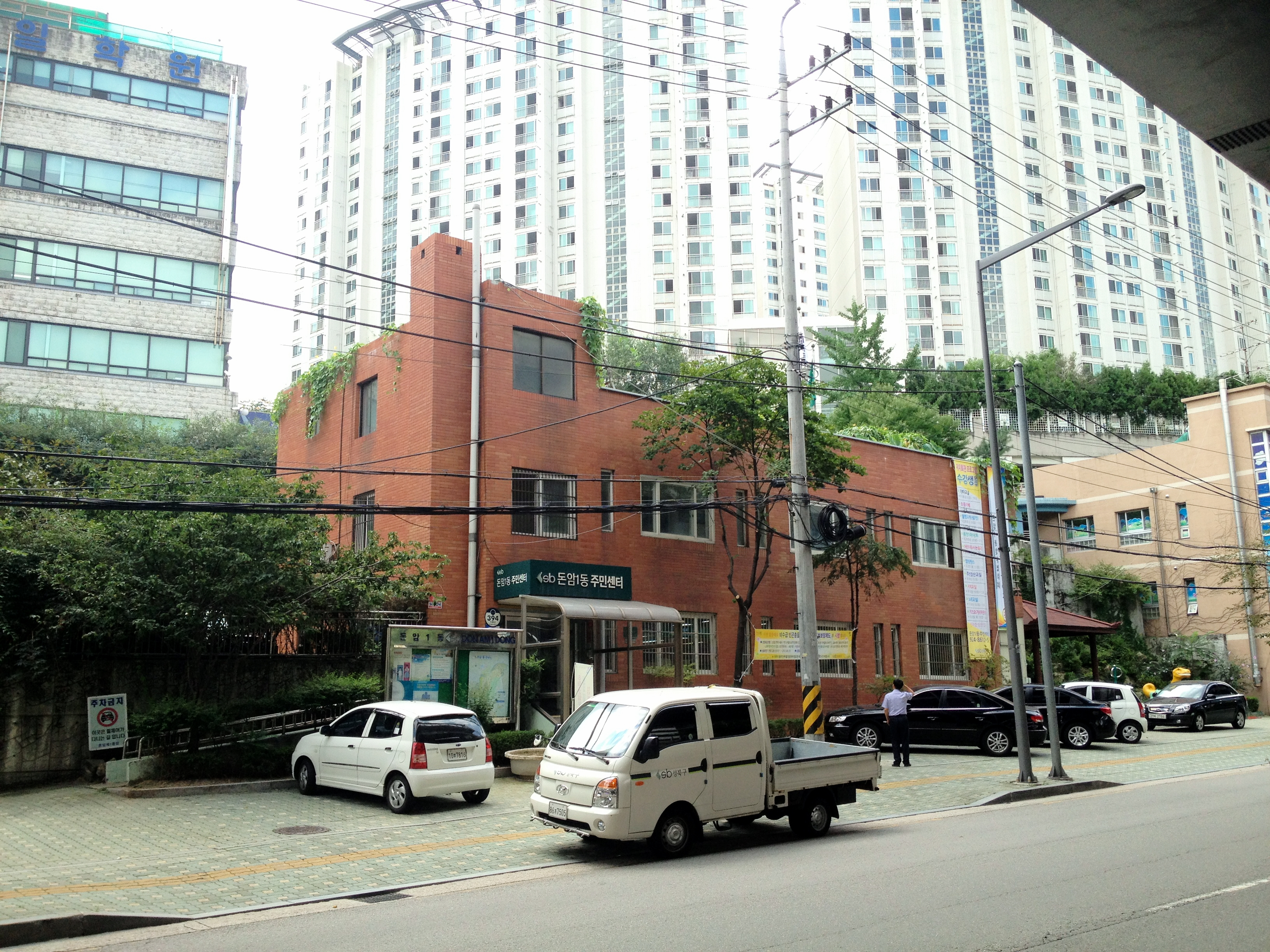
- Donam 1-dong Community Service Center (Seongbuk-gu)
- Country: South Korea

Area
  - Total: 0.91 km^{2} (0.35 sq mi)

Population (2001)
  - Total: 30,065
  - Density: 33,000/km^{2} (86,000/sq mi)

Korean name
- Hangul: 돈암동
- Hanja: 敦岩洞
- RR: Donam-dong
- MR: Tonam-dong

Donam-dong (Korean: 돈암동) is a dong (neighborhood) of Seongbuk District, Seoul, South Korea.

== See also ==
- Administrative divisions of South Korea
