= Jeongneung-dong =

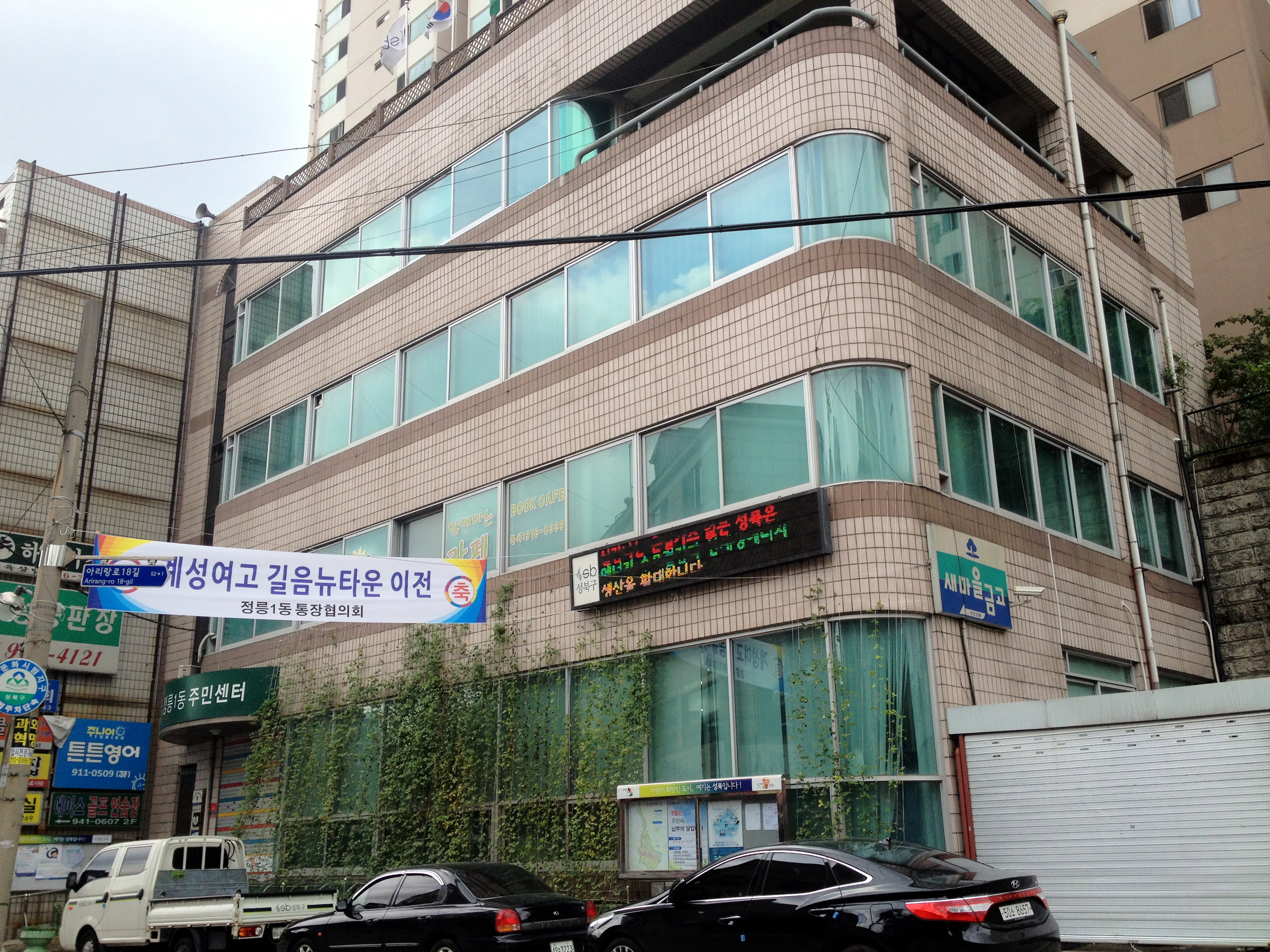
- Seongbuk Jeongneung 1-dong Community Service Center
- Country: South Korea

Korean name
- Hangul: 정릉동
- Hanja: 貞陵洞
- RR: Jeongneung-dong
- MR: Chŏngnŭng-dong

Jeongneung-dong (Korean: 정릉동) is a dong (neighbourhood) of Seongbuk District, Seoul, South Korea.

== See also ==
- Administrative divisions of South Korea
