= List of tourist attractions in South Korea =

This is a list of notable tourist attractions in South Korea. The list may include temples, museums, aquariums, landmarks, sports venues, markets, shopping districts, or other notable locations popular with tourists.

== 0–9 ==
- 63 Building
- 63 Seaworld

== A ==
- Anapji
- Apsan Park
- Art Center Nabi
- Artsonje Center

== B ==
- Bamseom
- Bangsan Market
- Bangudae Petroglyphs
- Bank of Korea Museum
- Banwolseong
- Bell of King Seongdeok
- Beomeosa
- Blue House
- Bomun Lake Resort
- Bongeunsa
- Bongmu Leports Park
- Bongsan Art Fair
- Bongwonsa
- Borisa Sitting Buddha
- Bosingak
- Bukchon Art Museum
- Bukchon Hanok Village
- Bukhansanseong
- Bukhansansillajinheungwangsunsubi
- Bulguksa Temple
- Busan Aquarium
- Busan Asiad Main Stadium
- Busan Cinema Center
- Busan Exhibition and Convention Center
- Busan Gudeok Stadium
- Busan Lotte World Tower
- Busan Marine Natural History Museum
- Busan Tower
- Busan Yachting Center

== C ==
- Changdeokgung
- Changgyeonggung
- Changuimun
- Cheonggyecheon
- Cheongnyeongpo
- Cheongpung Cultural Properties
- Cheongpyeongsa
- Children's Grand Park, Seoul
- Chiwoo Craft Museum
- Chohong Museum of Finance
- Chojun Textile & Quilt Art Museum
- Chung Young Yang Embroidery Museum
- COEX Aquarium
- COEX Mall
- Coreana Cosmetic Museum

== D ==
- Dabotap
- Daedeokje
- Daegaksa
- Daegu Baseball Stadium
- Daegu Civic Stadium
- Daegu Hyanggyo
- Daegu International Opera Festival
- Daegu National Museum
- Daegu Opera House
- Daegu Stadium
- Daegu Yangnyeongsi Festival
- Daejeon Museum of Art
- Daeseongsa
- Daesong Agricultural Market
- Daeunsan
- Daeyang Gallery and House
- Dalmasa
- Dalseong Park
- Demilitarized Zone (DMZ)
- Deoksugung
- Dongdaemun Market
- Donghak Peasant Revolution Museum
- Donghwasa
- Dongmyo
- Dongseongno Festival
- Donuimun
- Dosan Ahn Chang-ho Memorial Hall
- Dosan Park
- Doseonsa
- Duryu Park

== E ==
- Eight Views of Danyang
- Eight Views of Korea
- Eonyang Market
- Everland
- Expo Science Park

== F ==
- Fortress Wall of Seoul

== G ==
- Gaeunsa
- Gahoe Museum
- Gajisan (Gyeongsang-do)
- Gamnoam
- Gamsammot Park
- Gangchang Park
- Ganjeolgot
- Gansong Art Museum
- Garak Market
- Garden 5
- Geumjeongsan
- Geumjeongsanseong
- Geumseonsa
- Global Village Folk Museum
- Goseong Dinosaur Museum
- Gudeok Baseball Stadium
- Gukchae-bosang Memorial Park
- Gukje Market
- Gukjeong chumyo
- Gwaneumsa (Seoul)
- Gwangan Bridge
- Gwanghuimun
- Gwanghwamun Plaza
- Gwanghwamun
- Gwangjang Market
- Gyeongbokgung
- Gyeongdong Market
- Gyeongguksa
- Gyeonghuigung
- Gyeongju Folk Craft Village
- Gyeongju Historic Areas
- Gyeongju National Museum
- Gyeongju Seokbinggo
- Gyeongju Tower
- Gyeongsang-gamyeong Park
- Gyeongpo Lake
- Gyerim
- Gyeryongsan National Park

== H ==
- Haksan Park
- Han Sang Soo Embroidery Museum
- Hanwon Museum of Art
- Hengso Museum
- Heojun Museum
- Heosimcheong Spa
- Herbhillz
- Heunginjimun
- Hongcheonsa
- Hongneung Arboretum
- Horim Museum
- Hwajeong Museum
- Hwanghak-dong Flea Market
- Hwangnyongsa
- Hwangseong Park
- Hwanseon Cave
- Hwawon Park
- Hyehwamun
- Hyochang Park

== I ==
- Ilmin Museum of Art
- ImageRoot Museum
- Incheon Asiad Main Stadium
- Incheon Chinatown
- Incheon Football Stadium
- Incheon Munhak Stadium
- Independence Gate
- Insa-dong
- Inwangsa

== J ==
- Jangneung
- Jayu Park

== K ==
- Kim Koo Museum
- Kimchi Field Museum
- Korea Furniture Museum
- Korea Museum of Modern Costume
- Korea Racing Authority Equine Museum
- Korea University Museum
- Korean Magazine Museum
- Kumho Art Hall
- Kumho Museum of Art
- Kyujanggak
- Kyungpook National University Museum

== L ==
- Leeum, Samsung Museum of Art
- Legoland Korea Resort
- Lock Museum
- Lotte World Folk Museum
- Lotte World

== M ==
- Manworam
- Marronnier Park
- Milal Museum of Art
- Miniature Shape of the Korean Peninsula
- Mokin Museum
- Munhak Baseball Stadium
- Muryongsan (Ulsan)
- Museum for Daegu National University of Education
- Museum of Korea Straw and Plants Handicraft
- Museum of Korean Buddhist Art
- Museum of Korean Culture
- Museum of Korean Embroidery
- Museum of Korean Modern Literature
- Museum of Photography, Seoul
- Myogaksa
- Myojakdo

== N ==
- N Seoul Tower
- Naeuiwon
- Naewonsa
- Nakdong River Battle Museum
- Naksansa
- Nakseongdae
- Namdaemun Market
- Namdaemun
- Namiseom
- Namsan cable car
- National Folk Museum of Korea
- National Maritime Museum, South Korea
- National Museum of Korea
- National Palace Museum of Korea
- National Theater of Korea
- Nonghyup Agricultural Museum
- Noryangjin Fisheries Wholesale Market

== O ==
- Olympic Park, Seoul
- Olympic Stadium (Seoul)
- Olympic Velodrome (Seoul)
- Olympic Weightlifting Gymnasium
- Ojukheon
- Onggi Folk Museum

== P ==
- Paper Art Museum
- Posco Art Museum
- Presseum

== R ==
- Rodin Gallery

== S ==
- Seoul Grand Park
- Soyang River

== T ==
- Taedok Science Town Monorail
- Taehwa Comprehensive Market
- Taehwa River
- Taejongdae
- Tancheon
- Tapgol Park
- The Abraham Park Kenneth Vine Collection
- The Eight Gates of Seoul
- The Garden of Morning Calm
- The Museum of Medicine
- Tibet Museum (South Korea)
- Tongdosa
- Total Museum of Contemporary Art
- Ttangkkeut
- Tteok & Kitchen Utensil Museum

== U ==
- Udo Island
- Ulsan Central Market
- Ulsan Culture & Arts Center
- Ulsan Grand Park
- Ulsan Lightning Market
- Ulsan Museum
- Ulsan Science Museum
- Ulsan Wholesale Agricultural and Fish Market
- Ultra Architecture Museum
- Unamji Waterside Park
- Unhyeongung
- United Nations Memorial Cemetery

== W ==
- War Memorial of Korea
- West Seoul Lake Park
- Whanki Museum
- Wolbong Market
- Wolgwang Waterside Park
- Woljeongsa
- Wolmyeong Park
- Wolmyeongdong
- Wongudan
- Woori Bank Museum
- World Cup Fountain
- World Jewellery Museum

== Y ==
- Yaeum Market
- Yeongnam Alps
- Yongdusan Park
- Yongsan Electronics Market
- Yonsei University
- YoungIn Museum of Literature

== See also ==
- Korea Tourism Organization
- List of World Heritage Sites in South Korea
- List of markets in South Korea
- National Treasures of South Korea
