= List of museums in Seoul =

There are over 100 museums in Seoul.

== National museums ==
Museum	Korean name	Location	Note	Link
National Folk Museum of Korea	국립민속박물관	35 Samcheongdong-gil, Jongno District	Situated near Gyeongbokgung	
National Memorial of the Korean Provisional Government	국립대한민국임시정부기념관	79-24 Tongil-ro, Seodaemun-gu, Seoul (03732)	Exit 5 of the Dongnimmun Station, Line 3. Turn left at the Dongnipgongwon Sageori, 5 minutes’ walk (about 100 meters)	
National Museum of Korea	국립중앙박물관	Yongsan-dong, Yongsan District		
National Museum of Korean Contemporary History	대한민국역사박불관	198 Saejongdae-ro, Jongno District, Seoul	Situated near Gyeongbokgung	
National Palace Museum of Korea	국립고궁박물관	Sajikno 34 (Sejongno), Jongno District	Situated near Gyeongbokgung	
National Museum of Modern and Contemporary Art	국립현대미술관	30, Samcheong-ro, Jongno District	Situated near Gyeongbokgung	
Korean Film Museum	한국영화박물관	400, Worldcupbuk-ro, Mapo District		

== Municipal museums ==
Museum	Korean name	Location	Note	Link
Heojun Museum	허준박물관	Gayang 2-dong, Gangseo-gu		
Global Village Folk Museum	지구촌 민속교육박물관	F2 ~3 Seoul Education Research & Information Institute, 112 Sowol-ro (100-177 1ga Hoehyeon-dong), Jung District	Closed permanently as of 2016	
SeMa GyeongHuiGung	서울시립미술관 경희궁분관	2-1, Sinmunno 2-ga, Jongno District		
SeMa NamSeoul	서울시립미술관 남서울분관	1059-13 Namhyeon-dong, Gwanak-gu		
Seodaemun Museum of Natural History	서대문 자연사박물관	San 5-58 Yeonhui-3 dong, Seodaemun District		
Seoul Education Museum	서울교육사료관	19 Bukchon-gil (2 Hwa-dong), Jongno District		
Seoul Museum of Art (SeMa)	서울시립미술관	Misulgwan-gil 30 (Seosomun-dong 37), Jung District		
Seoul Museum of History	서울역사박물관	2-1 Sinmunno 1-ga, Jongno District		
Seoul Urban Life Museum	서울생활사박물관	Nowon District		
War Memorial of Korea	전쟁기념관	1ga-8 Yongsan-dong, Yongsan District		
Seoul Baekje Museum	한성백제박물관	71, Wiryeseong-daero, Songpa-gu71		

== Private museums ==
Museum	Korean name	Location	Note	Link
The Abraham Park Kenneth Vine Collection	평강성서박물관	Oryu 2-dong, Guro-gu		
Artsonje Center	아트선재센터	Sogyeok-dong, Jongno District		
Art Center Nabi	아트센터나비	Seorin-dong, Jongno District		
Bank of Korea Museum	한국은행 화페금융박물관	110 Namdaemunno 3-ga, Jung District		
Bukchon Art Museum	북촌미술관	1F, Jamiwon Building, 170-12 Gahoe-dong, Jongno District		
Chiwoo Craft Museum	치우금속공예관	610-11 Umyeon-dong, Seocho District		
Chohong Museum of Finance				
Chojun Textile & Quilt Art Museum	초전섬유퀼트박물관	F1. Jeil Cultural Center, 1-20 Namsan-dong, Jung District		
Coreana Cosmetic Museum				
Dosan Ahn Chang-ho Memorial Hall				
Gahoe Museum	가회박물관	Gahoe-dong, Jongno District		
Global Village Folk Museum	지구촌민속박물관			
The Han Sang Soo Embroidery Museum	한상수 자수박물관	Seongbuk-dong 58-13, Seongbuk-gu		
Hanul Science Museum	한얼박물관			
Hanwon Museum of Art				
Horim Museum	호림박물관	Sillim-dong, Gwanak-gu		
Hwajeong Museum	화정박물관	Pyeongchang-dong, Jongno District		
Ilmin Museum of Art	일민미술관	Jongno District		
ImageRoot Museum				
Jeoldu-san Memorial Shrine	절두산	Hapjeong-dong, Mapo-gu		
Museum Kimchikan	뮤지엄 김치간	Insa-dong, Jongno District		
Kim Koo Museum	백범기념관	Hyochang-dong, Yongsan District		
Korea Racing Association Equine Museum				http://www.kra.co.kr
Kobaco - Korean Broadcasting and Advertisement Museum	한국광고박물관	Sinchon-dong, Songpa-gu		
Korea Furniture Museum				
Korean Magazine Museum				
Korea Museum of Modern Costume				
Kumho Museum of Art				
Leeum, Samsung Museum of Art		Itaewon, Yongsan District		
Lotte World Folk Museum				
Milal Museum of Art				
Mokin Museum				
Museum of Art, Seoul National University				
Museum of Japanese Colonial History in Korea		Cheongpa-dong		
Museum of Korean Buddhist Art		Wonseo-dong, Jongno District		
Museum of Korean Embroidery				
Museum of Korean Modern Literature		Jangchung-dong, Jung District		
Museum of Korea Straw and Plants Handicraft		Myeongnyun-dong, Jongno District		
The Museum of Medicine				
The Museum of Photography, Seoul		Bangi-dong, Songpa-gu		
Nonghyup Agricultural Museum				
Lock Museum	쇳대박물관	187-8, Dongsung-dong, [Jongno District]		
Onggi Folk Museum	옹기민속박물관	Ssangmun 1-dong, Dobong District		
Paper Art Museum				
Posco Art Museum				
Presseum		Sejongno, Jongno District		
Plateau (formerly called 'Rodin Gallery')		Taepyeongno 2-ga, Jung District		
Samseong Museum of Publishing				
Savina Museum		Anguk-dong, Jongno District		
Seokbong Ceramic Museum				
Seonbawi Museum of Art				
Seoul Olympic Museum				
Seoul Olympic Art Museum				
Seoul Art Center	예술의 전당	Seocho-dong, Seocho District		http://www.sac.or.kr
Seoul Arts Center Hangaram Design Museum		Seocho District		
Simone Handbag Museum		Gangnam District		
Sungkok Art Museum	성곡미술관	Jongno District		
Sung Am Archives of Classical Literature				
Tibet Museum	티벳박물관	Sogyeok-dong, Jongno District		
Total Museum of Contemporary Art		Pyeongchang-dong, Jongno District		
Tteok & Kitchen Utensil Museum	떡•부엌살림 박물관	Waryong-dong, Jongno District		
Ultra Architecture Museum				
Whanki Museum	환기미술관	Buam-dong, Jongno District		
Woori Bank Museum				
World Jewellery Museum				
YoungIn Museum of Literature		Pyeongchang-dong, Jongno District		
Trickeye Museum	트릭아이 미술관	Seogyo-dong, Mapo-gu		

== See also ==
- List of museums in South Korea
- List of tallest buildings in Seoul
- Architecture of South Korea

== General references ==
- Korean museum association
- (in Korean) List of museums in South Korea
- (in Korean) Museums in Jongno District, Seoul
- (in Korean) List of museums in South Korea
