= Hwajeong =

Hwajeong may refer to:

- Hwajeong-myeon (disambiguation)
- Hwajeong, the 2015 South Korean TV series Splendid Politics
- Hwajeong Museum, Seoul
- Hwajeong station (Goyang)
- Hwajeong station (Gwangju)
