= Seoul Education Museum =

Museum in Seoul, South Korea

Coordinates: 37°34′47.16″N 126°59′0″E

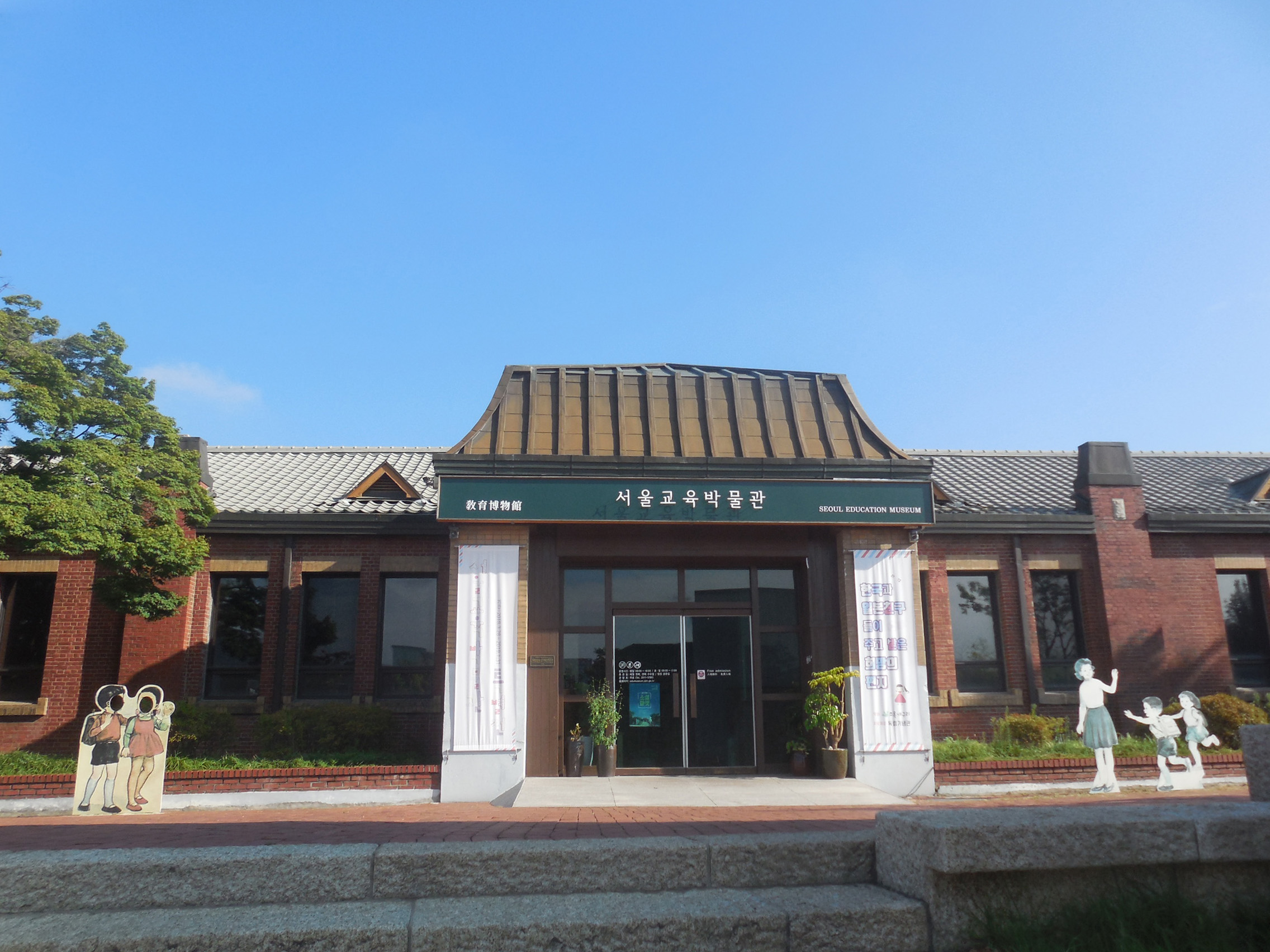
- Established: 15 June 1995
- Location: 19 Bukchon-gil (2 Hwa-dong), Jongno-gu, Seoul, South Korea
- Director: Yu Wang-jun
- Website: edumuseum.sen.go.kr

Korean name
- Hangul: 서울교육박물관
- Hanja: 서울敎育博物館
- RR: Seoul gyoyuk bangmulgwan
- MR: Sŏul kyoyuk pangmulgwan

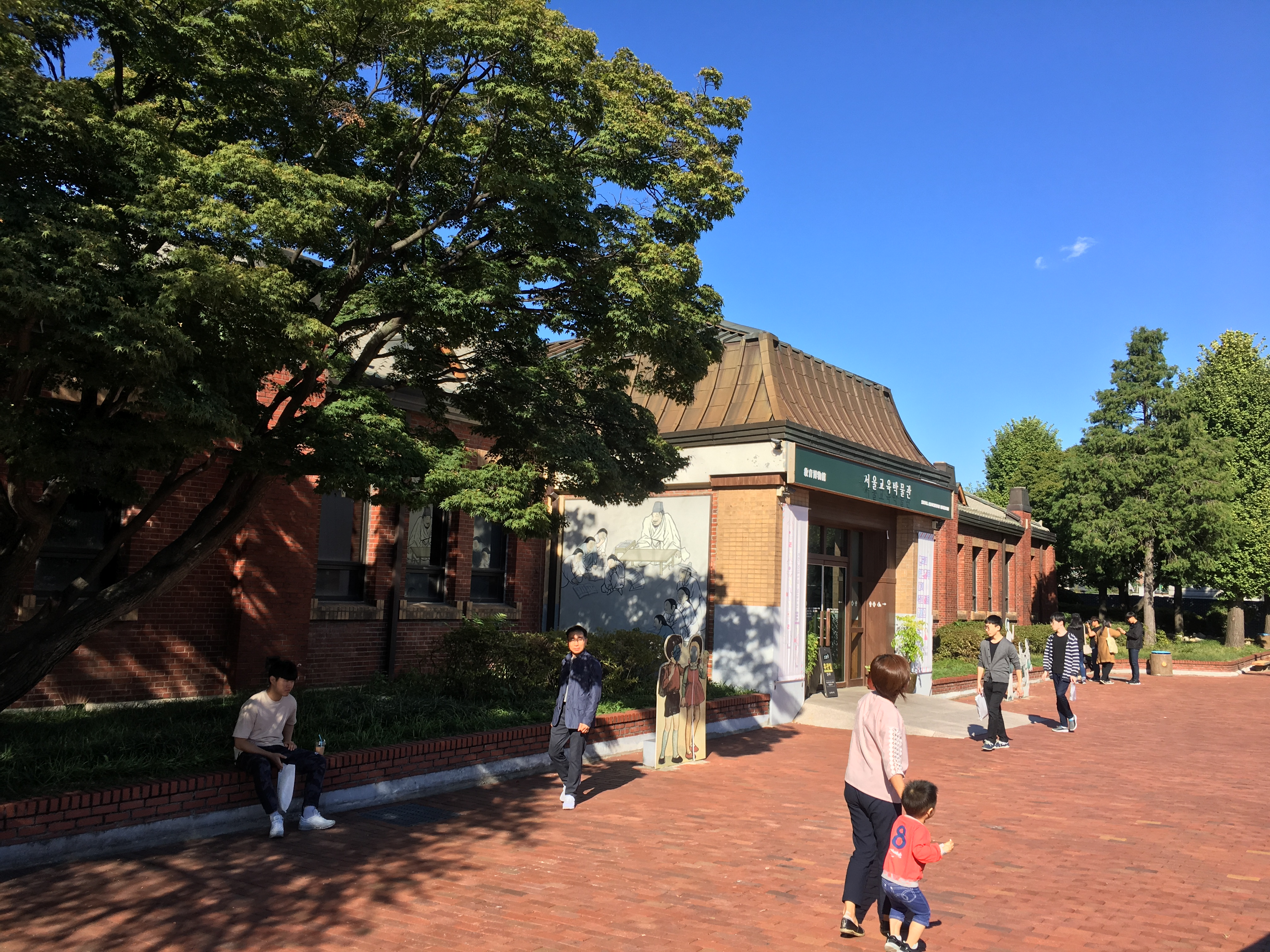
Seoul Education Museum in September 2018

Textbooks published during the 1960s.

The Seoul Education Museum is an education museum in Seoul, South Korea. The museum focuses on the history of education in Korea, beginning in the Three Kingdoms period through the modern day.

In 2025, the museum honored 80 years of liberation, through a special graffiti exhibition and informative displays.

== See also ==
- History of Korea
- List of museums in Seoul
- List of museums in South Korea
