= Sinmunno =

Sinmunno (신문로 新門路), a new gate on a road, may refer to:

- Sinmunno 1-ga, a dong (neighborhood) in Jongno-gu, Seoul, South Korea
- Sinmunno 2-ga, a dong (neighborhood) in Jongno-gu, Seoul, South Korea
