= Gangchang =

Gangchang may refer to:

- Gangchang Park in Dalseo District, Daegu, South Korea
- Gangchang station of Daegu Metro Line 2 also in Dalseo District
- Three Fundamental Bonds and Five Constant Virtues of Confucianism, or gangchang (綱常) in Chinese
