= Chohong Museum of Finance =

Numismatics museum in Seoul, South Korea

- Established: 1997
- Location: 14, 1-ga Namdaemun-ro, Jung-gu, Seoul, South Korea; 62-12 Taepyeongno 1-ga, Seoul, South Korea, 04519
- Coordinates: 37.5686°N 126.9764°E
- Website: shinhanmuseum.co.kr

The Chohong Museum of Finance is a numismatics museum in Seoul, South Korea. It was created in 1997 by the Chohung Bank, which called itself the oldest bank in Korea. The museum's collections were acquired by Shinhan Bank, which renamed the museum the Korea Financial History Museum. "The Museum of Korean Financial History collects, preserves and exhibits historic materials of Shinhan. Bank and, on a broader level, Korean financial ..."

== See also ==
- Woori Bank Museum
- Bank of Korea Money Museum
- List of museums in South Korea
