= Yongsan Electronics Market =

Retail area in Seoul, South Korea

Coordinates: 37.533°N 126.963°E

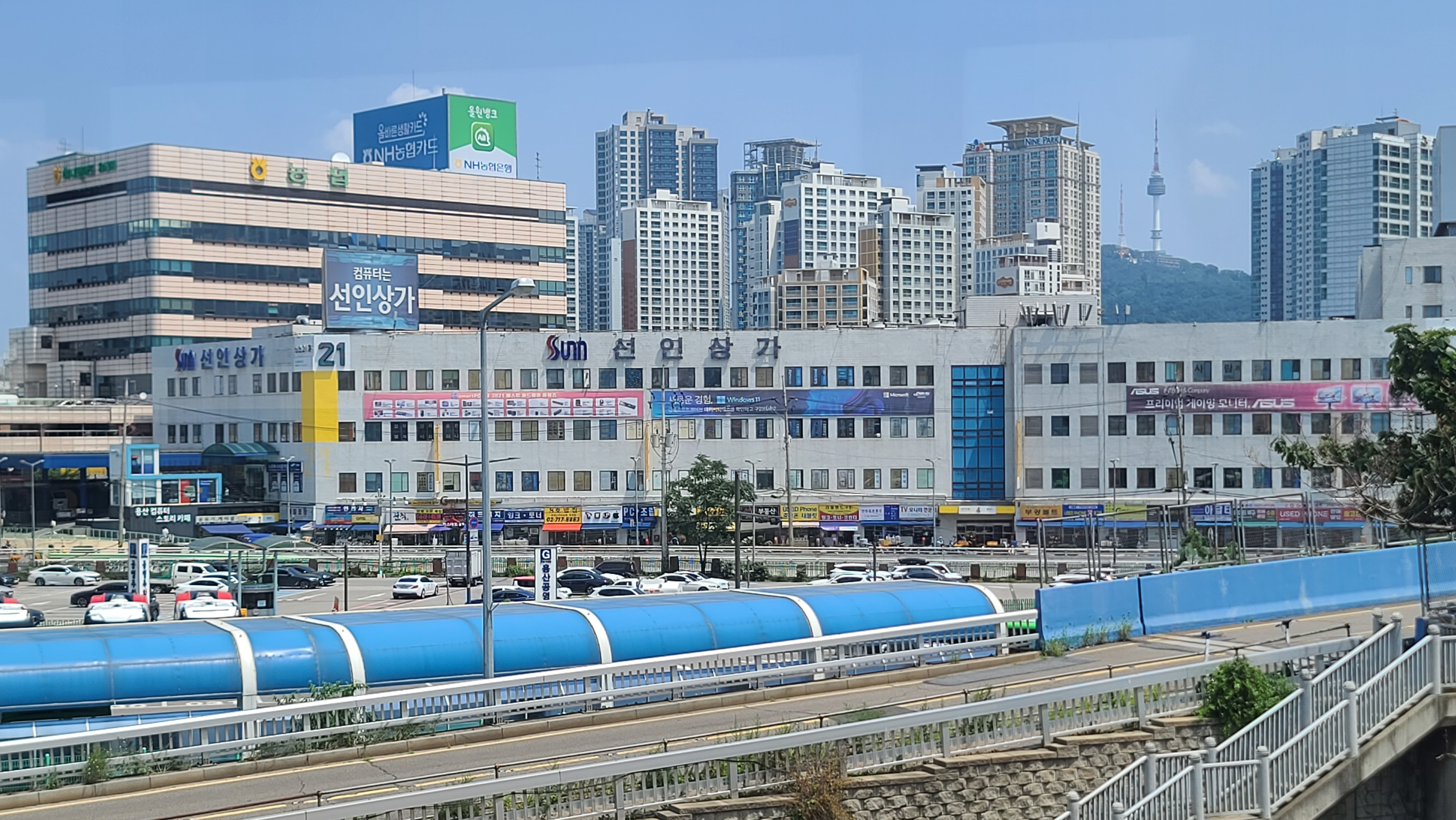

Korean name
- Hangul: 용산전자상가
- Hanja: 龍山電子商街
- RR: Yongsan jeonja sangga
- MR: Yongsan chŏnja sangga

Yongsan Electronics Market (Korean: 용산전자상가) is a retail area in Seoul, South Korea. Comprising over 20 buildings, it houses 5,000 stores that sell appliances, stereos, computers and peripherals, office equipment, telephones, lighting equipment, electronic games and software, videos, and CDs.

The market has a variety of stores, each with different operating procedures. Some stores operate like traditional retail shops, with set prices, name brands, and warranties. Other shops accept, or even expect, customers to bargain and may not have any posted prices for items.

The Electronics Market is located on Subway line 1, at Yongsan Station, at Exit 2. Entrance is from the train station through the Terminal Shopping Center or by walking around the station at ground level to enter the market. It may also be reached by the subway line to Sinyongsan station.

Merchants at Yongsan Electronics Market compete for customer attention, leading shopgoers to coin the term yongpari (용팔이), with pari (팔이) meaning "fly", to criticize their behavior. Due to this publicity, the President of the Hyundai I shopping mall announced in 2008 that it seeks to improve misconduct and offer improved customer service.

== See also ==
- List of markets in South Korea
- List of South Korean tourist attractions
