= Total Museum of Contemporary Art =

- Established: 1976
- Location: 465-16 Pyeongchang-dong, Jongno-gu, 110-848 Seoul, South Korea
- Coordinates: 37.6120°N 126.9757°E
- Type: Art museum
- Public transit access: Seoul Metropolitan Subway; Gyeongbokgung Station, exit 3 or Gireum Station, exit 3
- Website: www.totalmuseum.org

Korean name
- Hangul: 토탈 미술관
- Hanja: 토탈 美術館
- RR: Total misulgwan
- MR: T'ot'al misulgwan

The Total Museum of Contemporary Art (TMCA; Korean: 토탈 미술관) is a non-profit museum in the Pyeongchang-dong district of Seoul, South Korea. The museum, previously named the Total Outdoor Museum, was the first private art institute in South Korea.

== History ==
The museum began in 1976 as an open-air gallery named the Total Outdoor Museum. A year before the 1988 Summer Olympics in Seoul, the TCMA was approved as the first private museum in South Korea. Architect Shin Gyu Moon designed the main exhibition hall. In 1993 the museum was awarded the Architecture of the Year Award by the Korean Institute of Architects.

== Exhibition hall ==
The main building has 3 floors including space for several exhibitions, a curator lab, conference rooms, a vault, a library, a cafe, and an outdoor space for performances. The museum's focus is on regional contemporary art but also allows for cultural events including concerts, lectures, and seminars.

== Education ==
An education program was created in 1993 for teaching the public about art. One-year programs in art, music, architecture, film, and literature are offered at the museum.

The "Dream Up Children!" program was created to teach children to communicate creatively through art.

"The Room" is a program that was designed as a learning tool for beginner curators. The curators are given the freedom to create their own exhibition within the museum's space.

== See also ==
- List of museums in Seoul
- List of museums in South Korea
