= Plateau (museum) =

General information
- Type: Art gallery
- Location: 1st Floor, Samsung Life Insurance Building, Taepyeongno 2-ga, Joong-gu, 100-716 Seoul, Korea, South Korea
- Opened: May 14, 1999
- Demolished: August 31, 2016

Design and construction
- Architecture firm: Samoo Architects & Engineers

Website
- www.plateau.or.kr

Plateau (formerly called Rodin Gallery) was an art gallery on Taepyeongno street in Jongno District, a central district of Seoul, South Korea. The gallery contained sculptures by Auguste Rodin (1840–1917). It opened on the first floor of the Samsung Life Insurance building on May 14, 1999, as 'Rodin Gallery'. In May 2011 the gallery was renamed 'Plateau' in order to better express its 'commitment to embracing the Korean and international contemporary Art Scene'. It closed in August 2016.

== See also ==
- Bukchon Art Museum
- List of museums in South Korea
- Seoul Museum of Art
