= Gayang-dong =

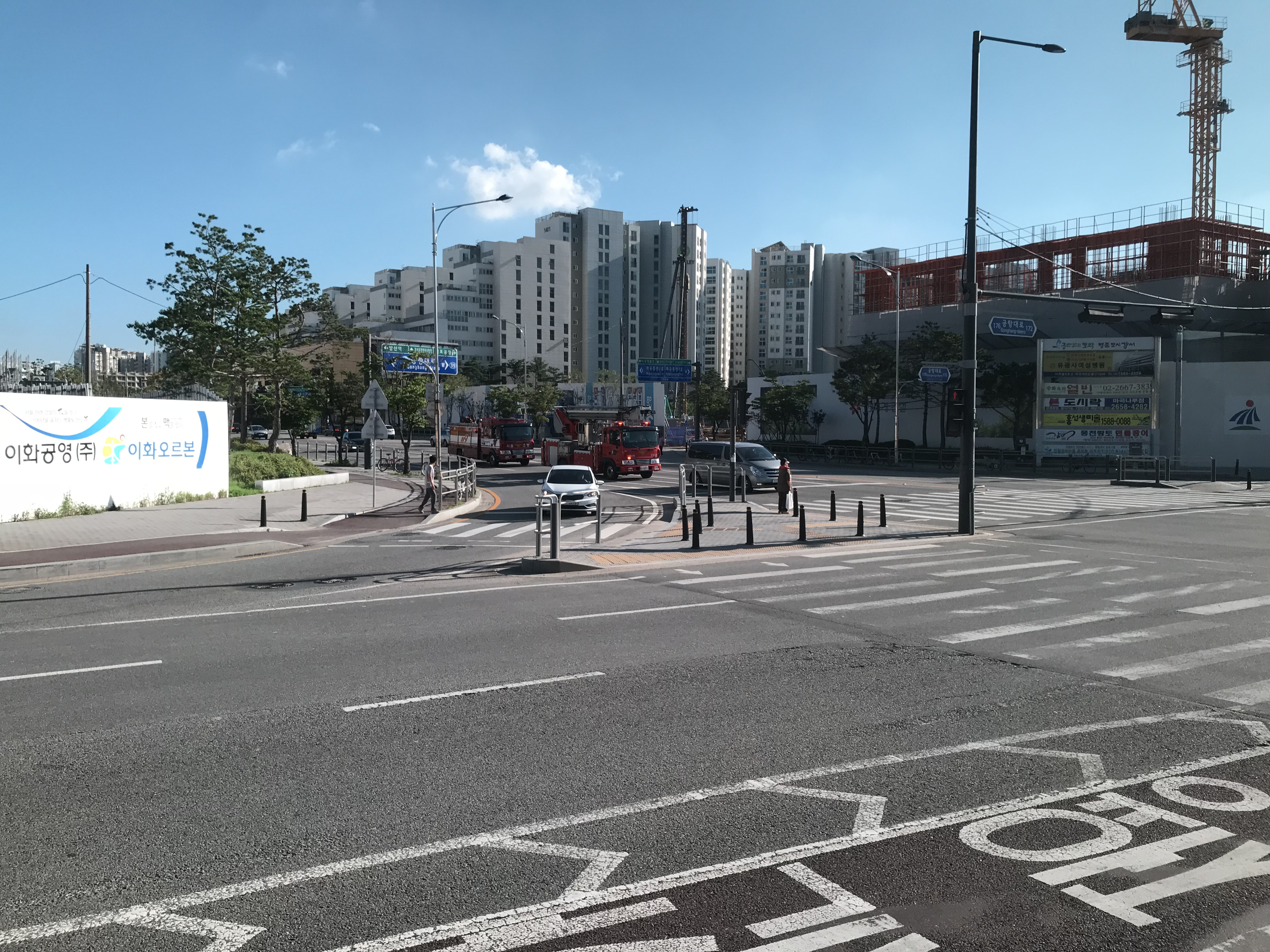
- Country: South Korea

Area
  - Total: 6.69 km^{2} (2.58 sq mi)

Population (2001)
  - Total: 65,809
  - Density: 9,837/km^{2} (25,480/sq mi)

Korean name
- Hangul: 가양동
- Hanja: 加陽洞
- RR: Gayang-dong
- MR: Kayang-dong

Gayang-dong (Korean: 가양동) is a dong (neighborhood) of Gangseo District, Seoul, South Korea.

== Overview ==
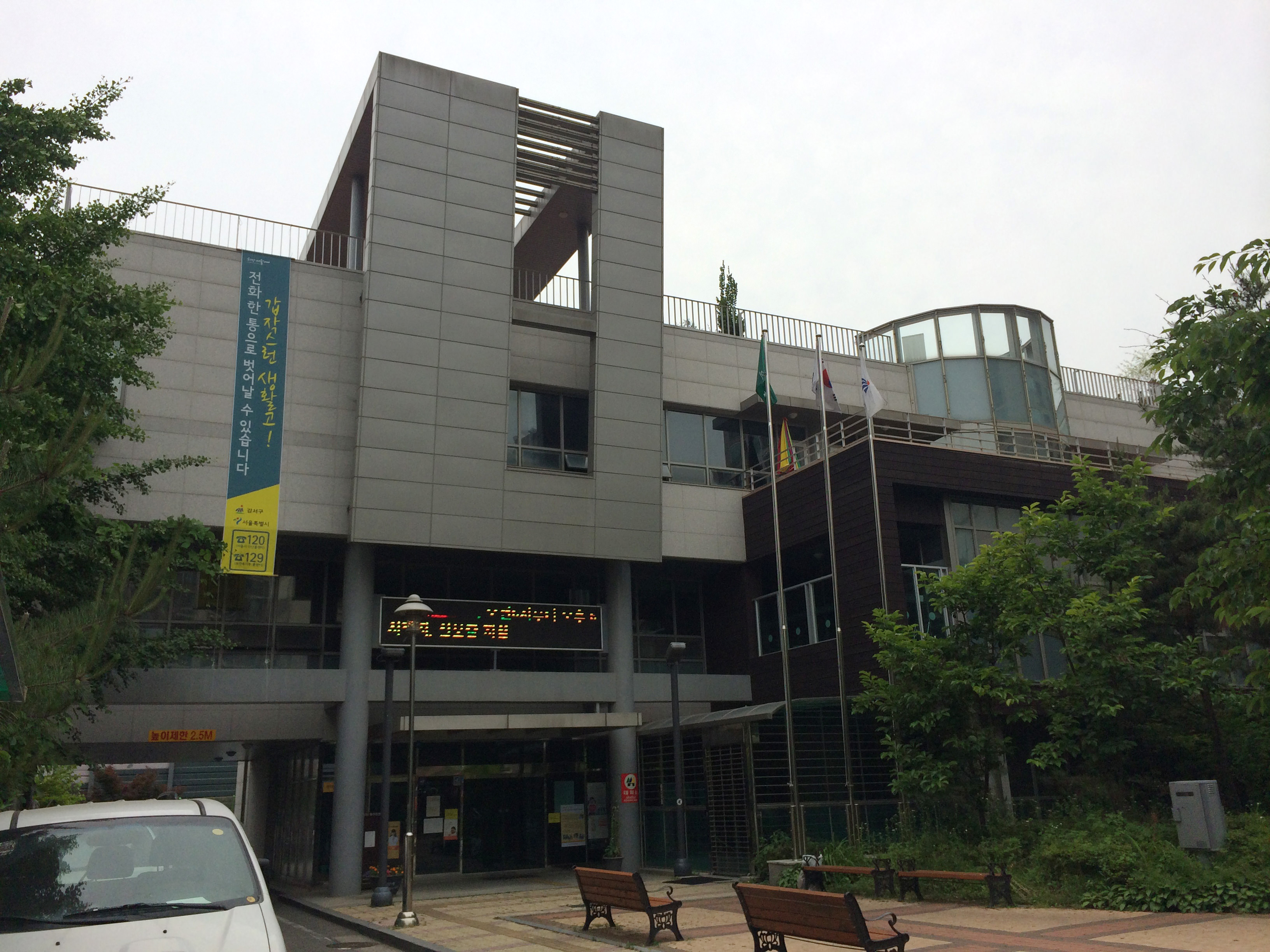
Gayang 1-dong Community Service Center (Gangseo-gu)

The name Gayang-dong originated from the combination of two former localities: Gamadong (加麻洞) and Goyang-ri (古陽里). The name was formed by taking the character "Ga" (加) from Gamadong and "Yang" (陽) from Goyang-ri.

The western region of the Han River, where Gayang-dong is located, corresponds to the historical area known as Michuhol. According to the Samguk Sagi, locations such as Inbeollo-hyeon (present-day Siheung), Jechapaeui-hyeon (present-day Gangseo District), and Maesohol-hyeon (present-day Incheon) were part of Michuhol. These references indicate that the area now known as Gangseo-gu has historical ties to the early Baekje kingdom.

On March 1, 1914, during a nationwide administrative reorganization under Japanese rule, several villages from Gunnae-myeon in Yangcheon-gun, Gyeonggi Province—including Hyanggyo-dong, Goyang-ri, Gamadong, Seongjaejeong-ri, and Gongam-ri—were merged to form Gayang-ri in Yangdong-myeon, Gimpo-gun.

On January 1, 1963, Gayang-ri was incorporated into Seoul and became part of Yeongdeungpo District. It was transferred to the newly established Gangseo District on September 1, 1977, following the division of Yeongdeungpo District. On April 1, 1993, Gayang-dong was subdivided into Gayang 1-dong, 2-dong, and 3-dong.

== Attractions ==
- Heojun Museum

== See also ==
- Administrative divisions of South Korea
