= Umyeon-dong =

Neighborhood in Seoul, South Korea

- Country: South Korea

Korean name
- Hangul: 우면동
- Hanja: 牛眠洞
- RR: Umyeon-dong
- MR: Umyŏn-dong

Umyeon-dong (Korean: 우면동) is a dong (neighbourhood) of Seocho District, Seoul, South Korea is part of Gangnam District and a well-known, private neighborhood for the wealthy in southern Seoul. It is a legal dong (법정동) administered under its administrative dong (행정동), Yangjae 1-dong. The first syllable of the name is derived from Umyeonsan, or Mt. Umyeon due to the geographical feature of the area has the mountain.

== Mount Umyeon-san ==
The mountain peak of Umyeon-San is located approximately 10 km (6.2 mi) south of Seoul, and about 5 km (3.1 mi) northeast of Gwanaksan. Satelliteviews.net lists the peak elevation as "313", while Google Earth shows the maximum elevation at 280 m (920 ft), within a populated area.

== Floods and landmines ==
During the 2011 Seoul floods, a landslide on an unstable slope of Mount Umyeon destroyed an apartment row, killing 17 people and may have buried about ten landmines dropped on the mountainsides during the Korean War.

== Attraction ==
- Chiwoo Craft Museum

== See also ==
- Yangjaecheon
- Administrative divisions of South Korea
