= Tteok Museum =

Museum in Seoul, South Korea

Coordinates: 37.5749°N 126.9906°E

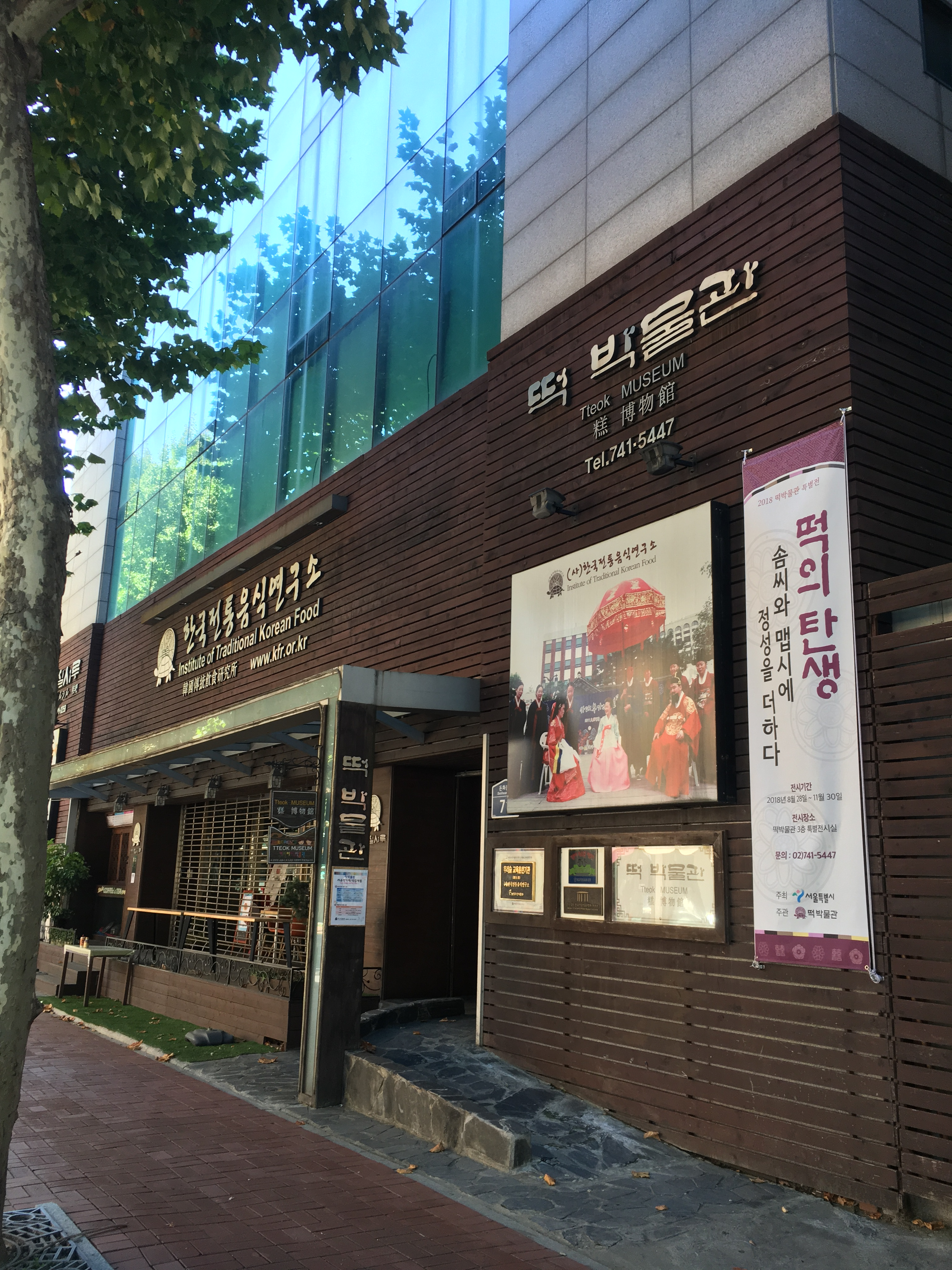
- Established: December 2002
- Location: 164-2 Waryong-dong, Jongno-gu, Seoul, South Korea
- Director: Yoon Sookja
- Website: tkmuseum.or.kr

Korean name
- Hangul: 떡박물관
- Hanja: 떡博物館
- RR: Tteok bangmulgwan
- MR: Ttŏk pangmulgwan

Tteok Museum is a museum located in Waryong-dong, Jongno District, Seoul, South Korea. Founded by Yoon Sookja, the chief director of the Institute of Traditional Korean Food (한국전통음식연구소), it opened in December, 2002. The museum specializes in Korean cutlery with approximately 2,000 old Korean kitchen utensils from ancient maetdol (맷돌, grinding stones) to early 20th century kitchenwares on display and exhibits 50 of Korea's nearly 200 types of tteok (Korean rice cake).

== See also ==
- Tteok
- Korean cuisine
- Kimchi Field Museum
- Korean Folk Village
- List of museums in Seoul
- List of food and beverage museums
