= Art Sonje Center =

Coordinates: 37.5794°N 126.9818°E

Artsonje Center 아트선재센터
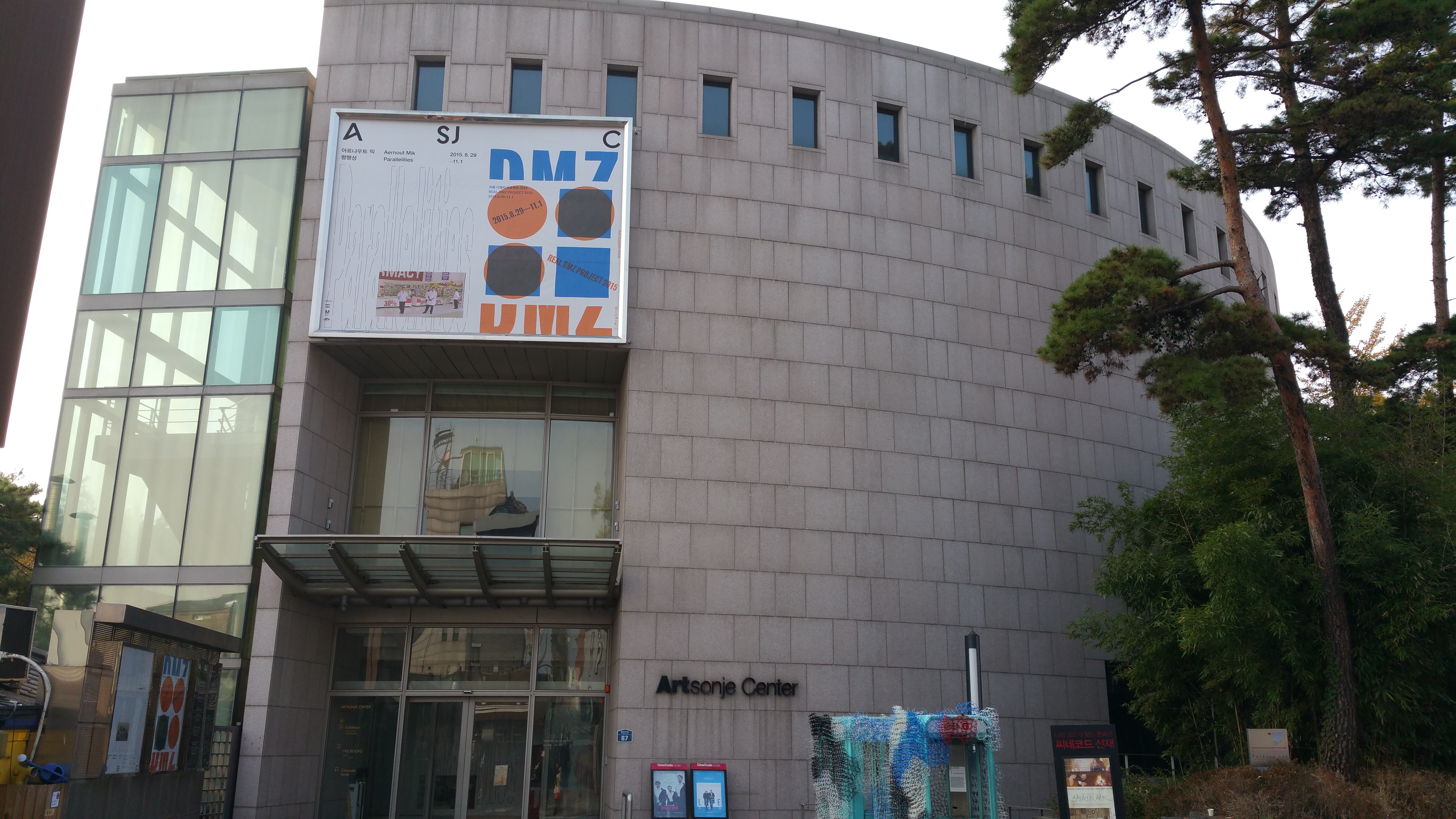
- Established: 1998
- Location: Sokeuk-dong, 43 Gamgodang-gil, Jongno-gu, Seoul, South Korea
- Type: Art museum
- Website: http://www.artsonje.org

Artsonje Center is a private art museum in Seoul, Korea, located in Samcheong-dong, a neighborhood adjacent to known for its numerous art galleries, cafes, restaurants and boutiques. Founded in 1998, the museum introduces current and experimental contemporary art to the art world and public with its international exhibitions and educational programs.

The marble multiplex was designed by Jong-Sung Kim and consists of 4 annexes that include exhibition halls, lecture halls, a restaurant, café and artshop. The CineCode Sonje movie theater is a good place to catch offbeat independent films.

== See also ==
- List of museums in Seoul
- List of museums in South Korea
- Korean art
- Culture of South Korea
