= Heojun Museum =

Biographical museum in Seoul, South Korea

Coordinates: 37.5680°N 126.8510°E

Heojun Museum 허준박물관
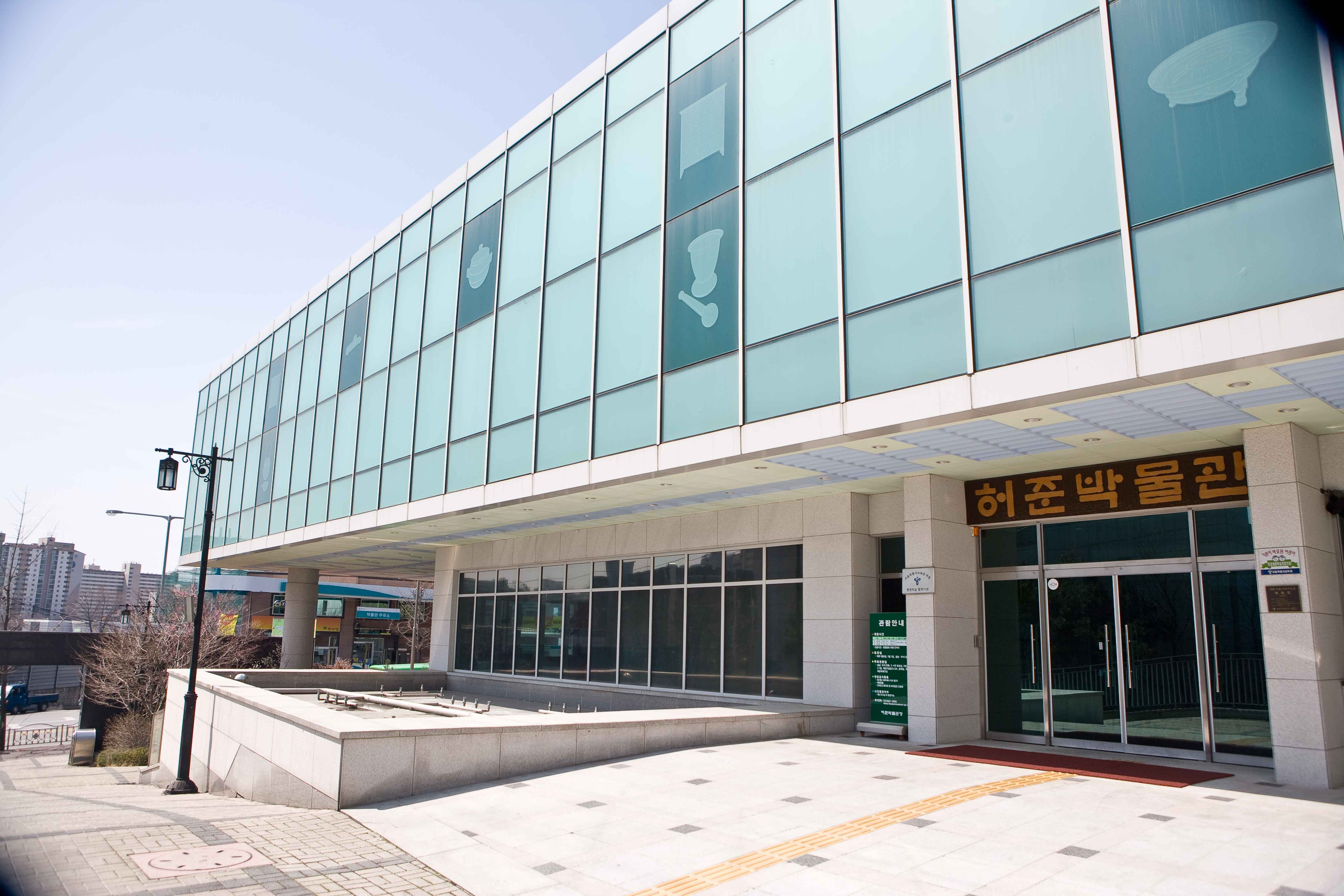
- Established: March 23, 2005
- Location: Gayang 2-dong, Gangseo-gu, Seoul, South Korea
- Director: Kim Kwae-jeong
- Website: http://www.heojun.seoul.kr/

Heojun Museum (Korean: 허준박물관) is a municipal museum in Gayang 2-dong, Gangseo District, Seoul, South Korea to commemorate the legacy of Heo Jun (1546–1615), a court physician during the reign of King Seonjo (r. 1567–1608) of the mid Joseon Dynasty of Korea.

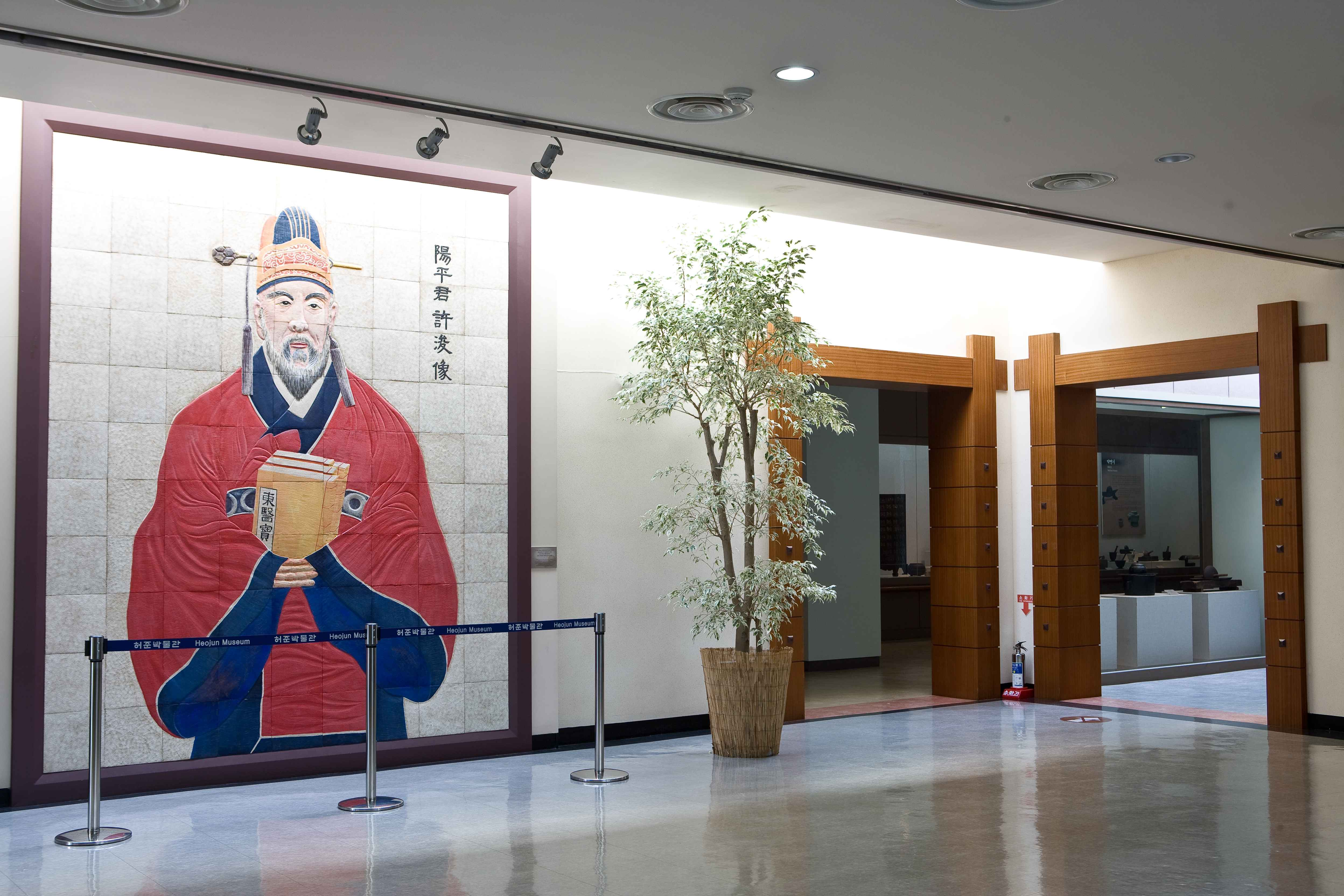

== See also ==
- List of museums in Seoul
- List of museums in South Korea
- Dongui Bogam, ancient Korean medical book compiled by Heo Jun
