= Museum Kimchikan =

Food museum in Seoul, South Korea

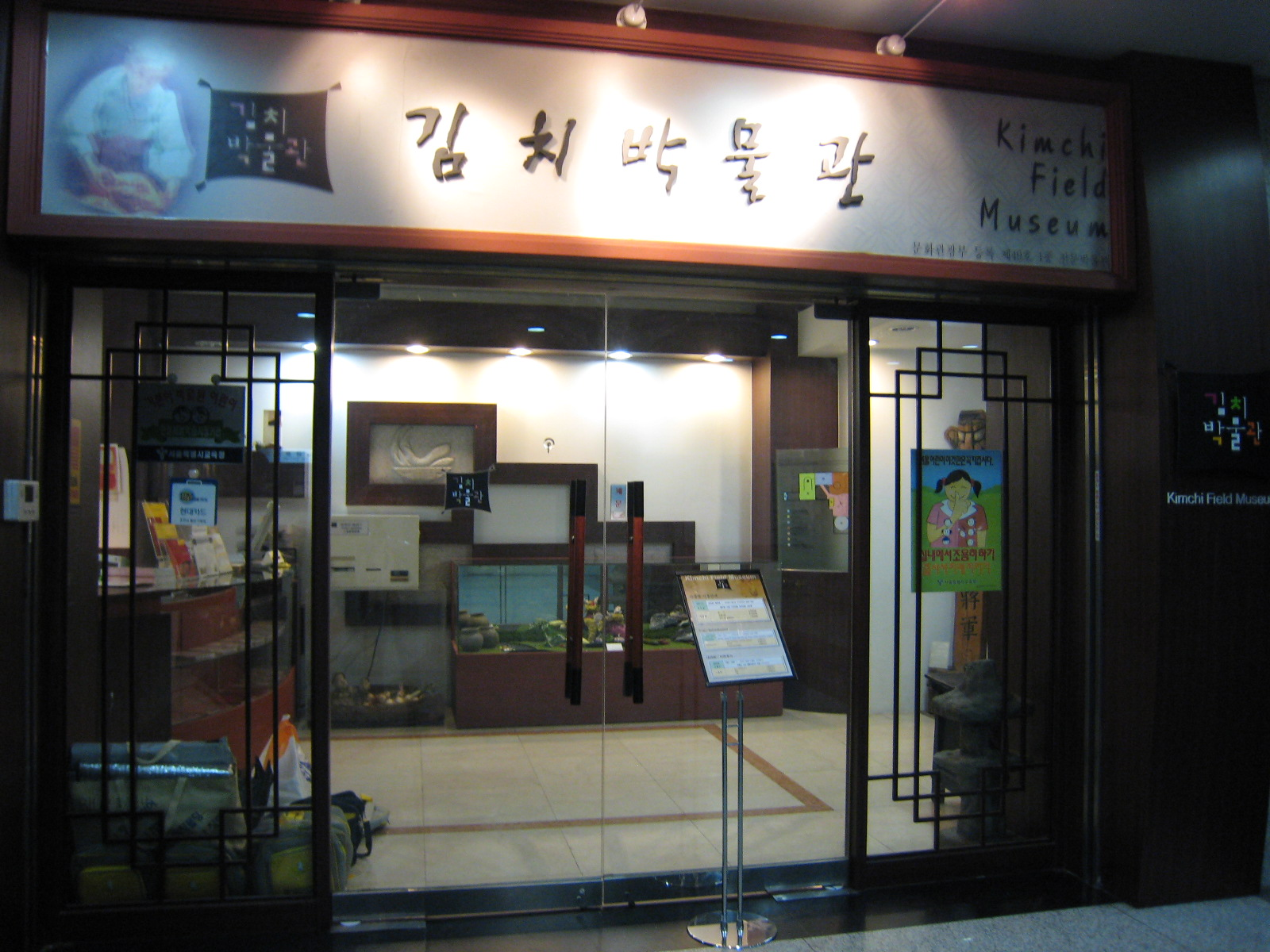
- Museum's old location in COEX (2007)
- Established: 1986
- Location: 35-4, Insa-dong, Jongno District, Seoul, South Korea
- Coordinates: 37.57352°N 126.98484°E
- Type: Food museum
- Owner: Pulmuone Inc
- Website: www.kimchikan.com/en/ (in English)

Korean name
- Hangul: 뮤지엄 김치간
- RR: Myujieom gimchigan
- MR: Myujiŏm kimch'igan

Museum Kimchikan (Korean: 뮤지엄 김치간), formerly Kimchi Field Museum, is a food museum in Insa-dong, Jongno District, Seoul, South Korea. It originally opened in 1986 as the first such museum in Korea, and has since moved locations twice. It focuses on kimchi: one of the staples of Korean cuisine.

== Description ==
Exhibits focus on the food's history, its historical and regional varieties, and its importance to Korean culture and cuisine. The museum collects data and statistics on kimchi and regularly offers activities for visitors, such as demonstrations of the kimchi-making process, kimchi tastings, and cooking classes.

It is closed on Mondays, as well as during Lunar New Year, Chuseok, and Christmas.

The admission fees are KRW 5,000 for adults (19 & up), KRW 3,000 for adolescents and teens (8-18), and KRW 2,000 for children (3-7), with the Cabbage Kimchi Workshop priced at KRW 25,000.

== History ==
The Kimchi Field Museum was originally established in 1986 in Pil-dong, Jung District. It was the first museum to kimchi in the country. From 1987, the museum was managed by Pulmuone Inc. In 1988, the museum was moved to the COEX (Convention and Exhibition Center), in connection with the 1988 Summer Olympics that were hosted in Seoul that year.

In 2015, the museum was selected as one of the world's top 11 food museums by CNN.

The museum moved from its COEX location, and was reopened in its current Insa-dong location on April 21, 2015.

== See also ==
- Kimchi
- Tteok & Kitchen Utensil Museum
- List of museums in Seoul
