= Museum for Daegu National University of Education =

- Established: 1975
- Location: 219 Jungang-daero; Nam-gu, Daegu, South Korea
- Coordinates: 35.85258821440352°N 128.5885862138284°E
- Type: University museum
- Website: nam.daegu.kr/eng/index.do?menu_id=60001548

- Museum for Daegu National University of Education
- Hangul: 대구교육대학교 교육박물관
- Hanja: 大邱敎育大學校 敎育博物館
- RR: Daegu gyoyuk daehakgyo gyoyuk bangmulgwan
- MR: Taegu kyoyuk taehakkyo kyoyuk pangmulgwan

Museum for Daegu National University of Education is a museum in Nam-gu, Daegu, South Korea.

The museum opened 29 October 1975; it has 6,247 common relics, and 169 national relics.
