= YoungIn Museum of Literature =

Literary museum in Seoul, South Korea

The YoungIn Museum of Literature is a literature museum in Pyeongchang-dong, Jongno-gu, Seoul in South Korea.

== See also ==
- List of museums in South Korea
