= Taedok Science Town Monorail =

Overview
- Locale: Daejeon
- Transit type: straddle-beam monorail
- Number of lines: 1
- Number of stations: 3

Operation
- Began operation: August 7, 1993
- Number of vehicles: 3

Technical
- System length: 2.4 km (1.49 mi)

The Taedok Science Town Monorail is a monorail in Daejeon, built for the Taejŏn Expo '93. It still operates today as a tourist attraction. It has eight-car trains running around a loop.
