= Horim Museum =

- Established: 1982
- Location: Sillim-dong, Gwanak District, Seoul, South Korea
- Coordinates: 37°28′51″N 126°55′07″E
- Type: Art museum
- Director: Yun Jang-seob
- Website: horimmuseum.org

Korean name
- Hangul: 호림박물관
- Hanja: 湖林博物館
- Revised Romanization: Horim bangmulgwan
- McCune–Reischauer: Horim pangmulgwan

Horim Museum is a museum in Seoul, South Korea.

The museum was founded by Yun Jang-seob (윤장섭 尹章燮) who after setting up the Sungbo Cultural Foundation (성보문화재단 成保文化財團) in July 1981 to purchase antiquities, established the Horim Museum in October 1982 at Daechi-dong, Gangnam District by leasing one floor of a building. In May 1999 it relocated to Sillim-dong, Gwanak District with four main exhibition galleries — the Archaeology Gallery, the Ceramics Gallery, the Metal Art Gallery and the Painting and Book Gallery — and a special gallery and souvenir shop and rooms in total covering about 4,600 square metres.

The museum owns more than 10,000 pieces of Korean art including more than 3,000 earthenwares, 2,100 porcelains, 1,100 celadons, 500 buncheongs, 2,000 paintings, 400 pieces of metal art amongst many other items.

== See also ==
- List of museums in Seoul
- List of museums in South Korea
