= Oryu-dong =

- Country: South Korea

Area
  - Total: 5.15 km^{2} (1.99 sq mi)

Population (2001)
  - Total: 46,358
  - Density: 9,000/km^{2} (23,300/sq mi)

Korean name
- Hangul: 오류동
- Hanja: 梧柳洞
- RR: Oryu-dong
- MR: Oryu-dong

Oryu-dong (Korean: 오류동) is a dong (neighbourhood) of Guro District, Seoul, South Korea.

== Attractions ==
- The Abraham Park Kenneth Vine Collection

== See also ==
- Administrative divisions of South Korea
