= The Abraham Park Kenneth Vine Collection =

Biblical history museum in Seoul, South Korea

- Established: November, 1998
- Location: 150-15 Oryu 2-dong, Guro-gu, Seoul, South Korea
- Coordinates: 37°29′31.05″N 126°50′38.67″E
- Type: Biblical History Museum
- Collection size: 2,000 artefacts
- Director: Young-rok Kim
- Website: apm.or.kr

Korean name
- Hangul: 평강성서유물박물관
- Revised Romanization: Pyeonggang Seongseo Bakmulgwan
- McCune–Reischauer: Pyongkang Songso Pakmulkwan

The Abraham Park Kenneth Vine Collection, also known as the Pyung Kang Biblical Archaeology Museum, is a privately owned museum established by Rev. Abraham Yoon-sik Park, the senior pastor of Pyungkang Cheil Presbyterian Church and the author of the History of Redemption Series and Dr Kenneth Vine, an American biblical archaeologist and former president of Loma Linda University, California, United States. It is currently situated in Oryu-dong, Guro-gu, Seoul, South Korea, adjacent to Pyungkang Cheil Presbyterian Church.

== History ==
The museum first opened to the public in November 1998. Kenneth Vine initially planned on giving his collection to his only son, but his son died in a car accident. Vine then donated his collection of artefacts to the founder of Pyungkang Cheil Presbyterian Church, Abraham Yoon-sik Park. Together, they established The Abraham Park Kenneth Vine Collection, next to Pyungkang Cheil Presbyterian Church.

The Abraham Park Kenneth Vine Collection has exhibits themed around religion and archaeology. It has a collection of Egyptian and Middle Eastern artifacts.

== See also ==
- List of museums in Seoul
- List of museums in South Korea
