= Hwajeong-myeon =

Hwajeong-myeon may refer to:

- Hwajeong-myeon, Yeosu(화정면): myeon in Yeosu, South Jeolla Province, South Korea
- Hwajeong-myeon, Uiryeong(화정면): myeon in Uiryeong County, North Gyeongsang Province, South Korea
