= Chiwoo Craft Museum =

Crafts museum in Seoul, South Korea

Yoolizzy Craft Museum
- Established: 20 May 2004
- Location: 610-11 Umyeon-dong, Seocho-gu, Seoul, South Korea
- Coordinates: 37°27′28″N 127°00′44″E
- Director: Yoo lizzy

Korean name
- Hangul: 유리지공예관
- Hanja: 劉里知工藝館
- Revised Romanization: Yoolizzy Craft Museum
- McCune–Reischauer: Yoolizzy Craft Museum

The Yoolizzy Craft Museum is a museum located in Umyeon-dong, Seocho-gu, Seoul, South Korea.

The museum was established on October 8, 2004, as a private non-profit art museum dedicated to researching, collecting, exhibiting, and providing educational and hands-on experiences that connect the aesthetic qualities inherent in the traditions of Korean craft with the currents of contemporary art. It was officially registered as an art museum in 2005.

Founded by the craft artist Yoo lizzy, the museum specializes in exhibitions of contemporary metal crafts, the discovery and support of emerging artists, and research on Korean metalwork.

== See also ==
- Korean art
- List of museums in Seoul
- List of museums in South Korea
