= Sung Am Archives of Classical Literature =

Literature museum in Seoul, South Korea

The Sung Am Archives of Classical Literature is a literature museum in Seoul, South Korea. It was created in 1974 using a donation from architect Cho Byung-soo.

== See also ==
- List of museums in South Korea
