= Global Village Folk Museum =

2004–2016 museum in Seoul, South Korea

Coordinates: 37.5546°N 126.9813°E

- Established: 21 May 2002
- Location: F2 ~3 Seoul Education Research & Information Institute, 112 Sowolgil (100-177 1ga Hoehyeon-dong), Jung-gu, Seoul, South Korea
- Website: http://www.serii.re.kr/cms.do?method=getCms&mcode=S059

Korean name
- Hangul: 지구촌민속박물관
- Hanja: 地球村民俗博物館
- RR: Jiguchon minsok bangmulgwan
- MR: Chiguch'on minsok pangmulgwan

Global Village Folk Museum (Korean: 지구촌민속박물관) was a museum in Seoul, South Korea. It was located near the mountain Namsan. It opened on August 12, 2004, and closed permanently on November 30, 2016.

== See also ==
- List of museums in Seoul
- List of museums in South Korea
- Korean Folk Village Museum
