= Chojun Textile and Quilt Art Museum =

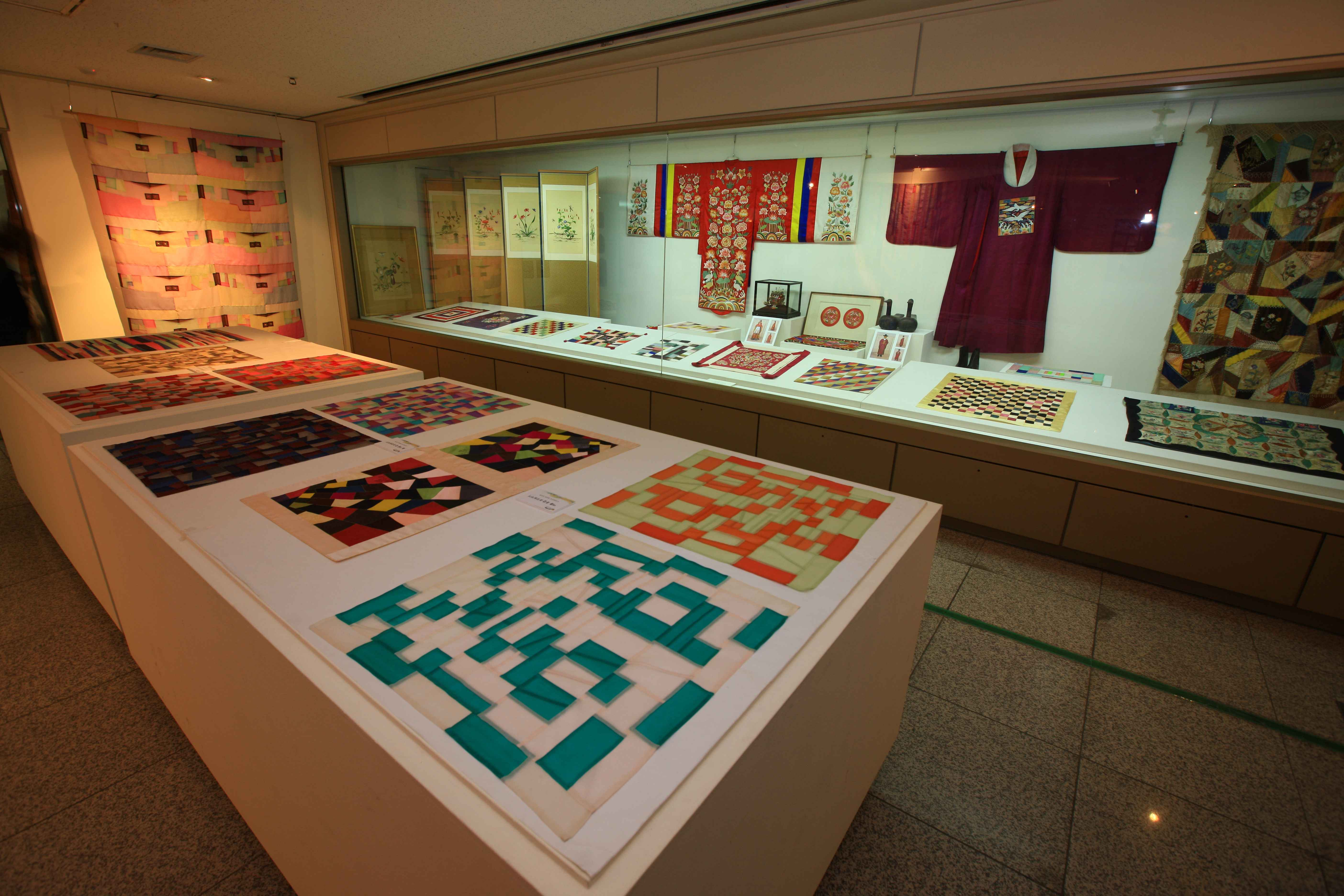
- Established: 27 October 1998
- Location: 29, Toegye-ro 16-gil, Jung District, Seoul, South Korea
- Coordinates: 37°33′29.23″N 126°59′3.19″E
- Type: Textile museum
- Director: Kim Sun-hui

Korean name
- Hangul: 초전섬유퀼트박물관
- Revised Romanization: Chojeon seomyu kwilteu bangmulgwan
- McCune–Reischauer: Ch'ojŏn sŏmyu k'wil'tŭ pangmulgwan

The Chojun Textile and Quilt Art Museum (Korean: 초전섬유퀼트박물관) is a textile museum located in Myeong-dong, Seoul, South Korea.

== See also ==
- List of museums in Seoul
- List of museums in South Korea
