= Daedeokje =

Annual festival in Daegu, South Korea

Daedeokje Korean: 대덕제
- Date: May
- Frequency: Annually
- Locations: Daegu, South Korea

Daedeokje (Korean: 대덕제) is an annual festival held in the city of Daegu in the Nam-gu district, South Korea since 1987. The festival, usually held in early May, consists of a harmony athletic meeting, a contact of Korean classical music and Western music, installation art, guitar concerts, and many more.

== See also ==
- List of festivals in South Korea
- List of festivals in Asia
