= Bongsan Art Fair =

Festival in Daegu, South Korea

- Hangul: 봉산미술제
- Hanja: 鳳山美術祭
- Revised Romanization: Bongsan Misulje
- McCune–Reischauer: Pongsan Misulche

Bongsan Art Fair (Korean: 봉산미술제) is a festival in Daegu, South Korea. The festival, which is held in mid-October, is also the county's only art festival. The Bongsan Art Festival is held simultaneously at 16 art galleries within Bongsan Culture Street and offers a wide range of genres (Oriental paintings, Western paintings, sculpture, crafts, calligraphy works, and installations) for more than 30 artists.

The festival also offers a wide range of attractions, including a celebration performance, a lecture meeting, and a contact event with a writer.

== See also ==
- List of festivals in South Korea
- List of festivals in Asia
