= World Cup Fountain =

Fountain in Seoul, South Korea

Coordinates: 37°32′54″N 126°53′31″E

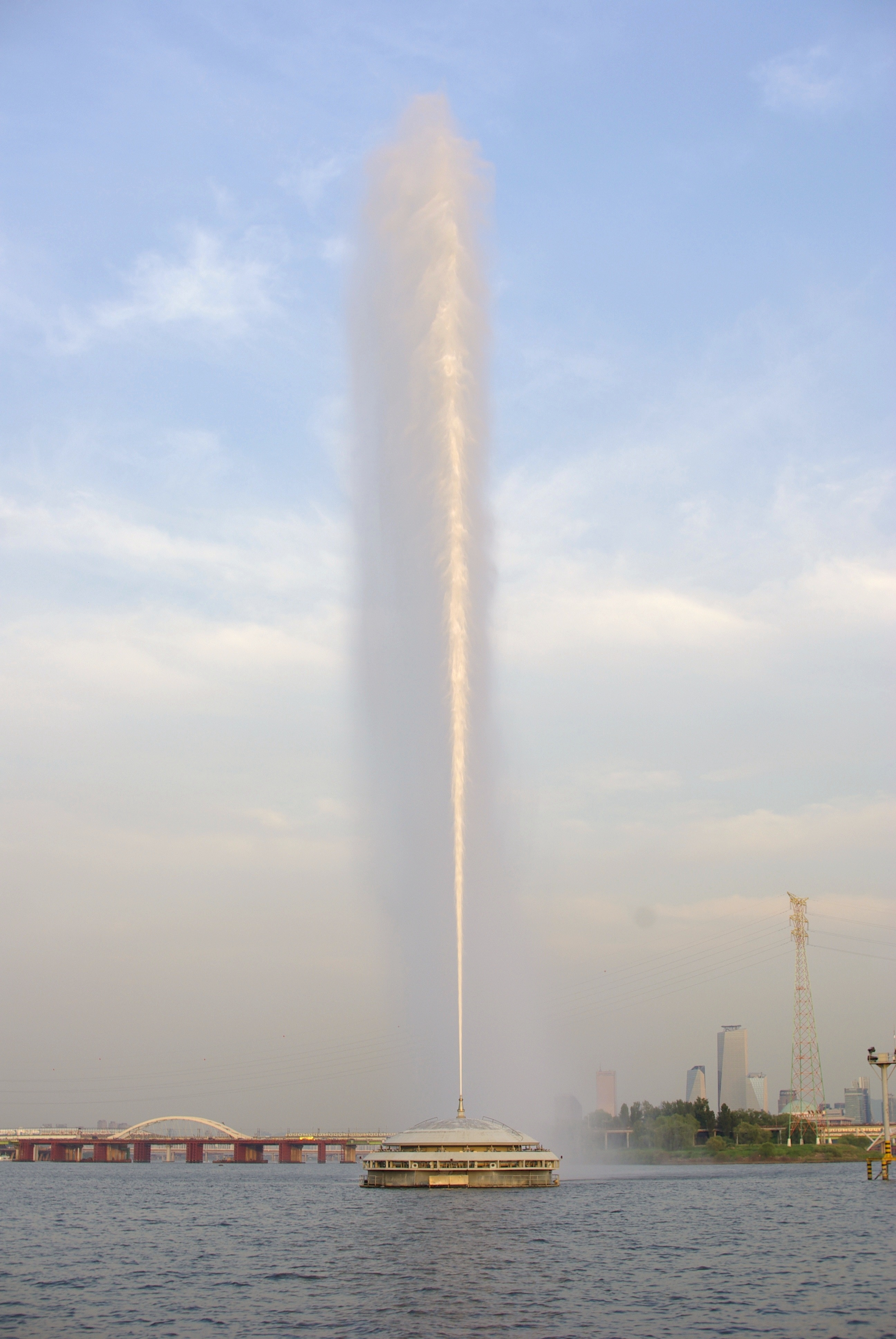
World Cup jet fountain.

The World Cup Fountain (Korean: 월드컵 분수대) was a fountain built to commemorate the 2002 FIFA World Cup co-hosted by South Korea and Japan. The World Cup Fountain is located in the Han River in Seoul, South Korea, between the World Cup Stadium and Seonyudo Park. The fountain jets water at a height of 202 metres (663 ft), a symbolic gesture to the year the FIFA World Cup was held in Seoul. The fountain is taller than the Gateway Geyser, or the fountain in Fountain Hills, Arizona or the Port Fountain in Karachi, Pakistan. For comparison, the Washington Monument in Washington D.C. is 169 meters tall.

The fountain does not flow constantly. It can only be seen for a few hours a day and weather permitting.

== Gallery ==
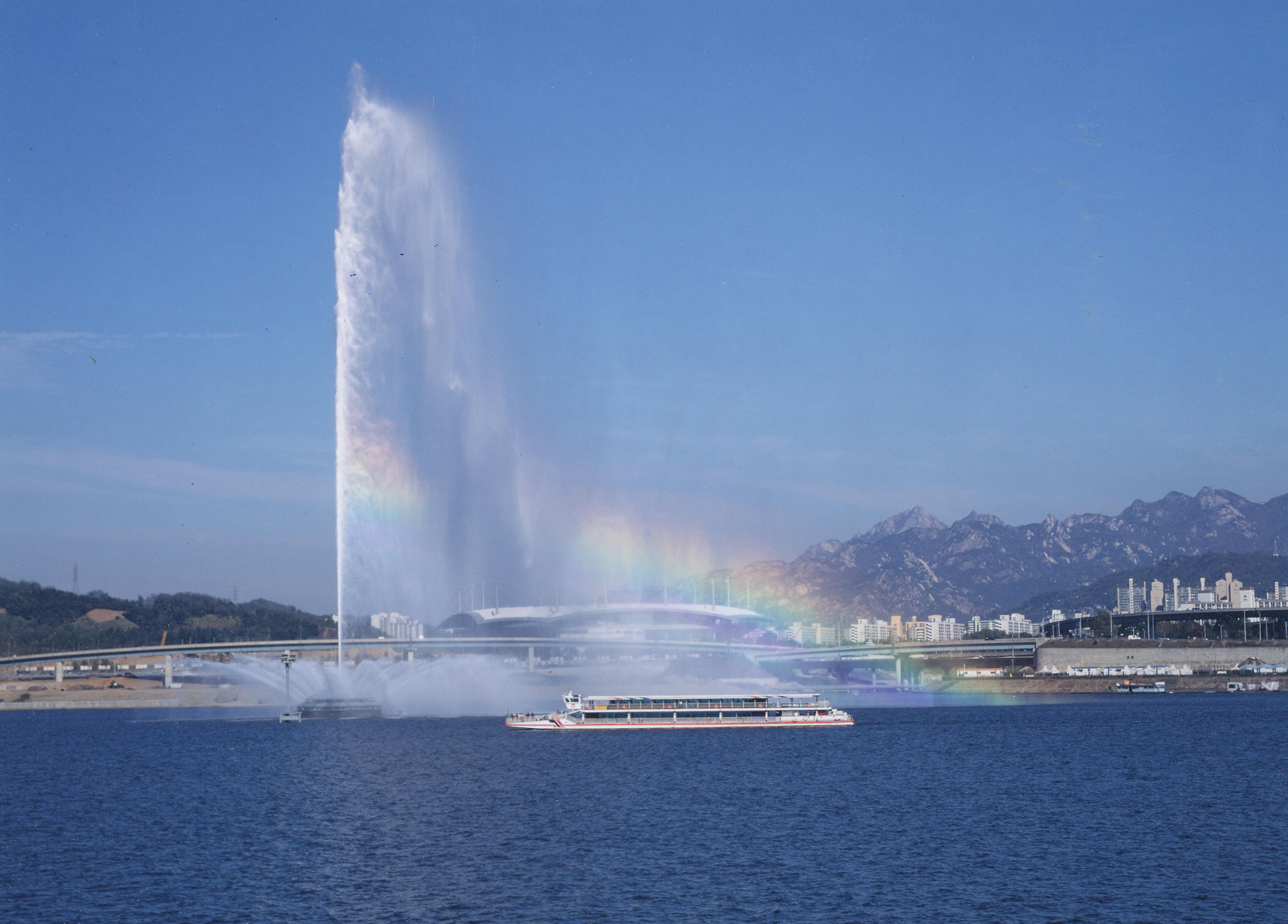
Seoul World Cup Stadium and World Cup Fountain

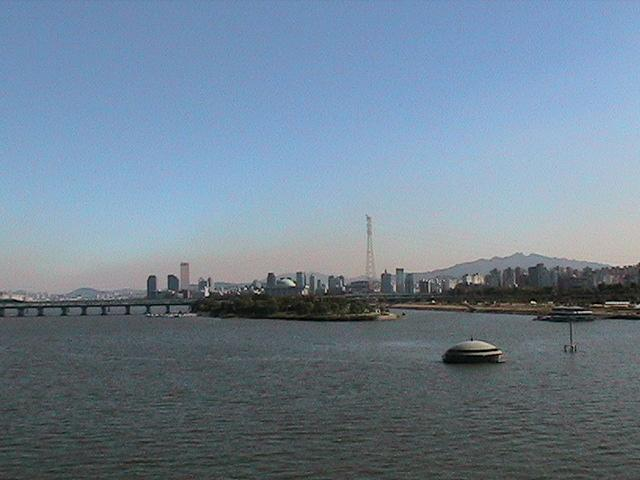
World Cup Fountain not being activated.
