= Gyeongju Tower =

Tower in Gyeongju, South Korea

- Gyeongju Tower
- Interactive map of the Gyeongju Tower area

General information
- Type: Observation tower Exhibition hall
- Location: Gyeongju, South Korea
- Coordinates: 35°50′N 129°17′E
- Construction started: 2004
- Completed: 2007
- Owner: South Korea

Height
- Roof: 82 m (269 ft)

Gyeongju Tower (Korean: 경주타워) is an observation tower located in the Gyeongju Expo Park, Gyeongju, North Gyeongsang Province, South Korea. It was completed on 14 August 2007 along with Gyeongju Expo Culture Center. The tower is with a height of 82 meters as comparable to that of a 30 storied apartment.

== See also ==
- N Seoul Tower
- 63 Building
