= Seonbawi Museum of Art =

Coordinates: 37°27′06.1″N 126°59′57.4″E

The Seonbawi Museum of Art (선바위미술관) is an art museum in Gwacheon, South Korea. It was designed and built on an 800-pyeong site (2644.63 squared metre), by the late artist Lee Seoji in 2004. It is the only folklore museum in South Korea and boasts a permanent collection of approximately 3000 genre and modern paintings, created by Lee Seoji himself. These paintings portray South Korea through the eyes of Lee Seoji himself, as they are based on his own personal experiences.

In 2017, the museum hosted an exhibition of calligrapher Chunpa Hong Deok-seon's works.

The museum is located at 34 Munemi-gil, Gwacheon-si.

== See also ==
- List of museums in South Korea
