= Tibet Museum (South Korea) =

Coordinates: 37°34′48.82″N 126°58′55.59″E

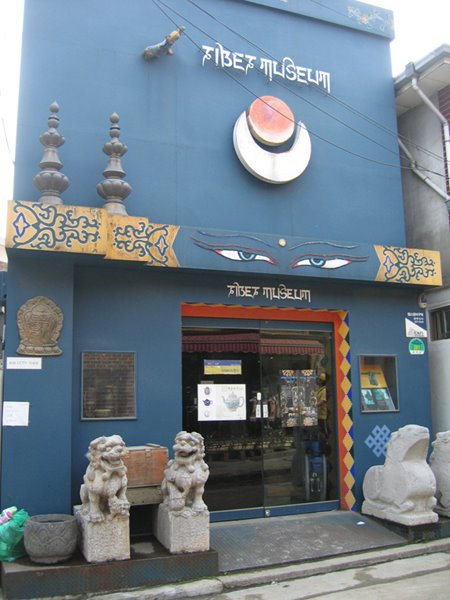
- Established: December 2001
- Location: Sogyeok-dong, Jongno-gu, Seoul, South Korea
- Collection size: 600 artifacts

Korean name
- Hangul: 티베트박물관
- Hanja: 티베트博物館
- RR: Tibeteu bangmulgwan
- MR: T'ibet'ŭ pangmulgwan

The Tibet Museum is a museum dedicated to Tibetan culture in Sogyeok-dong, Jongno-gu, Seoul, South Korea.

== See also ==
- List of museums in South Korea
