= Onggi Folk Museum =

Private museum specializing in Korean earthenware in Seoul, South Korea

Coordinates: 37.6545°N 127.0146°E

- Established: April 1991
- Location: 497-15, Ssangmun 1-dong, Dobong-gu, Seoul, South Korea
- Collection size: 3,300
- Website: onggimuseum.org

Korean name
- Hangul: 옹기민속박물관
- Hanja: 甕器民俗博物館
- RR: Onggi minsok bangmulgwan
- MR: Onggi minsok pangmulgwan

The Onggi Folk Museum, located in Seoul, South Korea is a private museum specializing in onggi, Korean earthenware which is used for storage and utilitarian purposes. It was established as the Goryeo Folk Museum (Korean: 고려민속박물관) in 1991 and later was changed to the current name. The museum consists of three-story building and an outdoor exhibition hall where 3,300 items of onggi and other items such as dancheong patterns, Korean traditional decorative coloring used for building are exhibited.

== See also ==
- List of museums in South Korea
