= World Jewellery Museum =

Jewellery museum in Seoul, South Korea

Coordinates: 37°34′52″N 126°58′55″E

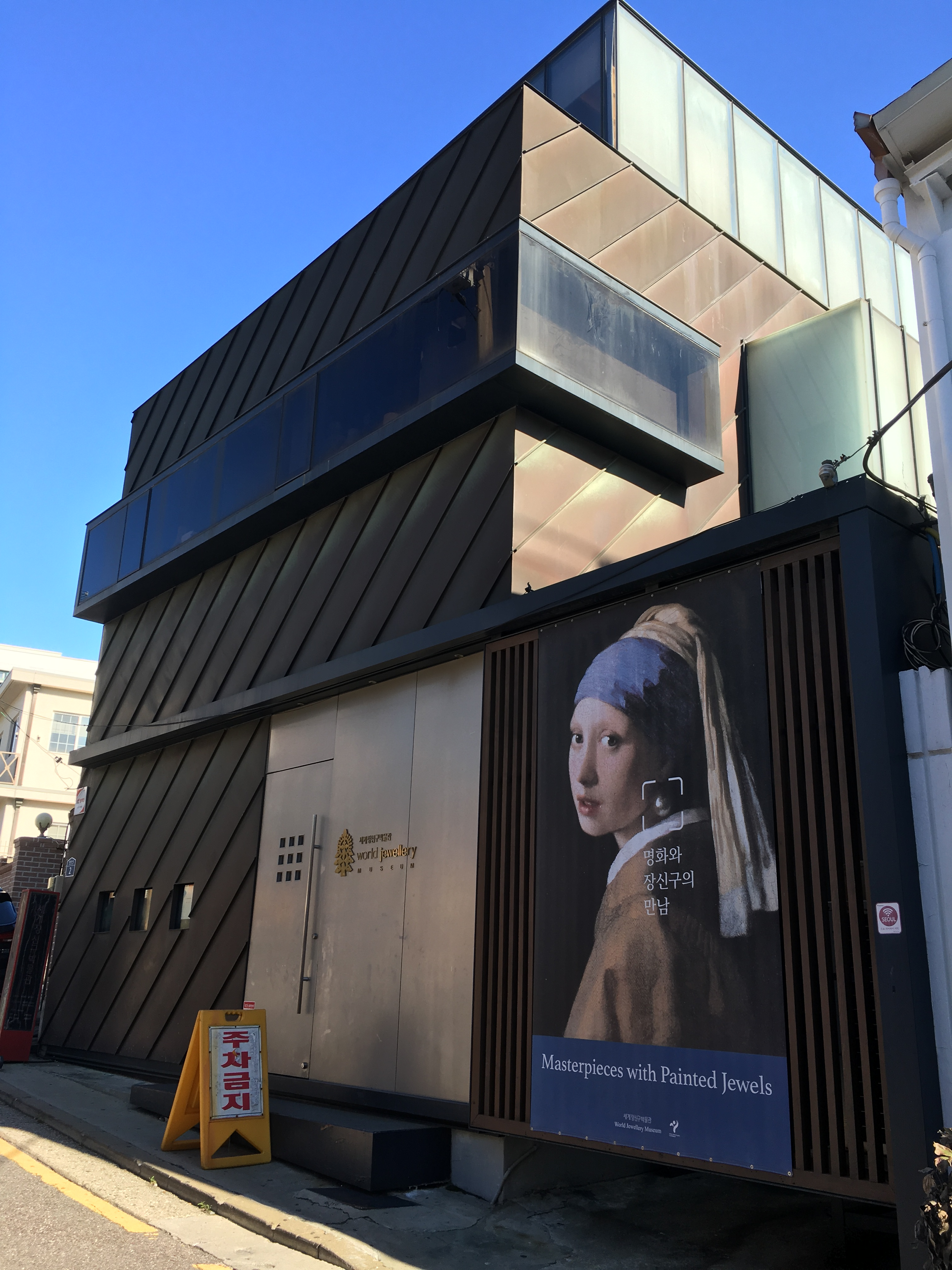
External view of the World Jewellery Museum in September 2018

The World Jewellery Museum is a museum in Seoul, South Korea.

It contains ancient jewelry from Colombia, tribal ivory ornaments from Sudan, a collection of cross ornaments in Ethiopia, ornaments from the Miao people. There are also exhibits of ornaments from Morocco, Cambodia, Mongolia, Eritrea, India and Belgium.

Permanent exhibitions are held on the first floor and special exhibitions are held on the second floor.

From July to October 2008, a special exhibition of Chinese ornaments was held in honor of the 2008 Beijing Olympic Games.

== See also ==
- List of museums in South Korea
