= Sogyeok-dong =

- Interactive map of Sogyeok-dong
- Coordinates: 37.5796°N 126.9809°E
- Country: South Korea

Area
  - Total: 0.06 km^{2} (0.023 sq mi)

Korean name
- Hangul: 소격동
- Hanja: 昭格洞
- RR: Sogyeok-dong
- MR: Sogyŏk-tong

Sogyeok-dong (Korean: 소격동) is a dong (neighbourhood) of Jongno District, Seoul, South Korea. It is a legal dong (법정동 法定洞) administered under its administrative dong (삼청동 行政洞), Samcheong-dong.

== Name ==
Sogyeok-dong derives its name from Sogyeokseo (소격서; 昭格署), a government office in the Joseon dynasty in charge of performing Taoist rites. There were calls to abolish the office from neo-Confucian scholars, and after the Imjin War, it was completely abolished, however the name of the neighborhood remains until today.

== In popular culture ==
Singer-songwriter Seo Taiji was born in this neighborhood, and in 2014 he produced a song titled "Sogyeokdong" in collaboration with IU, another famous singer. The song would be released in two versions, one in Seo's vocals and another in IU's, both of which are successful in the charts and sales.

== Attractions ==
- Kyujanggak
- Art Sonje Center

== See also ==
- Administrative divisions of South Korea
