= Museum of Korean Buddhist Art =

Museum in Seoul, South Korea

The Buddhism Central Museum (former Museum of Korean Buddhist Art) is a Buddhism museum in Wonseo-dong, Jongno District, Seoul, South Korea.

== See also ==
- Korean Buddhist art
- List of museums in South Korea
