= Bukchon Art Museum =

Art museum in Seoul, South Korea

Coordinates: 37.5803°N 126.9846°E

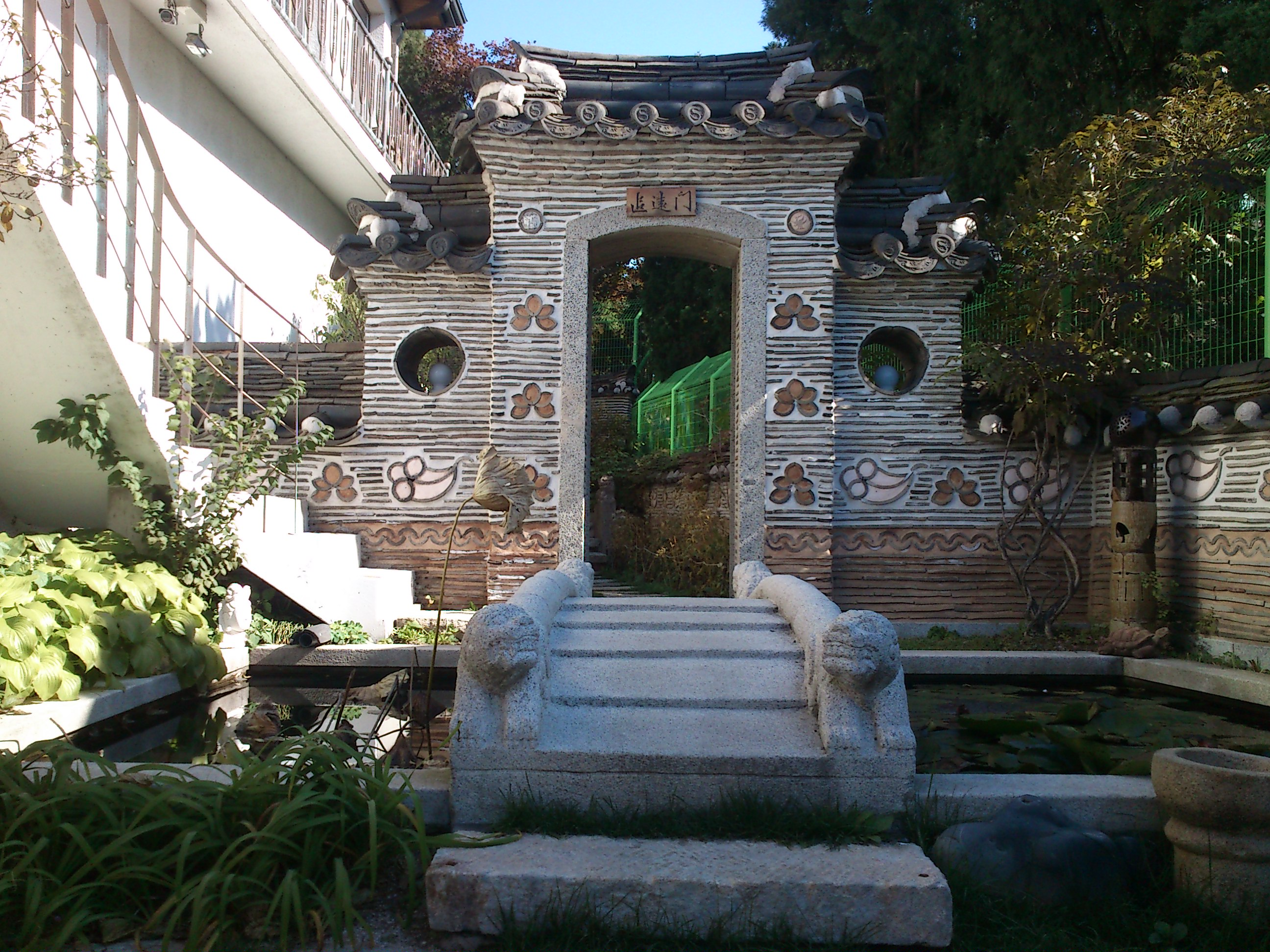
- Established: January 2005
- Location: 1F, Jamiwon Building, 170-12 Gahoe-dong, Jongno-gu, Seoul, South Korea
- Director: Chun Yoon-soo
- Website: bukchonartmuseum.com

Korean name
- Hangul: 북촌미술관
- Hanja: 北村美術館
- RR: Bukchon misulgwan
- MR: Pukch'on misulgwan

Bukchon Art Museum (Korean: 북촌미술관) is an art museum in Seoul, South Korea. It has 150 pieces of Korean modern art, 200 pieces of Chinese art, 2500 of old documents of Joseon dynasty in total of 2850.

== See also ==
- Gahoe Museum
- List of museums in Seoul
- List of museums in South Korea
