= Museum of Korea Straw and Plants Handicraft =

Museum in Seoul, South Korea

Coordinates: 37.5848107°N 126.9977504°E

The Museum of Korea Straw and Plants Handicraft is a handicrafts museum in Myeongnyun-dong, Jongno District, Seoul, South Korea.

== History ==
Museum of Korea Straw and Plants Handicraft was registered on Ministry of Culture and Tourism in 1993 and was located in Cheongdam-dong, Gangnam District, Seoul for 8 years. The museum was then relocated to Myeongnyun-dong in 2001. The founder is "Byung Sun In" who has devoted her whole life to research about handicraft with straw.

== See also ==
- List of museums in South Korea
