= Han Sang Soo Embroidery Museum =

Coordinates: 37.5828°N 126.9855°E

- Established: 2005
- Location: Back Kang B/D 1F 87-1 Seongbuk-lo Seongbuk-Gu Seoul
- Type: art museum
- Collection size: 100 pyeong (330 m^{2})

Korean name
- Hangul: 한상수 자수박물관
- Hanja: 韓尙洙刺繡博物館
- RR: Han Sangsu jasu bangmulgwan
- MR: Han Sangsu chasu pangmulgwan

The Han Sang Soo Embroidery Museum (Korean: 한상수 자수박물관) is an art museum specializing in Korean embroidery located in Seongbuk-lo, Seongbuk-gu, central of Seoul, South Korea. It was established by Han Sang Soo (한상수, born c. 1932), who holds a title as a jasujang (자수장, embroidery artisan), a profession recognized as an Important Intangible Cultural Property by the Cultural Heritage Administration of South Korea.
