= Sinmunno 2-ga =

Korean transcription(s)
  - Hangul: 신문로2가
  - Hanja: 新門路二街
  - Revised Romanization: Sinmunno i ga
  - McCune–Reischauer: Sinmunno i ka
- Interactive map of Sinmunno 2-ga
- Country: South Korea
- District: Jongno District

Area
  - Total: 0.26 km^{2} (0.10 sq mi)

Sinmunno 2-ga (Korean: 신문로2가) is a dong (neighbourhood) of Jongno District, Seoul, South Korea. It is a legal dong (법정동 法定洞) administered under its administrative dong (행정동 行政洞), Sajik-dong.

== Attraction ==
- SeMa GyeongHuiGung

== See also ==
- Administrative divisions of South Korea
