= Posco Art Museum =

Coordinates: 37.5058037°N 127.0539585°E

The Posco Art Museum is a museum in Seoul, South Korea. The museum opened as a gallery in 1995 when POSCO built the POSCO Center in Seoul.

== See also ==
- List of museums in South Korea
- POSCO
