= Museum of Korean Modern Literature =

Museum in Seoul, South Korea

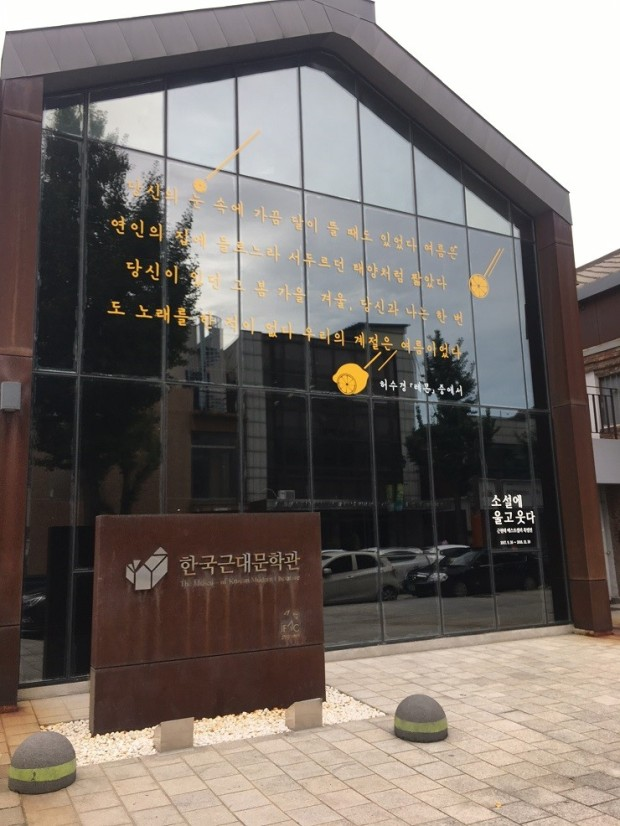

The Museum of Korean Modern Literature is a literature museum in Jangchung-dong, Jung District, Seoul, South Korea. There are numerous xylophone exhibits.

== See also ==
- List of museums in South Korea
