= Gangchang Park =

Public park in Daegu, South Korea

- Interactive map of Gangchang Park
- Coordinates: 35.8524°N 128.4793°E

Korean name
- Hangul: 강창공원
- Hanja: 江倉公園
- RR: Gangchang gongwon
- MR: Kangch'ang kongwŏn

Gangchang Park (Korean: 강창공원), also known as Pasan (파산), is a park located in Dalseo District, Daegu, South Korea. The park features 22 types of facilities for residents, and the Geumho River is located nearby.
