= Hanwon Museum of Art =

Art museum in Seoul, South Korea

- Location: Seocho District, Seoul, South Korea
- Coordinates: 37.48177°N 127.01548°E

The Hanwon Museum of Art (Korean: 한원미술관) is an art museum in Seocho District, Seoul, South Korea.

== Main business ==
- Collection, preservation, management, and exhibition of art materials
- Editing and publishing of art literature
- Professional and academic research on museum materials
- Newsletter and cultural publication business

== See also ==
- List of museums in South Korea
