= Korean Magazine Museum =

Museum in Seoul, South Korea

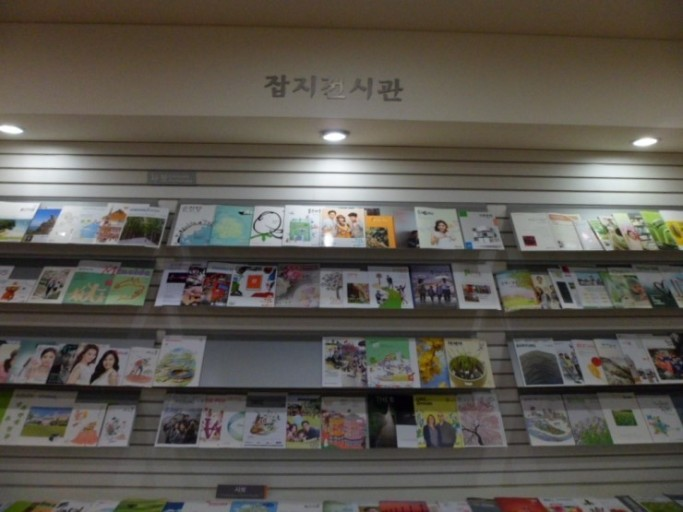

The Korean Magazine Museum is a museum in the district of Yeouido in Seoul, South Korea. It was established on March 21, 2002, to promote Korean magazines in the competitive global arena. The museum consists of three underground floors and seven upperground floors for a total floor space of 1703 pyeong (app. 5,623 m^{2}). Admission is free with opening hours from Monday to Saturday (10:00-18:00). The museum is closed on Sundays and national holidays.

== Facilities ==
- Magazine exhibition space (exhibit of modern magazines)
- Magazine museum (exhibit of rare magazines)
- Internet zone
- Reading space
- Storage

== Location and Transportation ==
Situated near Yeouido Station of Line 5 on the Seoul Metro system, bus stop for intercity buses is Yeouido Full Gospel Church.

== See also ==
- List of museums in South Korea
