= The Museum of Medicine =

South Korean medical museum

Coordinates: 37.5802298°N 127.0349647°E

The Museum of Medicine is a medical museum in Seoul, South Korea.

== See also ==
- List of museums in South Korea
