= Hwa-dong =

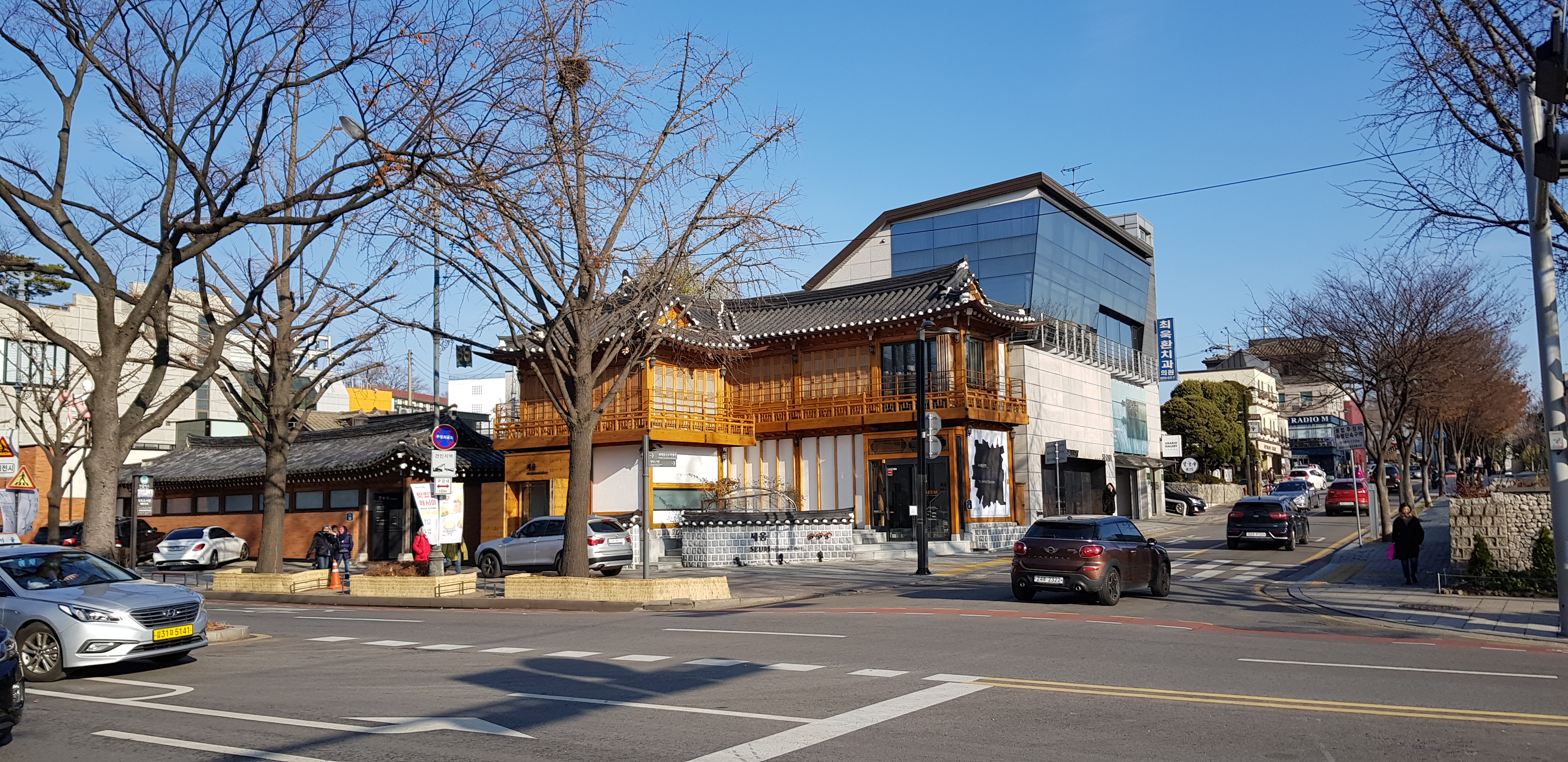
- Interactive map of Hwa-dong
- Country: South Korea

Area
  - Total: 0.06 km^{2} (0.023 sq mi)

Korean name
- Hangul: 화동
- Hanja: 花洞
- RR: Hwa-dong
- MR: Hwa-dong

Hwa-dong (Korean: 화동) is a dong (neighborhood) of Jongno District, Seoul, South Korea. It is a legal dong (법정동 法定洞) administered under its administrative dong (행정동 行政洞), Samcheong-dong.

== See also ==
- Administrative divisions of South Korea

== Sources ==
- 종로구 (Jongno District 鍾路區) (in Korean). Doosan Encyclopedia.
- "Chronicle of Beopjeong-dong and Haengjeong-dong" (in Korean). Guro District Official website. Archived from the original on 6 October 2014.
- "Mapo Information". The chart of Beopjeong-dong assigned by Haengjeong-dong (행정동별 관할 법정동 일람표) (in Korean). Mapo District Official website. Archived from the original on 5 November 2007.
