= Woori Bank Museum =

Numismatics museum in Seoul, South Korea

The Woori Bank Museum is a numismatics museum in Seoul, South Korea.

== See also ==
- Gwangtonggwan
- Bank of Korea Money Museum
- List of museums in South Korea
