= Lotte World Folk Museum =

National museum

Coordinates: 37.511164°N 127.098073°E

Korean name
- Hangul: 롯데월드 민속박물관
- Hanja: 롯데월드 民俗博物館
- Revised Romanization: Rotde Woldeu Minsok Bangmulgwan
- McCune–Reischauer: Rotte Wŏldŭ Minsok Pangmulgwan

The Lotte World Folk Museum is a cultural museum and attraction in Seoul, South Korea.

== See also ==
- List of museums in South Korea
