= ImageRoot Museum =

Museum in Seoul, South Korea

Coordinates: 37.61149°N 126.97667°E

The ImageRoot Museum is a museum in Seoul, South Korea.

== See also ==
- List of museums in South Korea
