= The Museum of Agriculture =

Museum in Seoul, South Korea

- 농업박물관
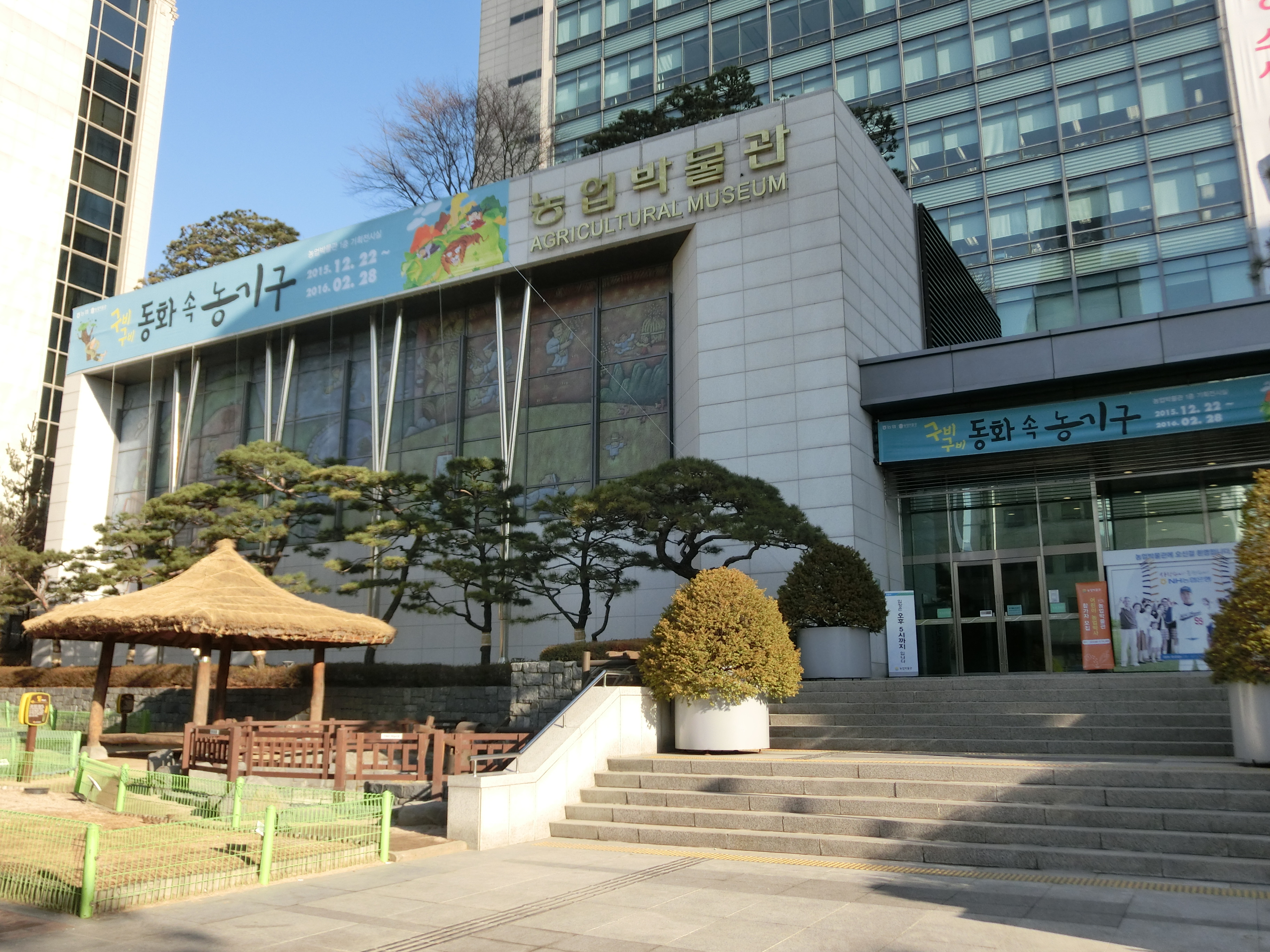
- Established: November 1987
- Location: 75-1 Chungjeongno 1(il)-ga, Jung-gu, Seoul, South Korea
- Website: www.agrimuseum.or.kr

The Museum of Agriculture is a museum in Seoul, South Korea. The museum is built on land once owned by Jong-suh Kim who was the Deputy Prime Minister during the Chosun Dynasty. When Kim owned the land, he would rent out horses for travel. The museum has over 2,400 items regarding Korean agriculture.

== See also ==
- List of museums in South Korea
