= Mokin Museum =

Museum in Seoul, South Korea

Coordinates: 37.57385°N 126.98366°E

The Mokin Museum (Korean: 목인박물관) is a museum in Seoul, South Korea.

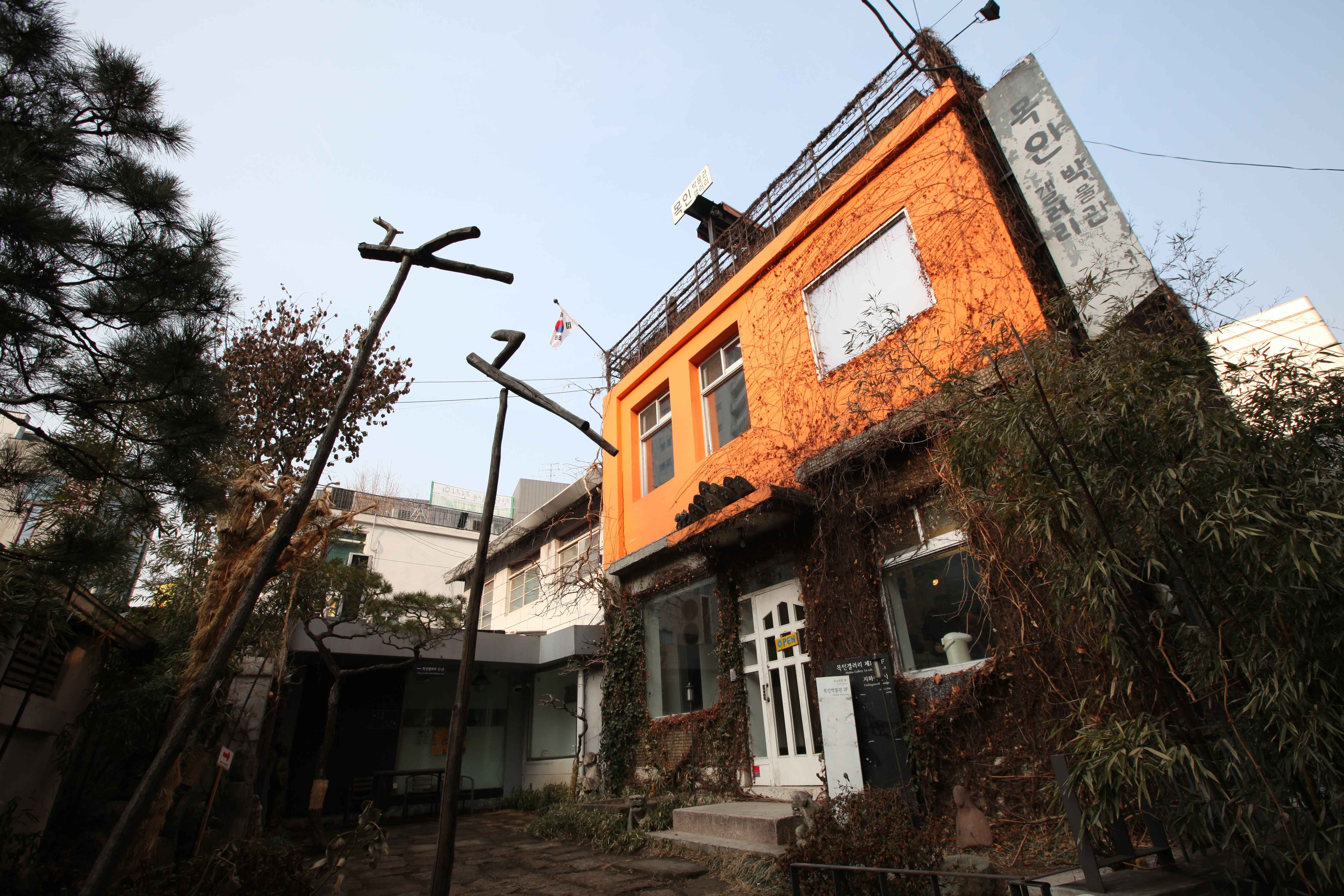
Front entrance in 2013

The Mokin Museum focuses on traditional wooden sculptures and craftsmanship. Situated in Insa-dong, the museum features an underground lounge, an exhibition hall, and a rooftop garden. Its collection showcases traditional Korean wooden sculptures, as well as masks, staffs, and wooden dolls from various parts of Asia. Mokin also organizes a range of exhibitions and events throughout the year.

== See also ==
- List of museums in South Korea
