= Korea Furniture Museum =

Museum in Seoul, South Korea

- Hangul: 한국가구박물관
- RR: Hanguk gagu bangmulgwan
- MR: Han'guk kagu pangmulgwan

The Korea Furniture Museum (Korean: 한국가구박물관) is a furniture museum located in Seongbuk-dong, Seongbuk District, Seoul, South Korea.

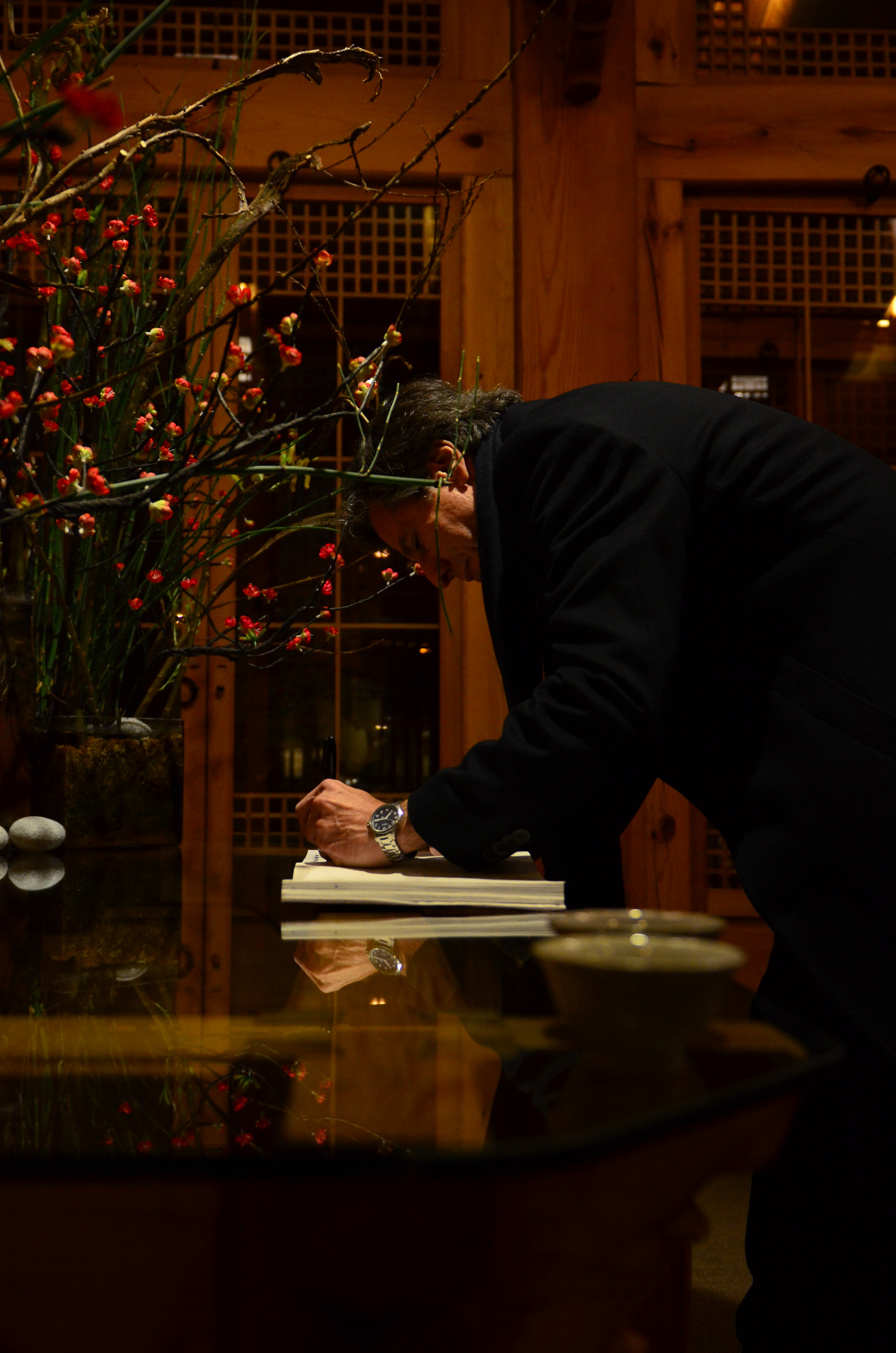
US Secretary of State Tony Blinken visiting the Korea Furniture Museum and signing the guestbook in 2015.

The Korea Furniture Museum, founded in 1993 by Chyung Mi-sook, is a private museum located in the Seongbuk neighborhood which is a "hilly area of luxurious homes". The museum itself is a collection of several traditional aristocratic houses (hanok) "in a village setting designed to illustrate the way the Korean nobility lived during the Joseon dynasty". Chyung Mi-sook had made the decision to present her personal collection of about 2,500 furniture pieces to the public as she has been collecting traditional wooden furniture since the 1960s.

The exhibition hall is consistently being refreshed as it displays about 550 pieces of wooden furniture at a time out of the entire collection. "As well as discovering the localized characteristics of furniture from different parts of the country, visitors can gain an understanding of the general features of traditional Korean furnishings: their aesthetics emphasizing the intrinsic beauty of the raw materials over artificial decorations, thoughtful design taking into consideration the natural contraction and expansion of wood, the overall distribution of weight, and practical structure which makes full consideration of the human scale".

"At the museum, visitors can also experience chagyeong, or "borrowed scenery," one of the definitive characteristics of traditional Korean housing (hanok). Koreans of the past enjoyed the extensive landscapes visible through their windows as if they were private gardens. This traditional technique illustrates a receptive attitude toward nature and, at the same time, a macroscopic view of architecture. People of the time valued geomantic principles and accommodated natural geographic features into their architecture, but they also applied this creative technique of borrowed scenery as a means to not confine the human quarters to within the walls, but expand it as far as the eyes can reach in order to embrace nature".

The Korea Furniture Museum has been visited by many well known figures such as the president of South Korea, spouses of G20 world leaders, Victoria Beckham, architects Frank Gehry and Zaha Hadid and more. In July 2014, General Secretary of the Chinese Communist Party Xi Jinping and his wife, First Lady of China Peng Liyuan, visited for dinner, and were reported to have particularly enjoyed the doenjang-jjigae — a soybean paste soup.

== See also ==
- List of museums in South Korea
