= Paper Art Museum =

Coordinates: 37.5596195°N 127.0061614°E

The Paper Art Museum is a museum in Seoul, South Korea.

== See also ==
- List of museums in South Korea
