= Hwajeong Museum =

Art museum in Seoul, South Korea

Coordinates: 37.60467°N 126.96587°E

The Hwajeong Museum (Korean: 화정박물관) is a museum in Pyeongchang-dong, Jongno District, Seoul, South Korea. Established in 1999, it exhibits a collection of East Asian art from Korea, Japan, China, and Tibet, including over 3,000 paintings, ceramics, and Buddhist artifacts.

== See also ==
- List of museums in South Korea
