= Lock Museum =

Museum in Seoul, South Korea

Coordinates: 37.5798597°N 127.0045505°E

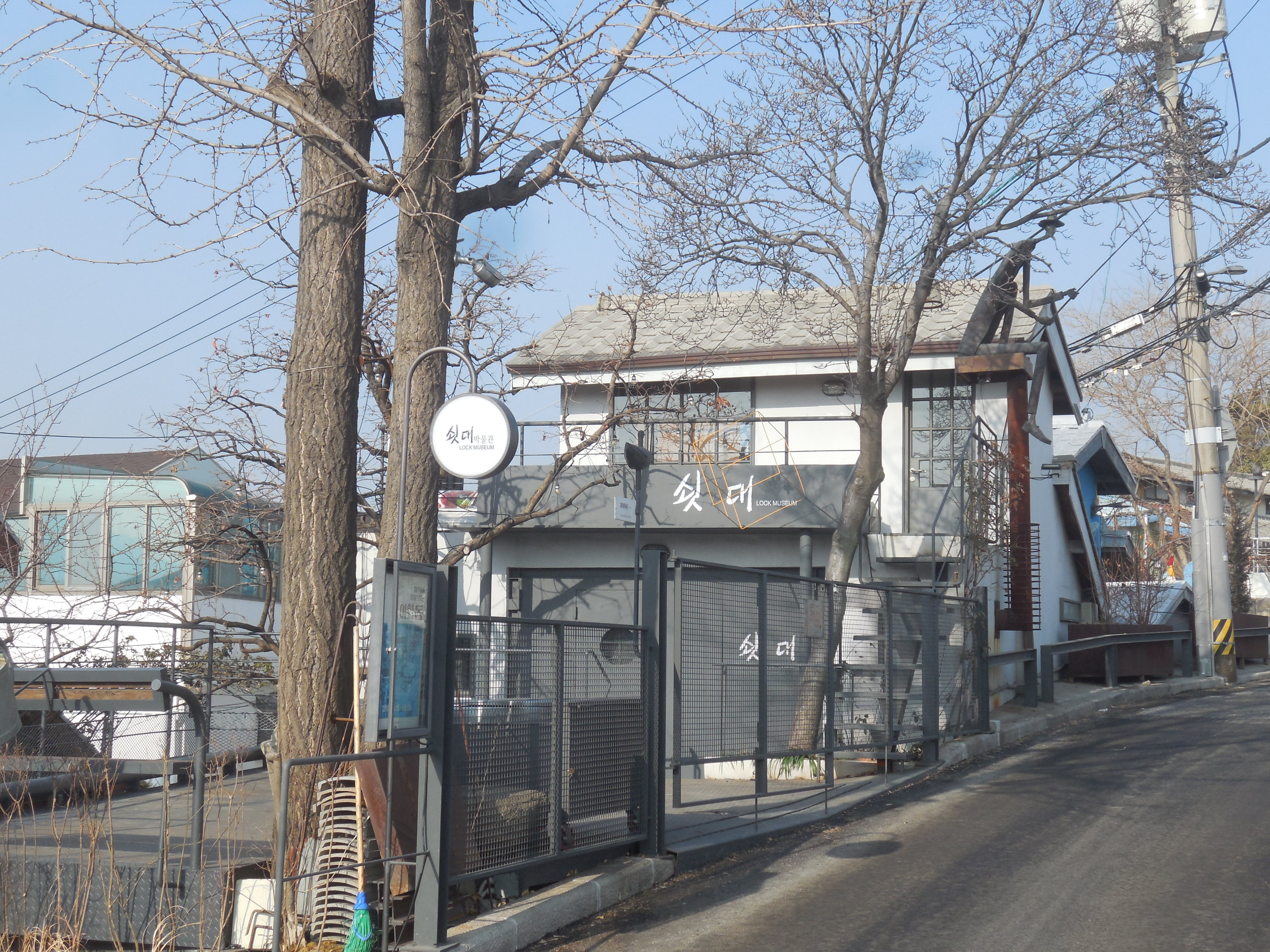
building

The Lock Museum is a private museum in Seoul, South Korea. It is directed by Mr. Hongkyu Choi.

The museum is now in a cafe at the top of Naksan Fortress Wall Trail. Entrance fee is to purchase something at the cafe.

== See also ==
- Talismans of Protection from Chosŏn Korea: Antique Locks, Latches and Key Charms(Special Exhibition at N.Y. until Jan. 2010)
- List of museums in South Korea
