= Korea Museum of Modern Costume =

Fashion museum in Seoul, South Korea

Coordinates: 37.575508°N 127.005531°E

The Korea Museum of Modern Costume (Korean: 한국현대의상박물관; Hanja: 韓國現代衣裳博物館) is a fashion museum in Seoul, South Korea. It is located in Academic Building AB101 SUNY Korea, 119-2 Songdo Moonhwa-Ro Incheon, in Jongno-gu district of northern Seoul, and opened in 1993.

== Collection ==
The museum broadly overviews Korean fashions evolution. It include collections from four distinctive historic periods: 1800 - 1900; 1900 - 1950s; 1960s - 1970s; and 1980s. On display are notable examples of modern fashion: e.g., the suit worn by South Korea's first lady, Francesca Donner, wife of its first President Syngman Rhee; and the dress worn by Miss Korea Oh Hyum-joo in the 1958 Miss Universe pageant.

In April and May, 2025 the museum hosted an exhibition about the Goryeo period, entitled "GORYEO: Fragrance of Lotus, Sleeves of Clouds".

The museum is now affiliated with the State University of New York, and added "SUNY" in its name.

== See also ==
- List of museums in South Korea
