= Dosan Ahn Chang-ho Memorial Hall =

History museum in Seoul, South Korea

Coordinates: 37.52395°N 127.03542°E

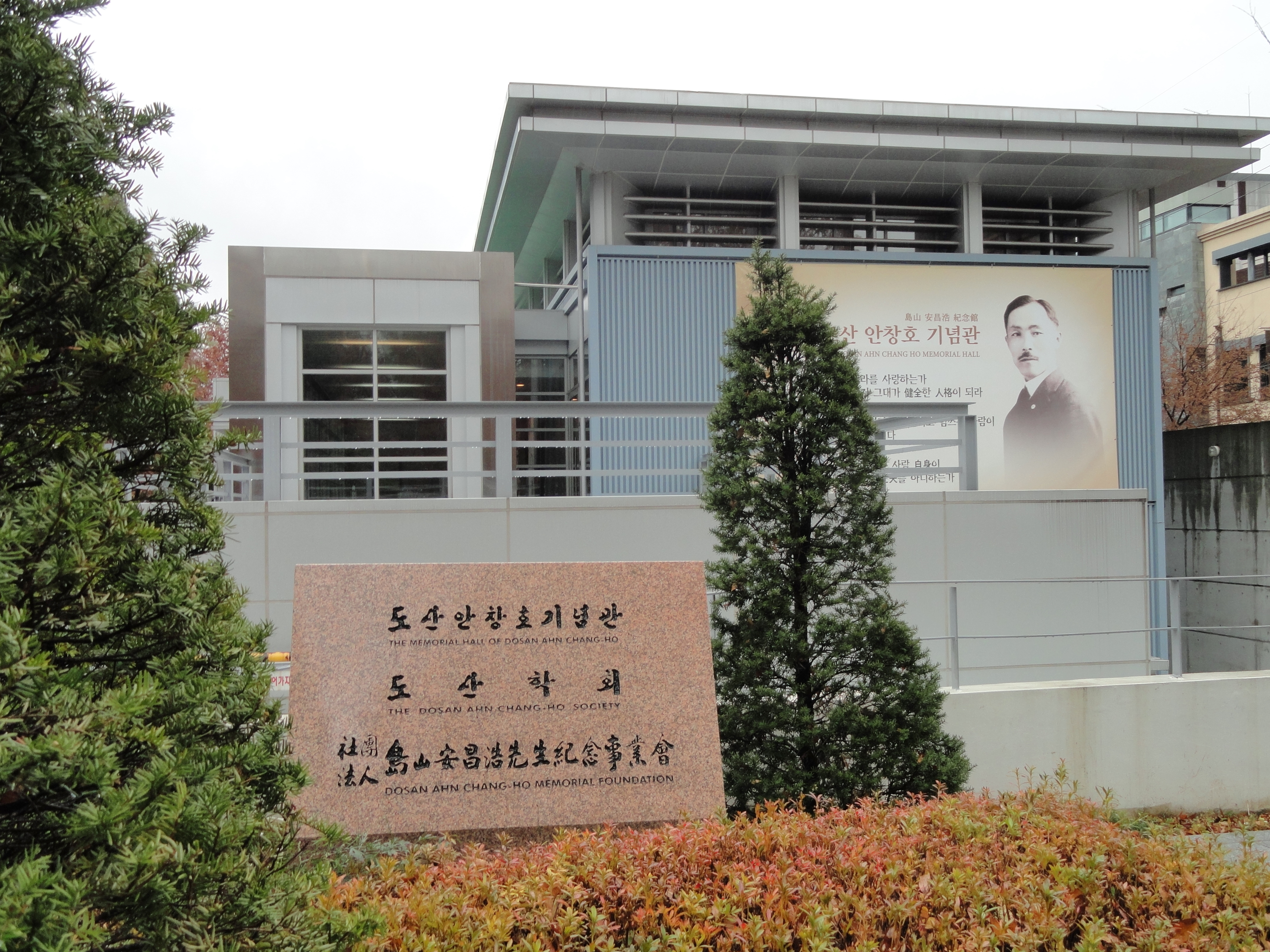
Dosan Ahn Chang-ho Memorial Hall in Dosan Memorial Park - Seoul.

The Dosan Ahn Chang-ho Memorial Hall (Korean: 도산안창호기념관) is a museum in Seoul, South Korea. It commemorates Korean independence activist and early Korean American Ahn Chang Ho.

== See also ==
- List of museums in South Korea
