= Korea Racing Authority Equine Museum =

Horse racing museum in South Korea

Coordinates: 37°26′52″N 127°00′44″E

The Korea Racing Authority Equine Museum (Korean: 말박물관) is a horse museum in Gwacheon, South Korea. Established on September 13, 1988, to complement Equestrian at the 1988 Summer Olympics in Seoul, it has over 50,000 visitors annually in a variety of audiences, ranging from the elderly to children. It has roughly 1,500 exhibits in 123 square meters of showroom space. In 2008, a special exhibition was held running over 100 years of horse racing, and in 2009 hosted modern artwork, including painting, sculpture, ceramics and photographs related to horses.

== See also ==
- List of museums in South Korea
