= Bank of Korea Money Museum =

Economics museum in Seoul, South Korea

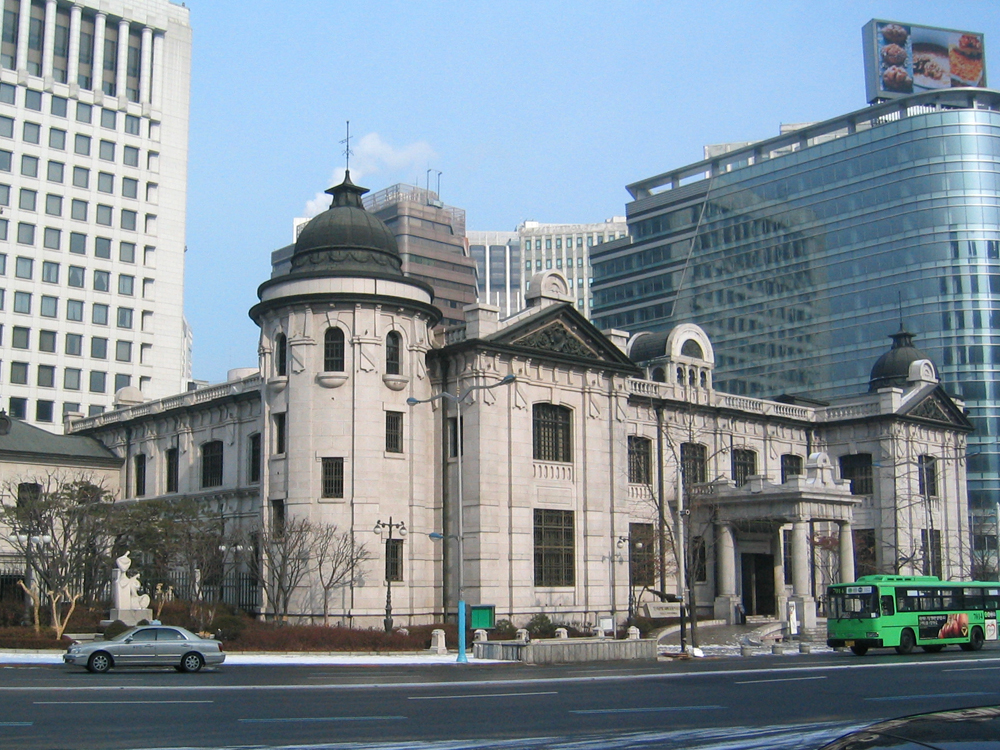
- Established: June 13, 2001
- Location: 39, Namdaemunno, Jung District, Seoul, South Korea
- Coordinates: 37°33′43.20″N 126°58′50.38″E
- Type: Economics and Numismatics
- Directors: JANG, TAEKKYU
- Website: museum.bok.or.kr

Korean name
- Hangul: 한국은행 화폐박물관
- Hanja: 韓國銀行 貨幣博物館
- Revised Romanization: Hanguk Eunhaeng Hwapye Bangmulgwan
- McCune–Reischauer: Han'guk Ŭnhaeng Hwap'ye Pangmulgwan

Bank of Korea Money Museum (Korean: 한국은행 화폐박물관) is an economics and numismatics museum in Seoul, South korea. It was founded by the Bank of Korea in 2001.

The museum is housed in a designated historic building in Seoul, constructed in 1912 and previously the head office of the Bank of Korea.

== Building ==
=== History ===
The museum building, formerly the main and head office of the Bank of Korea (한국은행 본관; 韓國銀行本館), is a protected historic landmark that was designated as National Historic Site No. 280 in 1981. Originally intended as the Seoul branch office for the Dai-Ichi Bank, it was designed by Tatsuno Kingo, a renowned Japanese architect who also designed Tokyo Station and the Bank of Japan building in Tokyo.

The construction started in November 1907, but the building's intended tenant switched during the construction. The building was finally finished in January 1912 as the headquarters for the Bank of Chōsen, the central bank of Korea during the Japanese occupation.

Following the liberation of Korea from the Japanese rule, in 1950 the Bank of Chōsen was dissolved and the Bank of Korea, the central bank of South Korea, was instead established on June 12, 1950; however, the building maintained its status as the head office for the newly formed bank. During the Korean War, the building suffered major damage from air raids, but was repaired from May, 1956 to October, 1958.

Since then, the building was continuously used as the head office for the Bank of Korea until the bank moved its operations to a newly constructed tower located behind this building in 1987. From 1987 to 1989, the facade and roof of the building were restored to their original design, while the interior was somewhat altered by replacing plaster with marble. The last office of the Bank of Korea left this building in December 2000, and the building was converted and opened as Bank of Korea Money Museum on June 13, 2001.

=== Architecture ===
Designed in an early 20th-century eclectic style, the museum building was partly inspired by a French chateau and French Renaissance architecture. It features a symmetrical and centralized layout with a floor area of 8703.5 square meters. While constructed mainly in concrete and steel, the outer walls were entirely made in granite harvested outside Heunginjimun Gate in Seoul.

The main entrance is greatly protruded from the facade to accommodate automobiles and is supported by four Tuscan order columns, while the three out of four corners of the building are respectively flanked by three towers with domes and finials. The lower section of the building's facade is decorated with a series of horizontal lines formed by protruding granite blocks, and the upper section of the building is decorated with detailed pediments, a dark-colored cornice, and balustrades. Pilasters were also used, each adorned with a granite carving of a shield.

== See also ==
- List of museums in Seoul
- List of museums in South Korea
- Bank of Korea
