= Pyeongchang-dong =

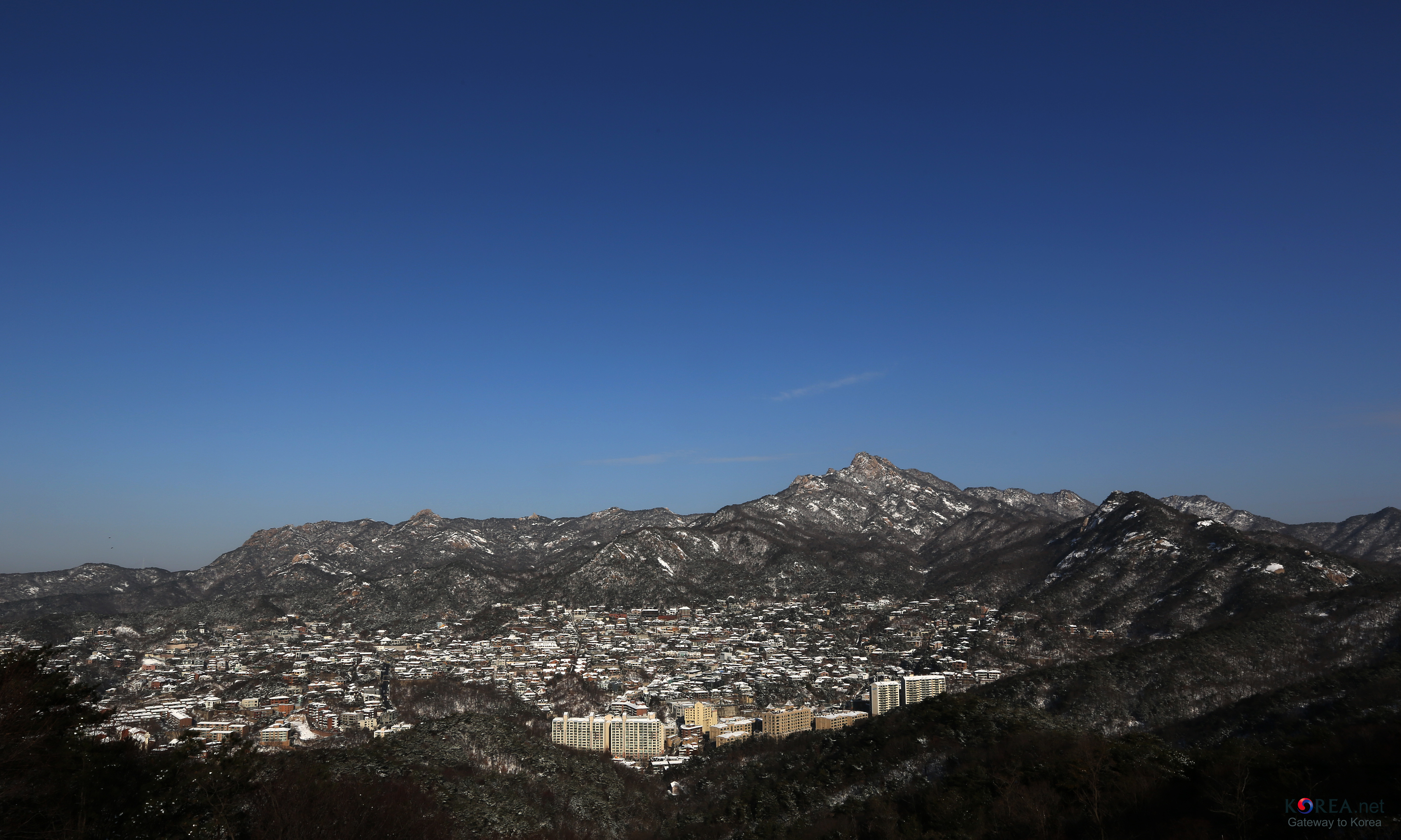
- Interactive map of Pyeongchang-dong
- Country: South Korea

Area
  - Total: 8.92 km^{2} (3.44 sq mi)

Population (2025)
  - Total: 17,131
  - Density: 1,920/km^{2} (4,970/sq mi)

Korean name
- Hangul: 평창동
- Hanja: 平倉洞
- RR: Pyeongchang-dong
- MR: P'yŏngch'ang-dong

Pyeongchang-dong (Korean: 평창동) is a dong (neighbourhood) of Jongno District, Seoul, South Korea.

Sometimes called the "Beverly Hills of Seoul" (a title shared with but more prominently held by the Gangnam District), due to it being a preferred residential location for Korean celebrities, it still remains a common location used in Korean films and television. It is unusual to most communities in Seoul, in that it is nestled in the Bugak Mountains, being surrounded on almost all sides, having the feeling of a wooded resort-like suburb. Many multi-story American style homes fill the community, even though being primarily mountainous, with roads as steep as those in San Francisco.

== See also ==
- Administrative divisions of South Korea
