= Rakkojae =

Traditional hotel in Seoul, South korea

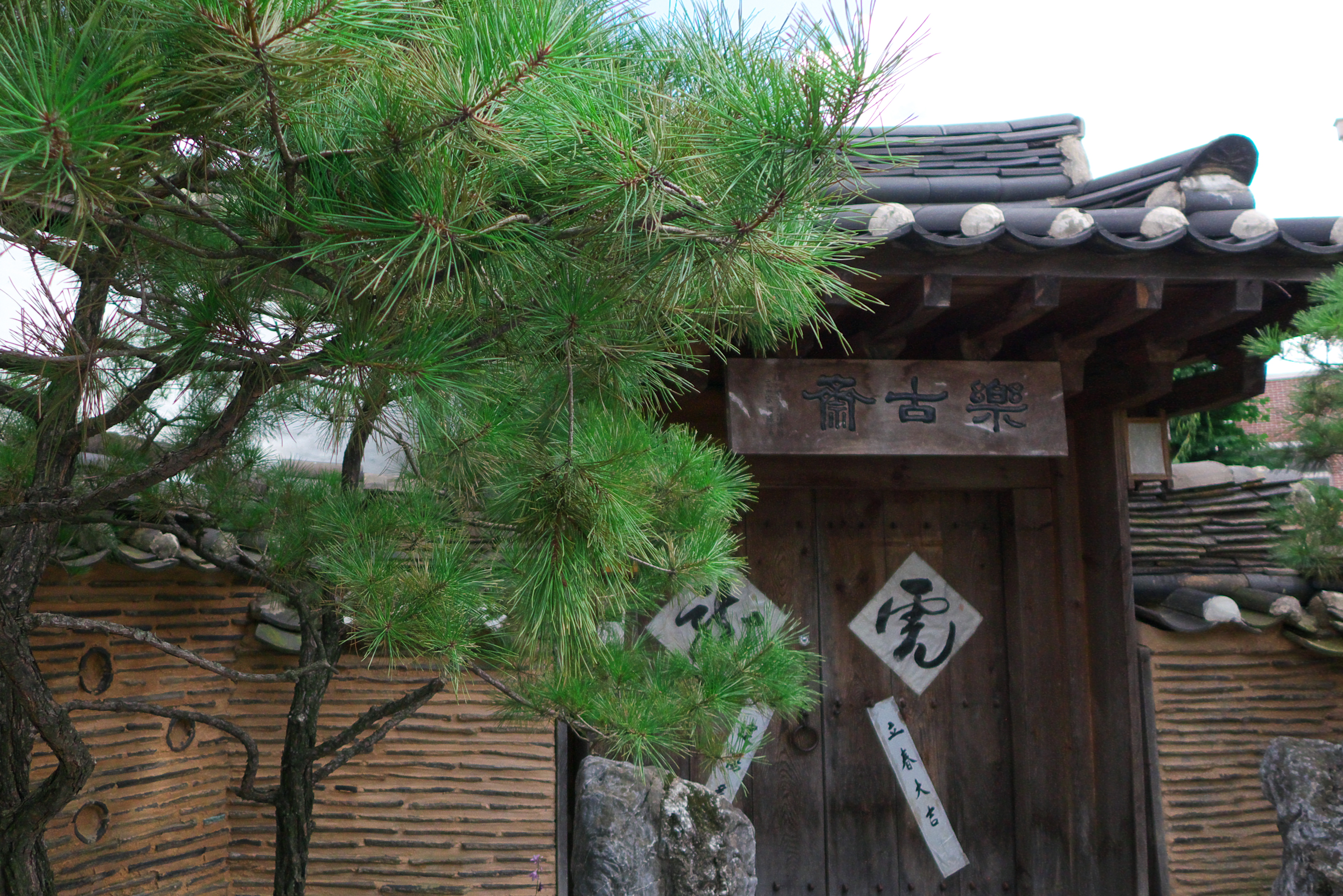
- Established: May 19, 2003
- Location: 98 Gye-dong, Jongno-gu, Seoul, South Korea
- Coordinates: 37.5802°N 126.9858°E
- Director: Michael Jiwon Ahn
- President: Young Hwan Ahn
- Website: http://www.rakkojae.com

Korean name
- Hangul: 락고재
- Hanja: 樂古齋
- RR: Rakgojae
- MR: Rakkojae

Rakkojae (Korean: 락고재; lit. 'a house to enjoy the old') is a South Korean cultural center located in the Bukchon Hanok Village of Jongno-gu, Seoul, established with the purpose for foreign visitors to experience Korean culture in a hanok (한옥) or Korean traditional house. It began operations as a traditional hotel in 2003, a year after the 2002 FIFA World Cup held by South Korea and Japan. Rakkojae was the first instance where a hanok was re-purposed for use as a hotel.

Rakkojae Seoul is a building with a 130-year history and was restored by Korean Human National Treasure, Master Carpenter Young Jin Chung in 2003. The hotel is actually a compound of three hanok, one in a 'ㄱ' shape, one in a 'ㄷ' shape, and one in a single-unit patio style. Rakkojae Seoul was the first hanok hotel to be listed in the first edition of the Michelin Seoul guide in 2017.

Rakkojae Andong (Hahoe) opened its doors in Andong within the Hahoe Folk Village in 2009. On July 31, 2010, the Hahoe Folk Village was inscribed on UNESCO's World Heritage List, receiving international recognition for its cultural value. The entire village had long been designated as Korean Important Folk Property #122 for having preserved its ancient form and traditions for the past 600 years. This hotel is built in a different style of Korean traditional housing called choga, which historically was used as dwellings for commoners.

== See also ==
- Bukchon Hanok Village
- Namsangol Hanok Village
- Korean Folk Village
- Hahoe Folk Village
- Yangdong Village of Gyeongju
