= Bukchon Hanok Village =

Neighborhood in Seoul, South Korea

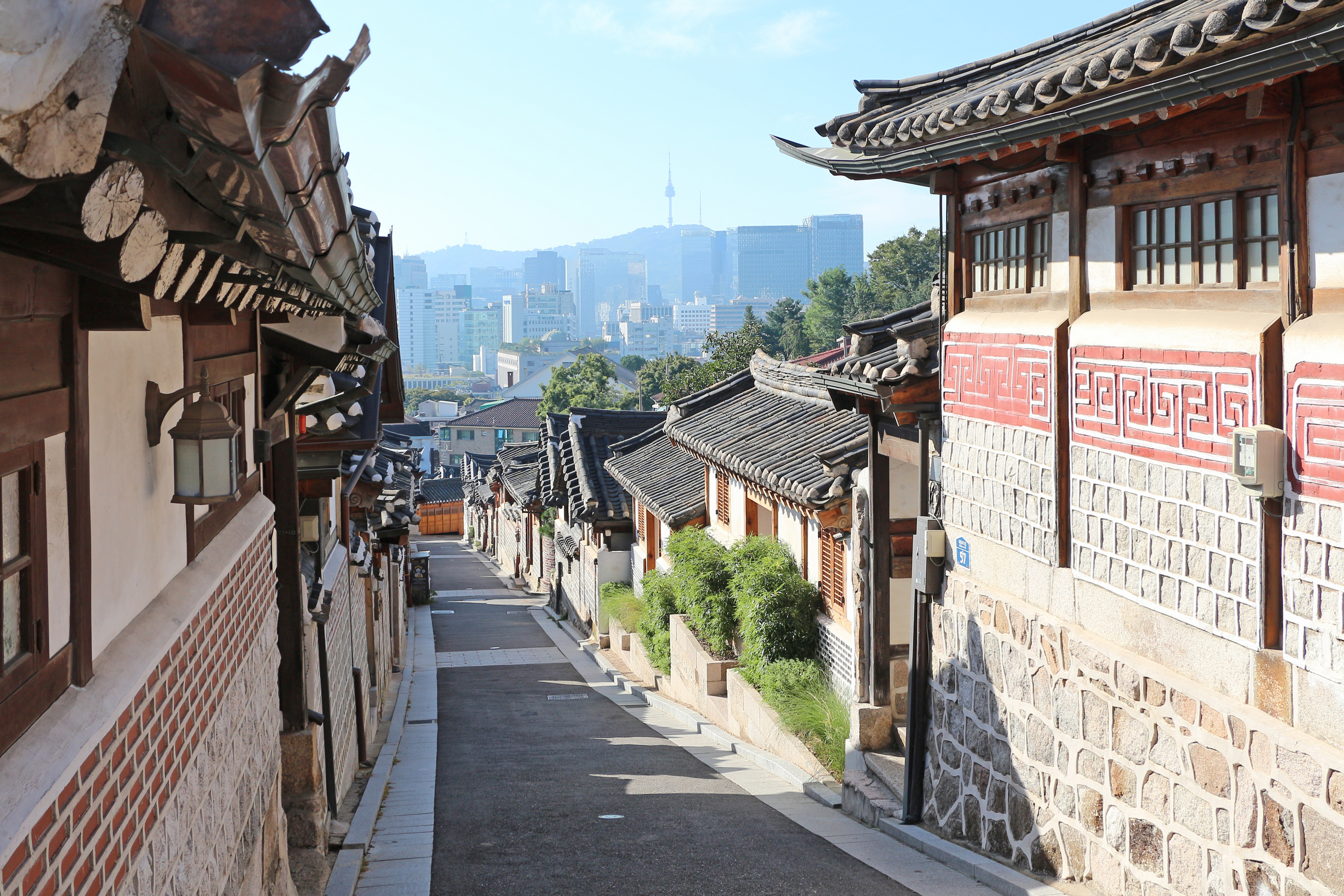
- Part of the village (2022)
- Interactive map of Bukchon Hanok Village
- 37°34′59″N 126°59′01″E
- Location: Jongno District, Seoul, South Korea

History
- Original use: Neighborhood for the aristocracy

Site notes
- Website: hanok.seoul.go.kr (in English)

Korean name
- Hangul: 북촌한옥마을
- Hanja: 北村韓屋마을
- RR: Bukchon hanok maeul
- MR: Pukch'on hanok maŭl

Bukchon Hanok Village (Korean: 북촌한옥마을) is a residential neighborhood in Jongno District, Seoul, South Korea. It has many restored traditional Korean houses, called hanok. This has made it a popular tourist destination.

The area contains many hanok that date to the late 19th and early 20th centuries. During the rapid redevelopment of Seoul, efforts were made to preserve the hanok. The area experienced a boom in popularity with domestic and international tourists in the late 2000s. In 2024, the area received 6.4 million visitors, compared to the around 6,100 residents in the village.

Residents and the local government have put policies and notices up to manage problems relating to overtourism. As of January 2025, visitors that are not staying in guesthouses in the area can only enter between 10 a.m. and 5 p.m. All visitors are asked to be considerate of people living in the homes.

== Description ==
The area of Bukchon, which means "north village", is so named because it is located north of the stream Cheonggyecheon and Jongno. The area consists of the neighborhoods Wonseo-dong, Jae-dong, Gye-dong, Gahoe-dong and Insa-dong.

In 2014, there were about 920 hanok institutions for commercial use. Artisan businesses like Kum Bak Yeon, which works with gold leaf on clothing, are found in some of these.

The number of people who reside in the area has decreased in the 2010s. There were 8,719 residents in 2012, 7,438 in 2017, and around 6,100 in 2024.

Regulations have been put in place to manage the high volume of tourists in the area. For instance, beginning in November 2024, tourists are only allowed to enter the village from 10 a.m. to 5 p.m (excluding tourists staying in guesthouses). Residents have posted various notices asking that tourists respect their privacy and manage their noise levels. The Seoul tourism website advises visitors to keep noise levels to a minimum, avoid littering, keep group sizes small (fewer than 10 people per group), and respect the privacy of each home.

== History ==
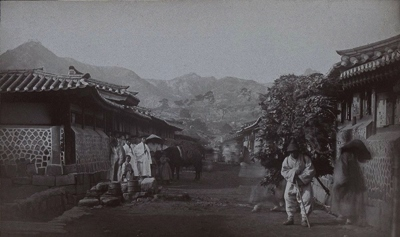
Bukchon around 1883 and 1884

The area was traditionally the residential quarter of high-ranking government officials and nobility; a family register in 1906 recorded that 43.6% of its population were such people. Many notable figures of the late Joseon and Korean Empire periods resided in large houses in the area, including Pak Yŏnghyo and Kim Okkyun. A number of such figures that contributed to the Japanese colonization of Korea received rewards from the Japanese that enabled them to expand their estates in Bukchon.

=== Colonial period and redevelopment ===
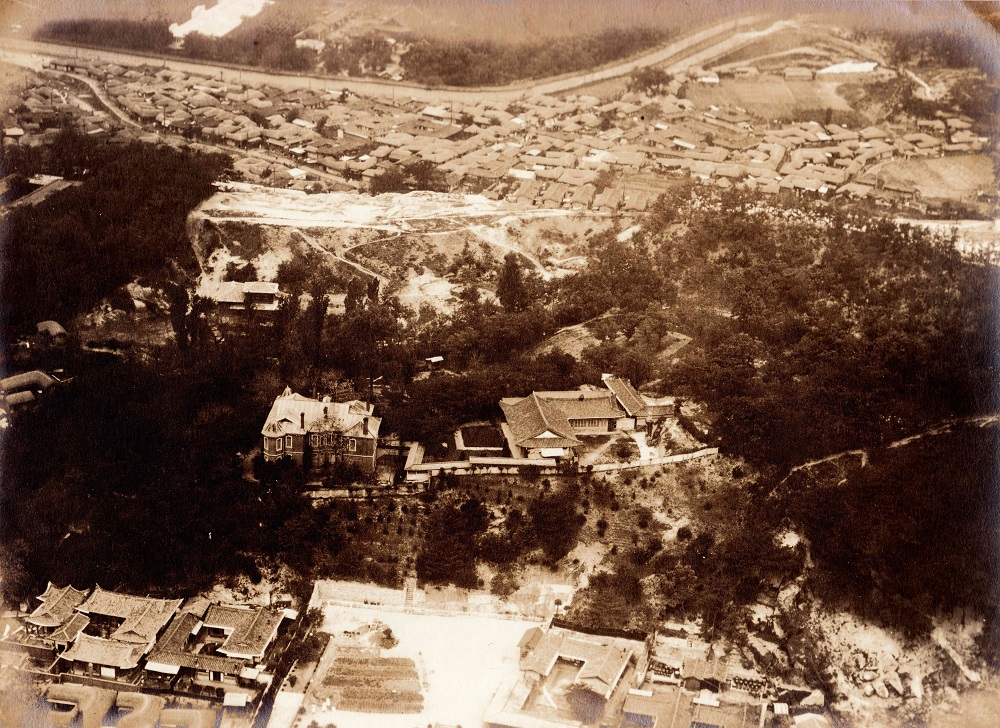
Gahoe-dong (now part of Bukchon Hanok Village) in the 1910s. The houses of politicians Yi Chaewan and Min Yŏnghwi are visible.

In the early colonial period, Seoul's population rapidly increased and a housing shortage emerged. In addition, around the 1920s, an increasing number of Japanese settlers began acquiring land from and displacing Koreans in the Bukchon area.

Korean real estate developer Chŏng Segwŏn was responsible for much of the current Bukchon Hanok Village. Around 1920, he established the first Korean-owned modern real estate company: Kŏnyangsa (건양사). According to Chŏng's descendants, he intentionally focused on redeveloping the Bukchon area in order to prevent it from being taken over by Japanese people. According to Chŏng's daughter, he intentionally built hanok instead of Japanese-style buildings, despite pressure from the colonial government. The hanok were modernized, with amenities such as glass windows and electricity. These houses were often smaller than the houses previously owned by the elites. This enabled Koreans of various economic backgrounds to move into the area. Unlike many Korean businessmen of the time (who tended to be pro-Japanese), he then used the proceeds to fund various Korean nationalist efforts, such as the Korean Language Society. He was eventually punished after the 1942 Korean Language Society incident; he was tortured and much of his property was confiscated by the colonial government.

=== Liberation of Korea and preservation efforts ===
Hanok continued to be built in high density in the area through the liberation of Korea in 1945 until the early 1960s.

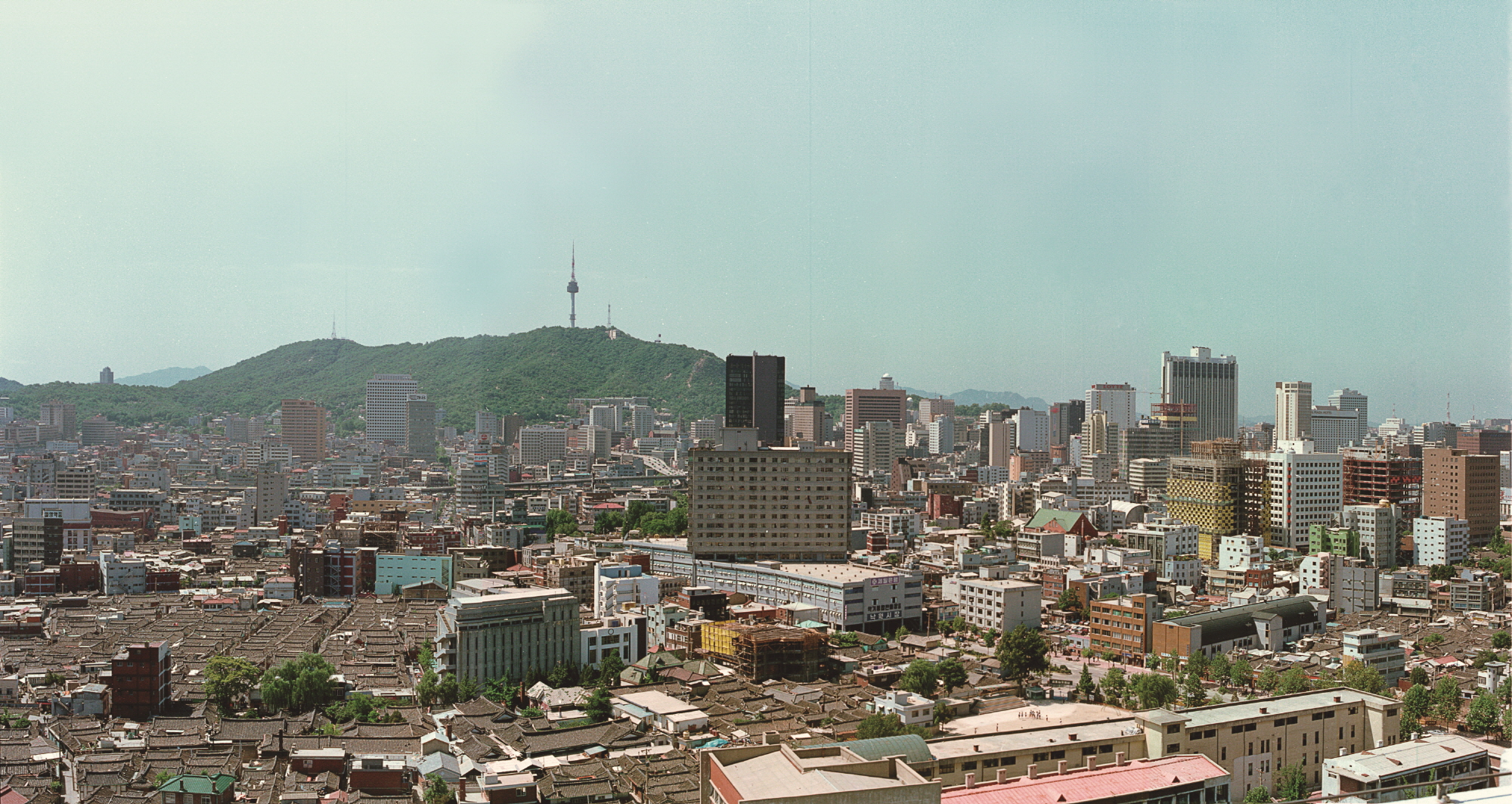
Looking south over the village (bottom left; 1982)

In the late 1960s and early 1970s, the character of the area changed rapidly. The Gangnam area (south of the Han River) began to be redeveloped, and many institutions in the Bukchon area began to move there. This includes Kyunggi High School (former site is now Jeongdok Public Library) and Changduk Girls' High School (former site is now the Constitutional Court of Korea). In 1976, the area was designated a folk landscape (민속경관지역). It received two more similar designations in 1977 (최고고도지구 and 역사문화미관지구(제4종 미관지구)). This resulted in a 1983 designation for the area (한옥보존지구; 韓屋保存地區) that restricted the new construction of modern buildings. The number of stories allowed for new buildings was strictly limited; one story for single-family homes, two for multi-family, and three for commercial buildings. These restrictions became seen as overly restrictive by a portion of the residents; their pushback eventually resulted in the easing of some restrictions in May 1991. In 1994, responsibility for managing these standards was transferred from the Seoul Metropolitan Government to the government of Jongno District, and height restrictions were further eased. However, this caused more hanok to be demolished and made into multi-story homes. Major development projects in 1993 and 1996 resulted in the demolition of dozens of hanok.

To prevent the further loss of hanok, policies regulating the area were completely revised in 1999 and further revisions were made in 2001. While previous regulations were made from the top down, new regulations and efforts were designed to incorporate the opinions of residents. A writer for the Encyclopedia of Korean Folk Culture evaluated these efforts as relatively successful.

=== Recent history ===
Bukchon-ro 11th Street (2026)

According to data by the Bukchon Traditional Culture Center, 30,000 people visited the area in 2007. However, after the village was featured in television programs, such as 2 Days & 1 Night and Personal Taste, the number rose to 318,000 in 2010. Between October 2016 and June 2017, the Tourism Research Institute reported that an estimated 37,100 people visited during the week and 54,200 people visited on weekends. In 2024, the area received 6.4 million visitors. The large number of visitors, especially compared to the small number of residents, has resulted in complaints of overtourism. From 2018 to 2023, the population of the village dropped 27.6% and the number of complaints from residents increased from 56 to 202.

== Transport ==
- Anguk station (Line 3)

== See also ==
- Namsangol Hanok Village
- Korean Folk Village
- Hahoe Folk Village
- Yangdong Folk Village
- Jeonju Hanok Village
- Rakkojae
