= Wonseo-dong =

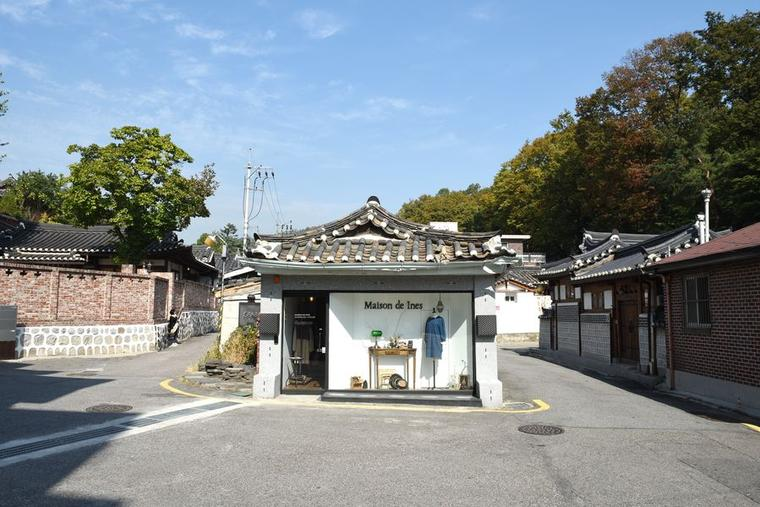
- Wonseo-dong Gongbang-gil street

- Location within Seoul
- Country: South Korea

Korean name
- Hangul: 원서동
- Hanja: 苑西洞
- RR: Wonseo-dong
- MR: Wŏnsŏ-dong

Wonseo-dong (Korean: 원서동) is a dong (neighbourhood) of Jongno District, Seoul, South Korea. It is a legal dong (법정동 法定洞) administered under its administrative dong (행정동 行政洞), Gahoe-dong.

== Tourism ==
Wonseo-dong is located between Changdeokgung Palace and Bukchon Hanok Village, where traditional Korean houses called hanok are clustered. Some of these houses have been converted to cafes, restaurants, studios, workshops, and outlets of indie and designer brands. Its serene, traditional atmosphere made it a popular location for K-dramas to film. Wonseo-dong is also home to a Joseon-era laundry site, where maids would do their laundry.

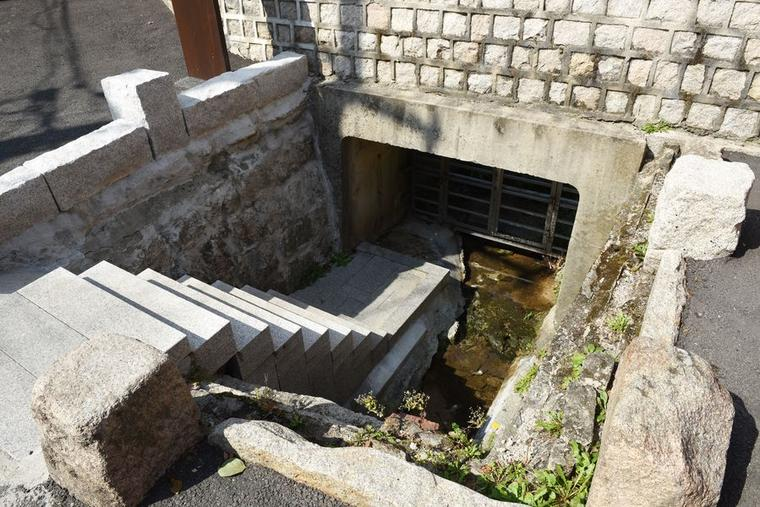
The stone steps of the public laundry site

The neighborhood is listed as one of the Bukchon 8 Views (북촌 8경; 北村八景), a tourist itinerary that is often used to visit eight scenic spots across the village.

== See also ==
- Administrative divisions of South Korea
