= Housing in South Korea =

Korean housing style

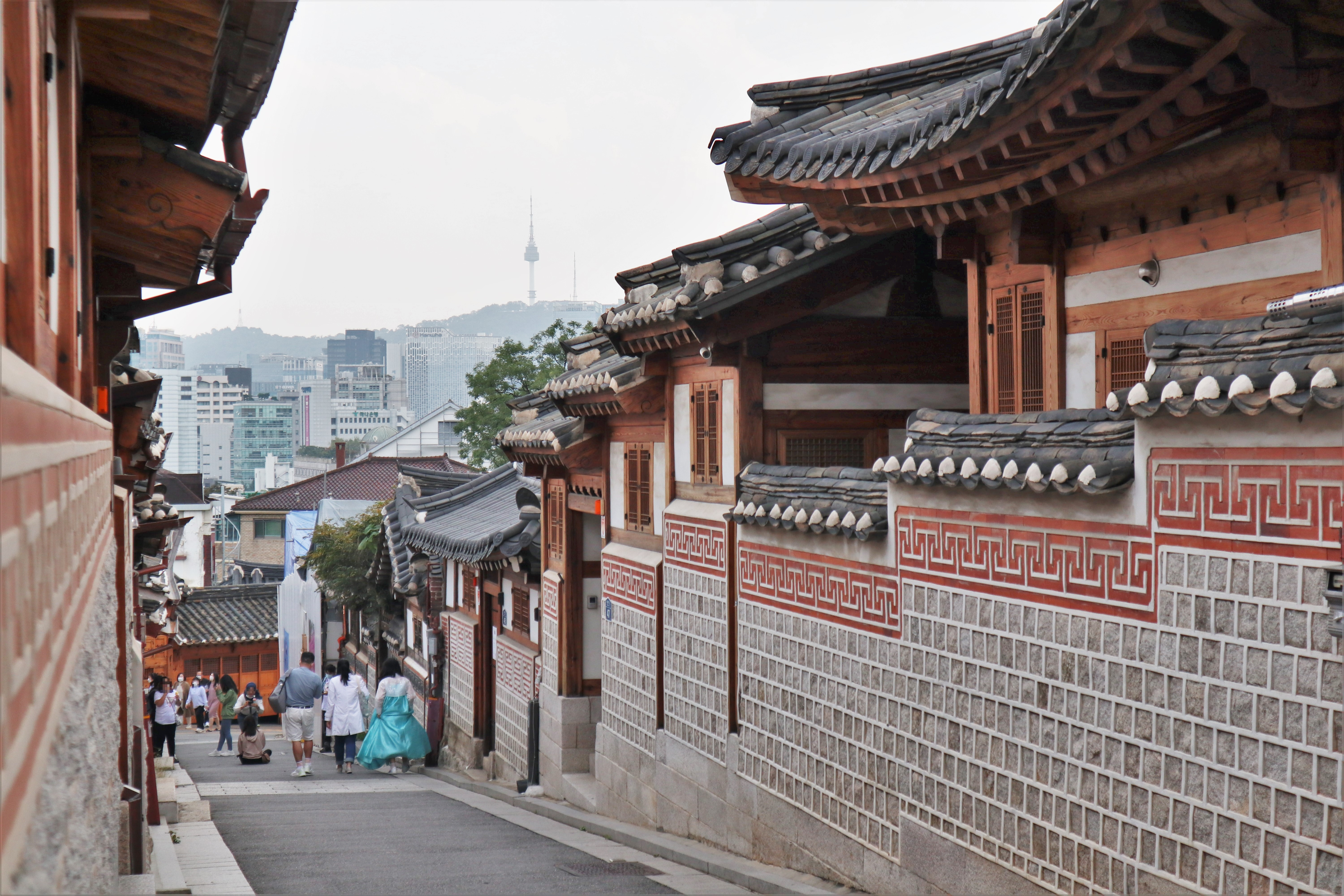
Bukchon Hanok Village in Seoul

Housing in South Korea includes detached houses, apartment (unit of apartment, row houses, and private houses), studio apartments, and dormitories in non-residential buildings such as shopping malls and factories. While the occupancy rate of apartment houses is steadily rising, the occupancy rate of detached houses is steadily falling.

As of 2023, the majority of housing in the country consisted of apartment buildings. South Korea's apartments generally consist of large complexes with amenities.

Traditional Korean Houses Hanok is wooden house consisting of ondol, maru, bueok, and madang. Depending on the roof material, there are several types of hanok, such as giwajip, chogajip, gulpijip, cheongseokjip, and neowajip. Most of them, Giwajip were owned by wealthy and high-ranking people.

== History ==
Chungjeong Apartment is among the oldest extant apartment buildings in South Korea, having been built during 1937. It was decided in 2022 that the building would be demolished.

In 1958, the construction of multi-unit buildings began in South Korea.

By 2005, more than half of Korean families lived in apartments.

South Korea's housing market grew as central bank interest rates were cut at the beginning of the coronavirus pandemic. During this period, many prospective homeowners sought loans at lower interest rates to buy homes. Since then, rising central bank interest rates have led to a noticeable downturn in the housing market. Yoon Suk Yeol's new government entered 2022 and achieved some stability in housing prices in the first month of the following year, but the problem has intensified due to its economic feasibility and the occurrence of a jeonse frauds case.

== Interior ==
=== Ondol ===
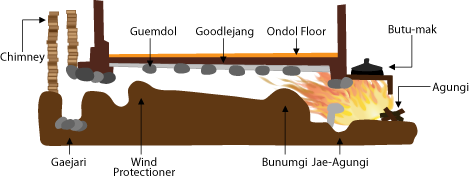
An illustration of the ondol system

The ondol is a traditional Korean floor heating system that has been around for thousands of years. Korea's complex system of ondol is unique and well-preserved. Most modern buildings and houses in South Korea still use heating methods similar to ondol. Today, hot water pipes are installed underneath the floors.

== Home ownership rate ==
Among South Korean household heads in their 70s, about 70 percent owned a home in 2021, followed by those in their 60s with about 68 percent. The overall homeownership rate in 2021 was 56.2 percent.

== See also ==
- Jeonse
- Hanok
