= Hanok =

Traditional Korean house

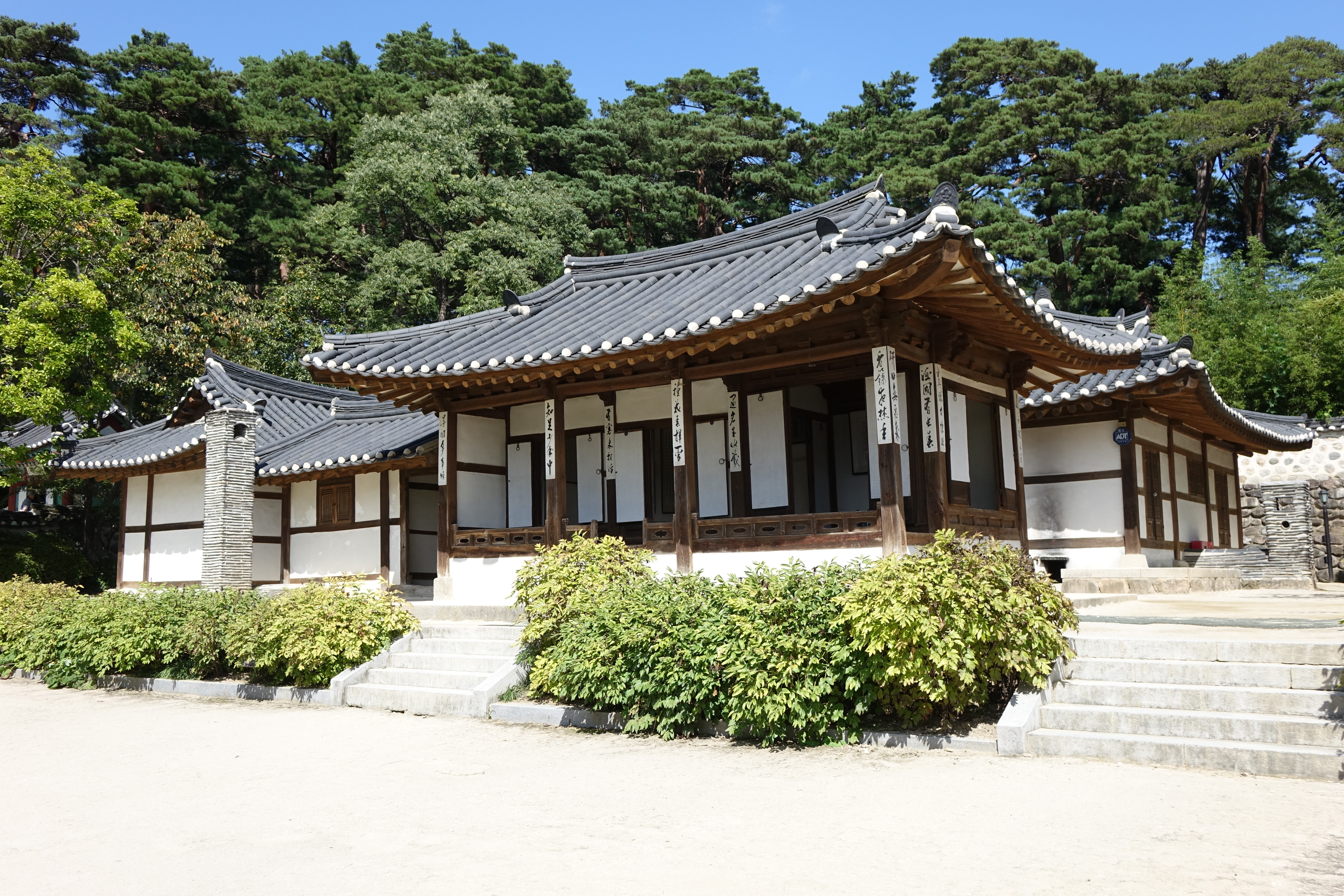
- Ojukheon in Gangneung

Korean name
- Hangul: 한옥
- Hanja: 韓屋
- RR: hanok
- MR: hanok

North Korean name
- Hangul: 조선집
- Hanja: 朝鮮집
- RR: Joseonjip
- MR: Chosŏnjip

A hanok (Korean: 한옥; name in South Korea) or chosŏnjip (조선집; name in North Korea and for Koreans in Yanbian, China) is a traditional Korean house. Hanok have their origins in pit houses from the early Neolithic period around 6,000 BCE, and the traditional form of Hanok was completed in the late Joseon period.

Korean architecture considers the positioning of the house in relation to its surroundings, with thought given to the land and seasons. The interior of the house is also planned accordingly. This principle is called baesanimsu (배산임수; 背山臨水), meaning that the ideal house is built with a mountain in the back and a river in the front. Hanok shapes differ by region. In the cold northern regions of Korea, hanok are built in a square with a courtyard in the middle in order to retain heat better. In the south, hanok are more open and L-shaped.

== History ==
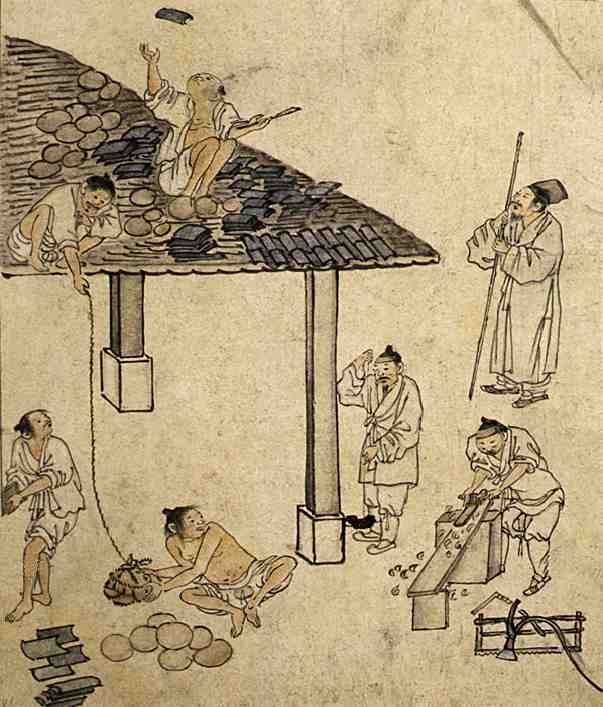
Giwa (기와) drawn by Danwon

A hanok is a Korean house which was developed in the Korean Peninsula and Manchuria.

=== Early history ===
Paleolithic people in the Korean peninsula may have occupied caves or made temporary houses. In the Neolithic era, the temporary house developed into a dugout hut. They dug into the ground with a small shovel and built a small house that used rafters and columns. Wood was used for the rafters and columns, and straw was used for roof. In the Bronze Age, there were several columns in the house, so the area of the house was extended relative to early houses. Iron Age hanok had Ondol, and also used giwa (기와), a kind of roofing tile which was made with fired clay. By using giwa roof tiles, hanok developed a specific shape.

South Korea

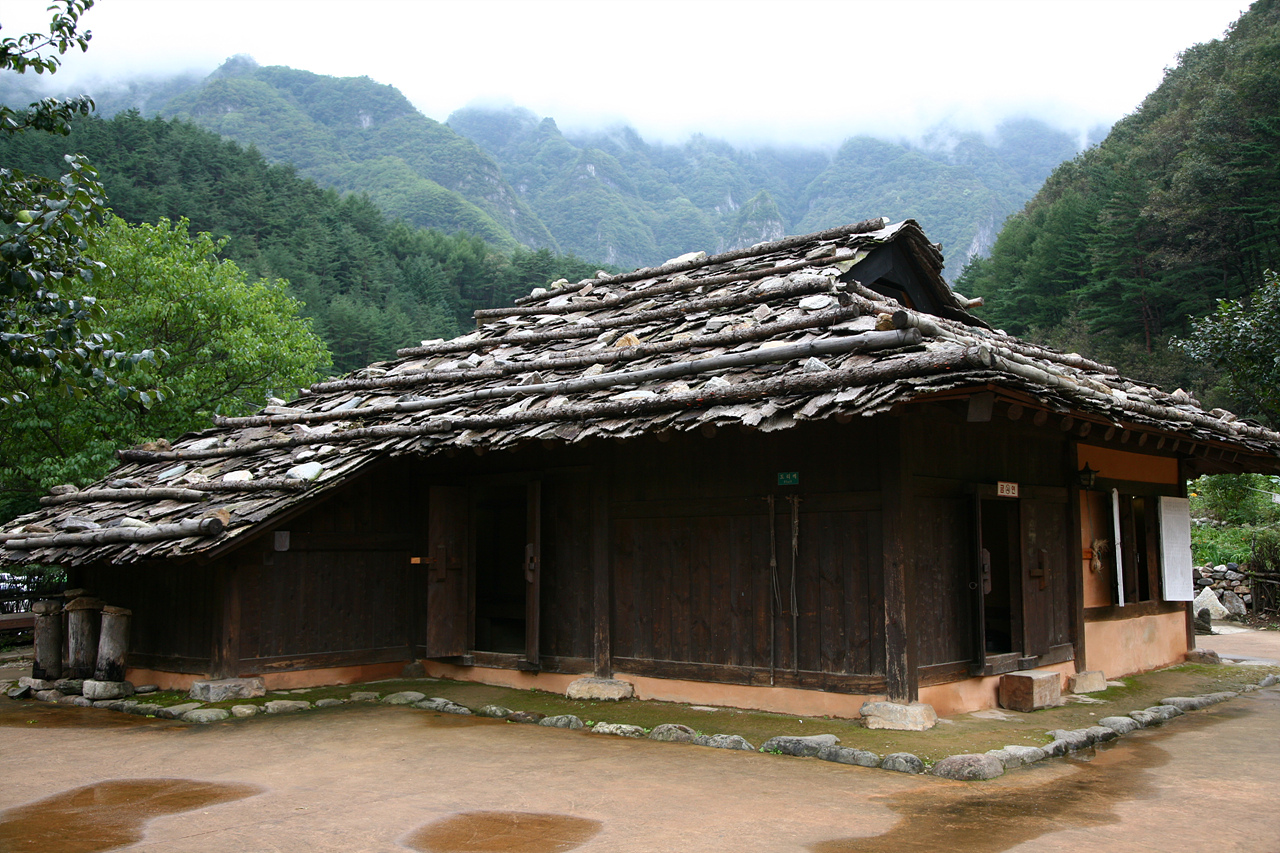
Korean traditional Bark shingled house, Neowajip or Gulpijip (굴피집) in Gangwon Province

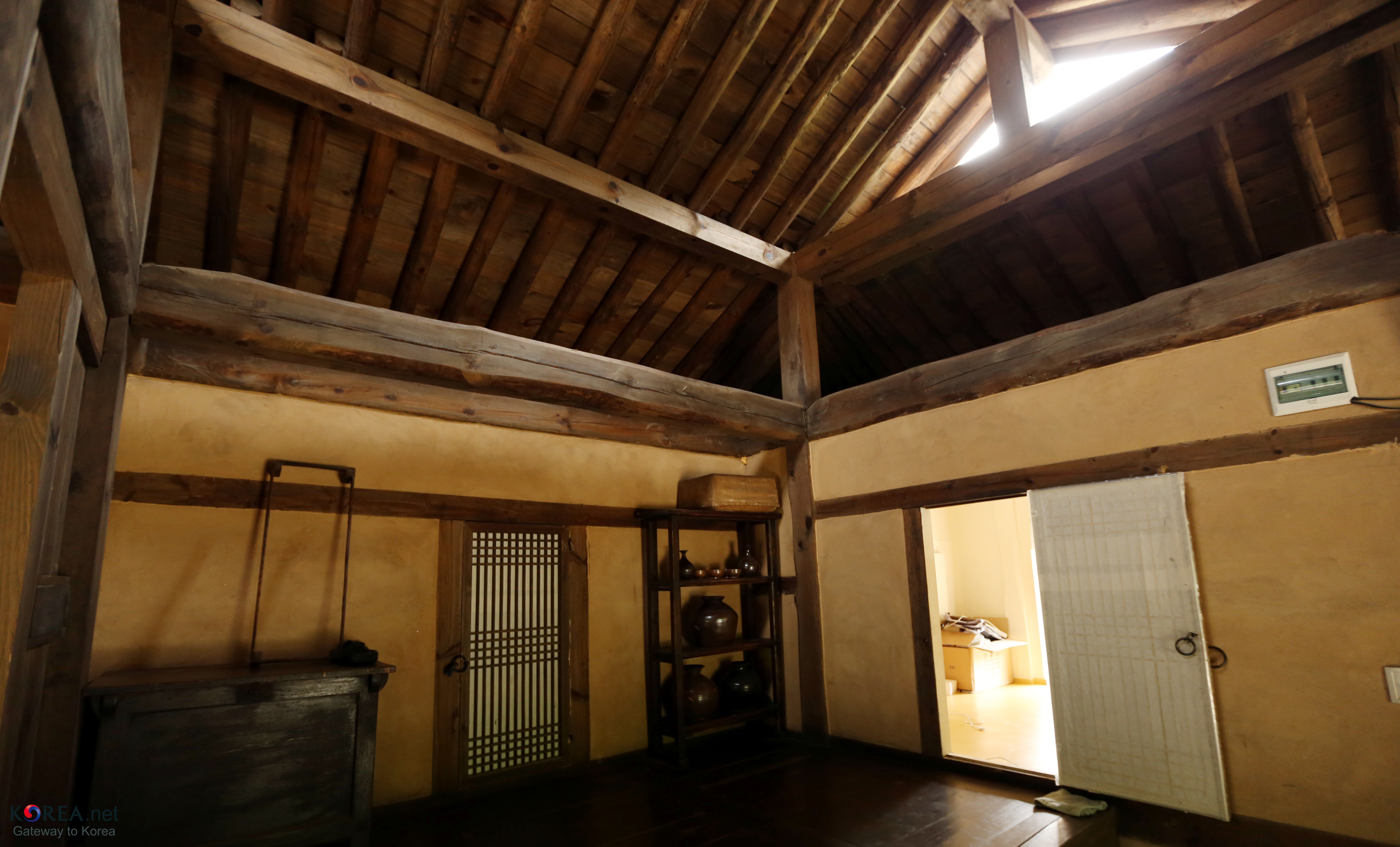
Interior of a traditional house at Jeongseon County, Gangwon Province

After the devastation of the Korean War there was a need for cheap, suitable housing for people displaced by the war. During the period immediately after the war, several hanok of historical value were demolished. In the larger cities of South Korea, only small clusters of hanok remain. However the value of hanok has been discussed in the early twentieth century, with many comparing them favourably to the more common but less eco-friendly apartments found across South Korea. Today, some train stations are influenced by traditional hanok design (Jeonju Station, for example).

=== North Korea ===
In Kaesong, the traditional hanok originally there remain and play a role as a tourist attraction. Giwajip (tile-roofed houses) surround the hanok.

=== China ===
Hanok can also be found in northeast China, and Koreans have been living for over 100 years in hanok built for themselves. Since 2010, people have been working on a project focused on making a hanok village in Heilongjiang, China.

In Lu Xun Park, Shanghai, Yun Bong-gil Memorial Hall is built in Hanok style to dedicate to Korean independence activist Yun Bong-gil.

== Origin ==
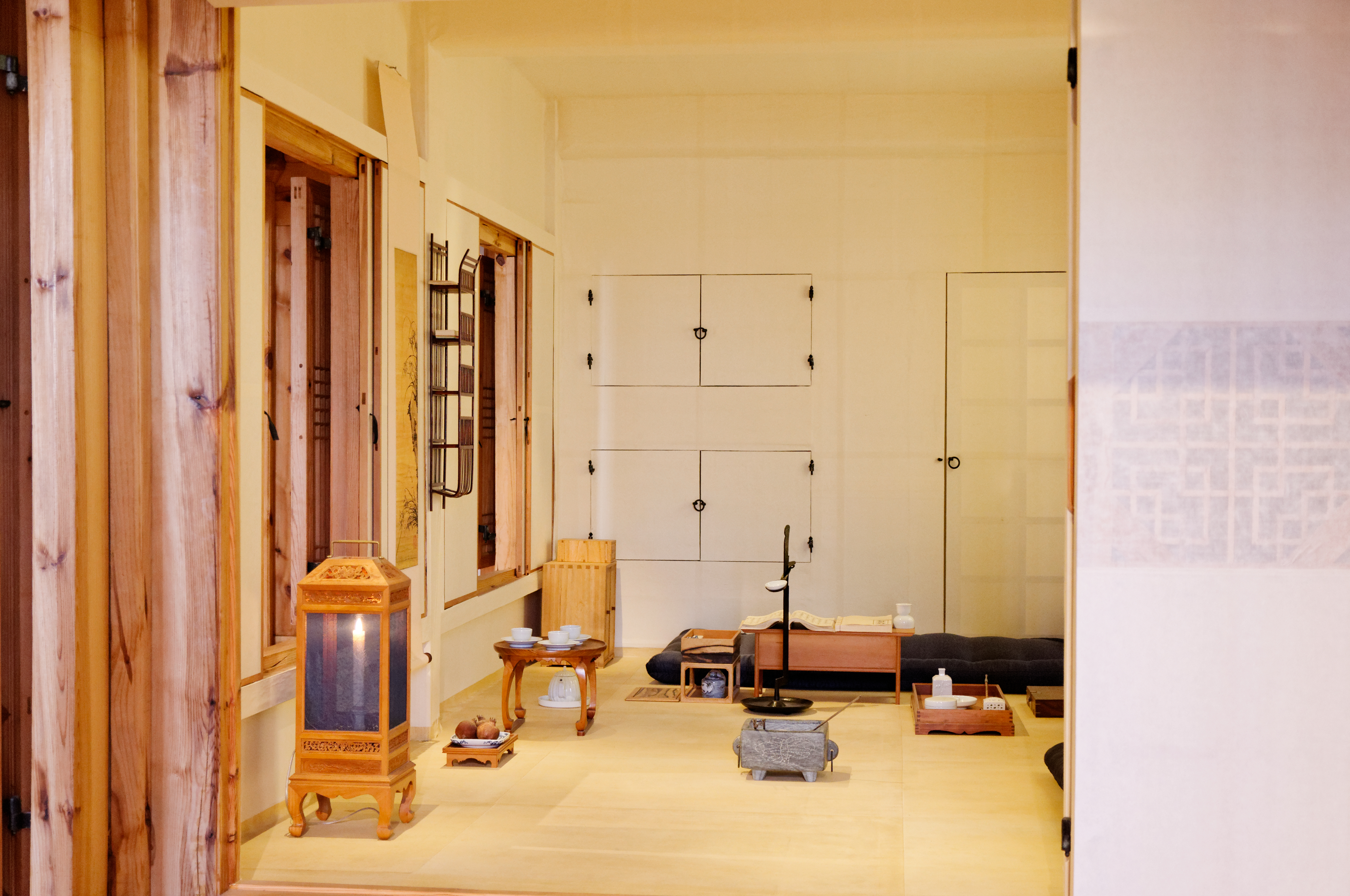
Sarangbang

The term 'hanok' appeared for the first time in a paper about houses on April 23, 1907. In that paper, hanok was used in reference to the specific area along Jeong-dong road from Donuimun to Baejae school. At that time, instead of using hanok, terms like jooga (meaning living houses) and jaetaek (meaning a variety of houses) were more widely used. The word hanok was only used in special circumstances when the latest house was built somewhere.

During the era of Korea under Japanese rule, the ruler used terms such as "jooga" or "Joseon house" when they were talking about house improvement. There is a record of hanok; however, the specific term "hanok" hasn't been used prevalently.

The specific word "hanok" appeared in the Samsung Korean dictionary in 1975, where it was defined as an antonym of "western house" and as a term meaning Joseon house (Korean-style house). After the 1970s, with urban development, many apartments and terraced houses were built in South Korea, and many hanok were demolished everywhere. From that time on, a hanok was only called a "Korean traditional house".

In a broad sense, "hanok" refers to a house with thatching or to a Neowa-jib (a shingle-roofed house) or a Giwa-jib (tile-roofed house), although the general meaning of hanok refers to only a Giwa-jib in Korea.

== Characteristics ==
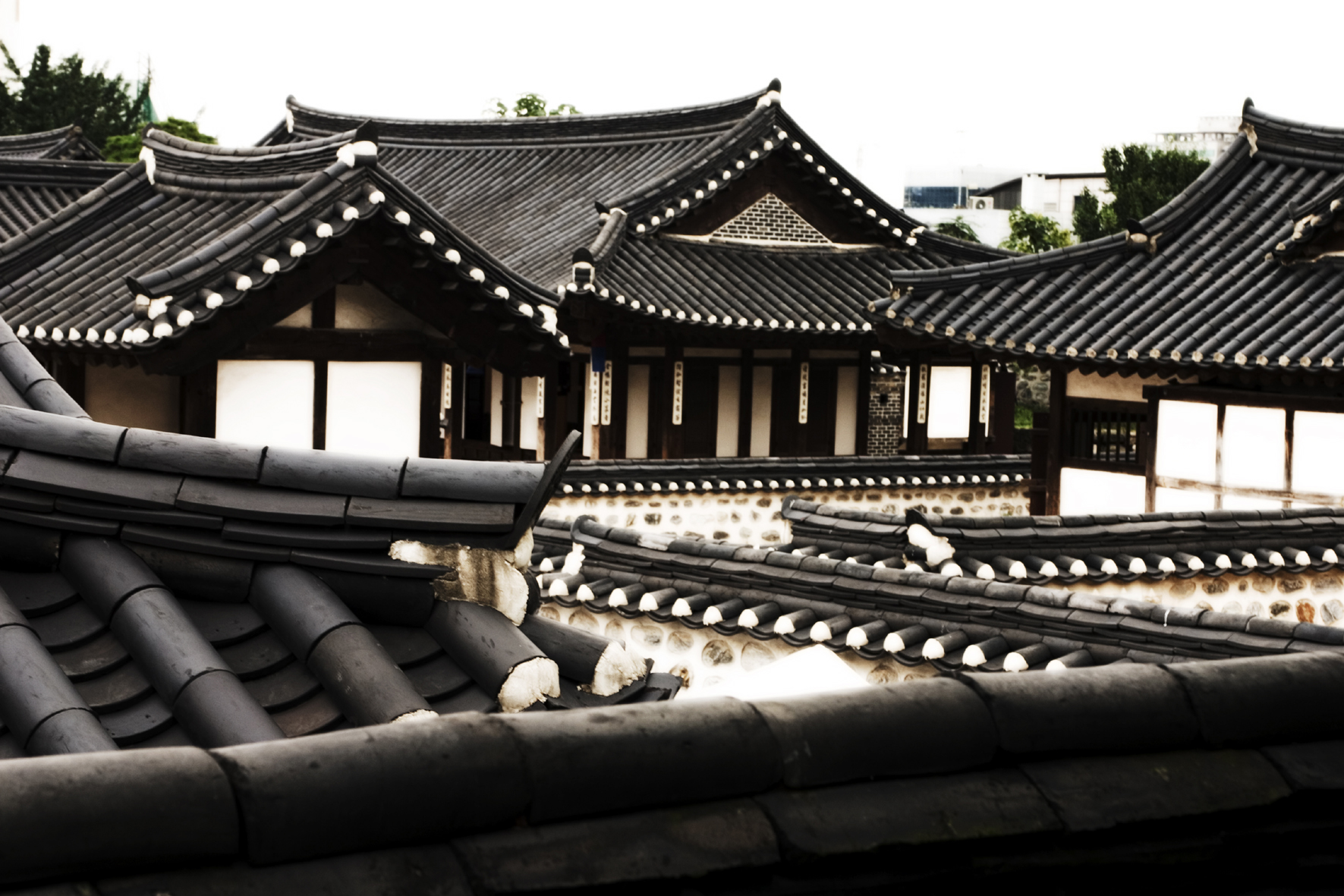
Hanok in Seoul

The environment-friendly aspects of traditional Korean houses range from the structure's inner layout to the building materials which were used. Another unique feature of traditional houses is their special design for cooling the interior in summer and heating the interior in winter.

Since Korea has hot summers and cold winters, the Ondol (Gudeul), a floor-based heating system, and the Daecheong, a cool wooden-floor style hall, were devised long ago to help Koreans survive the frigid winters and to block sunlight during summer. These early types of heating and air-conditioning were so effective that they are still in use in many homes today. The posts, or daedulbo, are not inserted into the ground, but are fitted into the cornerstones to keep hanok safe from earthquakes.

== Materials ==
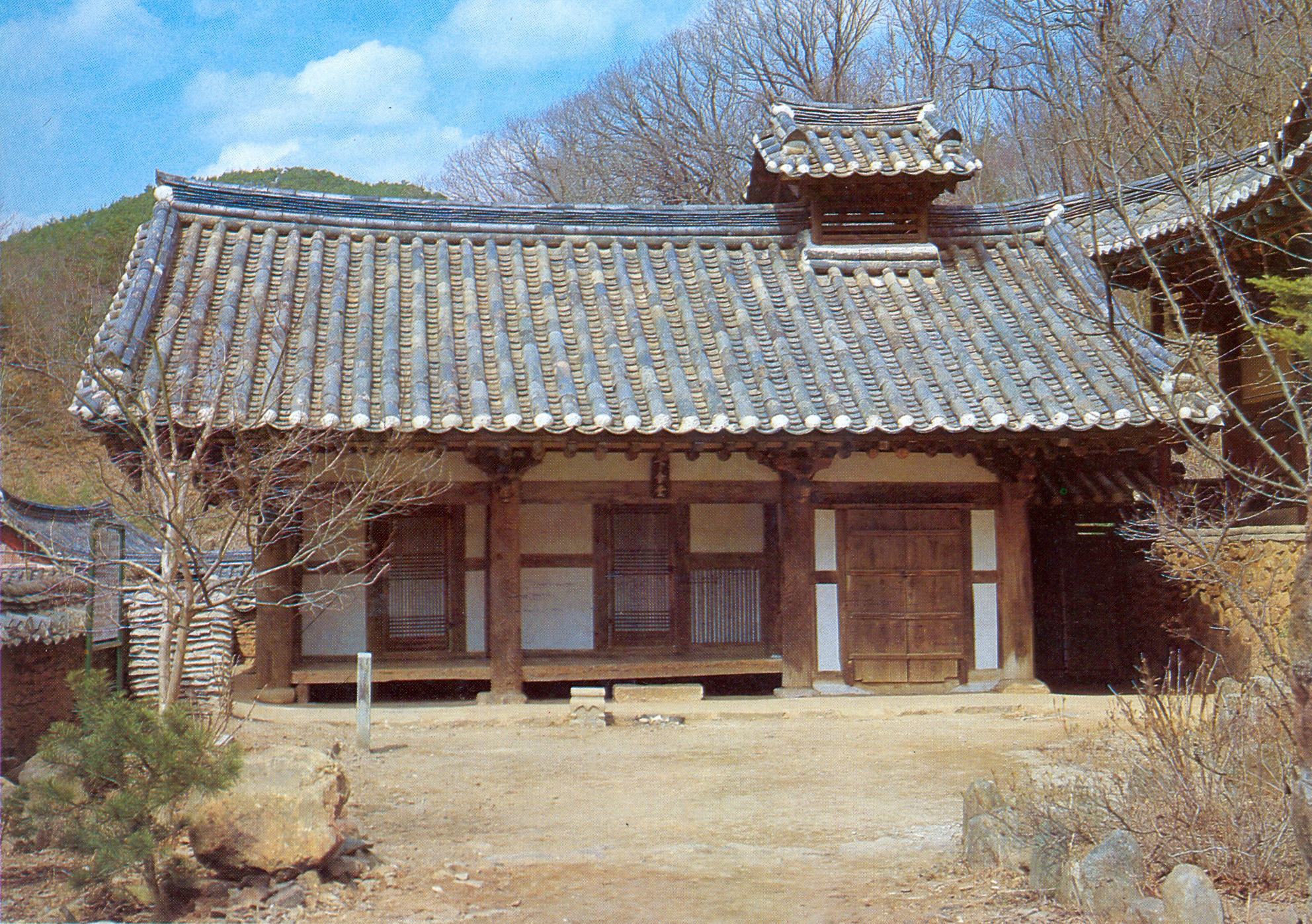
Hasadang Hall (built 1461) located in Suncheon, South Jeolla Province

The raw materials used in hanok, such as soil, timber, and rock, are all natural and recyclable and do not cause pollution. Hanok have their own tiled roofs (기와, giwa), wooden beams and stone-block construction. Cheoma is the edge of curved roofs of the hanok. The lengths of the Cheoma can be adjusted to control the amount of sunlight that enters the house. A form of traditional Korean paper (hanji), lubricated with bean oil to make it waterproof and polished, is used to make breathable windows and doors.

== Variations ==
=== By region ===
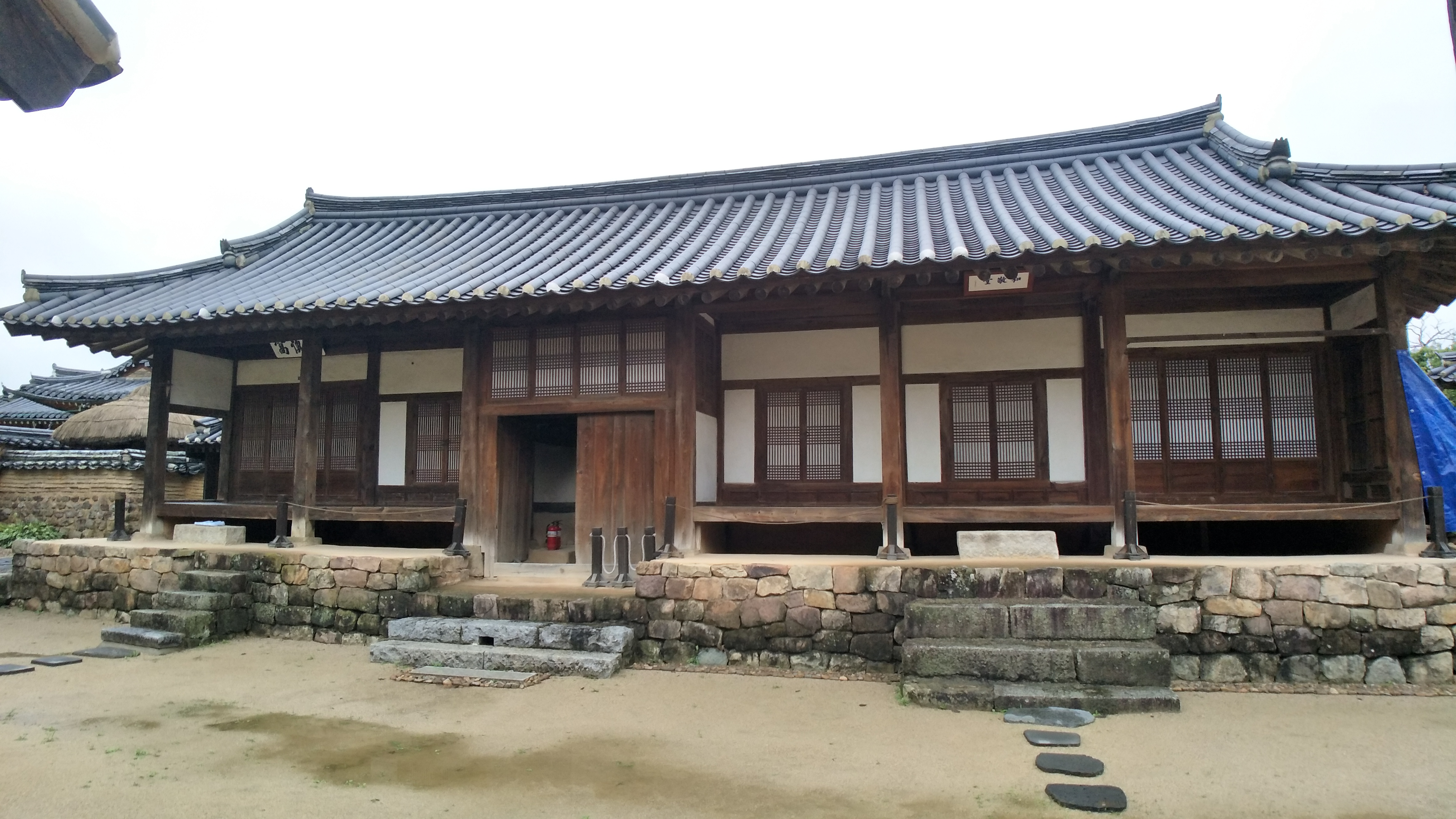
Bukchondaek, located in Andong, North Gyeongsang Province is a former upper class residence, originally built by a civil official in 1797.

The shapes of hanok differ regionally. Due to the warmer weather in the southern region, Koreans built hanok with the rooms aligned in a straight line. In order to allow good wind circulation, they have open, wooden floor living areas and many windows. The most common shape for hanok in the central region is an L-shaped layout, an architectural mixture of the shapes in the northern and the southern regions. Hanok in the cold northern region have square layouts that block the wind flow. They do not have an open, wooden floor area, and the rooms are all joined together. They commonly have Jeongjugan, a space between the kitchen and other rooms, which is warmed by an Ondol.

=== By social class ===
The structure of hanok is also classified according to social class. Typically the houses of yangban (upper class), jungin (middle class) and urban commoners, with giwa (tiled roof), emphasized not only the function of the house, but also its aesthetics. The houses of provincial commoners (as well as some impoverished yangban), with choga (a roof plaited by rice straw), were built in a more strictly functional manner.

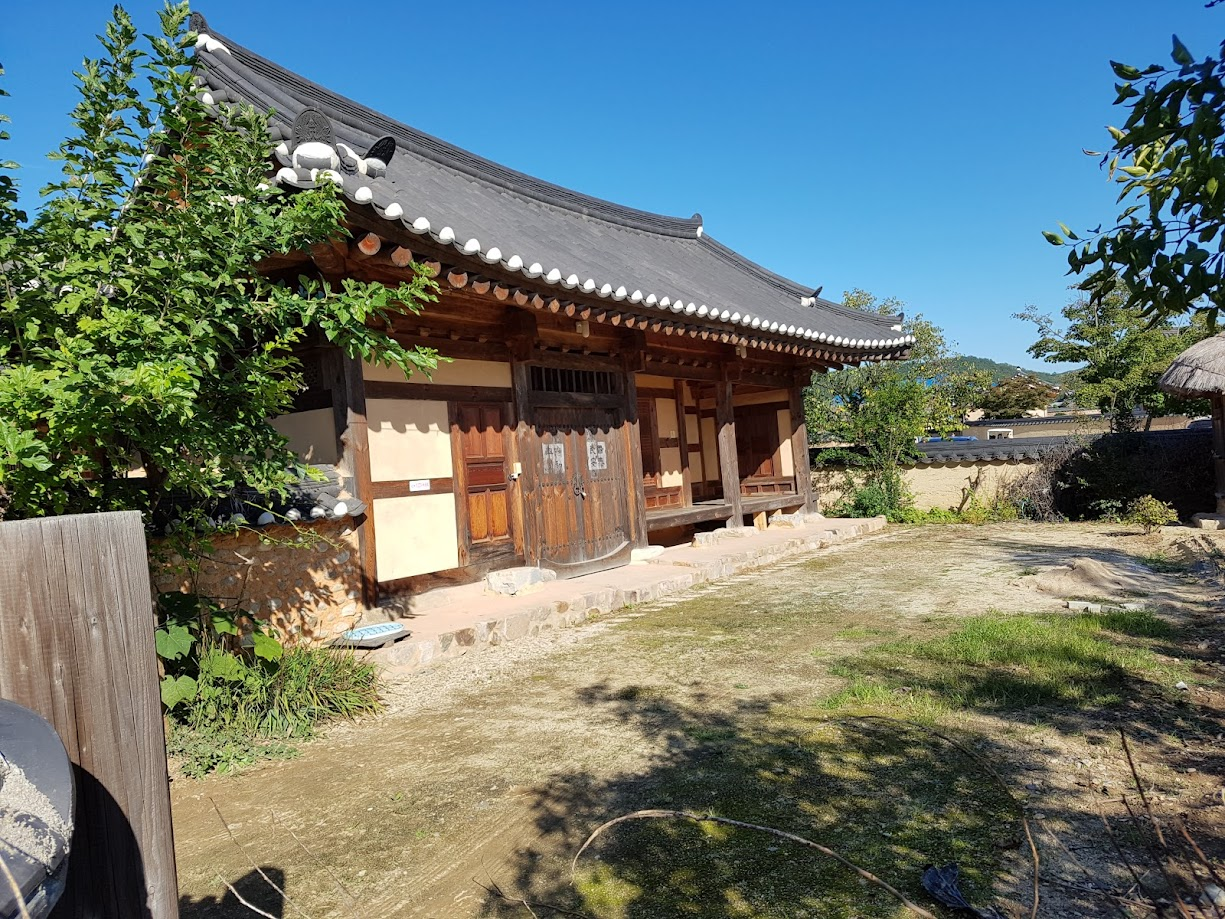
View of Hanok House in Hahoe Folk Village, South Korea

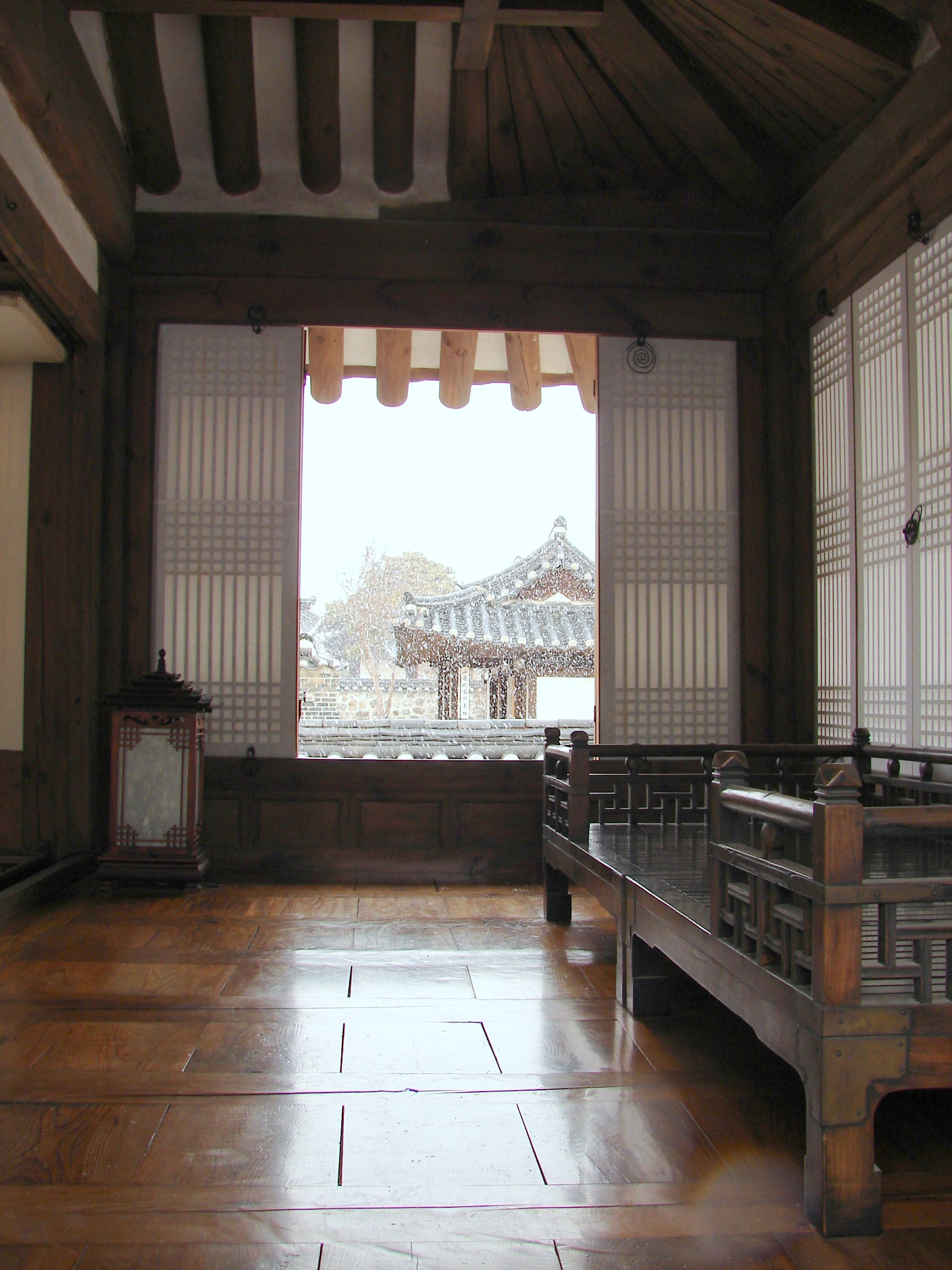
A Numaru is a traditional Korean balcony-like raised veranda. It is often distinguished from a larger living room by a plinth, a partial enclosure, and low-to-the-floor furniture.

== Preservation ==
Many hanok have been preserved, such as:

- Bukchon Hanok Village, a residential quarter in central Seoul
- Namsangol Hanok Village in Pil-dong, Jung District, Seoul
- Hahoe Folk Village, a traditional village from the Joseon period located in Andong, South Korea.
- Yangdong Folk Village, a traditional village from the Joseon period in Gyeongju, South Korea, along the Hyeongsan River.
- Korean Folk Village, a tourist attraction in the city of Yongin, Gyeonggi Province
- Jeonju Hanok Village, located in Jeonju, North Jeolla Province is one of the largest hanok districts in Korea with over 800 hanok houses.
- Gahoe-dong and Gye-dong in Jongno District, Seoul, are home to many hanok, many of which have been remodeled into cafés, restaurants, or teahouses.

== See also ==
- Choga (architecture)
- Korean architecture
- Housing in South Korea
