= Namsangol Hanok Village =

Recreated village in Seoul, South Korea

Coordinates: 37°33′33″N 126°59′38″E

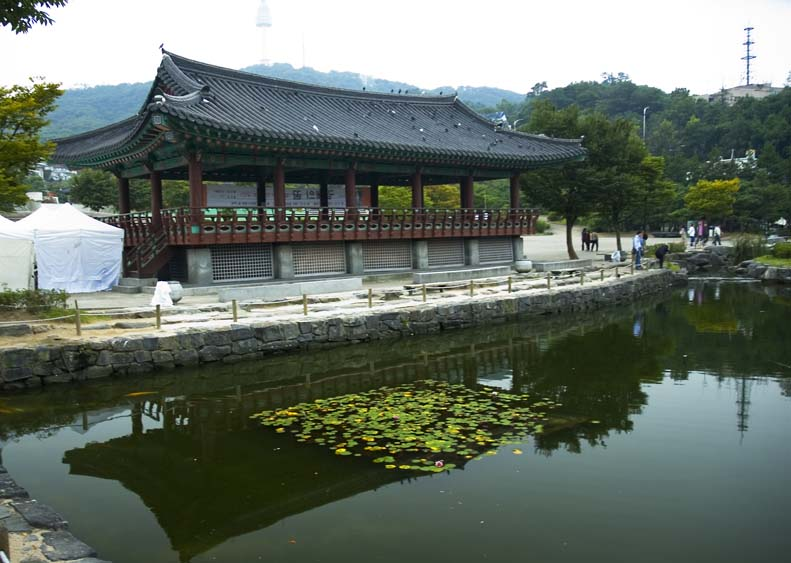

Korean name
- Hangul: 남산골한옥마을
- Hanja: 南山골韓屋마을
- RR: Namsangol hanok maeul
- MR: Namsankol hanok maŭl

Namsangol Hanok Village (Korean: 남산골한옥마을) is a recreated village of historical Korean buildings in Pil-dong, Jung District, Seoul, South Korea. The village contains several Korean traditional houses called hanok.

The Namsangol Hanok Village offers one the opportunity to experience a wide cross-section of Joseon-era citizenry and activities, from royalty to commoners. A great effort has been made to accurately furnish each dwelling with appropriate era and social status appointments.

Admission is free, although it is closed on Tuesdays. It is close to Chungmuro Station at the intersection of Seoul Metropolitan Subway Line 3 and Line 4.

== History ==
The location of the village was originally the site of a well known Joseon-era summer resort called Jeonghakdong. Jeonghakdong means "The land of the fairies for the blue crane where the Jeonugak Pavilion stands along the stream in the valley". The area boasted such superb scenery that it was called the land of the fairies and was considered one of the five most beautiful parts of Seoul.

A traditional Korean style garden, complete with a flowing stream and pavilion was constructed on the site in order to revive the classical feel of the Joseon-era. Five traditional houses, including some of the residences of high government officials - some of the largest mansions in Seoul at the time, along with commoners houses were moved to the 7,934 sq Meters/9,489 sq Yards grounds containing the restored village.

== Tourism ==
In 2011 in a survey conducted, by Seoul Development Institute, which included 800 residents and 103 urban planners and architects. It listed 52.4 percent of experts, voted that the palace as the most scenic location in Seoul, following Namsan, Han River and Gyeongbokgung in the top spots.

== Gallery ==
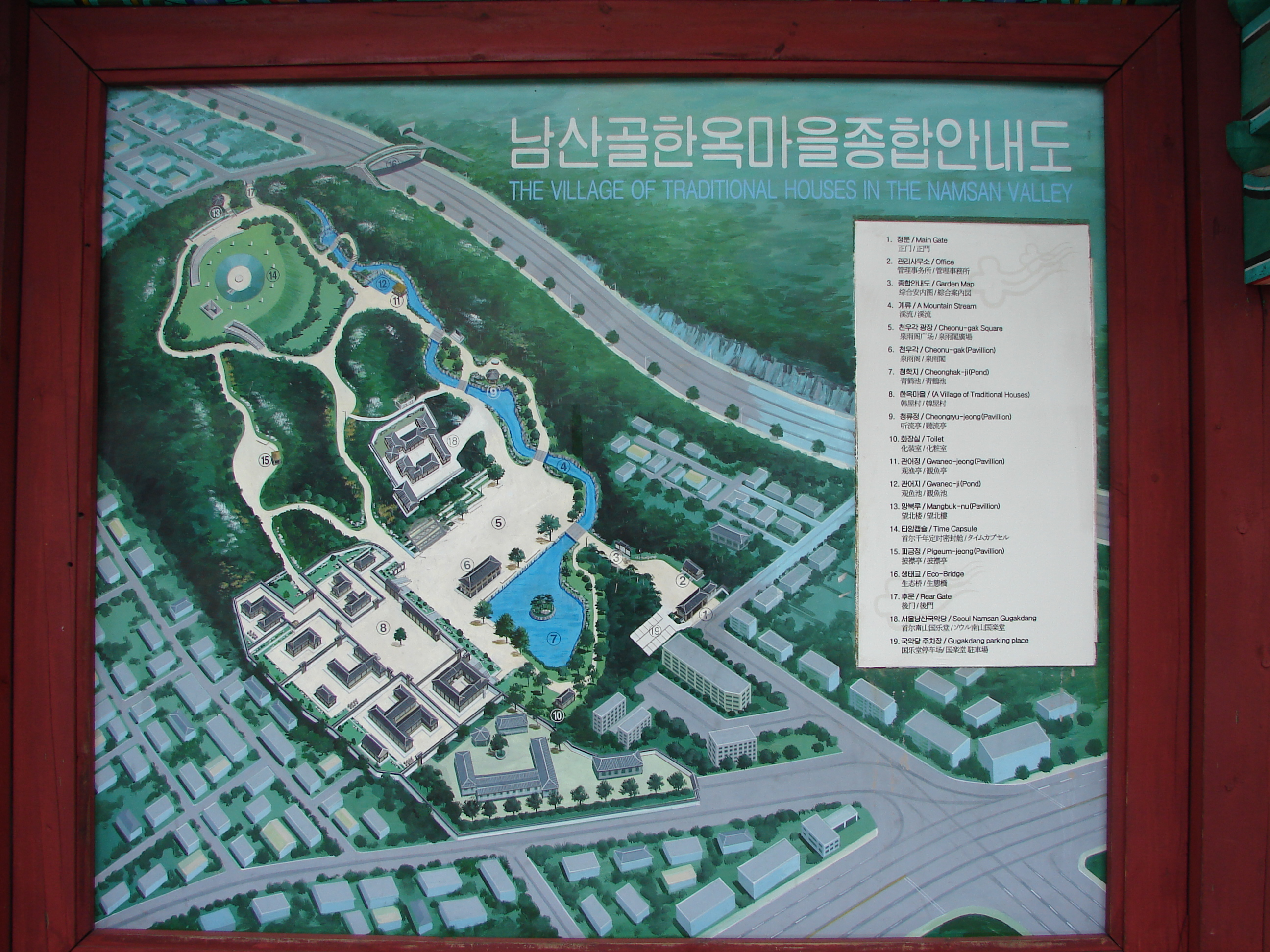
Guide map found near the main gate of the village

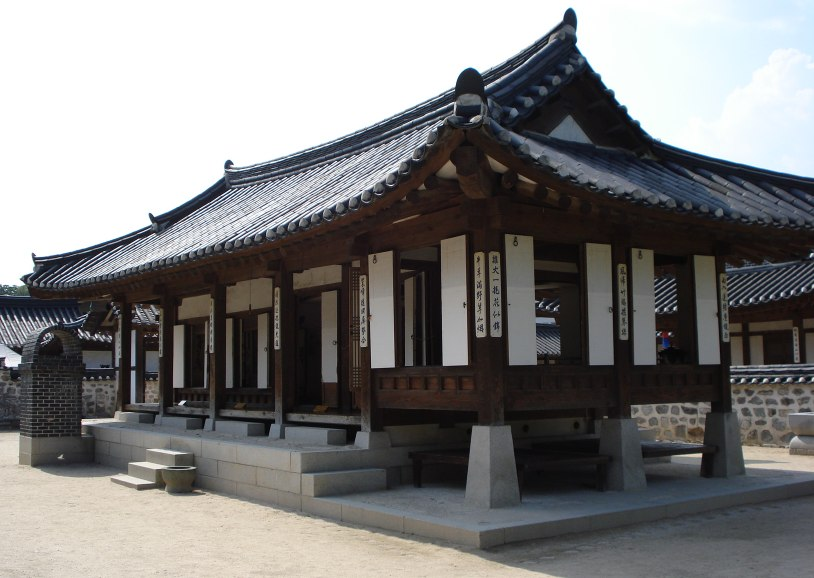
Hanok, a Korean traditional house

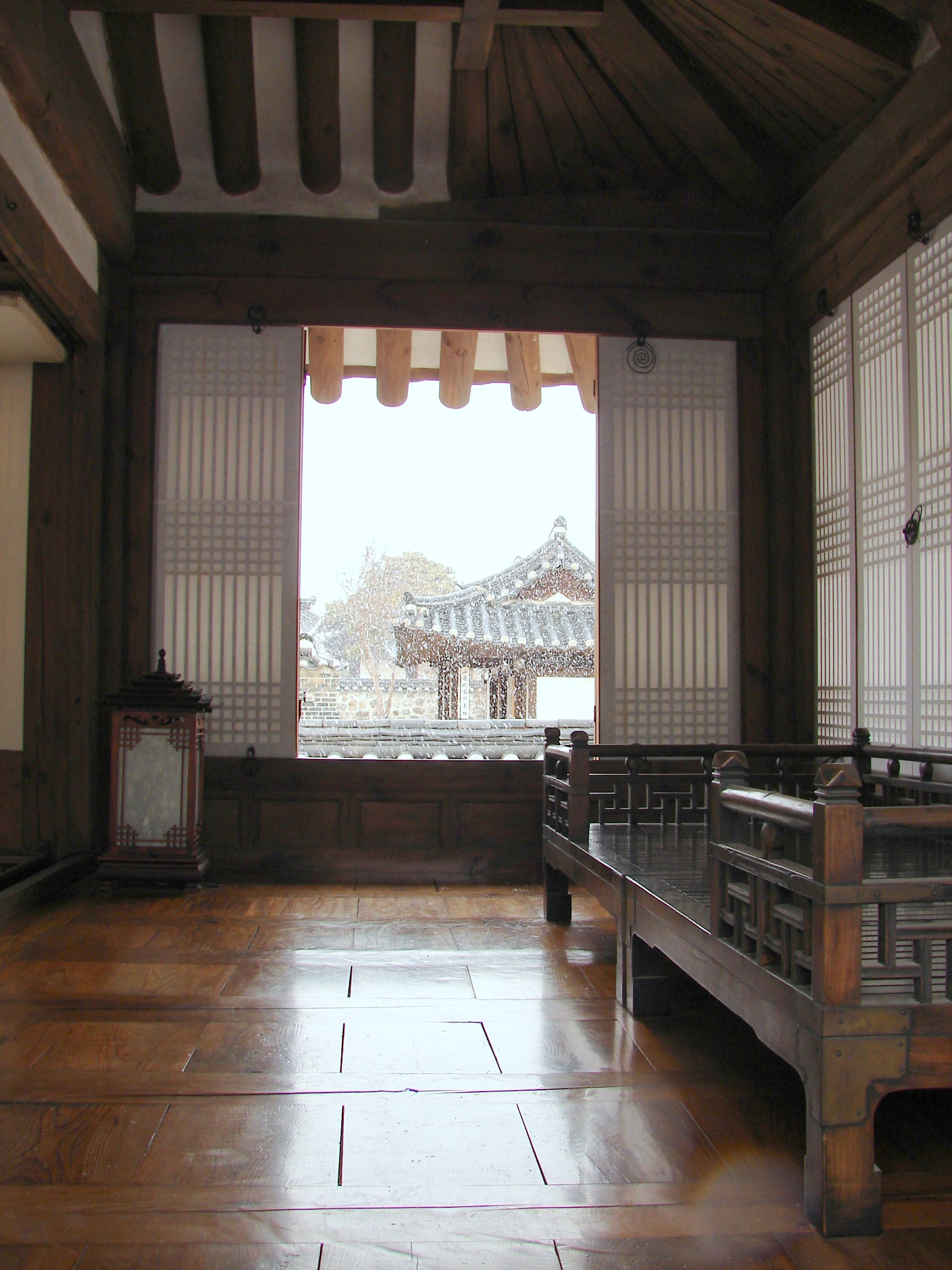
View inside a Hanok at the village

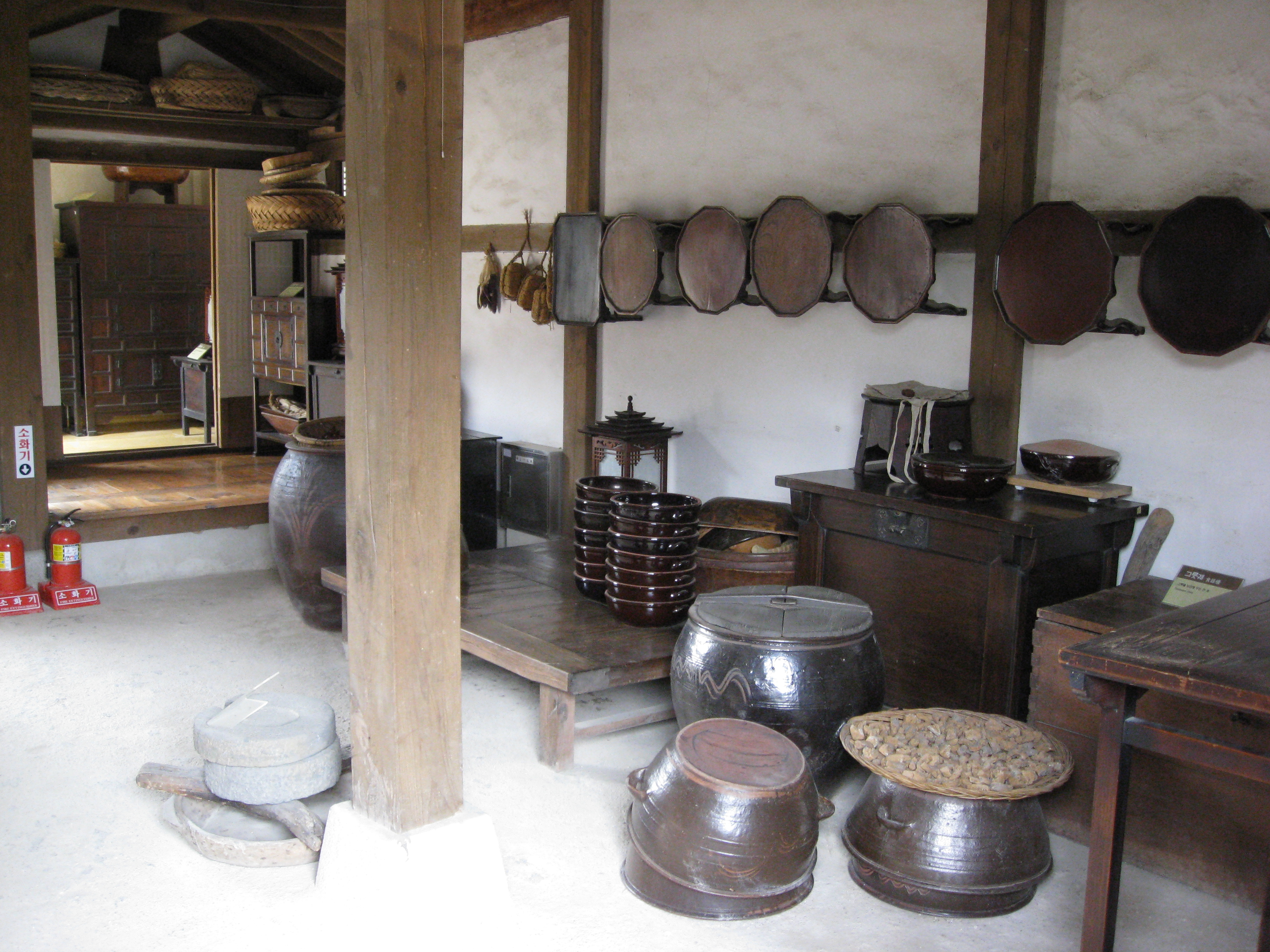
Traditional kitchen

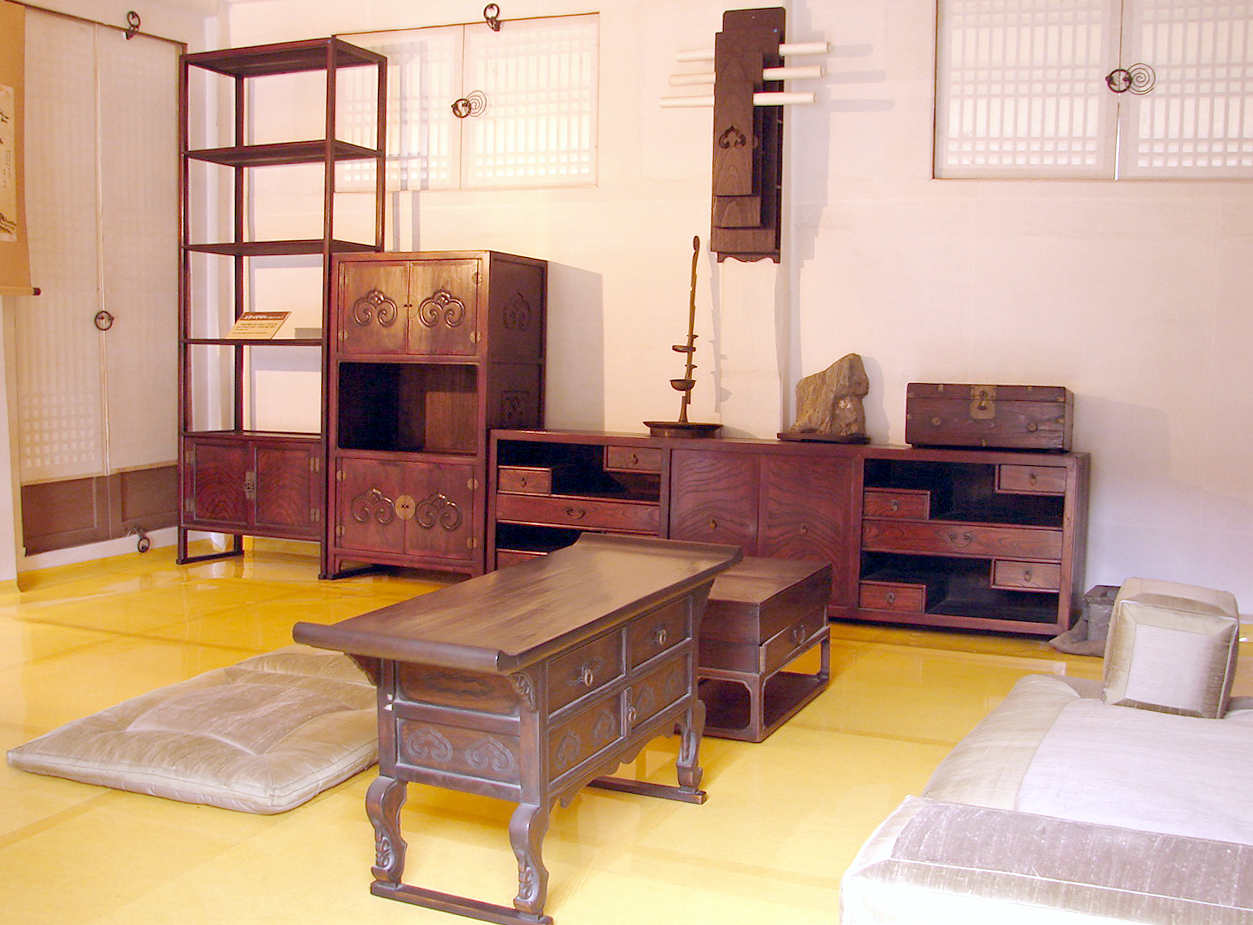
Interior of a home in the Namsangol Hanok Village

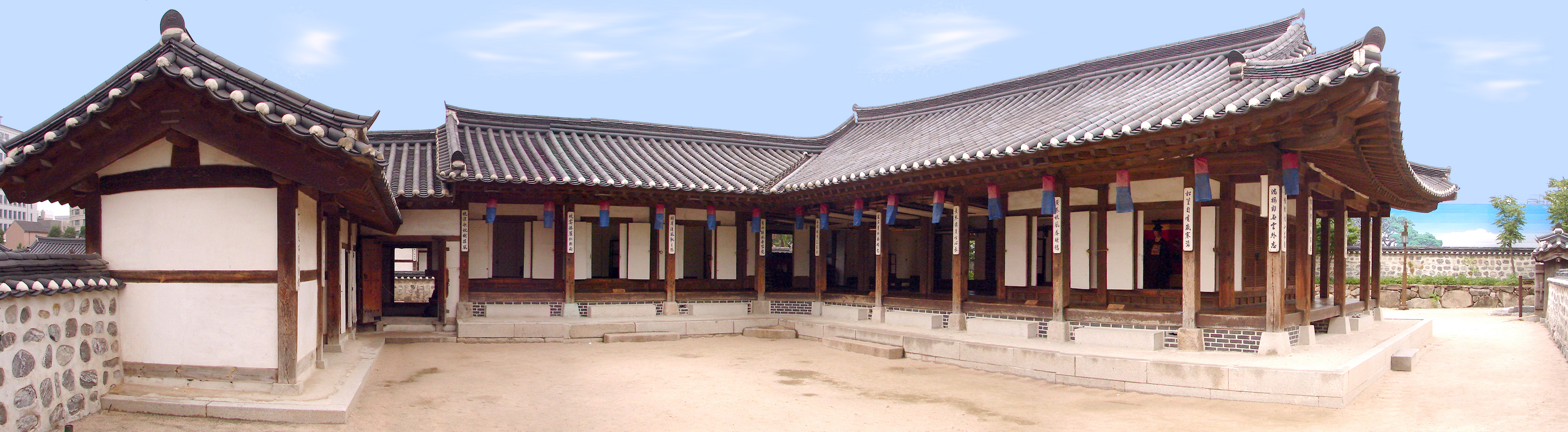
A traditional home in the Namsangol Hanok Village

== See also ==
- Bukchon Hanok Village
- Korean Folk Village
- Hahoe Folk Village
- Yangdong Village of Gyeongju
