= Gahoe Museum =

History museum in Seoul, South Korea

Coordinates: 37.5822°N 126.9856°E

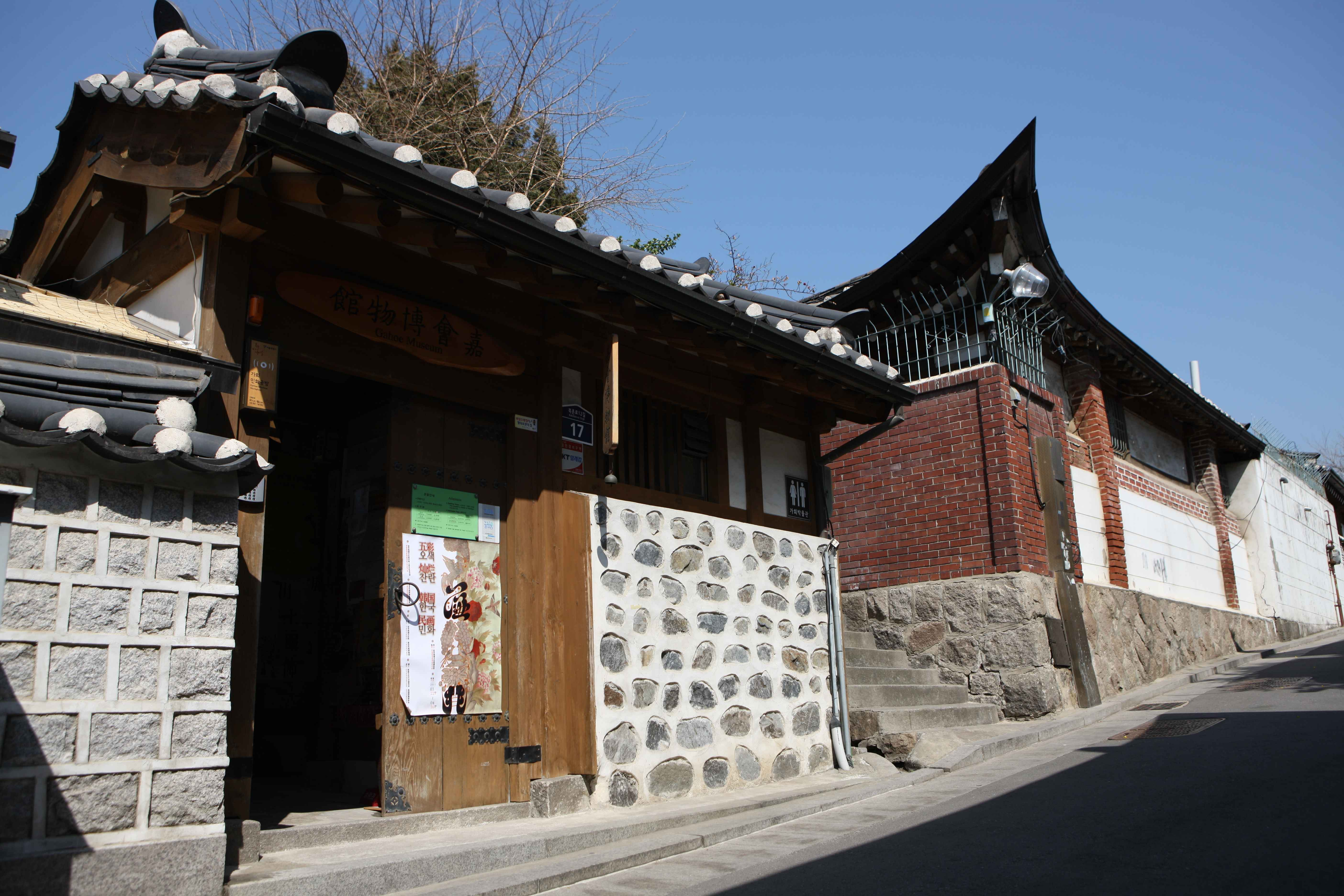
- Established: 2002
- Location: Gahoe-dong, Jongno-gu, Seoul, South Korea
- Collection size: 1,500 relics
- Website: gahoemuseum.org

Korean name
- Hangul: 가회박물관
- Hanja: 嘉會博物館
- RR: Gahoe bangmulgwan
- MR: Kahoe pangmulgwan

Gahoe Museum (Korean: 가회박물관) is a private museum in Gahoe-dong, Jongno District, Seoul. Established in 2002, its collection includes over 1,500 items, including 750 amulets, 250 items of folk paintings, approximately 150 classical books, and 250 other odd items. The museum is located on a street of traditional Hanok houses and gardens. The main exhibition hall retains traditional Joseon era architectural features.

In addition to permanent and special exhibitions, the museum also operates the Gahoe Folk Painting Workshop where visitors can learn folk painting.

== See also ==
- Bukchon Art Museum
- List of museums in Seoul
- List of museums in South Korea
