= Jae-dong =

- Interactive map of Jae-dong
- Country: South Korea

Area
  - Total: 0.05 km^{2} (0.019 sq mi)

Korean name
- Hangul: 재동
- Hanja: 齋洞
- RR: Jae-dong
- MR: Chae-dong

Jae-dong (Korean: 재동) is a dong (neighborhood) of Jongno District, Seoul, South Korea. It is a legal dong (법정동 法定洞) administered under its administrative dong (행정동 行政洞), Gahoe-dong.

== See also ==
- Administrative divisions of South Korea
