= Choga (architecture) =

Thatched-roof housing style in Korea

- Hangul: 초가
- Hanja: 草家
- RR: choga
- MR: ch'oga

Choga (Korean: 초가; Hanja: 草家; lit. 'grass house') is a term for traditional Korean houses (hanok) with thatched roofing. The main building materials used to build these houses are straw, wood and soil.

Thatched-roofing was especially popular among farmers and low-income classes in traditional Korean society. Certain plants, such as gourds and pumpkins, could be grown on top of choga roofs. One of the major disadvantages of the materials used, in particular rice straw, was that it could rot quickly when exposed to the elements.

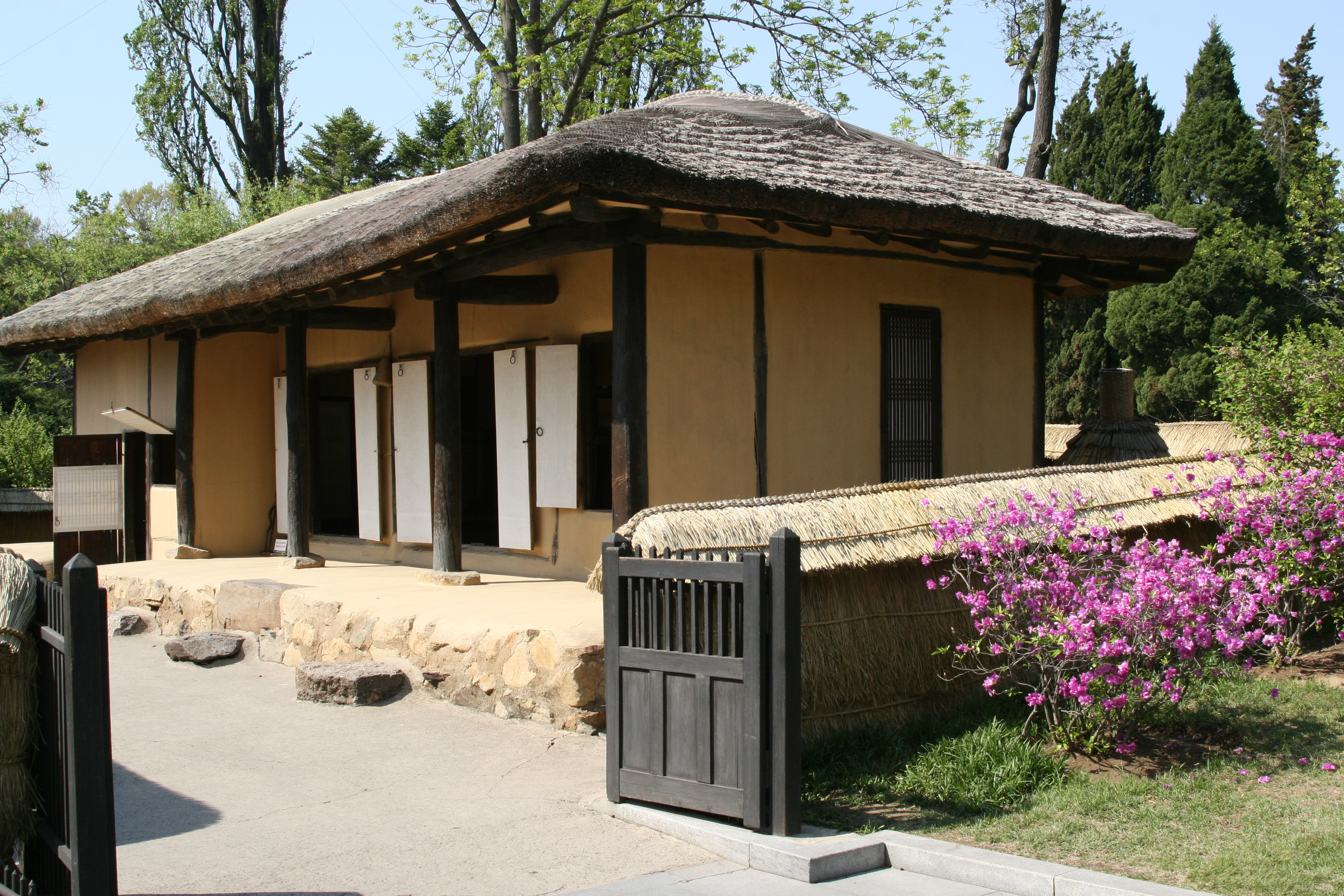
Kim Il Sung's Choga near Pyongyang

Choga is one of the two classifications of traditional Korean housing. Choga is named after and characterised by its straw thatched-roof; to be distinguished from giwa, its tiled-roof counterpart. Choga was the representative housing for the working class in Korea from prehistoric times until mid 20th century. Due to urbanisation and choga's nondurable nature, this type of dwelling has been almost entirely replaced in Korea.

== History ==
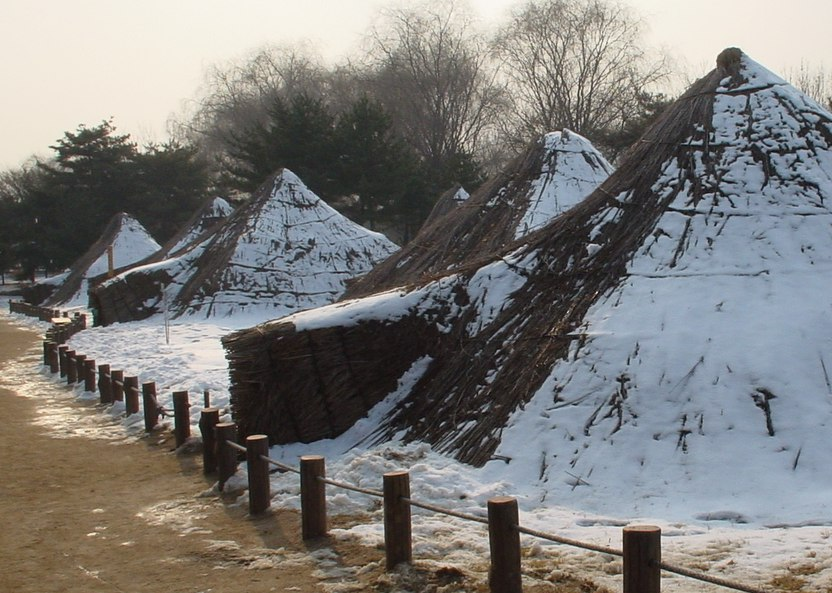
Neolithic huts in Korea

The origin of choga is not well known due to a lack of historical documentation, however it is believed that choga is an evolution of the Neolithic huts. The earlier mode of building which involved digging the ground and placing grass on top to cover gradually developed into earthen walls supporting roofs, then to wooden poles and beams. The earliest transcript of this type of dwelling was written during the Three Kingdoms period, where it was stated that Kim Suro (57 BCE-4CE), the first King of Silla had lived in a choga.

== Building techniques and materials ==
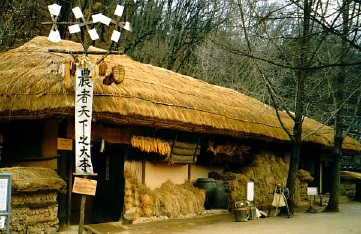
Choga in Korean Folk Village in South Korea

Earlier models of choga were most commonly built using the wattle and daub technique. Wooden sticks are daubed with a mixture of clayey soil mixed with chopped rice straw (4–5 cm long) in order to prevent cracking caused by high clay content. Rice straw is hollow inside, therefore the air trapped in it acts as a natural insulator which blocks out sunlight and prevents heat from escaping the house. The straw present in both the roof and the walls of choga acts as a building membrane which provides the house with good insulation.

Over time, rammed earth became another popular building technique as it has better thermal mass property and is more resistant against earthquake compared to wattle and daub. Rammed earth is a more labour intensive method and the process of ramming the earth requires multiple people to carry out, making it a community effort to construct housing. Throughout the period when choga was the most prevalent type of dwelling, when a new individual moved to a town or village, they were required to rent a room for up to three years. Only once they had earned the trust and recognition of other citizens were they to be lent a mould and manpower to help build their house.

The wooden formwork, which consists of columns, girders, beams, rafters, and many other smaller components, stands on a platform to support its roof. The shape of the formwork varied depending on the skill of the carpenter of each town or village.

The roof of the house is most commonly covered with rice straw due to its inexpensiveness and abundance. Alternatively, wheat straw or strong vegetable fibre such as grass can also be used. The use of rice straw dates back to the Three Kingdom period when they started cultivating rice. The roof holds low durability and can rot or deteriorate quickly when exposed to harsh forces of weather. Therefore roofs had to be replaced every one to three years depending on the regional climate, usually prior to the summer monsoon season when heavy rainfall is expected. The replacement process is also a community effort which would require help from men of the neighbourhood. Despite its poor longevity, the roof can be an adequate short-term protector of the house as it is not only slippery and non-absorbent of water, but also built to be much bigger than the structures underneath.

The outer wall which surrounds the residence is called todam, "to" means earth and "dam" means a low fence-like wall. In windy Jeju, this wall is called chukdam and is made of rocks stacked together without mortar so strong winds can pass through them as opposed to knocking them down.

== Characteristics ==
Choga characteristics are reflective of Korean lifestyle philosophies under the influence of Confucianism, particularly their close relationship with nature and simple and frugal lifestyle. Chogas are built in harmony with nature to minimise any disruptions to the surroundings, leaving the natural contours of the terrain intact. Confucianism also accentuates a simple and frugal lifestyle which can be shown through choga's simple and empty design. The house layout highlight a feeling of openness with an open garden in centre, and the layout is usually asymmetrical, emphasising a sense of naturalness.

The structures of traditional Korean housing are also predominantly influenced by social philosophy, rather than practical functionality. Under a rigid patriarchal society, households are segregated by gender and husband and wife were banned from sharing a bedroom. Dwellings are divided into two main quarters: Anchae (women's quarter) and Sarangchae (men's quarter). Women were prohibited from doing many things, including leaving the house freely, and therefore spent most of their lives within the Anchae devoted to housekeeping. Men studied, entertained and hosted guests in the Sarangchae. Each quarter is further subdivided into rooms such as female bedroom, male bedroom, male study room, or side rooms for children and the elderly. The female bedroom is the innermost part of the house and where valuables are kept. During earlier times, only the husband, children and close female relatives were to enter this room.

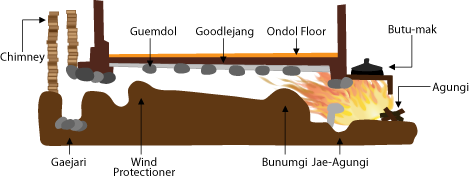
Ondol heating system

Residents of choga commonly used a heatable brick bed made of mud and stone as a heating method called Ondol, however some sources also claim that it is more common to rely solely on heat generated in the kitchen. The heating system includes a 20–30 cm high firebox and stove and flues built in underfloor to convey the heat to the chimney. Lee emphasises that the coexistence of Ondol floors (heated floors) and Maru floors (wooden floors) within same building is one of the most distinct features of traditional chogas. Ondol floors were made of stone covered with clay, then surfaced with a particular type of oiled paper. This heating system makes the floor comfortable to reside on during colder days and is well-fitted to the Korean lifestyle of sitting on the floor.

Different layouts of choga can be found across Korea, influenced by two variables: region and class. This can be attributed to how personal the house-plan of a choga is, with an absent of any standardised plan or any qualifications in order to build a choga house. The characteristics of choga can be adapted depending on regional variables such as climate and accessible materials as well as financial capabilities of each household.

While choga characteristics vary throughout Korea, choga in Jeju Island is the most notable variation as it contains significantly different characteristics from houses found in the mainland. Jeju's choga, which is called Chojip, was designed to withstand the constant extreme winds of the island and are built in shorter height. The dwellings also segregate different family generations as opposed to gender. Another example of differing characteristics is the variations of the layout: in Seoul the layout is mostly L-shaped, in the Central areas rooms were grouped into two rows separated by a corridor-like space, whereas in Western areas the rooms are laid in a straight line.

Each choga is formed with outer walls encapsulating various smaller buildings, with greater numbers of buildings signifying higher levels of income. For households with lower income, these buildings are reduced into rooms; for example an anchae (women's quarter) can be reduced to an anbang (women's room).

On the other hand, peasants could not afford the resources and time to construct a house, therefore had to borrow the wooden framework from their owners to build a their dwellings, birthing a smaller and simpler version of choga called a Todam house. This type of housing was exclusively built during nighttime with torches as peasants were not allowed to have free time during the day, earning the name "thief house". A todam house has a minimal structure, rectangular plan of todam walls with rafter covered by straws to form a roof.

== Choga through modernisation ==
The prevalence of chogas saw a rapid decline during the second half of the 20th century as Korea entered a time of rapid modernisation and industrialisation, with several sources pinpointing the 1960s as the start of the decline. Movements and developmental projects, along with the introduction of generalised building techniques and subsequent decrease in familiarity with choga construction were all variables which led to the demise of this traditional dwelling. It is suggested that the housing shortages and forest destructions post-WWII were underlying causes leading to this change. Urban planning, which consisted of changes to the street system and subdivision of housing lot, generated a need for space optimisation and housing standardisation. Choga, being spatially demanding and having personalised planning. went against both criteria. Chogas therefore were first replaced by mass-produced urban-type hanoks during the mid-20th century, then by Western-style housing. By the 1980s, Choga's thatched roofs were substantially replaced by cement and slate roofs across Korea. Earth was erased from the Korean architectural scene and was no longer seen as a viable building medium. Perception of earthen construction worsened, signifying poverty and a lack of civilisation.

Choga has not provoked much academic research both domestically and internationally, and is often neglected in dialogues about traditional Korean architecture in favour of Giwa which was the representative housing type of the noble, upperclass. Schools of civil engineering and architecture across Korea have excluded earthen construction from teaching curriculums and focus their research projects predominantly on concrete and steel, leading to a further lack of interest and documentation. However, there has been recent progresses in research on choga building techniques. Professor Hwang Hye-ju from Mokpo National University has set up the first earthen research centre in Korea and the architecture department of this university has become the first in the nation to offer classes on earthen architecture. Some Choga houses and villages are listed as National Heritage by Cultural Heritage Administration of Korea, reflecting that there is cultural and historical acknowledgement of this type of dwelling. However there is a lack of progress in terms of studying and developing new earthen materials and conserving traditional usage of materials and techniques.

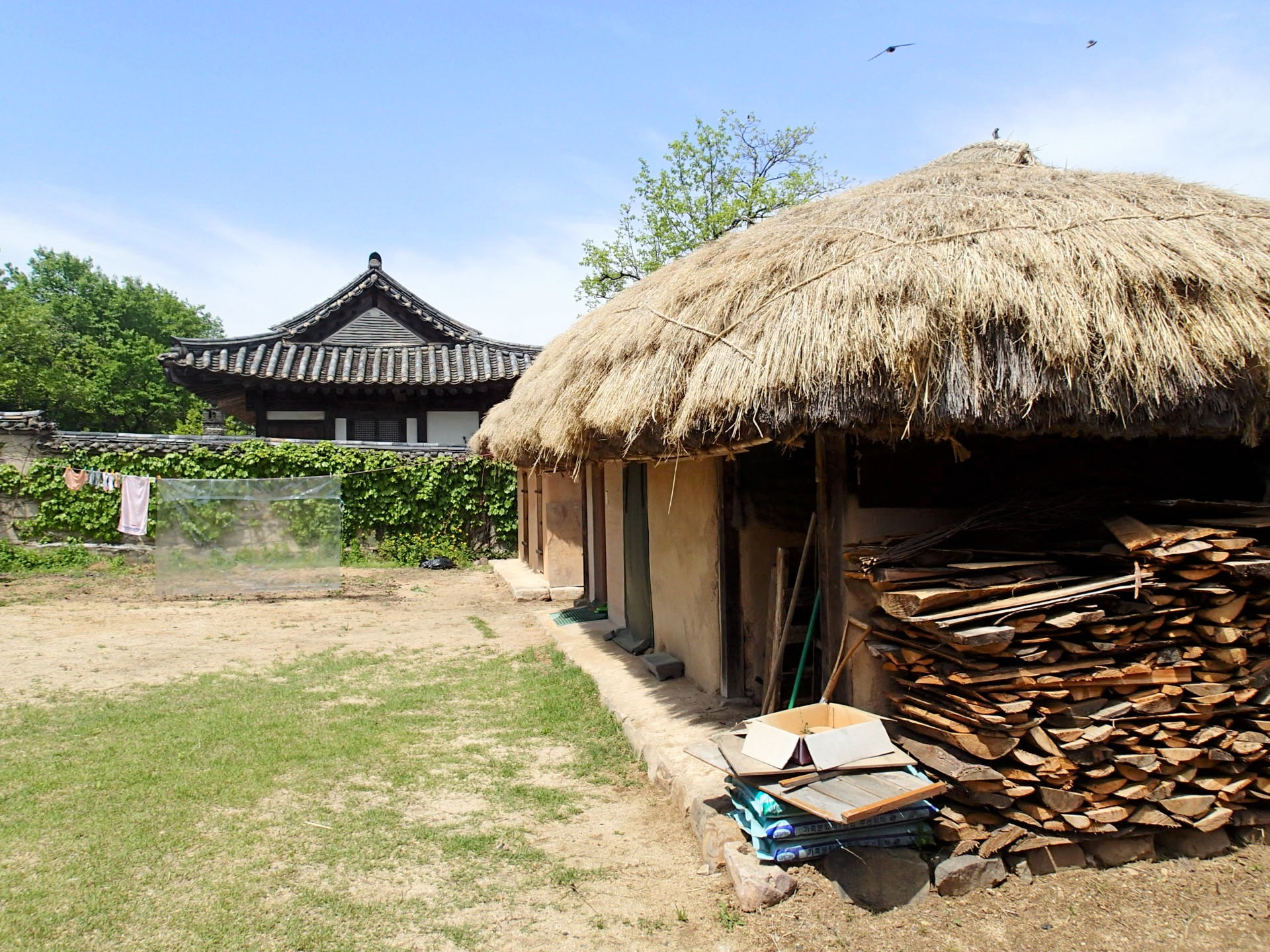
Hahoe Folk Village

The most considerable form of preservation of choga is through villages adapted into cultural attractions. Prime examples include the Hahoe Folk village, a UNESCO recognised heritage site which has managed to preserve Korean houses from over 600 years ago, and the Korean Folk Village, which showcases replicas of traditional dwellings inclusive of ones resided by the working and peasant classes.

In Jeju Island, the local government as well as local architects have made efforts to apply local materials and traditional techniques to make building designs reflective of Jeju's natural environment and therefore create regional uniqueness. However these attempts have been criticised as architectural ornamentation and are ambiguous in reflecting the philosophical, environmental and cultural profundities of traditional choga. In other areas across Korea, efforts in studying as well as incorporating elements of choga into modern day architecture have been singular and individualistic. One of the leading architects in advocating for the revitalisation of earthen architecture is Kiyong Jung. Due a lack of prior research, he has travelled across Korea to examine traditional chogas and to discover traditional earthen construction techniques and learned how to construct choga's wooden framework from a villager. From this research, he carried out notable projects including the private residence of ex-president Roh Moo-hyun and the Muju Public Construction Project - Jindo-li community building which became one of the first public buildings built with earthen materials. However the project was opposed by civilians in surrounding areas as they think the building would smell like dirt and not be strong enough, lengthening the construction time to 2 years.

Some other notable examples of modern Korean architects experimenting with techniques used to build choga:

The Blind Whale maintains the traditional look of Chojip by renovating an existing structure with modern interior design and materials, maintaining its distinct roof design.

The Jeju Ball hotel utilises traditional volcanic stone by incorporating it into the roof and walls.

== See also ==
- Hanok
- Housing in South Korea
