= Gye-dong =

- Gye-dong gil
- Interactive map of Gye-dong
- Country: South Korea

Area
  - Total: 0.17 km^{2} (0.066 sq mi)

Korean name
- Hangul: 계동
- Hanja: 桂洞
- RR: Gye-dong
- MR: Kye-dong

Gye-dong (Korean: 계동) is a dong (neighborhood) of Jongno District, Seoul, South Korea. It is a legal dong (법정동 法定洞) administered under its administrative dong (행정동 行政洞), Gahoe-dong.

Jungangtang, Korea's oldest public bathhouse, is situated on the northern end of the main street. It also has an old hardware store and sesame oil shop from the 1970s, as well as eateries and cafes in the same style.

== See also ==
- Administrative divisions of South Korea
