= Gahoe-dong =

Neighborhood of Seoul, South Korea

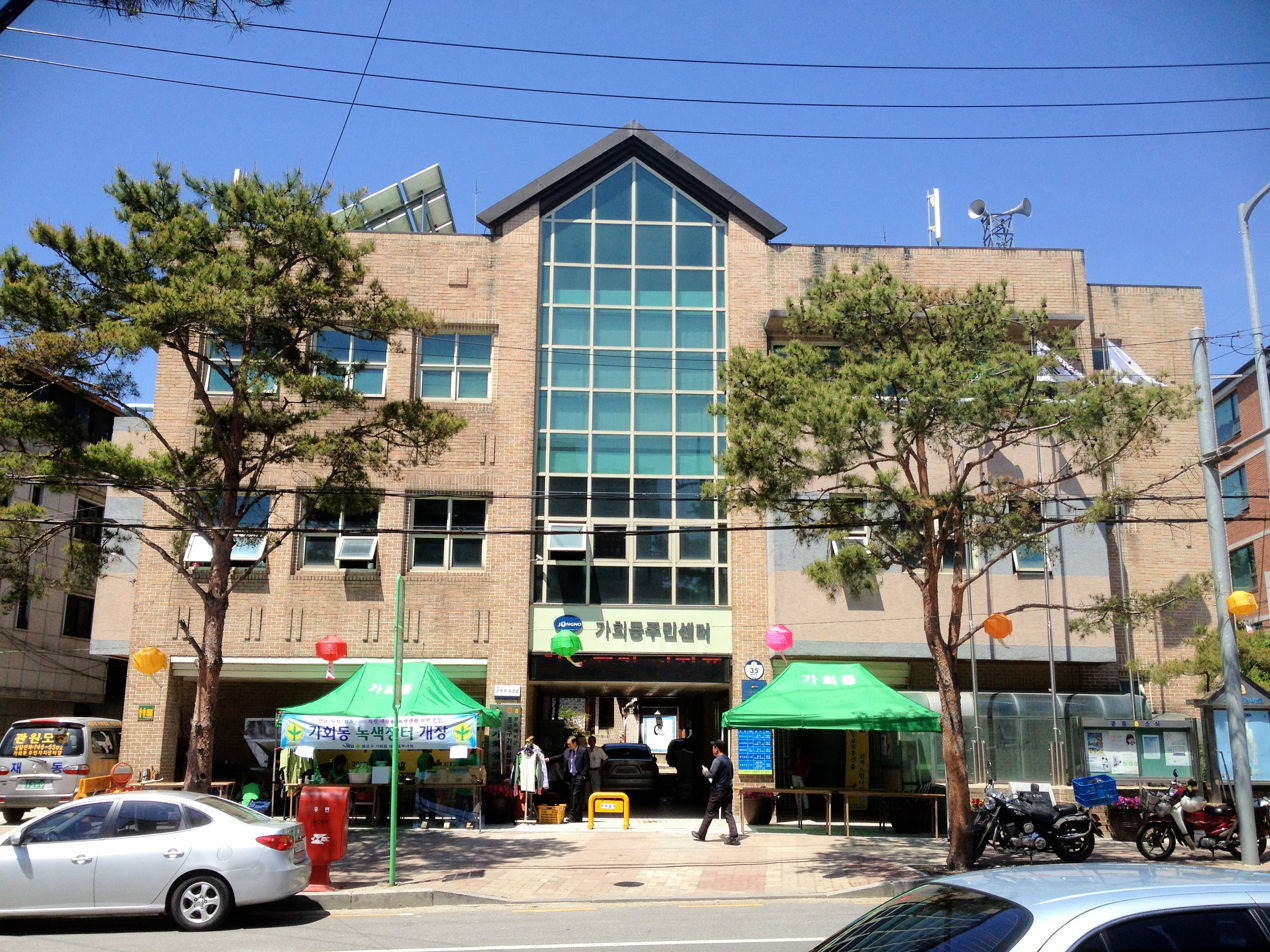
- View from Gahoe-dong Catholic Church Gahoe-dong Community Service Center
- Interactive map of Gahoe-dong
- Country: South Korea

Area
  - Total: 0.54 km^{2} (0.21 sq mi)

Population (2001)
  - Total: 7,208
  - Density: 13,000/km^{2} (35,000/sq mi)

Korean name
- Hangul: 가회동
- Hanja: 嘉會洞
- RR: Gahoe-dong
- MR: Kahoe-dong

Gahoe-dong (Korean: 가회동) is a dong (neighborhood) of Jongno District, Seoul, South Korea.

The area used to be an exclusive area for nobles, scholars, and homes of government officials hence it was well-maintained. Many of the hanok, Korean traditional houses, have been remodeled into cafe, restaurant and teahouses.

== See also ==
- Gahoe Museum
- Administrative divisions of South Korea
