= Korean Folk Village =

Tourist attraction in Yongin, South Korea

Coordinates: 37.25892°N 127.1181°E

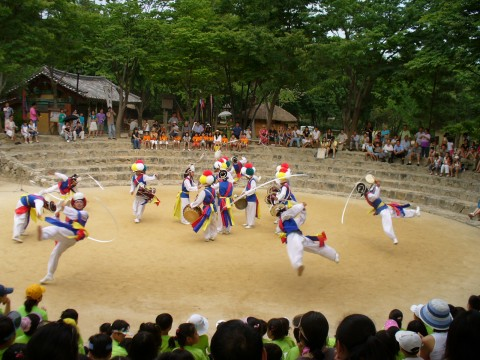
- A performance of the farmers' dance at Korean Folk Village

Korean name
- Hangul: 한국민속촌
- Hanja: 韓國民俗村
- RR: Hanguk minsokchon
- MR: Han'guk minsokch'on

Korean Folk Village (Korean: 한국민속촌) is a living museum type of tourist attraction in the city of Yongin, a satellite city in the Seoul Metropolitan Area in the province of Gyeonggi in South Korea. It was first opened on October 3, 1974 (ground breaking in 1973 and completion in 1974). Korean Folk Village is a popular tourist destination for both Koreans and foreigners, located near South Korea's largest amusement park, Everland.

Real houses from across the country were relocated and restored to create a replica of a village from the late Joseon period. Events such as celebrating seasonal changes and traditional performances are held in KFV. The village is set up in a natural environment occupying 300,000 Korean pyeong (245 acres; 991,735 m^{2}; 10,674,952 sq ft). Over 260 traditional houses reminiscent of the late Joseon Dynasty can be found there. The purpose of the Korean Folk Village is to display elements of traditional Korean life and culture. There are multiple sections to the park, including numerous replicas of traditional houses of the different social classes (peasant, landowner, yangban) from various regions.

== History ==
The Korean Folk Village was the first open-air museum constructed in South Korea. Construction of the Korean Folk Village began as a way to preserve traditional Korean culture and customs, including traditional Korean architecture, food, and clothing in response to the rapid westernisation and industrialisation of Korea during the 1960s. The village's buildings have either been restored or relocated from other provinces around Korea.

== Living culture experience ==
Inside the folk village, staff members dress in distinctive costumes depicting several characters from the Joseon Dynasty such as Sato (the governors), Daejanggeum (a royal of the palace), kumiho (legendary fox with nine tails), Geosang (business magnate), etc.

There are typically four cultural performances: a Nong-ak play, tightrope play, horseback martial art play, and a traditional wedding. These performances are performed on each stage twice a day. Moreover, the folk village offers other cultural experiences including:

- Ferry
- Horseback riding
- Natural dyeing experience
- Traditional life experience
- Family park performance
- Main performance

The village consists of Joseon-period houses and workshops, where visitors can enjoy the architectural characteristics of the Joseon dynasty and experience traditional crafts.

Traditional Korean wedding ceremonies are offered.

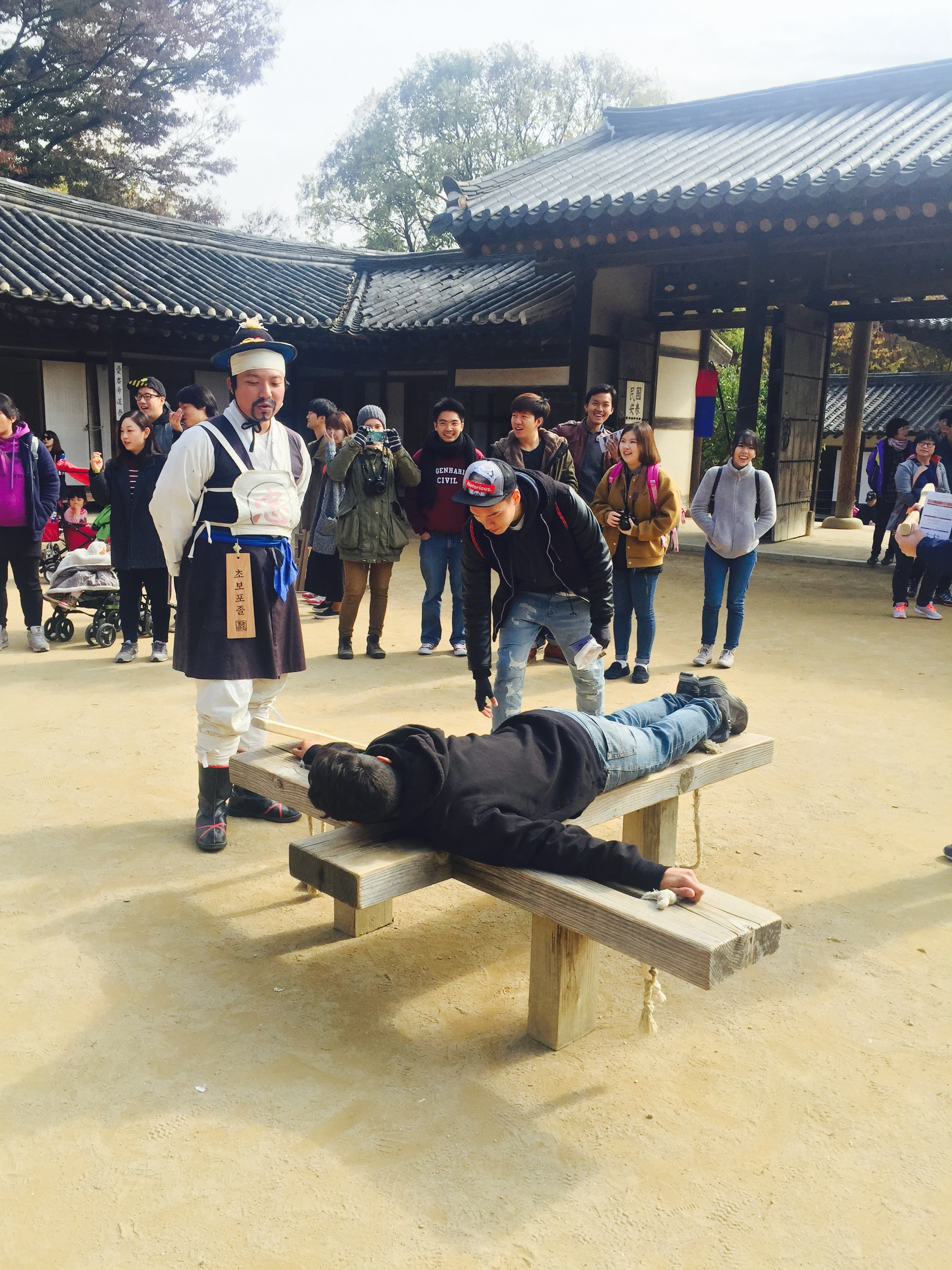
Flog experience at Korean Folk Village

== Location, access, and facilities ==
=== Facilities ===
The park's facilities consist of a traditional street market, restaurants, and showcases of traditional woodworking and metalworking techniques. Also, traditional dances, equestrian skills, and marriage ceremonies are performed at different locations around the park. Several arts and crafts shops with food produced by local artisans, recreational activities, and restaurants can be found as well.

The amusement park section has rides and games, an art museum, a sculpture garden, a Korean Folk Museum, and a World Folk Museum which highlights traditional lifestyles from around the world.

The village was used as a filming location for Munhwa Broadcasting Corporation (MBC)'s 2012 drama Moon Embracing the Sun as local markets, private residences of commoners, and night scenes.

The park features several exhibition halls:

- Nine world folk exhibition hall (860 cultural artefacts).
- One earth ware exhibition hall (approximately 3,000 cultural artefacts).
- One masked dance exhibition hall (30 cultural artefacts).

==== Food and Shopping ====
Snack bars can be found in the food market, also known as Jumak, where visitors can enjoy various types of Korean food. These include sweet ice-cream, Winibini candy (also known as Weeny Beeny), Railroad hotdog and Imsil cheese pizza.

There are a total of 11 souvenir shops. Visitors can buy traditional instruments, artworks, accessories. There is also a convenience store and toy shop called Toy Village.

==== Attraction ====
Several attraction sites of the village include bumper cars, Music express, Biking, Family Costa, Boat ride, Bounce spin, and Sled slope in winter.

== Dramas filmed onsite ==
- Kingdom (킹덤): Some scenes were filmed onsite.
- Jewel in the Palace (대장금): the series was aired on MBC from 2003 to 2004.
- Sungkyunkwan Scandal (성균관 스캔들): the 2010 K-drama was filmed onsite.

== Welcome to Joseon festival ==
The cultural theme park hosts the Welcome to Joseon Variety Festival each spring. The program is presented by Joseon-period characters who appear in ancient fairy tales and stories. During the festival, visitors are encouraged to directly engage with the cultural performances.

== Gallery ==
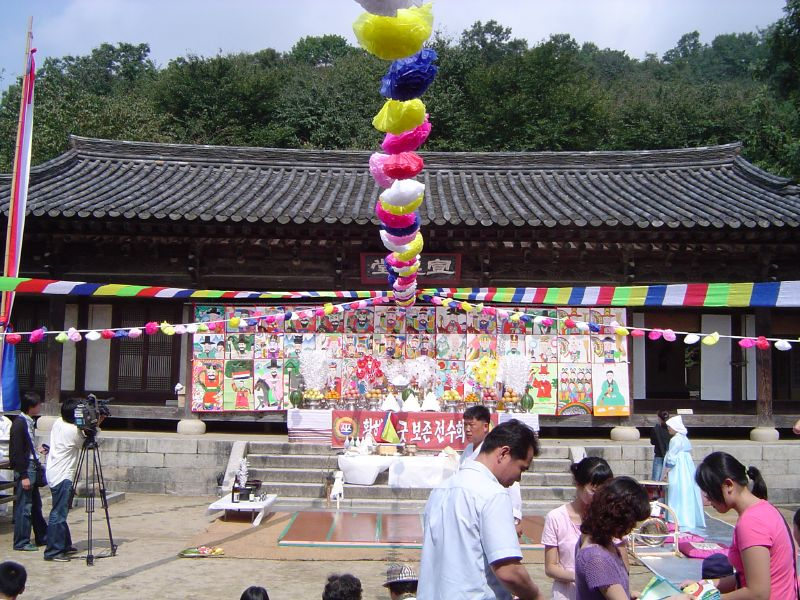

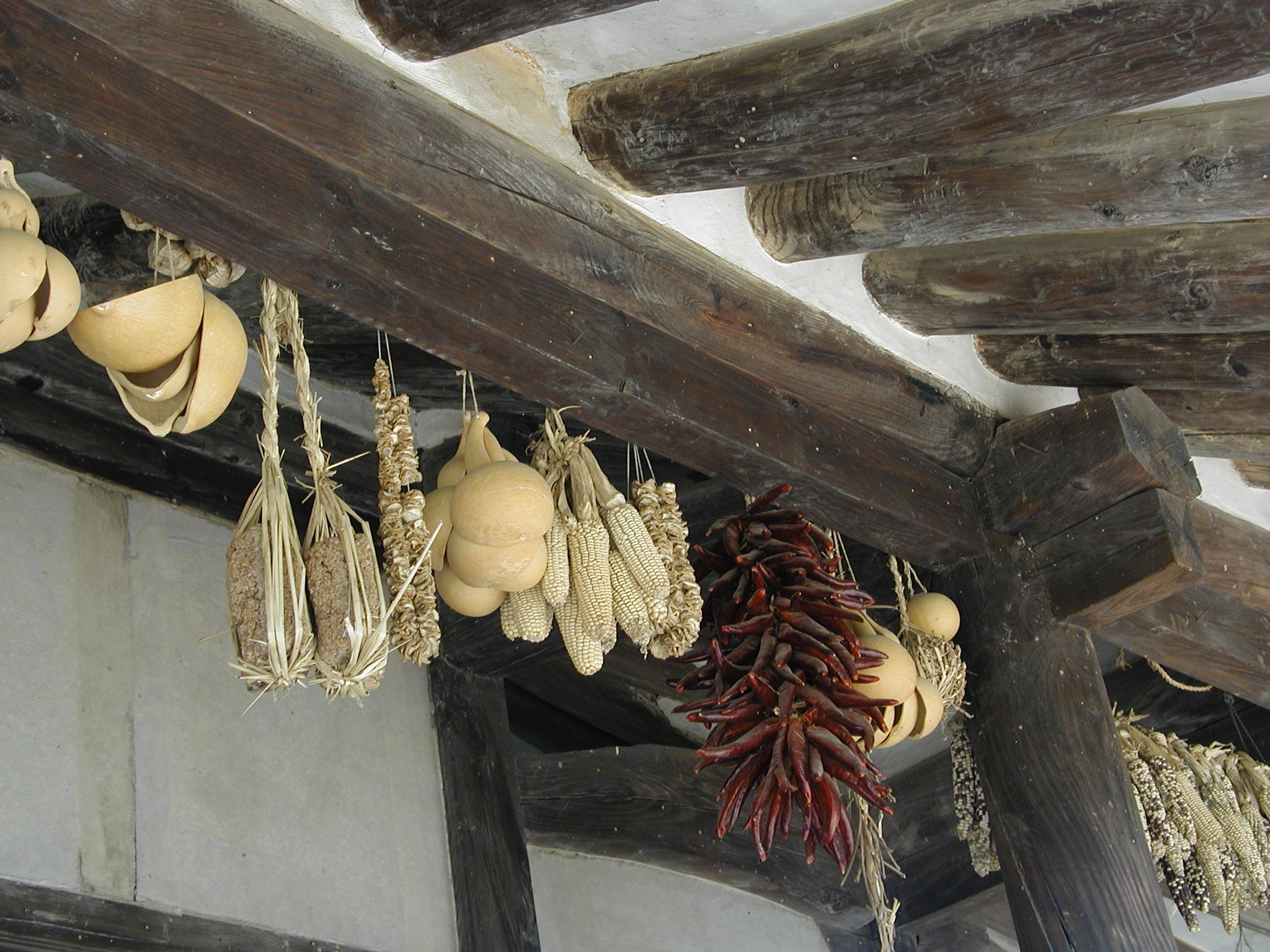

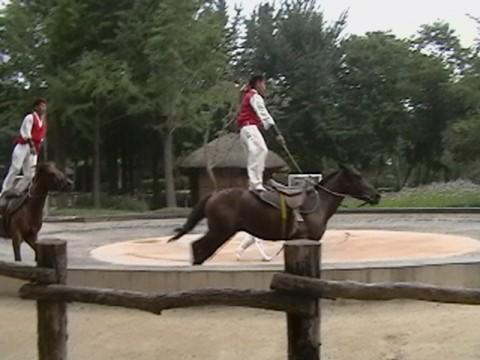
Equestrian skills displayed

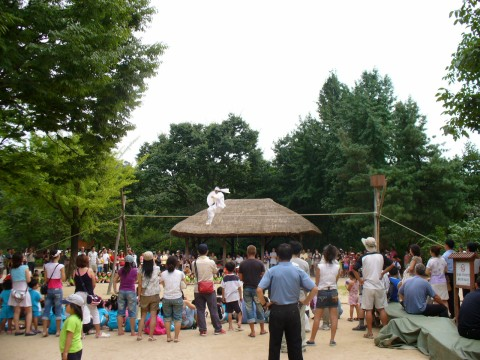
A tightrope walker

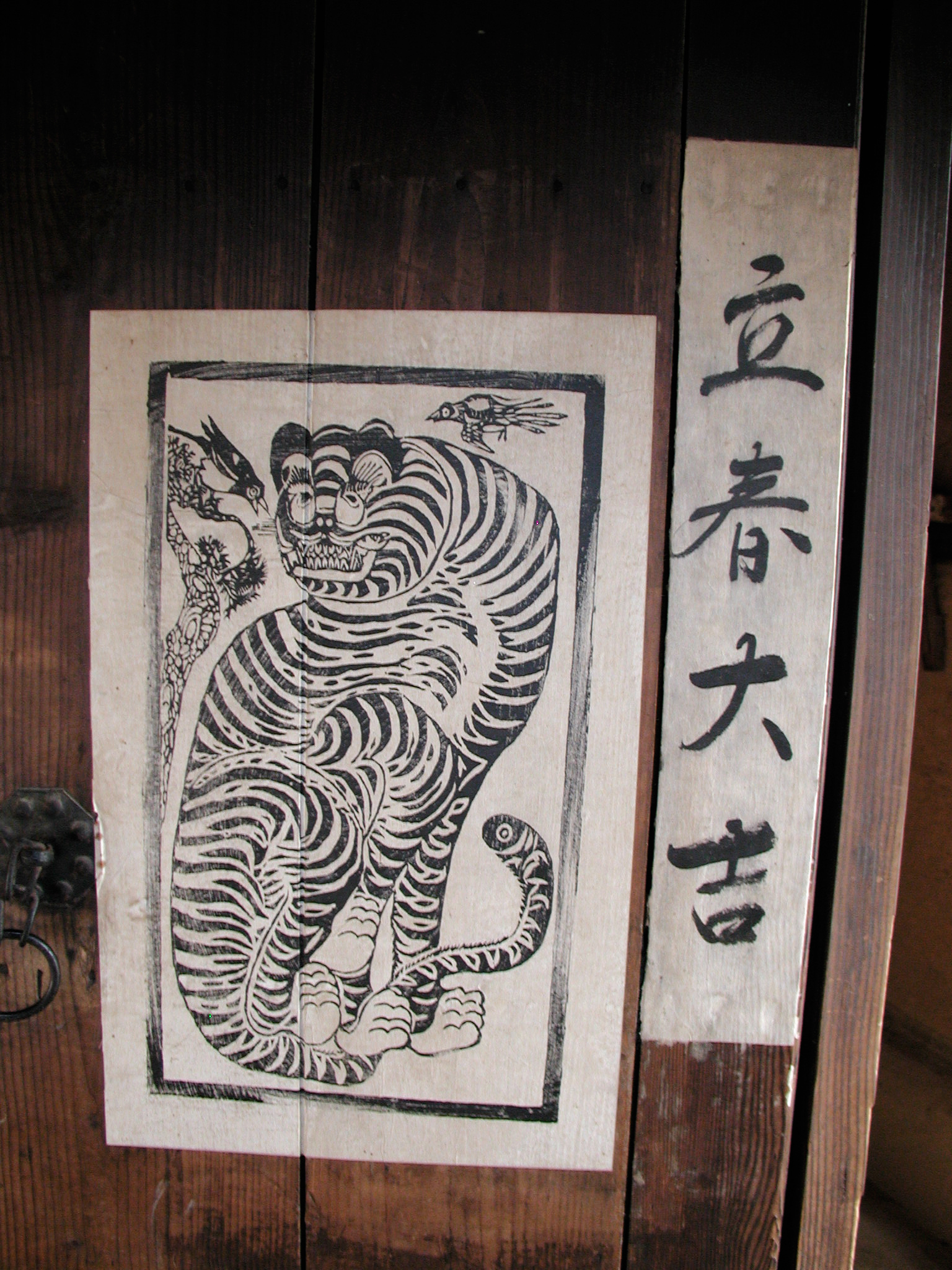

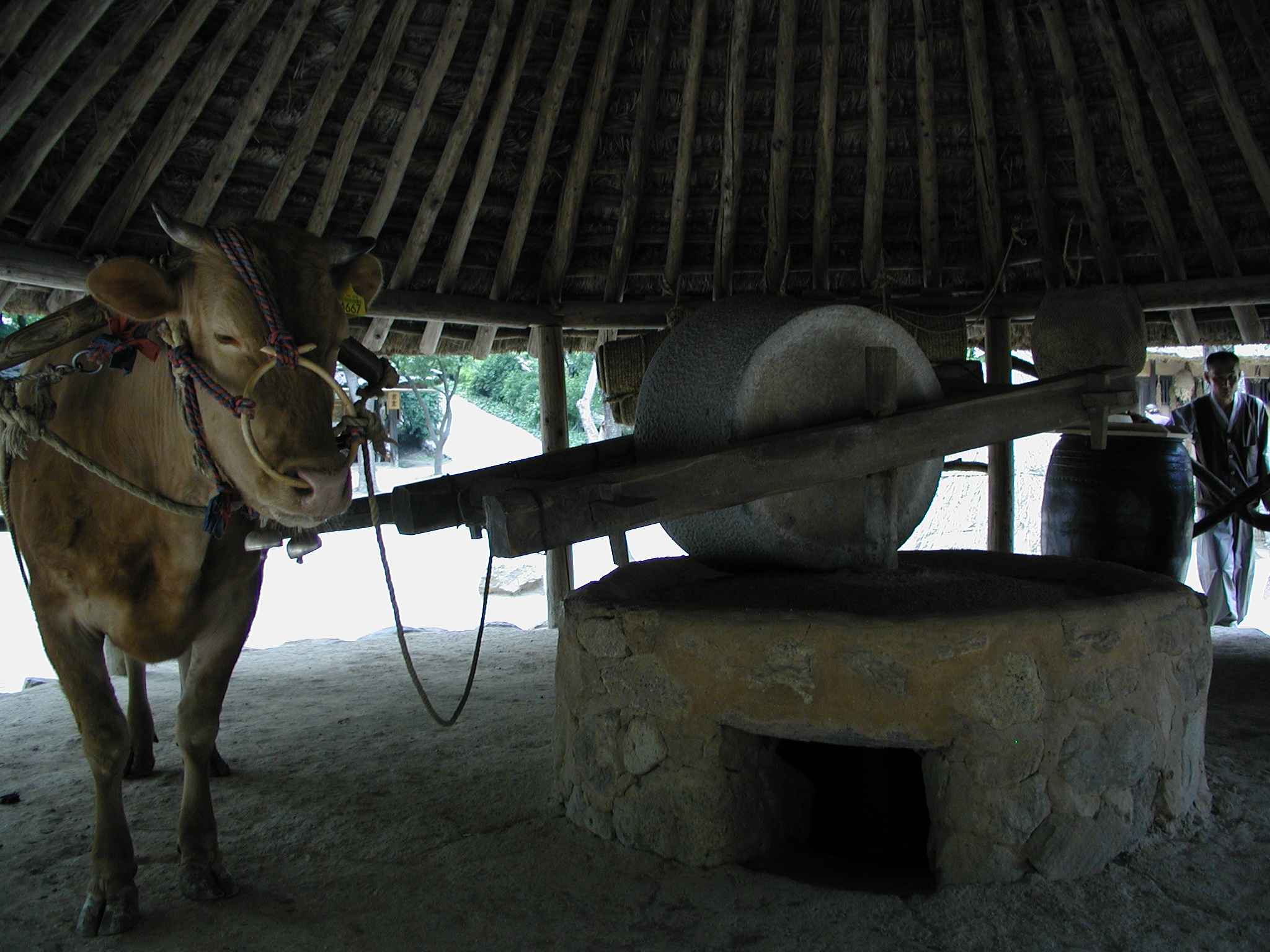

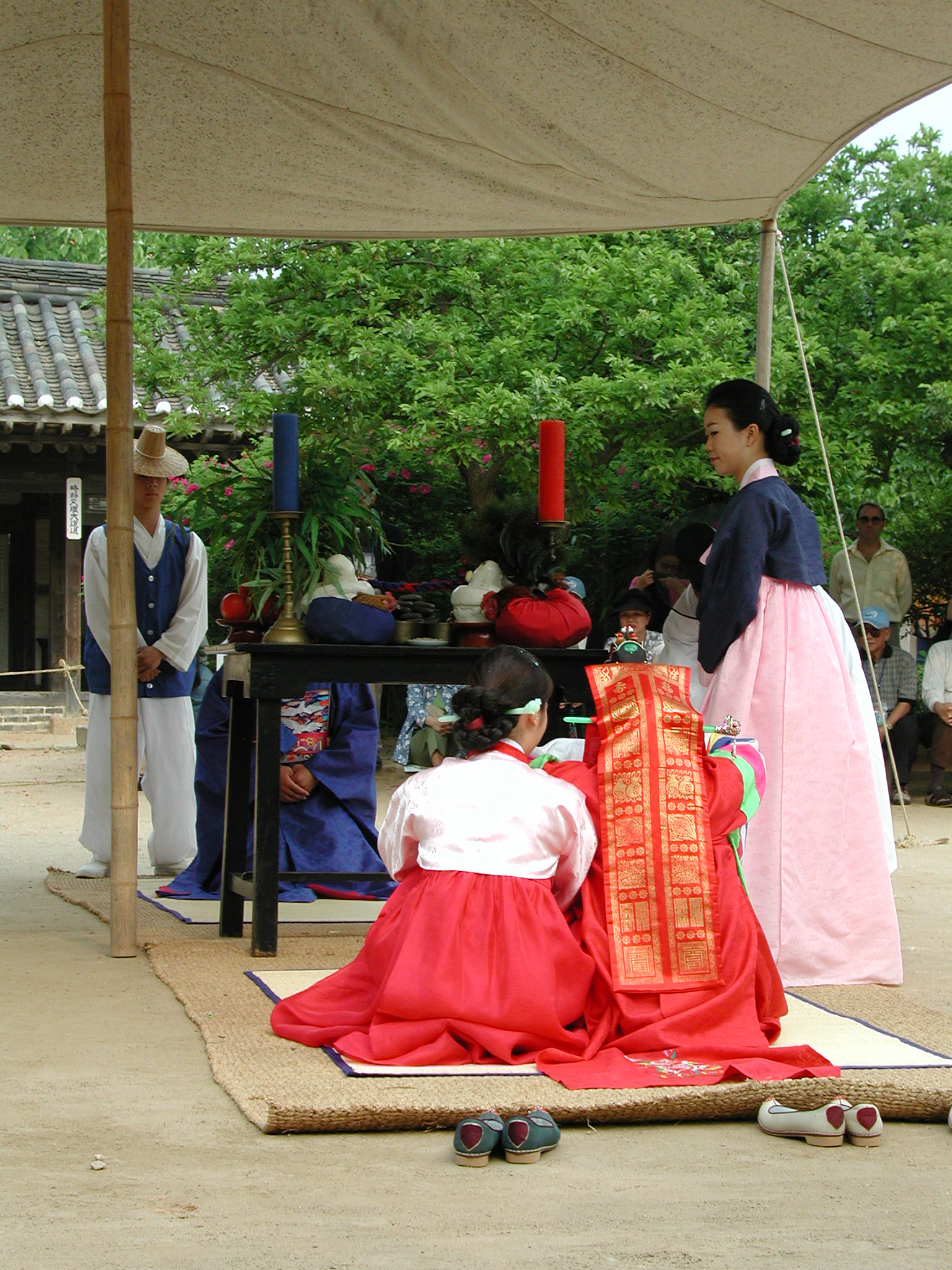
