= List of parks in Daegu =

This is a list of parks in Daegu, South Korea.

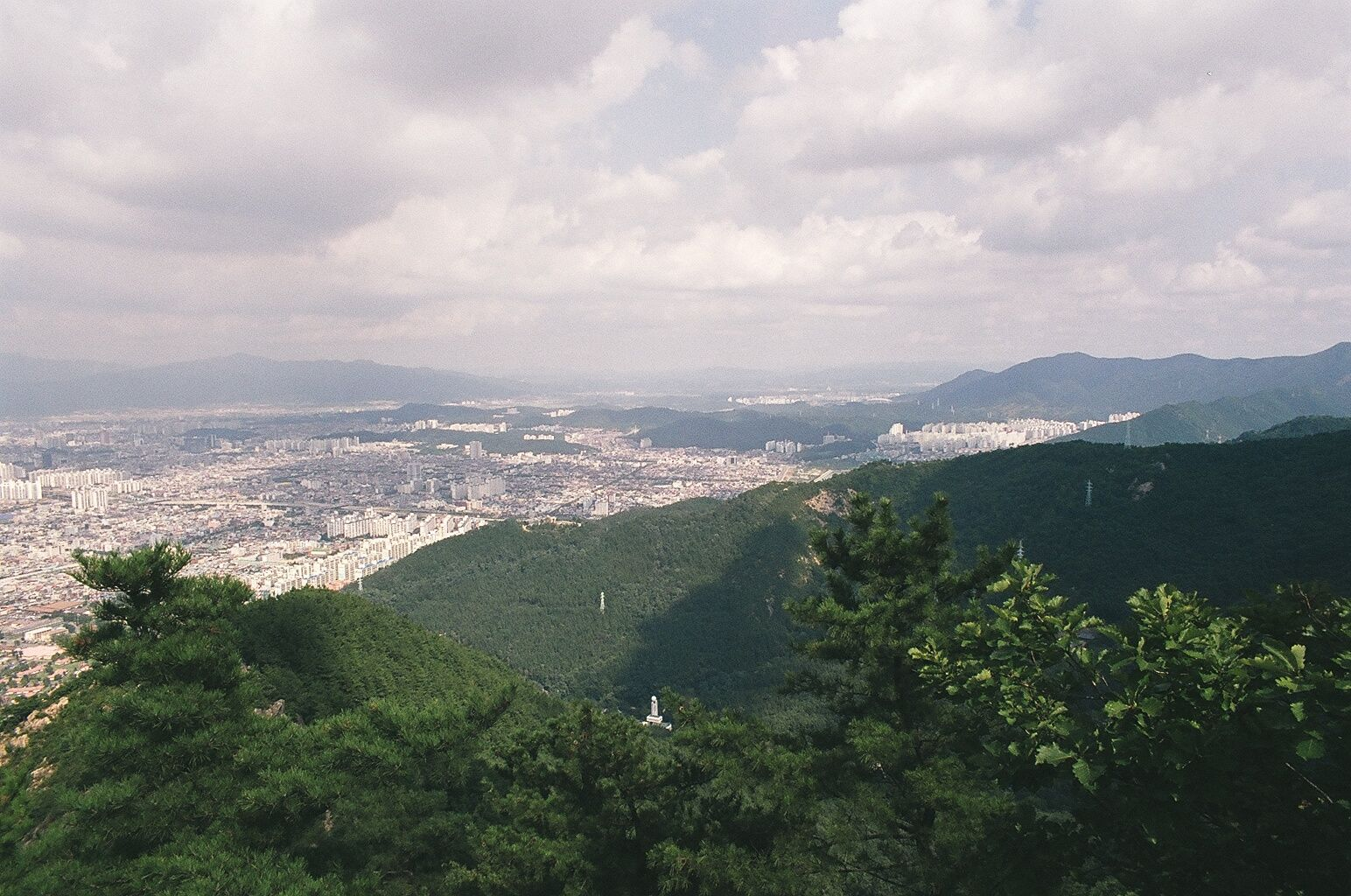
View of south-western Daegu from Apsan Park, including some of the hills that line the southern edge of the city.

Park	Korean name	Location	Area (m^{2})	Link
Bongmu Leports Park	봉무레포츠공원	Dong-gu	m^{2}	
Haksan Park	학산공원	Dalseo-gu	m^{2}	
Daegok Park	대곡공원	Dalseo-gu	m^{2}	
Apsan Park	앞산공원	Nam-gu	m^{2}	
Dalseong Park	달성공원	Jung-gu	m^{2}	
Duryu Park	두류공원	Dalseo-gu	m^{2}	
Dowon Park	도원공원	Dalseo-gu	m^{2}	
Gamsammot Park	감삼못공원	Seo-gu	m^{2}	
Gukchae-bosang Memorial Park	국채보상운동기념공원	Jung-gu	42,509 m^{2}	
Gwaneum Park	관음공원	Buk-gu	m^{2}	
Gyeongsang-gamyeong Park	경상감영공원	Jung-gu	14,835 m^{2}	
Haebaragi Park	해바라기공원	Buk-gu	m^{2}	
Hwawon Park	화원유원지	Dalseong-gun	m^{2}	
Janggi-taekji Park	장기택지공원	Dalseo-gu	m^{2}	
Mangudang Park	망우당공원	Dong-gu	m^{2}	
Herbhillz	허브힐즈	Dalseong-gun	m^{2}	
Gangchang Park	강창공원	Dalseo-gu	m^{2}	
Seongseo Park 1	성수1공원	Dalseo-gu	m^{2}	
Seongseo Park 2	성수2공원	Dalseo-gu	m^{2}	
Seongseo Park 3	성수3공원	Dalseo-gu	m^{2}	
Seongseo Park 4	성수4공원	Dalseo-gu	m^{2}	
Seongseo Park 5	성수5공원	Dalseo-gu	m^{2}	
Seongseo Park 6	성수6공원	Dalseo-gu	m^{2}	
Seongseo Park 7	성수7공원	Dalseo-gu	m^{2}	
Seongseo Park 8	성수8공원	Dalseo-gu	m^{2}	
Unamji Waterside Park	운암지수변공원	Nam-gu	m^{2}	
Wolchon Park	월촌공원	Dalseo-gu	m^{2}	
Wolgok Park	월곡공원	Dalseo-gu	m^{2}	
Wolgwang Waterside Park	월광수변공원	Dalseo-gu	m^{2}	
Wolseong Park 1	월성1공원	Dalseo-gu	m^{2}	
Wolseong Park 2	월성2공원	Dalseo-gu	m^{2}	
Yongsan Park	용산공원	Dalseo-gu	m^{2}	
February 28th Memorial Central Park	2‧28기념중앙공원	Jung-gu	12,637 m^{2}	
Dongchon Park	동촌유원지	Dong-gu	m^{2}	
Suseong Lake	수성못	Suseong-gu	m^{2}	

== See also ==
- List of parks in Seoul
- Geography of South Korea
- List of rivers of Korea
