= List of parks in Seoul =

This is a list of parks in Seoul, South Korea.

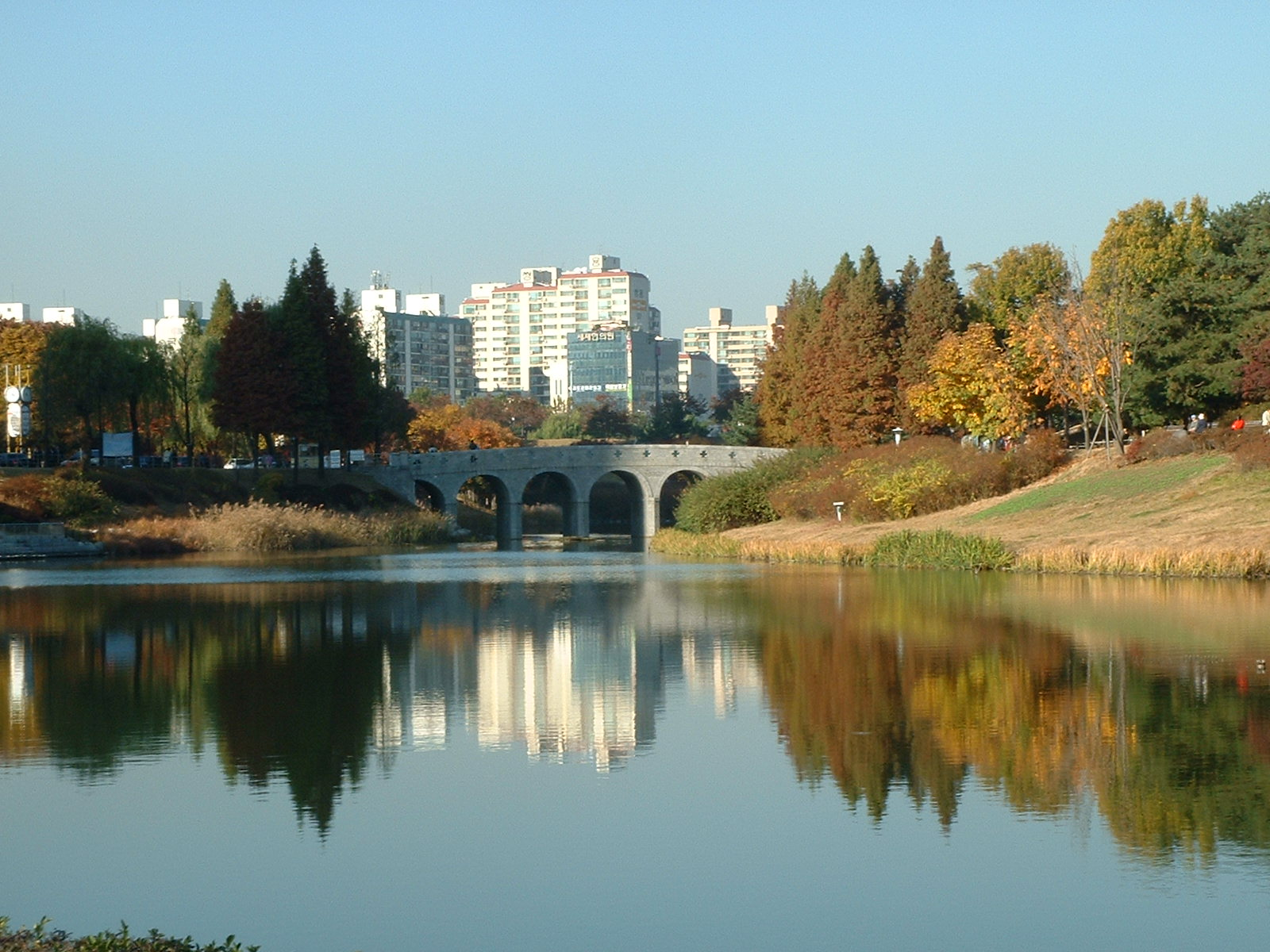
Olympic Park located in Bangi-dong, Songpa District, Seoul.

Park	Korean name	Location - Dong	Location - Gu	Area (m^{2})	Ref
Achasan Echological Park	아차산 생태공원	Gwangjang-dong	Gwangjin District	23,450m^{2}	
Bangi-dong Marsh Area	방이동습지(방이동 생태경관보전지역)	Bangi-dong	Songpa District	58,909 m^{2}	
Boramae Park	보라매공원	Sindaebang-dong	Dongjak District	424,106 m^{2}	
Dongmyo Park	동묘공원(동관왕묘)	Sungin-dong	Jongno District	9,315m^{2}	
Cheonhodong Park	천호동공원	Cheonho-dong	Gangdong District	26,696.80 m^{3}	
Children's Grand Park	어린이대공원	Neung-dong	Gwangjin District	593,036 m^{2}	
Dosan Park	도산공원	Sinsa-dong	Gangnam District	29,816.5 m^{2}	
Dunchun-dong Marsh Area	둔촌동습지(둔촌동 생태경관보전지역)	Dunchon-dong	Gangdong District	24,696 m^{2}	
Eungbong Park	응봉공원	Geumho 1ga-dong	Seongdong District	80,309 m^{2}	
Gandeme Park	간데메공원	Dapsipni 3-dong	Dongdaemun District	15,179.7 m^{2}	District/dapsim-ri3-dong/2000-10/1106062_000_001.html
Gupabal Fall	구파발폭포	Jingwanoe-dong	Eunpyeong District	6669 m^{2}	
Gwanghwamun Plaza	광화문시민열린마당	Sejongno	Jongno District	8,948.1 m^{2}	
Hakdong Park	학동공원	Nonhyeon-dong	Gangnam District	29,947 m^{2} (322,350 ft^{2})	
Hunlyunwon Park	훈련원공원	Euljiro 5 ga	Jung District	16,734.60 m^{3}	
Hwangudan Park	환구단공원	Sogong-dong	Jung District	8,661.16 m^{2}	
Independence Park	독립공원	Hyunjeo-dong	Seodaemun District	109.193.8 m^{2}	
Jangchungdan Park	장충단 공원	Jangchung-dong	Jung District	297,000 m^{2}	
Jungmaru Park	중마루공원	Yeongdeungpo-dong 2ga	Yeongdeungpo District	6,456 m^{3}	
Kildong Ecological Park	길동자연생태공원	Gil-dong	Gangdong District	80,683 m^{2}	
Marronnier Park	마로니에 공원	Daehangno	Jongno District	5,802 m^{2}	
Mullae Park	문래공원	Mullae-dong	Yeongdeungpo District		
Naksan Park	낙산공원	Dongsung-dong	Jongno District	201,779 m^{3}	
Namsan Park	남산공원		Jung District, Yongsan District	2,935,762 m^{3}	
Maewha Park	매화공원	Deungchon-dong	Gangseo District	1,980 m^{2}	
Nadeuri Park	나들이공원	Mangu-dong	Jungnang District	263,600 m^{2}	
Nakseongdae Park	낙성대공원	Bongchon 7-dong	Gwanak District	31,350m^{2}	
Olympic Park, Seoul	올림픽공원	Bangi-dong	Songpa District	1,477,122 m^{2}	
Saetmaeul Park	샛마을공원	Myeongil 1-dong	Gangdong District	25,000 m^{2}	
Sajik Park	사직공원	Sajik-dong	Jongno District	168,099.87 m^{2}	
Sayuksin Park	사육신공원	Noryangjin 1-dong	Dongjak District	47,832.0 m^{2}	
Seokchon Lake Park	석촌호수공원(송파나루공원)	Jamsil-dong	Songpa District	285,757 m^{2}	
Seongsoo Park	성수공원(성수근린공원)	Seongsu-dong	Seongdong District	5,197.7 m^{2}	
Seoul Forest	서울숲	Seongsu-dong	Seongdong District	1,156,498 m^{2}	
Tapgol Park	탑골공원	Jongno 2ga	Jongno District	19,599.70 m^{3}	
Tancheon	탄천	Suseo-dong, Garak-dong	Gangnam District, Songpa District	1,151,466 m^{2}	
Waryong Park	와룡공원	Myeongnyun-dong	Jongno District		
Worldcup Park	월드컵공원	Sangam-dong	Mapo District	3,471,090 m^{2}	
Yangjae Citizens' Forest	시민의숲	Yangjae 2-dong	Seocho District	258,992 m^{2}	
Yeouido Park	여의도공원	Yeouido-dong	Yeongdeungpo District	229,539 m^{2}	
Yeouido Saetgang Ecological Park	여의도샛강 생태공원	Yeouido-dong	Yeongdeungpo District	182,000 m^{2}	
Yeongdeungpo Park	영등포공원	Yeongdeungpo-dong	Yeongdeungpo District	61,544 m^{2}	
Yongsan Park	용산공원	Yongsan-dong	Yongsan District	75,900 m^{2}	
Yongma Park	용마공원	Junggok-dongGwangjang-dong, Mangu-dong	Gwangjin District, Jungnang District	5,107,964 m^{2}	

== See also ==
- List of parks in Daegu
- List of rivers of Korea
- Geography of South Korea
