= Dongchon =

- Former township
- Country: South Korea
- Province: Daegu
- District: Dong District
- Communities: 6 hangjeongdong and 10–11 beopjeongdong
- Website: Dong District

Korean name
- Hangul: 동촌
- Hanja: 東村
- RR: Dongchon
- MR: Tongch'on

Dongchon (Korean: 동촌) was the name of a historical township in the present day Dalseong County of North Gyeongsang province in South Korea. The area corresponds to the present day neighborhoods (dong) of Dong District of Daegu in the southwestern part of Korean Peninsula. It was earlier known as the "Haean-myeon", which in 1940 was renamed to "Dongchon-myeon", and in 1958 it officially became one of the neighborhoods of the expanding Daegu. The historic Town Office of Dongchon was located in the Ipseok-dong area, which is now crowded with people.

== Communities ==
The historic Dongchon area corresponds to the following 6 present day neighborhoods (dong) of Dong District of Daegu metropolitan city.

Beopjeongdong (ancient name)	Hangul	Hanja	Name before 1914 (before Japanese colonial rule)	Hangjeongdong (present day name)
Bullo-dong	불로동	不老洞	Bullo-dong; Hyeonsang-dong; Guseong-dong	Bullobongmu-dong
Bongmu-dong	봉무동	鳳舞洞	Bongmu-dong; Dansan-dong; Dogam-dong; Oenam-dong	Bullobongmu-dong
Jijeo-dong	지저동	枝底洞	Jijeo-dong	Jijeo-dong
Do-dong	도동	道洞	Do-dong; Sanghyang-dong; Hahyang-dong	Dopyeong-dong
Pyeonggwang-dong (Note: Pyeonggwang-dong, part of Gongsan was incorporated into Dongchon in 1958.)	평광동	坪廣洞	Pyeongni-dong; Bukgwang-dong; Namgwang-dong	Dopyeong-dong
Geomsa-dong	검사동	檢沙洞	Geomsa-dong; Yeoncheon-dong	Dopyeong-dong
Geomsa-dong	검사동	檢沙洞	Geomsa-dong; Yeoncheon-dong	Dongchon-dong
Ipseok-dong	입석동	立石洞	Ipseok-dong; Dosin-dong	Dongchon-dong
Bangchon-dong	방촌동	芳村洞	Bangchon-dong; Gyeogyang-dong	Bangchon-dong
Bangchon-dong	방촌동	芳村洞	Bangchon-dong; Gyeogyang-dong	Haean-dong
Dunsan-dong	둔산동	屯山洞	Dunsan-dong; Daeam-dong; Chil-dong (Otgol); Sang-dong	Haean-dong
Bu-dong	부동	釜洞	Bu-dong; Gumyeong-dong; Wolcheon-dong	Haean-dong
Sinpyeong-dong	신평동	新坪洞	Pyeongni-dong; Sindeok-dong	Haean-dong

== Attractions ==
- Bongmu Leports Park
- Otgol Village
- Daegu International Airport
