= River's Edge (disambiguation) =

River's Edge is a 1986 American crime drama film.

River's Edge may also refer to:

== Arts and entertainment ==
- The River's Edge, a 1957 American film noir
- River's Edge (manga), written by Kyoko Okazaki, 1993
  - River's Edge (2018 film), a Japanese film adaptation

== Places in Canada ==
- River's Edge, Edmonton
- River's Edge, Saskatchewan

== See also ==
- River Edge, New Jersey
- Water's Edge (disambiguation)
- Riverside (disambiguation)
