= Water's Edge (disambiguation) =

Water's Edge is a 1996 song by Seven Mary Three

Water's Edge may refer to:

- Water's Edge, an instrumental track by Daylight Dies
- Water's Edge (restaurant), a former restaurant in Long Island City, New York
- Water's Edge, Barton upon Humber, a water park
- Water's Edge Festival a music festival held in Coquitlam, British Columbia
- Wolgwang Water's Edge Park park that is located in Daegu Dalseo-gu, South Korea
- Unamji Water's Edge Park park that is located in Daegu Buk-gu, South Korea
- A concept in Tax consolidation

== See also ==
- Waters Edge
