= MoMA Bookstore =

General information
- Address: 18-10 Dosan-daero 45-gil
- Town or city: Gangnam District, Seoul
- Country: South Korea
- Coordinates: 37.52407343443757°N 127.03628104012128°E
- Opened: September 9, 2025

The MoMA Bookstore is a bookstore in Seoul, South Korea that opened in 2025 as a partnership between the Museum of Modern Art (MoMA) and Hyundai Card. Located in Dosan Park, it is the first bookstore ever opened by the former, other than book sections at MoMA Design Stores, and features over a thousand books and two hundred titles relevant to them arts.

== History ==
The MoMA Bookstore resulted from an idea by Hyundai Card CEO Ted Chung, who wanted to create a new kind of MoMA storefront for Seoul. Its opening marked the twentieth anniversary of an ongoing partnership between MoMA and Hyundai Card.

The two first collaborated in 2006 when the former made its online store available in South Korea. Later, in 2010, holders of the Hyundai Card were given MoMA-related benefits. In 2024, the two launched the Hyundai Card Curatorial Exchange Programme to support "cross-continental dialogue between Korean and American art communities."

Early in 2025, the Hyundai Card MoMA Digital Wall was launched to showcase contemporary art in real time in both New York City and Seoul. On September 9 of that year, the MoMA Bookstore was officially opened to the public in Dosan Park.

Hyundai Card also supports the Hyundai Card Exchange Visitor Program, which allows "a curator with expertise in Korean art to work at MoMA for a year on exhibitions and special programs."
