= Jongno 3-ga =

Neighborhood in Seoul

Jongno 3-ga (Hangeul: 종로3가 Hanja: 鍾路三街) is a side-street and neighborhood in Jongno, Seoul, South Korea. In 2026 it was named "coolest neighborhood in the world" by Time Out magazine. In 2021 it had been ranked the number three "coolest neighborhood“ by Time Out. Prior to the COVID-19 pandemic, the area served as an informal gay nightlife destination. Many pojangmacha (street food stands) line the street. Jongmyo Shrine and Tapgol Park are in the area.

== Transportation ==
On the Seoul Metro the area is served by Jongno 3(sam)-ga station.

== Gallery ==
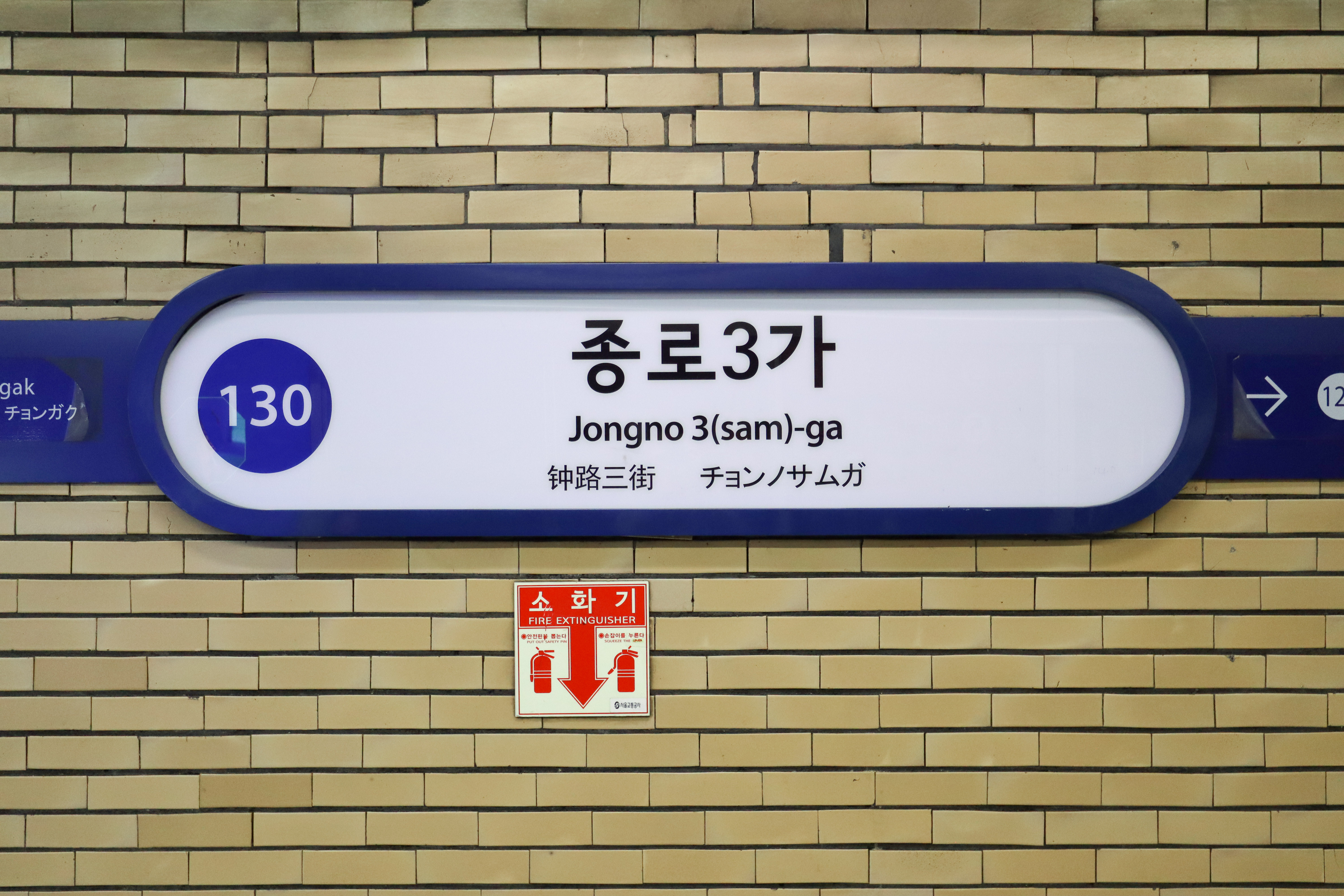
Line 1 station
