= Korean Declaration of Independence =

1919 independence movement document

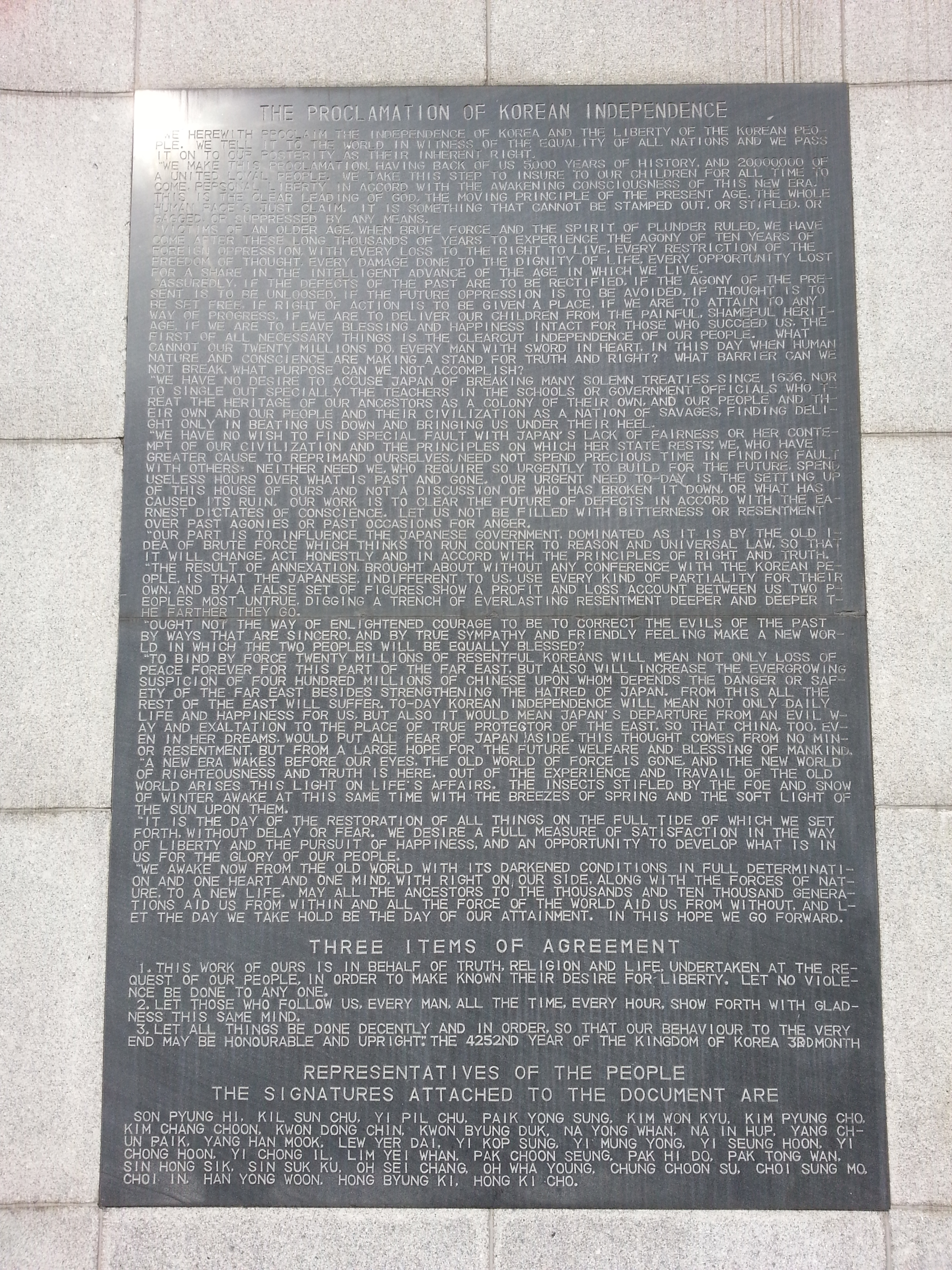
English version of the Proclamation of Korean Independence, displayed in Tapgol Park in Seoul

The Korean Declaration of Independence (Korean: 3·1독립선언서; lit. 'March 1st Declaration of Independence') is the statement adopted by the 33 Korean representatives who met at Taehwagwan, a restaurant located in what is now Insa-dong, Jongno District, Seoul, on March 1, 1919, four months after the end of World War I. The declaration announced that Korea would no longer tolerate Japanese rule.

As reported by The New York Times in 1919: "Korea has proclaimed its independence. What was formerly the Hermit Kingdom, in this, the 4,232 year of its existence, declares through a document signed by thirty-three citizens the liberty of the Korean People."

This event marked the beginning of the March First Movement, which was violently suppressed by Japanese authorities, and served as the cornerstone for the establishment of the Korean Provisional Government one month later. True independence was achieved nearly thirty years later, following the surrender of the Empire of Japan at the end of World War II.

== Drafting and development ==
The development of the declaration began when the leadership of the Christian and Cheondogyo independence movements combined their efforts out of solidarity, viewing national independence as an issue concerning the entire Korean population. Initially, Christian leaders preferred to draft a petition signed by two or three hundred influential individuals to send to the Japanese government, feeling that the general public might not view them as qualified to unilaterally declare independence. However, after joining forces with Cheondogyo leaders, the groups decided to draft both a petition and a formal Declaration of Independence. This approach aimed to present a stronger expression of their desire for self-determination, an concept originating from the Paris Peace Conference that significantly influenced the document's content.

The Christian leaders from the outset recognized the difference between a declaration of independence and a petition. A declaration of independence presented the Japanese government with a fait accompli. The Japanese government had to accept it, which was problematical, or reject it and arrest the authors as presumptuous traitors.

— Frank P. Baldwin, "The March First Movement: Korean Challenge and Japanese Response"

The organizers recognized that this was not the first attempt at a modern declaration; students in Tokyo had recently published the February 8 Declaration of Independence.

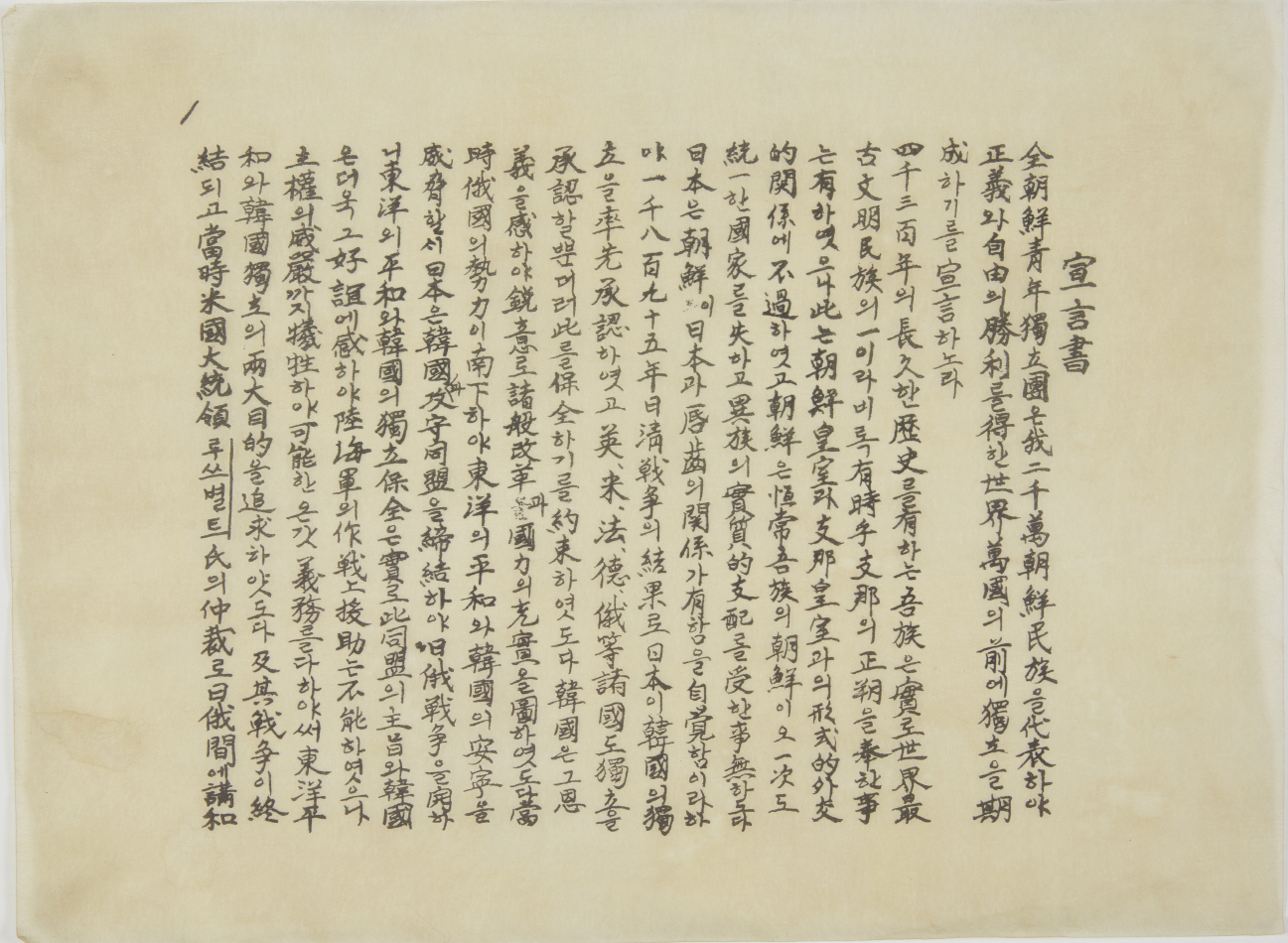
The first page of the February 8 Declaration of Independence, written by students and presented in Tokyo.

The February 8 document focused heavily on the grievances and frustrations of the Korean people, emphasizing the deceptions that led to Korea's annexation and presenting a long history of misconduct by Japan. While core concepts of liberty, justice, and peace carried over to the March 1st Declaration, the drafters of the March 1st document deliberately sought a more moderate and emotionally detached tone.

The February 8 declaration notably was drafted by students and served as a motivating factor for the March 1 declaration. Son Byong-hi requested that Choe Nam-seon draft the text of the March 1 declaration moderately, in contrast to the February 8 Declaration which was more provocative and revolutionary in wording because it was drafted by young students.

— Sarah Kim, "Resistance in Tokyo encouraged the March 1st Movement", Korea JoongAng Daily (February 17, 2019)

Choe Nam-seon served as the primary drafter of the document. He believed that the text needed to be moderate and peaceful in its appeal to secure the sympathy of both Japan and the Western powers meeting at Versailles. He reasoned that the international community would welcome Korean independence if it were framed as a natural desire for national freedom rather than an anti-Japanese sentiment. Although Choe did not sign the final document, he was imprisoned for two years for his role in its creation.

Han Yong-un, a Buddhist reformer, authored the Three Open Pledges located at the end of the text. He offered to revise the entire declaration, but the other movement leaders declined his proposal. Son Byong-hi, a prominent Cheondogyo leader, exercised significant influence over the document and the broader movement, providing essential financial backing and using his organized network of followers throughout Korea. The strategic framework for signing, distributing, and reading the declaration was finalized at Son's residence.

== Religious involvement ==
All 33 signatories of the Declaration of Independence were religious leaders. Under ordinary circumstances, Christian and Cheondogyo organizations maintained different approaches toward the Japanese occupation. The initiative for the declaration was introduced by Christian leaders who wanted to launch a non-violent protest. Although Cheondogyo leaders generally favored a more militant approach, they concluded that a unified front was in the best interest of the nation and agreed to an alliance based on non-violent principles. Consequently, the 33 signatories comprised 16 Christian leaders, 15 Cheondogyo leaders, and 2 Buddhist leaders. Following the public presentation, all signatories were arrested and charged by colonial authorities.

== Printing ==
The printing of the document took place at Boseongsa, a printing shop operated by the Cheondogyo organization, where approximately 21,000 copies were produced the day before distribution. During the printing process, a high-ranking detective from the Jongno Police Station, Shin Cheol, discovered the operation during a raid. He halted the presses and inspected the text in front of Lee Jong-il, the president of Boseongsa. Lee reported the encounter to Choi Rin, who subsequently invited Shin Cheol to dinner to secure his silence. Historical accounts conflict regarding whether Shin Cheol accepted a financial bribe; Japanese records indicate he did, while Korean records claim he refused. Regardless, Shin Cheol did not report the discovery immediately, an incident that historians believe prompted organizers to move the scheduled date of the protest forward from March 3 to March 1.

== Signing and reading ==
The declaration was read and proclaimed at 2:00 p.m. on March 1, 1919, at the Taehwagwan Restaurant (historically associated with the Myongwolgwan) near Pagoda Park in Seoul. The organizers chose this indoor location to prevent immediate conflict between the gathering crowds of Korean students and colonial authorities.

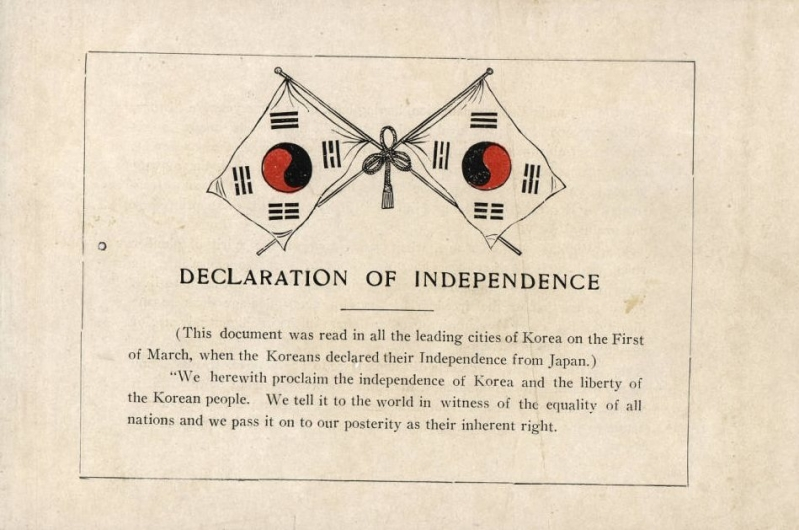
An English translation of the Korean Declaration of Independence.

Shortly after the reading concluded around 4:00 P.M., Japanese authorities entered the restaurant and arrested the signatories. Meanwhile, copies of the document were distributed throughout Pagoda Park to inform the assembled public that independence had been declared. The text specifically instructed citizens to avoid violent acts, warning that property damage or rioting would undermine the movement and contradict the explicit instructions of the leadership.

== Text ==
The following text is from the official transcript of the First Korean Congress held in Philadelphia in 1919:

We, the representatives of 20,000,000 united people of Korea, hereby proclaim the independence of Korea and the liberty of the Korean people. This Proclamation stands in witness to the equality of all nations, and we pass it on to our posterity as their inalienable right.

With 4,000 years of history behind us, we take this step to insure to our children forever life, liberty and pursuit of happiness in accord with the awakening consciousness of this new era. This is the clear leading of God and the right of every nation. Our desire for liberty cannot be crushed or destroyed.

After an independent civilization of several thousand years we have experienced the agony for fourteen years of foreign oppression, which has denied to us freedom of thought and made it impossible for us to share in the intelligent advance of the age in which we live.

To assure us and our children freedom from future oppression, and to be able to give full scope to our national aspirations, as well as to secure blessing and happiness for all time, we regard as the first imperative the regaining of our national independence.

We entertain no spirit of vengeance towards Japan, but our urgent need today is to redeem and rebuild our ruined nation, and not to discuss who has caused Korea's downfall.

Our part is to influence the Japanese Government, which is now dominated by the old idea of brute force, so that it will change and act in accordance with the principles of justice and truth.

The result of the enforced annexation of Korea by Japan is that every possible discrimination in education, commerce and other spheres of life has been practiced against us most cruelly. Unless remedied, the continued wrong will but intensify the resentment of the 20,000,000 Korean people and make the Far East a constant menace to the peace of the world.

We are conscious that Korea's independence will mean not only well being and happiness for our race, but also happiness and integrity for the 400,000,000 people of China and make Japan the leader of the Orient instead of the conqueror she is at the present time.

A new era awakes before our eyes, for the old world of force has gone and out of the travail of the past a new world of righteousness and truth has been born.

We desire a full measure of satisfaction in liberty and the pursuit of happiness. In this hope we go forward.

We pledge the following:

1. This work of ours is in behalf of truth, justice and life and is undertaken at the request of our people to make known their desire for liberty. Let there be no violence.

2. Let those who follow us show every hour with gladness this same spirit.

3. Let all things be done with singleness of purpose, so that our behavior to the end may be honorable and upright.

The 4252nd year of the Kingdom of Korea, 3rd month, 1st day.

Representatives of the people:

The signatures attached to the document are: Son Byung Hi, Kil Sun Chu, Yi Pil Chu, Pak Yun Song, Kim Won Kyu, Kim Pyung Cho, Kim Chang Chun, Kwan Dong Chin, Kwan Byung Duk, Na Yung Whan, Na Yum Hup, Yang Chun Paik, Yang Hun Mok, Yi Yo Dur, Yi Kop Sung, Yi Muin Yong, Yi Suing Hui, Yi Chon Hun, Yi Chon Il, Yim Yi Whan, Pak Chun Sang, Pak Hi Do, Pak Tong Won, Sim Hong Sik, Sim Sok Ku, Oh Sai Chung, Oh Wha Yun, Chun Chu Su, Che Song Mo, Che In, Hang Yong Yun, Hong Byun Ki, Ho Ki Cho.

== Legacy ==
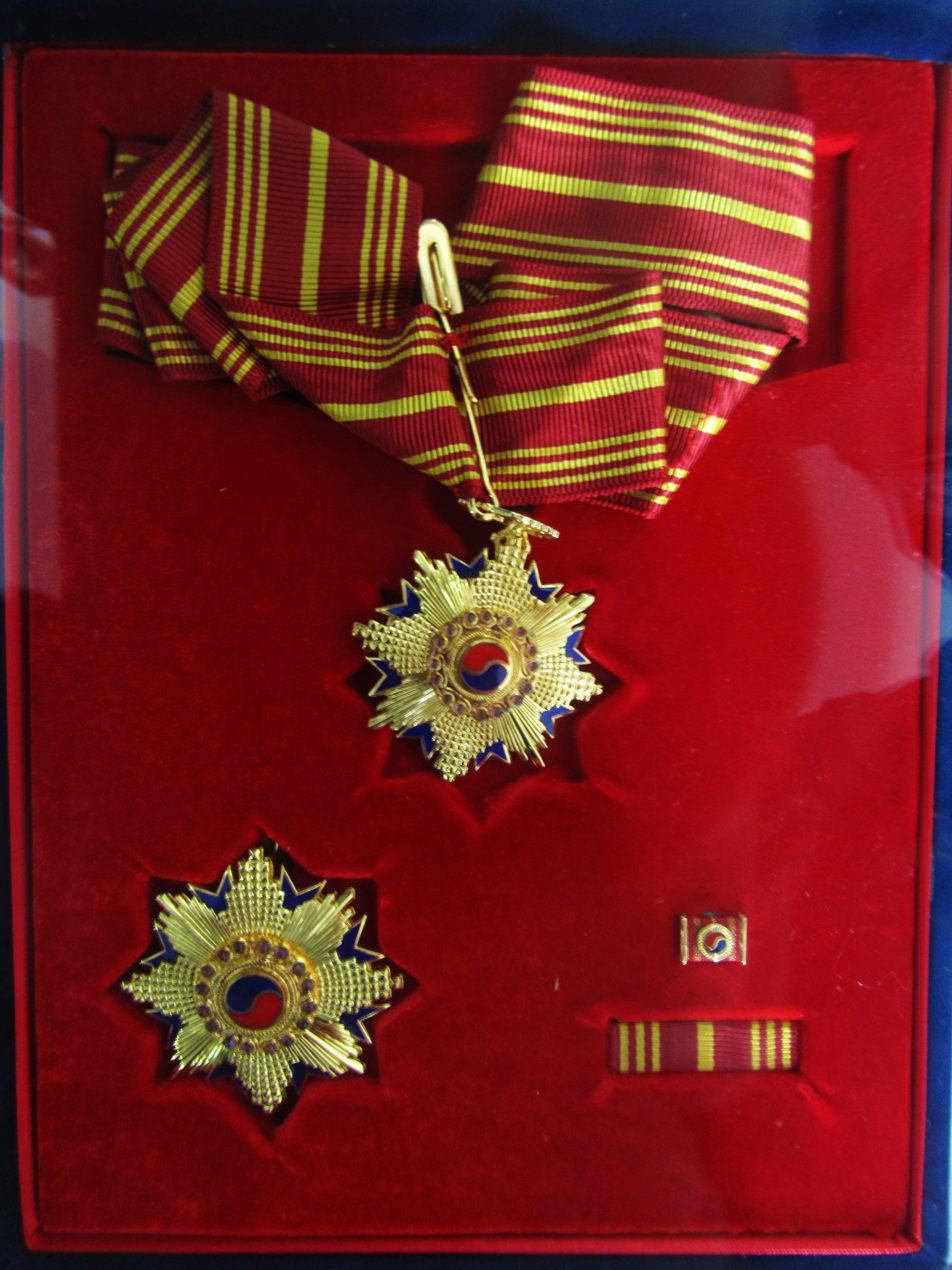
Independence medal awarded to Korean patriot Chu Fucheng

Following the restoration of sovereignty, the South Korean government established official decorations to recognize individuals who contributed to the independence movement. Conferred by the Ministry of Patriots and Veterans Affairs, these honors were awarded to many of the 33 signatories of the declaration.

The state recognition is divided into two primary classifications. The first honors individuals who died during or as a direct result of their active resistance against colonial rule, recognizing them as patriotic martyrs; this includes several signatories who died while enduring severe conditions in prison. The second classification recognizes surviving freedom fighters and activists as "persons of merit for national foundation."
