= Naksan =

Mountain in Seoul, South Korea

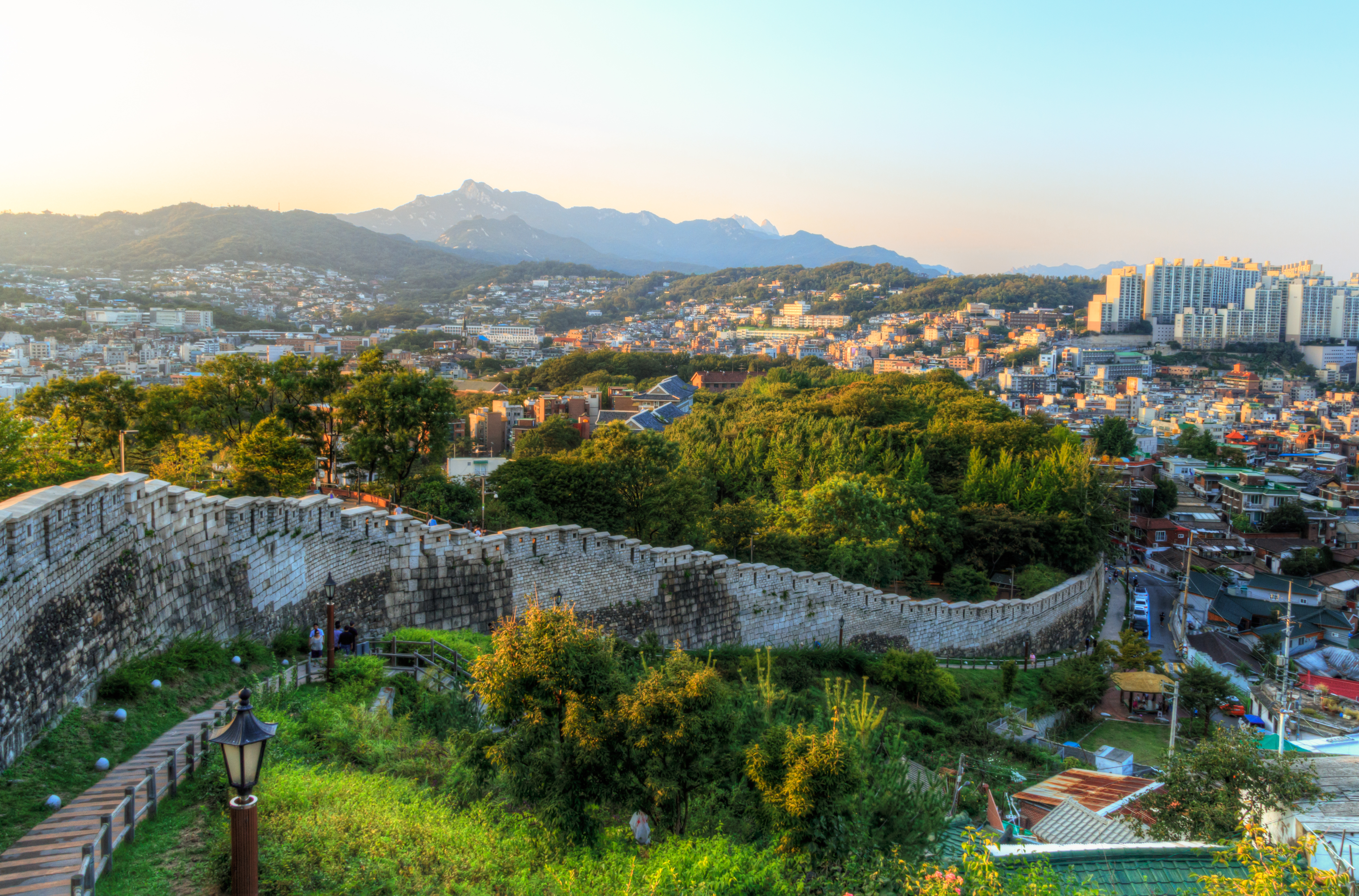
- View from the mountain of the Fortress Wall of Seoul (2016)

Highest point
- Elevation: 125 m (410 ft)
- Coordinates: 37°34′50″N 127°00′31″E

Geography
- Location: Jongno District, Seoul, South Korea

Korean name
- Hangul: 낙산
- Hanja: 駱山
- Lit.: camel mountain
- RR: Naksan
- MR: Naksan

Naksan (Korean: 낙산; lit. 'Camel Mountain') is a mountain in Jongno District, Seoul, South Korea. It is 125 metres (410 ft) tall. It and Namsan are well known for their panoramic views of downtown Seoul.

The mountain and its surrounding area is Naksan Park, which is a public park maintained by the city government since 2002. The park has been used as the filming location.

== History ==
Naksan derives its name from Naktasan (낙타산; 駱駝山) because the geography resembles a camel's back. As this place used to be a royal ranch that supplied milk for the palace, it was also known as Taraksan (타락산; 駝酪山).

Starting from the 1960s, public apartments and dense housing began encircling the area. In order to preserve the mountain's natural environment, the government of Seoul began a restoration plan and finally opened Naksan Park in July 2002.

== Places ==
=== Naksan Exhibition Hall ===
Located at the entrance of Naksan Park, this exhibition hall shows the origin and history of Naksan, as well as providing information to visitors, all free of charge.

=== Hongdeok Field ===
After the Qing invasion of Joseon, King Injo surrendered and sent two of his sons as hostage. Hongdeok (홍덕; 弘德), a court lady, accompanied them to Shenyang. There, she made kimchi for Crown Prince Bongrim, and he would fall in love with the taste.

He eventually ascended the throne as King Hyojong. On one occasion he tasted a plate of kimchi, and he immediately recognized the taste. Immediately, he summoned Hongdeok and offered her a generous reward, but she declined. The king later gave orders to grant her a few gyeong of land at the foot of Naksan as compensation. She turned the land into a cabbage farm, and continued to make kimchi; until today, it is being tended.

=== Fortress Wall of Seoul ===
A section of the 18.2 km-long fortress wall passes through Naksan. Starting from Hyehwamun and ending at Heunginjimun, the whole length is 2.1 km. A path was built alongside the wall, offering visitors a leisurely stroll while admiring the cityscape. The path would connect with other paths and lead to various viewpoints across the park, including Naksanjeong Pavilion (낙산정; 駱山亭), built in traditional Korean architecture.

=== Biudang ===
This humble thatched-roof house is the former residence of Yu Gwan (유관; 柳寬, 1346–1433), a prime minister in the early Joseon period, who was known for his honesty and integrity. Despite holding a high and influential position, Yu lived a destitute life; whenever it rained, he would sit in a room where rainwater is leaking, and hold an umbrella. There, he would think of the people who cannot afford an umbrella during this time.

Later, the house was passed down to Yi Sugwang, a famous scholar, who upon hearing the story of Yu, named it Biudang (비우당; 庇雨堂), meaning "a house to take shelter from the rain". This was where he would write the encyclopedia Jibongyuseol, contributing greatly to the Silhak movement.

=== Jajudong Spring ===
After King Sejo usurped the throne, King Danjong was exiled to Yeongwol in Gangwon Province while his wife, Queen Jeongsun, was stripped of her title and booted from the palace. To make ends meet, she resorted to helping the palace maid in the dyeing business. This spring is where she would dye white cloths into purple, the color of royalty and nobility, thus it received the name Jajidongcheon (자지동천; 紫芝洞泉), which would evolve into Jajudong.

== Gallery ==
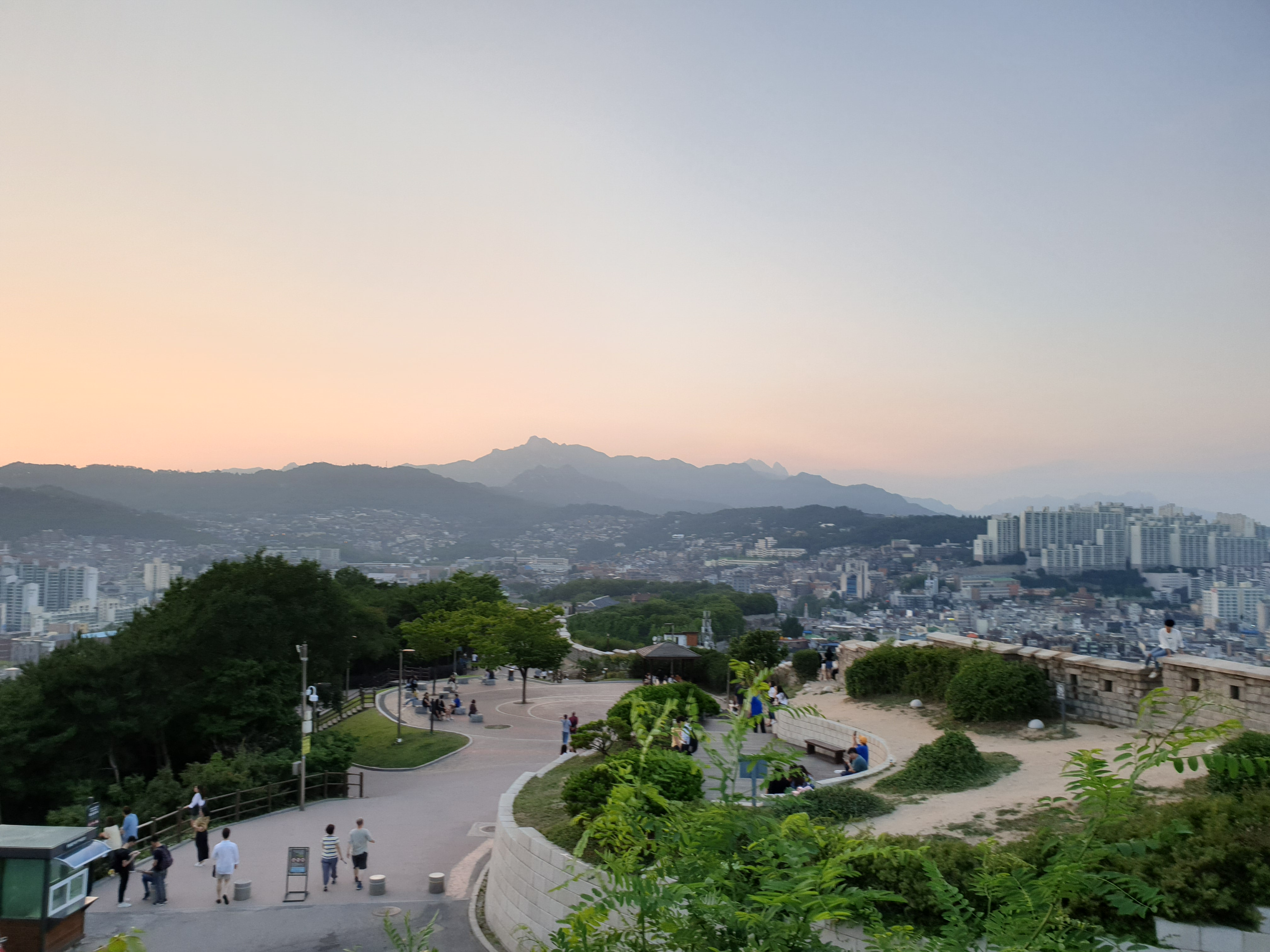
Naksan Park (2019)

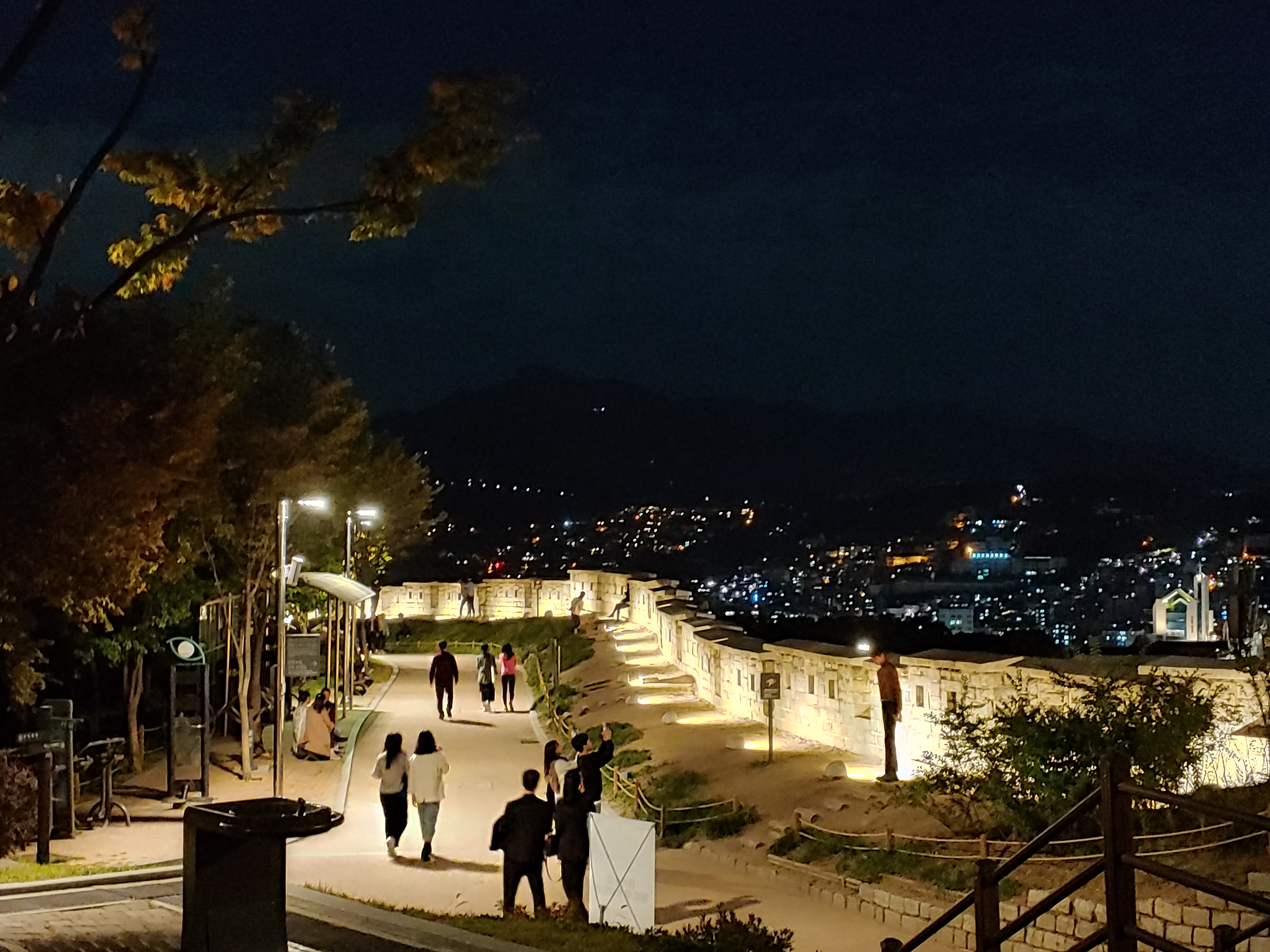
Night view (2019)

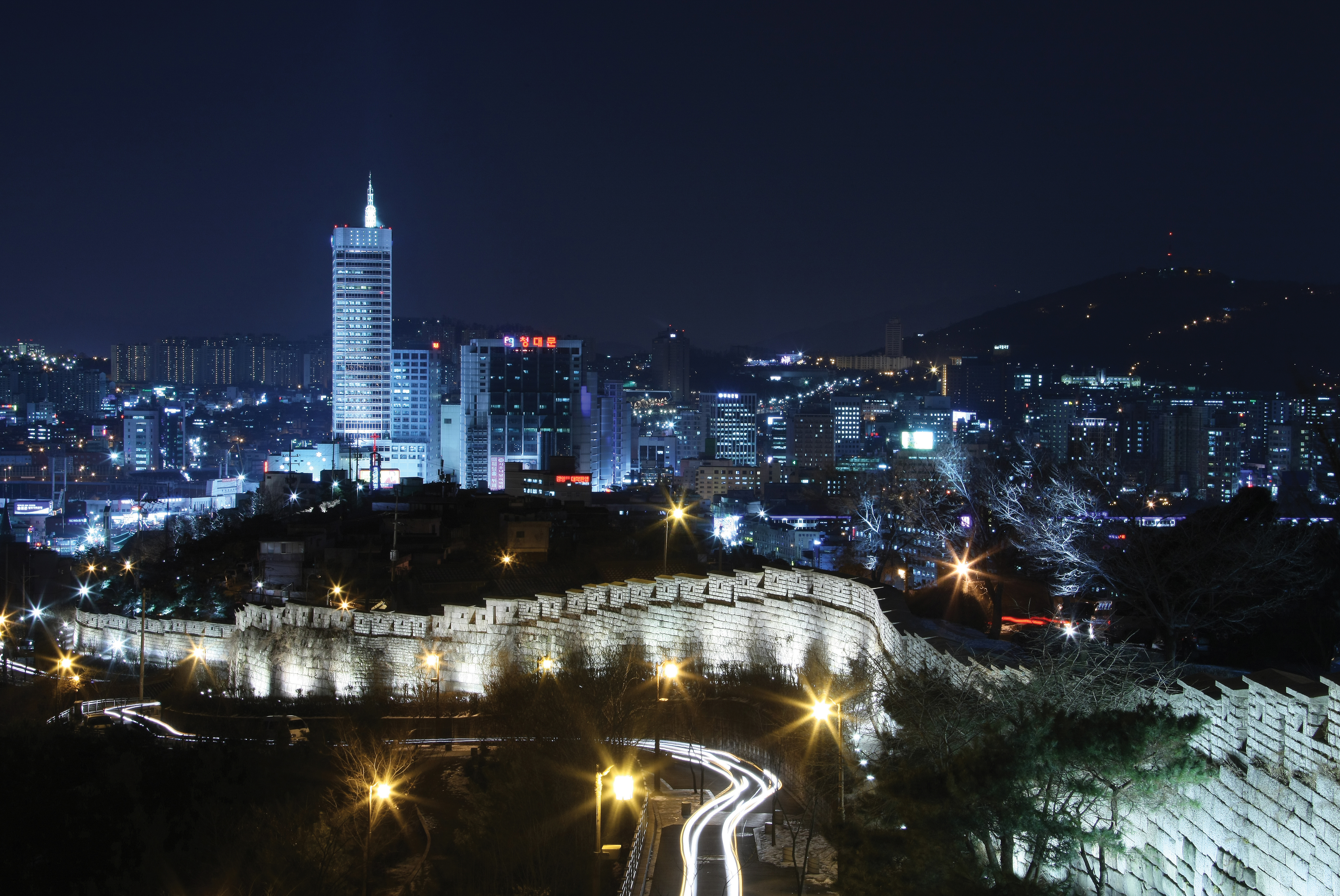
Fortress wall along the mountain (2011)

== See also ==
- List of mountains in Korea
- List of parks in Seoul
