= Yeongdeungpo Park =

Park in Seoul, South Korea

Coordinates: 37°30′55″N 126°54′39″E

- Interactive map of Yeongdeungpo Park
- Location: 275 Sangilno, Yeongdeungpo District, Seoul, South Korea
- Area: 6.1544 hectares (15.208 acres)
- Opened: July 8, 1998
- Website: Website (in Korean)

Yeongdeungpo Park (Korean: 영등포공원) is a park in Yeongdeungpo-dong, Yeongdeungpo District, Seoul, South Korea. The park first opened to the public on July 8, 1998.

From 1933 to 1997, the area used to be host to an Oriental Brewery (OB) factory. After the factory moved to Icheon in 1997, the Seoul City Government bought the land and converted it into a park. Some residents still call it the "OB Park" because of this.

The park is host to a number of facilities, including a musical fountain, a pergola, a pond, a stream, basketball courts, and badminton courts. It has a parking lot and public restrooms.
