= Nakdong River Victory Memorial Hall =

Museum in Apsan Park, Daegu, South Korea

Nakdong River Victory Memorial Hall, also known as Nakdong River Battle Museum, is a small museum built inside the Apsan Park to commemorate the soldiers and civilians killed during the Korean War at a battle that raged near the Nakdong River. The grounds around the museum are scattered with vintage tanks and airplanes from the Korean War. Built in 1979, the museum has two floors, with exhibits from the Korean War and other significant eras in Korea's past. Other areas within the museum pay tribute to those that died in both natural and man-made disasters in Korea's past.

== See also ==
- Battle of Naktong Bulge
- Environment of South Korea
- Nakdong River
