= Dosan Park =

Park in Seoul, South Korea

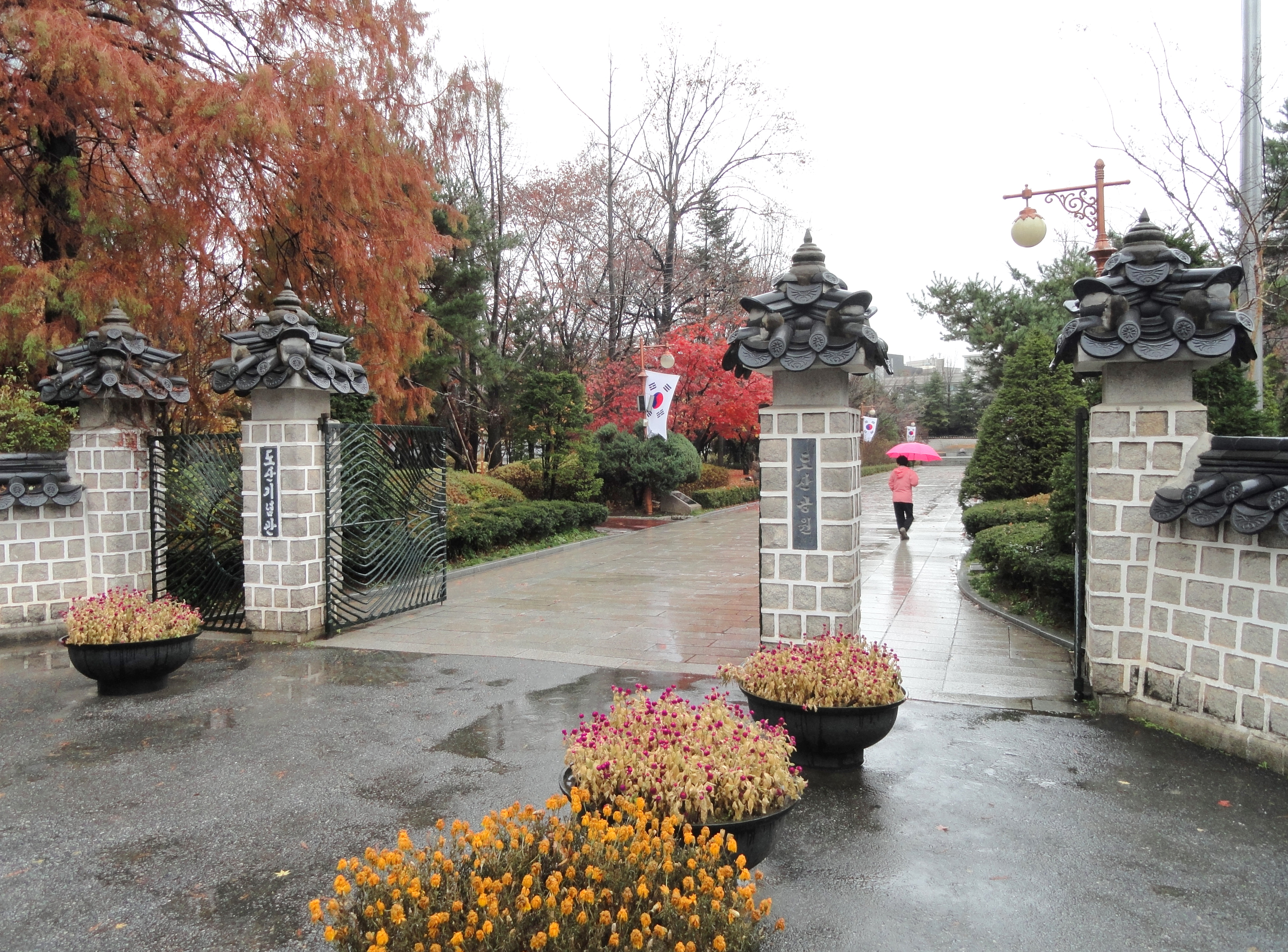
- Entrance to the park (2011)
- Interactive map of Dosan Park
- Location: Sinsa-dong, Gangnam, Seoul, South Korea

Korean name
- Hangul: 도산공원
- Hanja: 島山公園
- RR: Dosan gongwon
- MR: Tosan kongwŏn

Dosan Park (Korean: 도산공원) is a park in the neighborhood of Sinsa-dong, Gangnam, Seoul, South Korea. It was established in 1973 to commemorate An Changho, a Korean independence activist whose art name was Dosan. Inside the park is the Dosan Ahn Chang-ho Memorial Hall to commemorate him as well.

== Gallery ==
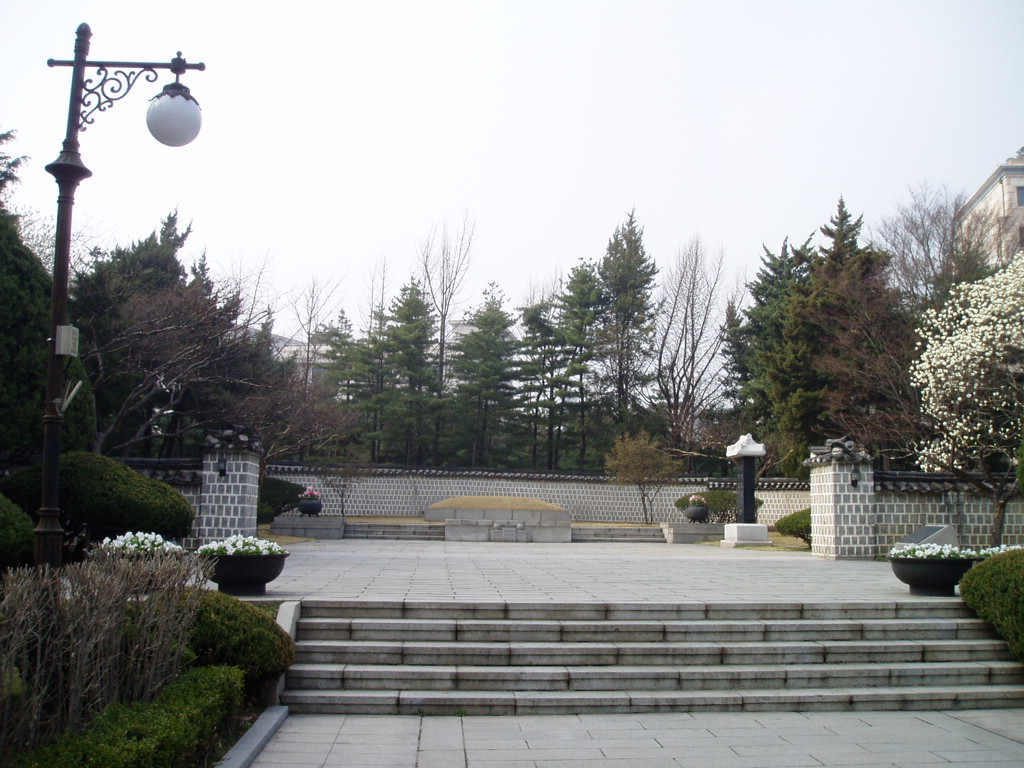

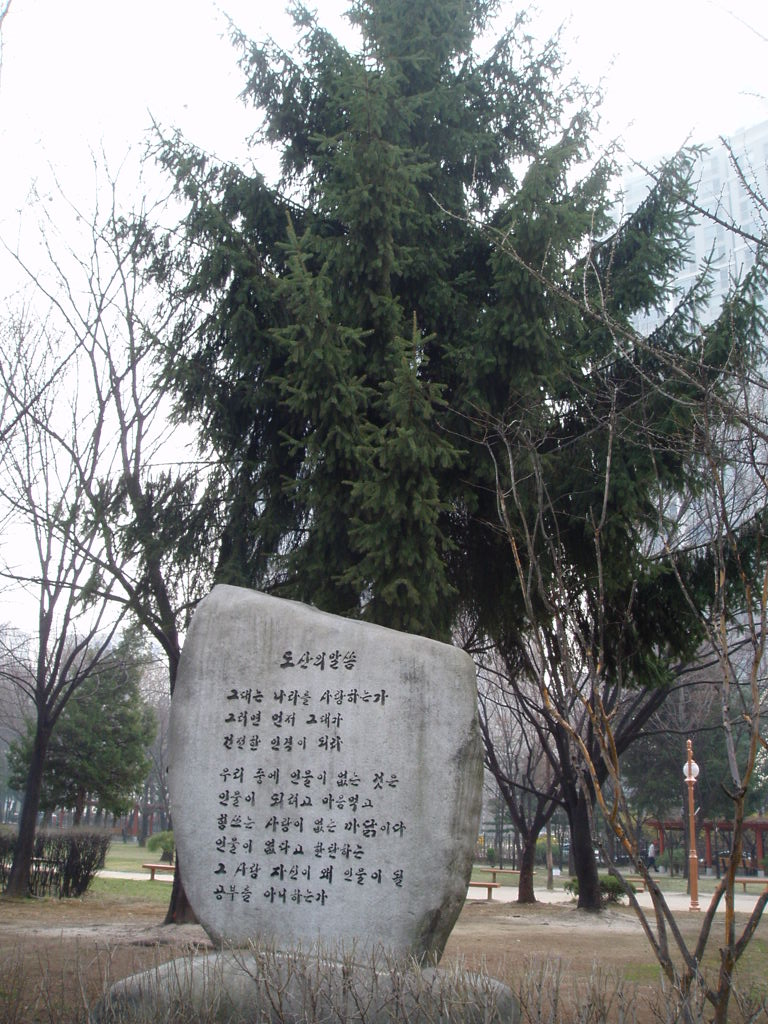

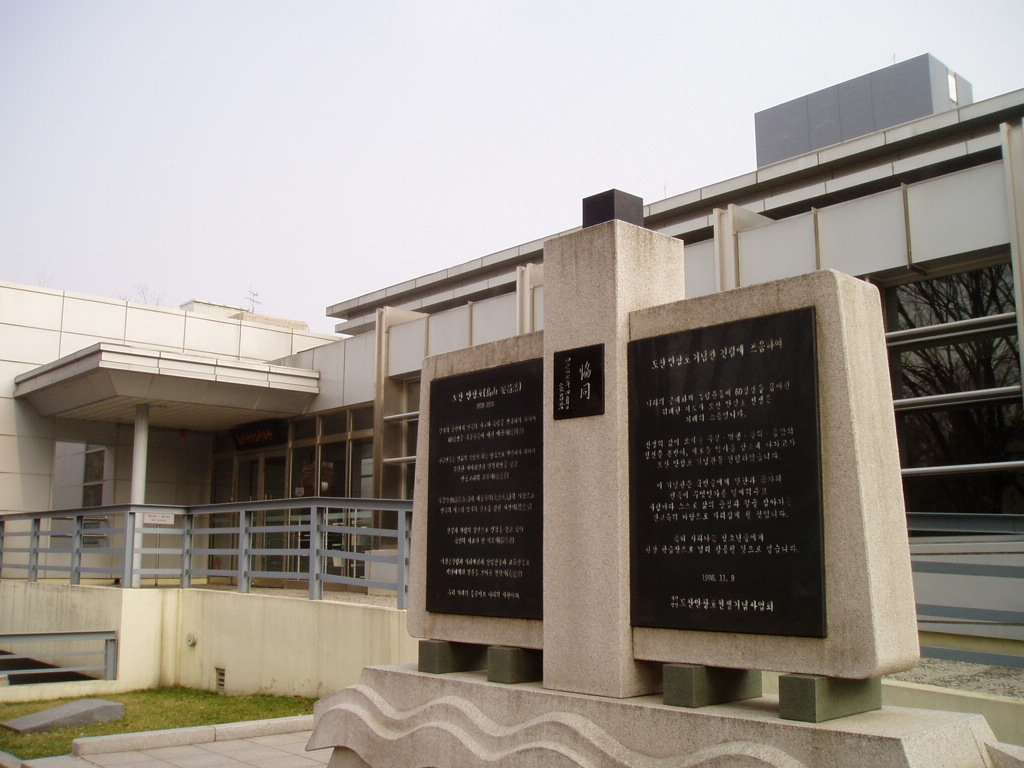

== Transportation ==
Apgujeong Station, Apgujeongrodeo Station

== Other information ==
The Dosan Ahn Chang-ho Memorial Hall is closed on Sundays, as well as during the Lunar New Year, Chuseok, and Christmas holidays. It is open daily from 10:00 AM to 6:00 PM.

== See also ==
- List of parks in Seoul
- Kim Koo Museum
