= Hwawon Park =

Park in Daegu, South Korea

- Hangul: 화원유원지
- Hanja: 花園遊園地
- RR: Hwawon yuwonji
- MR: Hwawŏn yuwŏnji

Hwawon Park (Korean: 화원유원지) is a park located in Daegu Dalseong-gun, South Korea. It opened on 10 March 1981 and is mainly used by children. It is 4,544 square metres (1.123 acres) in size.
