= Herb Hillz =

Park in Daegu, South Korea

Coordinates: 35°52′17″N 128°36′5″E

Naengcheon Nature Land is a park located in Daegu Dalseong-gun, South Korea.

Established in March 1976 as 'Naengcheon Nature Won', it was renamed 'Naengcheon Nature Land' in March 1993.

In June 2005, it was renamed again to Herb Hillz (허브힐즈).

== Description ==
Herb Hillz is a herb-and-flower-packed park that also hosts a variety of events and attractions, which change with the seasons. The park covers some 10,000 m^{2}, and includes a large stand of metasequoia trees. It features the only green tea field in the Yeongnam area, known as the "Kim Taehee Green Tea Garden."

Rides and attractions include bumper cars, a swinging ship, a family-oriented zoo, and quaint shops. It offers sledding in the winter, flowering herbs in the spring, and water activities in the warm season, as well as year-round craft activities. An Eco-adventure area includes a climbing wall and ziplines.
