= Mullae-dong =

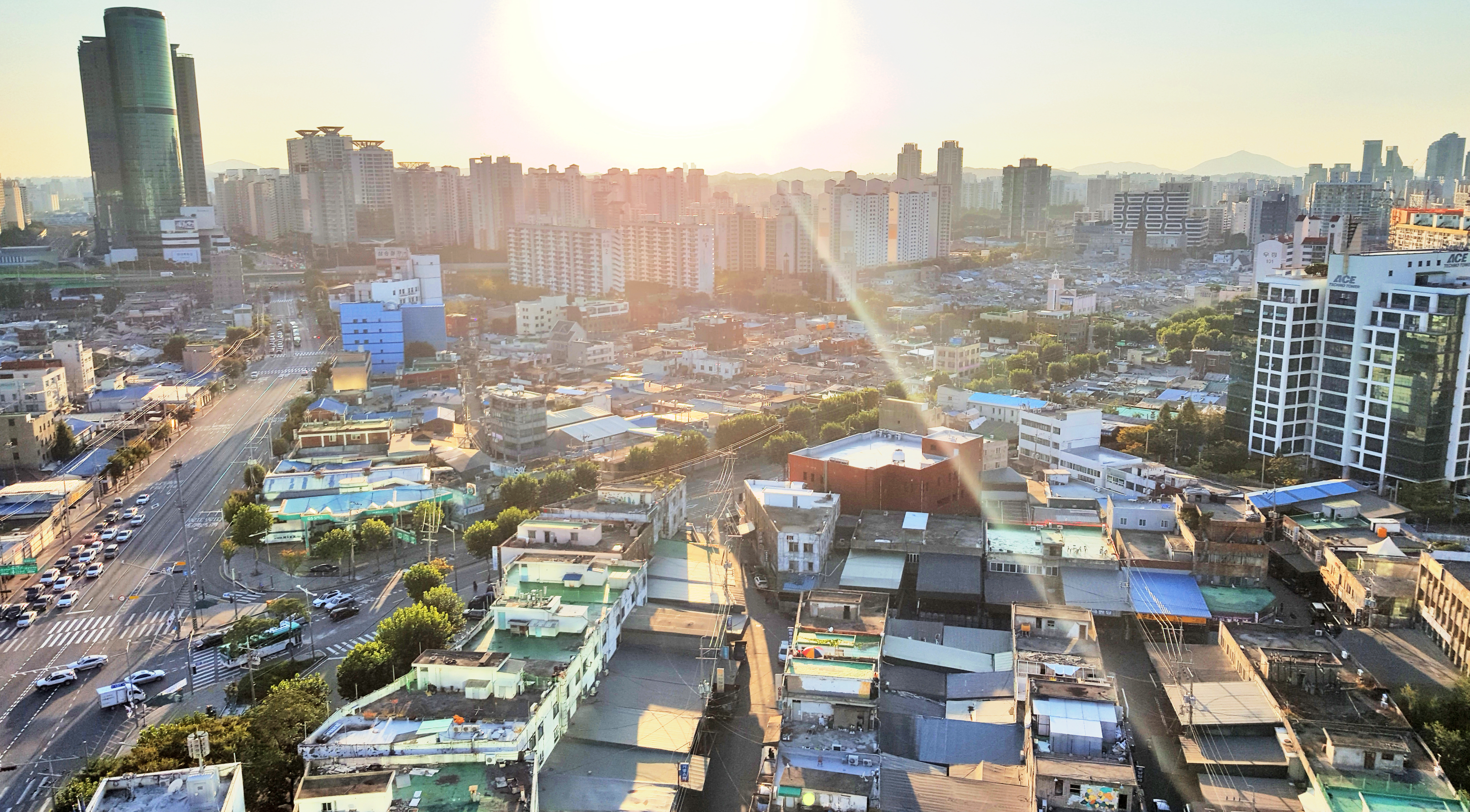
- Interactive map of Mullae-dong
- Country: South Korea

Area
  - Total: 1.49 km^{2} (0.58 sq mi)

Population (December 2012)
  - Total: 32,758
  - Estimate (June 2021): 32,870
  - Density: 22,000/km^{2} (56,900/sq mi)
- Website: https://www.ydp.go.kr/english/index.do

Korean name
- Hangul: 문래동
- Hanja: 文來洞
- RR: Mullae-dong
- MR: Mullae-dong

Mullae-dong (Korean: 문래동) is a dong (neighborhood) of Yeongdeungpo District, Seoul, South Korea. The name "Mullae" comes from the neighborhood's old name, "Moraet-mal (모랫말)," which means "Sandy Village" in Korean.

The neighborhood is most well known for its industrial factories. Because the neighborhood is one the least gentrified areas of Seoul a lot of factories— that manufacture a variety of goods from textile to steel— are present in the area. In fact, there is a street nicknamed "steel factory street" (철공소 거리) due to the abundancy of Metal fabrication factories.

Mullae-dong is also known for art. Numerous art studios in which art exhibitions are sporadically conducted, as well as metal sculptures and commercial graffiti, can be found around the neighborhood. The neighborhood contains Mullae Park, which was once a military base until the 1980s.

The population, as of 2021, is estimated to be 32,870.

== Gallery ==
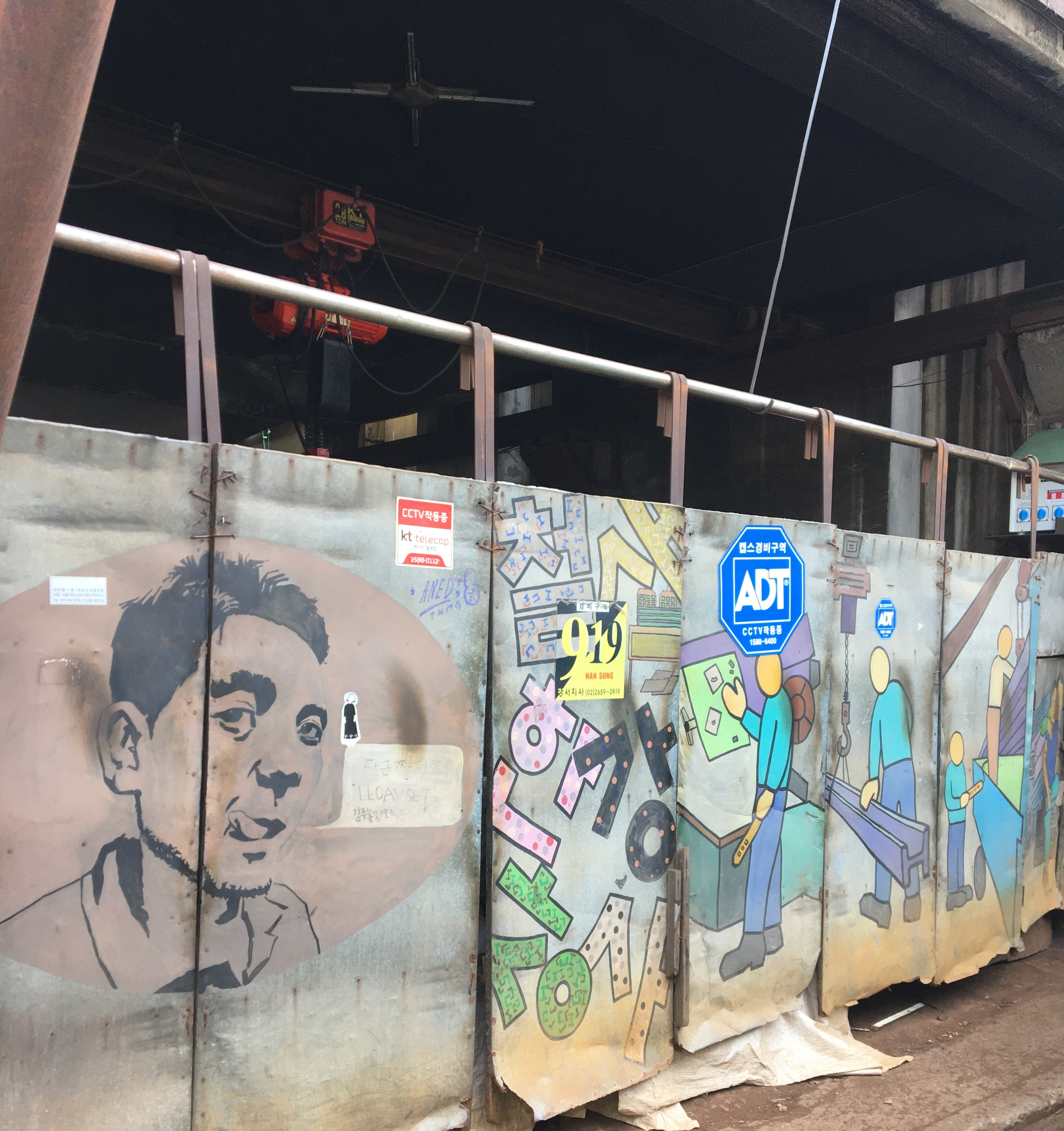
Mullae-dong Factory District

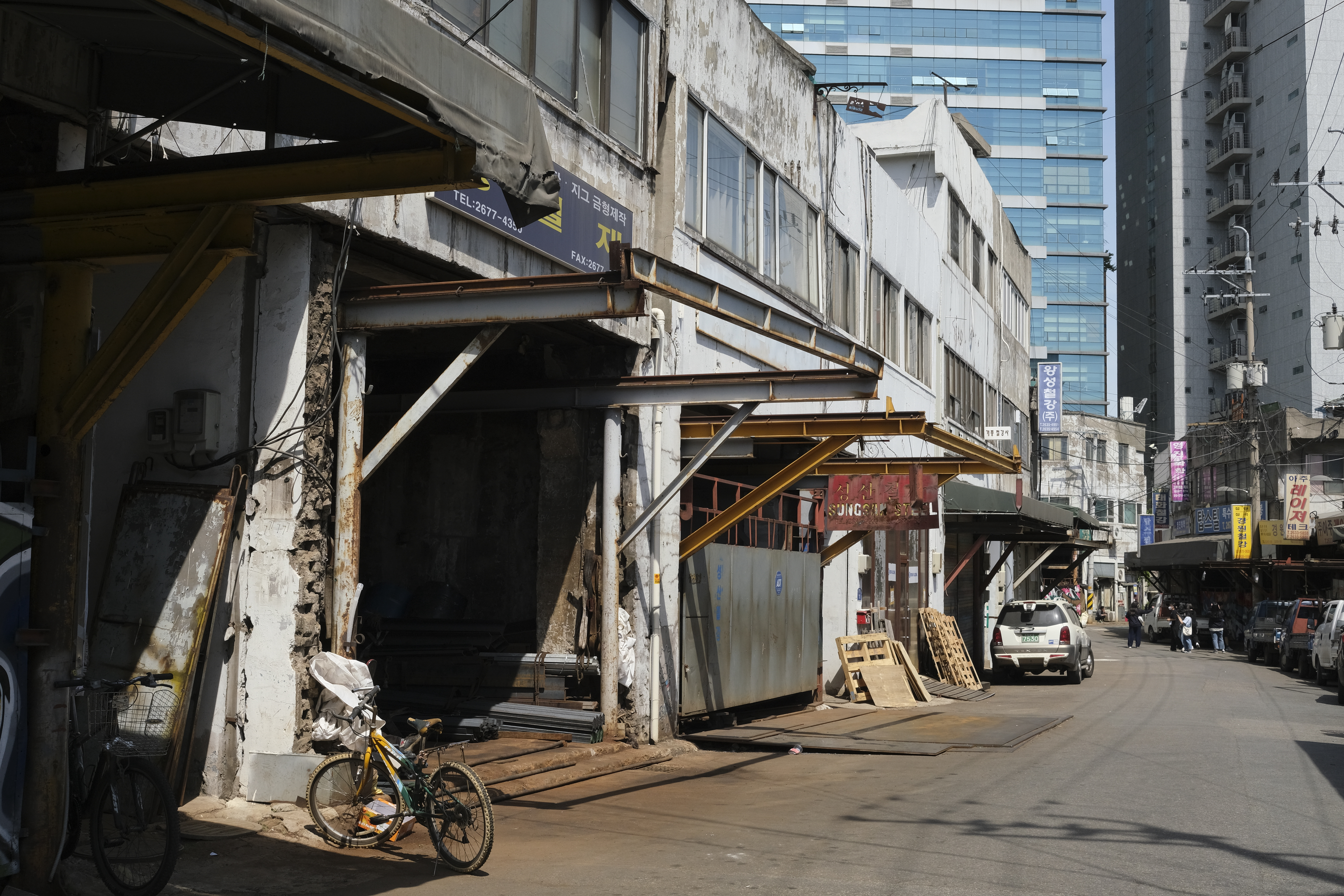
Mullae-dong Ironworks

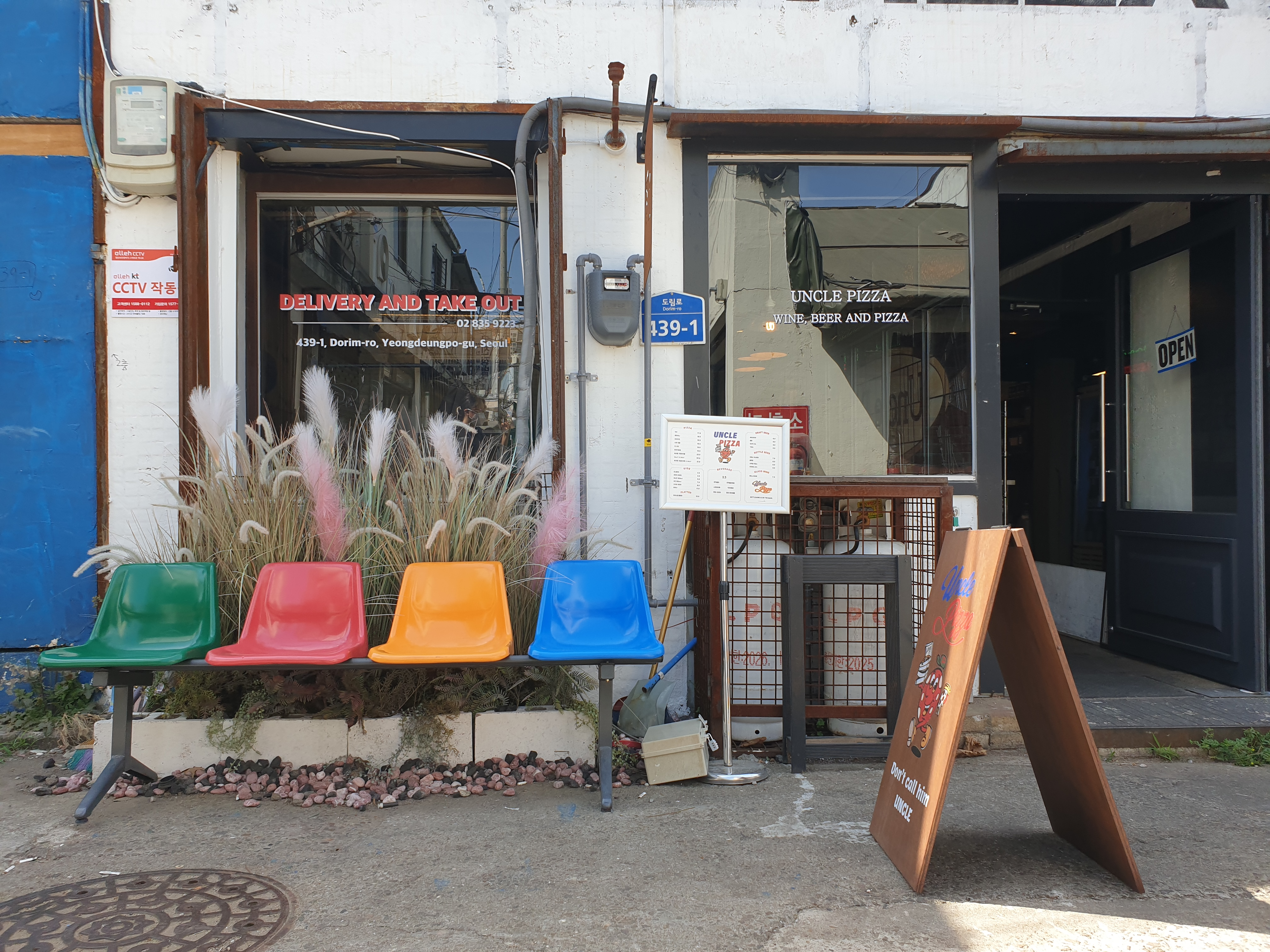
Mullae-dong restaurant

== See also ==
- Administrative divisions of South Korea
