= Gamsammot Park =

Park in Daegu, South Korea

Coordinates: 35.858655°N 128.552225°E

- Interactive map of Gamsammot Park
- Area: 1.6332 ha (4.04 acres)

Korean name
- Hangul: 감삼못공원
- Hanja: 甘三못公園
- RR: Gamsammot gongwon
- MR: Kamsammot kongwŏn

Gamsammot Park (Korean: 감삼못공원) is a park located in Daegu Seo-gu, South Korea. There was Gamsam-mot (lake). The park was renamed from Gamsam Park to Gamsammot Park in November 2010. It has a comparatively small area, at 16,332 m^{2}. Nearby places of interest include Dalseong High School, Gyungun Middle School and Duryu Park. It is close to the Duryu Station of Daegu Subway Line 2.
