= Gyeongsang-gamyeong Park =

Park located in Jung District, Daegu, South Korea

Coordinates: 35.872199°N 128.592379°E

- Hangul: 경상감영공원
- Hanja: 慶尙監營公園
- Revised Romanization: Gyeongsang gamyeong gongwon
- McCune–Reischauer: Kyŏngsang kamyŏng kongwŏn

Gyeongsang Gamyeong Park (Korean: 경상감영공원) is a park in Jung District, Daegu, South Korea. The park is located at the site of the Gyeongsang Gamyeong during the reign of King Seonjo of the Joseon Dynasty, and was created to preserve the site. From 1910 to 1965, the North Gyeongsang government office was located here. After the office was moved, the park was established in 1970. Due to its location in the center of Daegu, it was called Jung-ang Gong-won (중앙공원; lit. central park), but in 1997 was renamed to Gyeongsang Gamyeong Park.

Inside the park, two buildings remain: the Seonhwadang (Korean: 선화당; Hanja: 宣化堂), where the governor of Gyeongsang Gamyeong worked, and the Jingcheonggak (진청각; 澄淸閣), which was the governor's residence. In addition, there is a main gate that preserves the old building style, a fountain, a stone wall, a cobblestone promenade, and a Bell of Unification, symbolizing prayers for the reunification of the country.
