= Apsan Park =

Park in Daegu, South Korea

Coordinates: 35.820°N 128.579°E

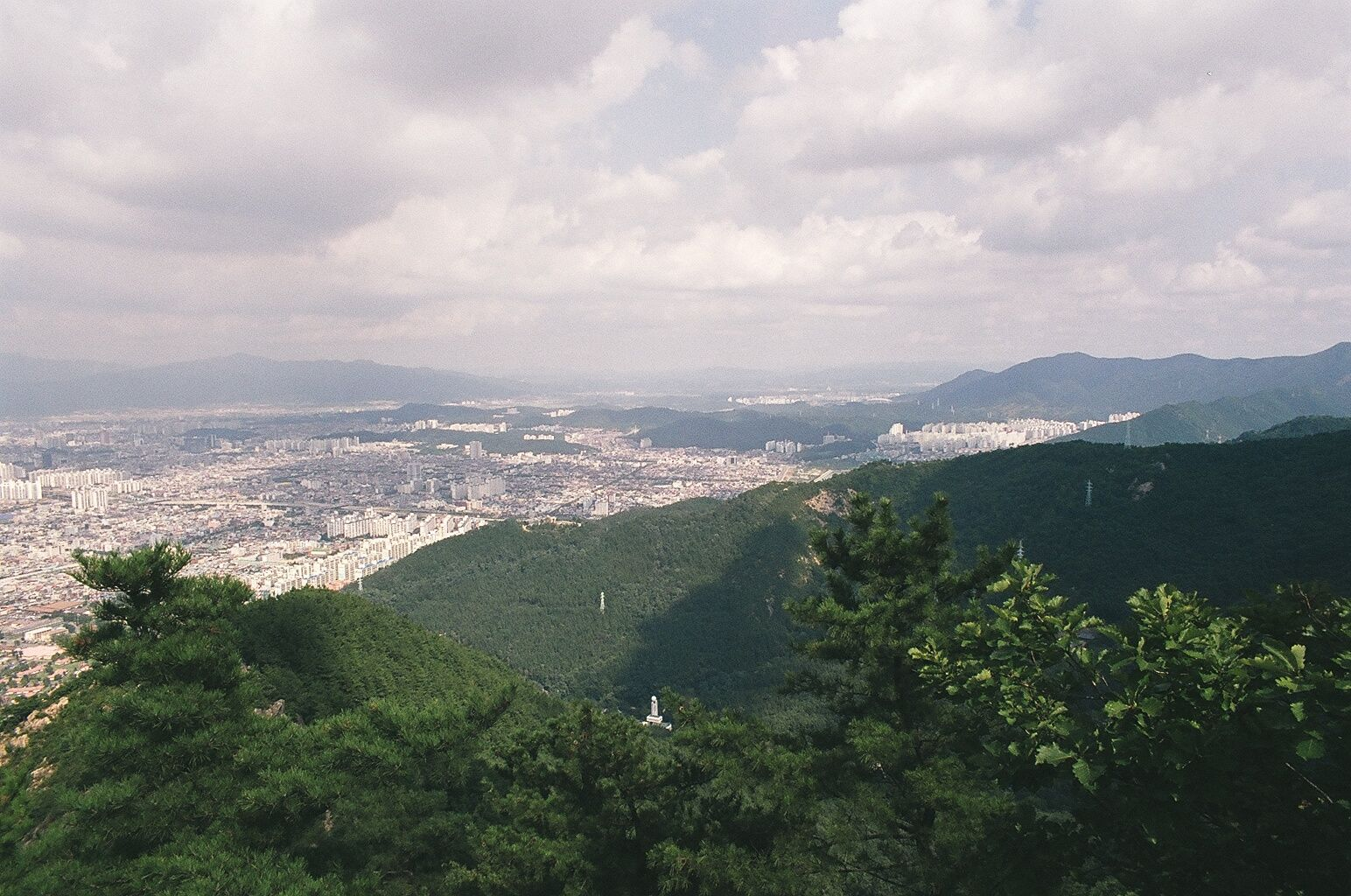
- View of south-western Daegu from Apsan Park, including some of the hills that line the southern edge of the city.

Korean name
- Hangul: 앞산공원
- Hanja: 앞山公園
- RR: Apsan gongwon
- MR: Apsan kongwŏn

Apsan Park (Korean: 앞산공원) is a large wilderness park located in the south of Daegu, South Korea. It covers a series of valleys and peaks of Apsan mountain.

Inside the park is a museum dedicated to the Korean War, the Nakdong River Battle Museum. The museum also contains an anti-communism hall. Nearby is a small amusement park and restaurants. A gondola leads to one of the peaks, and a series of trails also lead to the various peaks.

Ansil-sa and a couple of other Buddhist temples are located within the park.

The area of Apsan park is 1.653 km^{2}.

== See also ==
- Environment of South Korea
