= Haksan Park =

Park in South Korea

- Interactive map of Haksan Park
- Coordinates: 35.830°N 128.539°E

Korean name
- Hangul: 학산공원
- Hanja: 鶴山公園
- RR: Haksan gongwon
- MR: Haksan kongwŏn

Haksan Park (Korean: 학산공원) is a park that is located in Dalseo District, Daegu, South Korea. The area of that is 660,000 m^{2}. Another name of Haksan park is Bolli. The park is equipped with facilities such as a multipurpose playground, an arboretum, a pond, a path up a mountain, a boardwalk, a parking lot etc.
