= Boramae Park =

Park in Seoul, South Korea

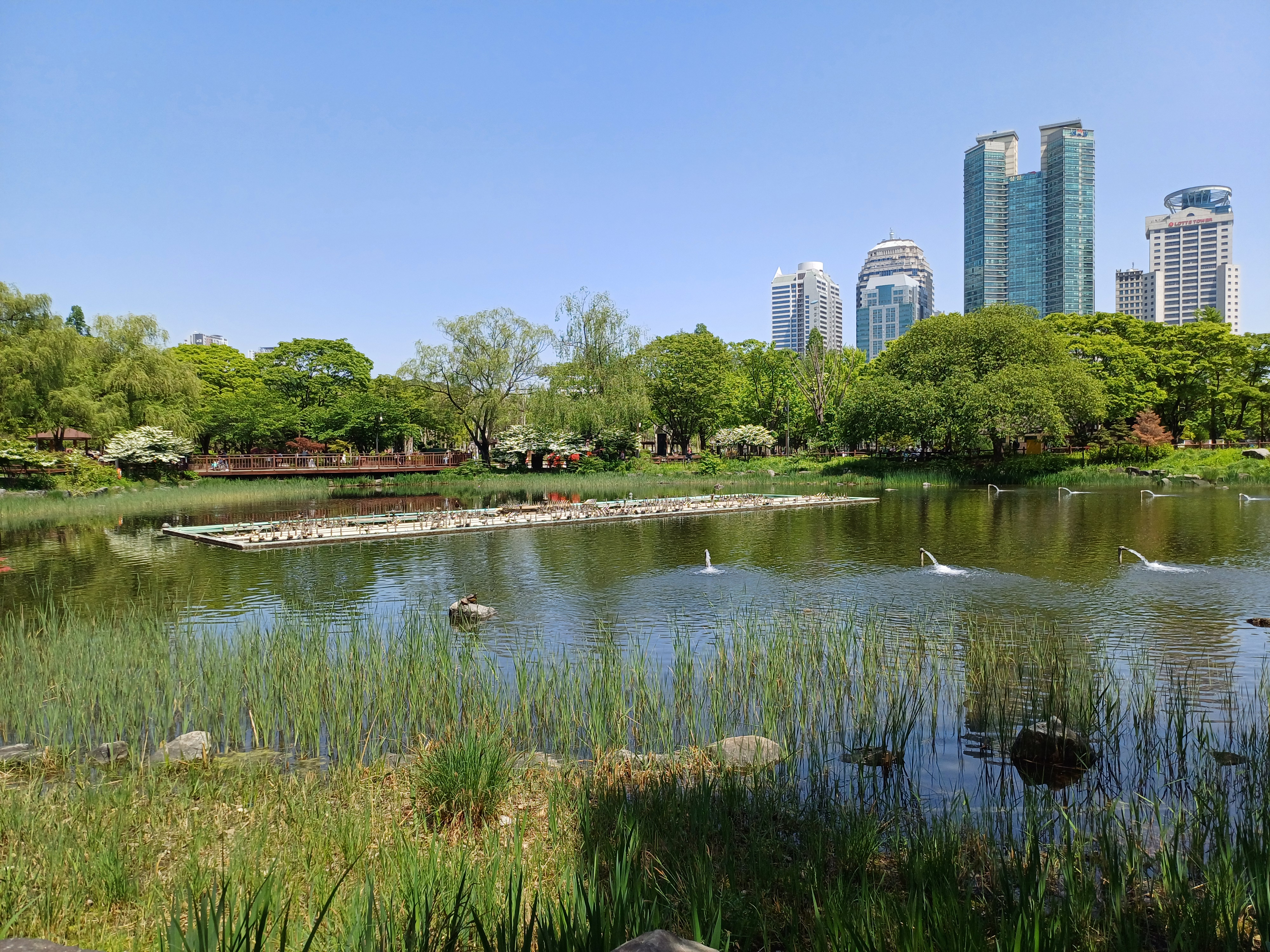
- The pond in the park (2024)
- Interactive map of Boramae Park
- Location: Sindaebang-dong, Dongjak District, Seoul, South Korea
- Coordinates: 37.4919°N 126.9197°E
- Established: May 5, 1987
- Etymology: Emblem of the Korea Air Force Academy

Korean name
- Hangul: 보라매공원
- Hanja: 보라매公園
- Lit.: juvenile Eurasian goshawk park
- RR: Boramae gongwon
- MR: Poramae kongwŏn

Boramae Park (Korean: 보라매공원) is a large public park in Sindaebang-dong, Dongjak District, Seoul, South Korea.

== Description ==
From 1958 to December 10, 1985, the area hosted the Korea Air Force Academy (KAFA). When the KAFA moved to Cheongju, the Seoul Metropolitan Government acquired the former site in December 1985, and turned the area into a public park. The park opened to the public on May 5, 1986. The park is named "Boramae", meaning juvenile Eurasian goshawk, after the name of a symbol used by the KAFA.

The park has an area of 413,352 m^{2} (4,449,280 ft^{2}). It has a variety of facilities, including a playground, tennis courts, an artificial turf soccer field, badminton courts, a jogging track, a gateball court, and a rock climbing wall. There are spaces for picnics, a floor fountain, community centers, and a small zoo. A dog park opened in the park on April 23, 2016. A children's park opened on June 6, 2024. The park also has a pond.

The park has an Air Park that displays eight airplanes in homage to its time as the KAFA, as well as a monument called Seongmudae (성무대; 星武臺). The monument was built in 1962, using donations from former cadets.
