= Otgol Village =

Clan village in Daegu, South Korea

Otgol Village (Korean: 옻골마을) is the clan village of the Gyeongju Choi located east of Daegu, South Korea.

Otgol consists of approximately 20 houses in the common Joseon period style; most are not original and those that are, have been heavily rebuilt over time. There are two 100-year-old locust trees standing at the entrance to the village.
