= Tapgol Park =

Public park in Seoul, South Korea

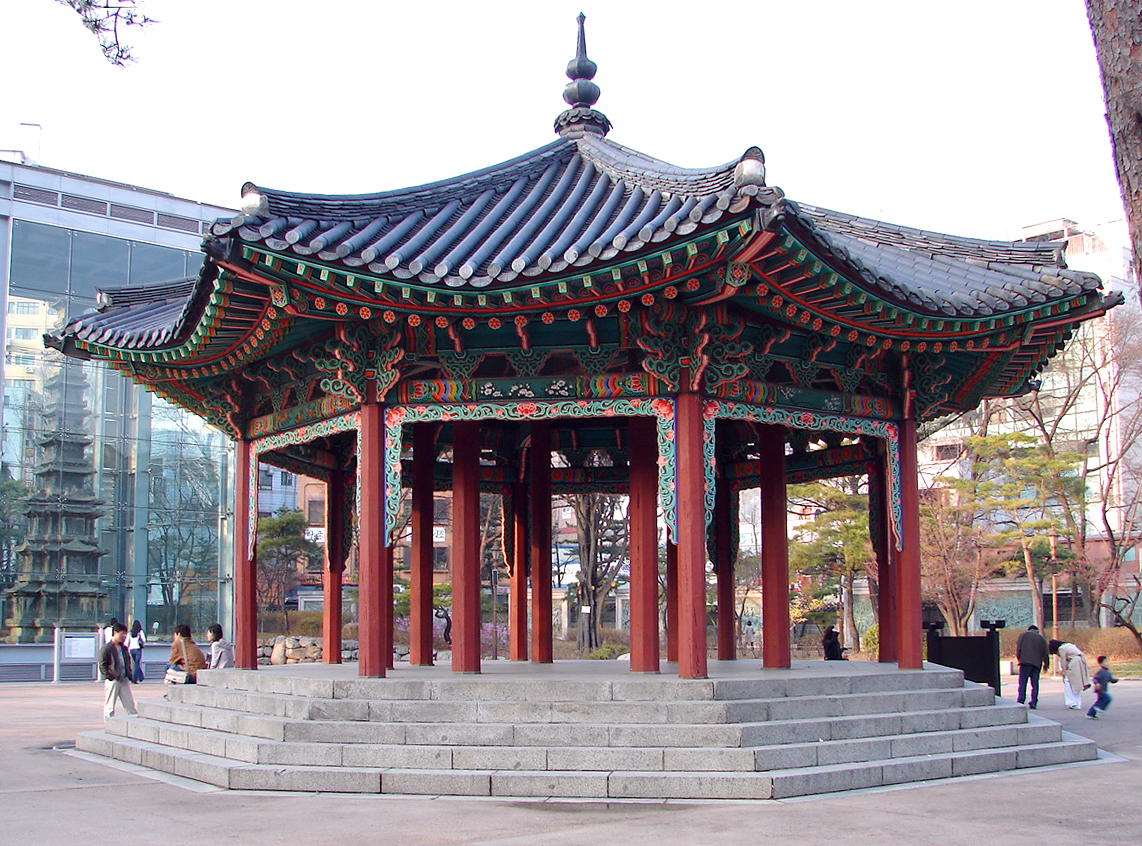
- The pavilion in the center of Tapgol Park in downtown Seoul
- Interactive map of Tapgol Park
- Location: 99 Jongno, Jongno District, Seoul, South Korea
- Coordinates: 37°34′16.00″N 126°59′18.56″E
- Area: 15.056 hectares (37.20 acres)

Historic Sites of South Korea
- Designated: 1991-10-25
- Reference no.: 354

Korean name
- Hangul: 탑골 공원
- Hanja: 塔골公園
- RR: Tapgol gongwon
- MR: T'apkol kongwŏn

Tapgol Park (Korean: 탑골 공원), formerly Pagoda Park, is a public park located at 99 Jongno, Jongno District, Seoul, South Korea. It is 1.50561 ha (3.7204 acres) in area. The park was previously known as Pagoda Park until May 28, 1992.

It is served by Jongno 3-ga Station on Lines 1, 3 and 5 of the Seoul Subway.

== Description ==
This park was once the site of the 15th-century Buddhist temple Wongaksa. The word tap means "pagoda", and the park gets its name from the Wongaksa Pagoda, a 10 storied stone pagoda (National Treasure No.2) located in the park. It did not become a park until 1897, when it was organized as a garden via the proposal of John McLeavy Brown, an Irish advisor to King Gojong.

One of the monuments in the park is the Monument of Wongaksa built in 1471 to record the founding of Wongaksa (temple) in 1465. On the front is an inscription composed by Kim Suon with the calligraphy done by Seong Im. On the back is found an inscription composed by Seo Geo Jeong with the calligraphy done by Jeong Nam Jong. The turtle shaped base is constructed from granite and the body is cut from marble. The monument measures 1.3 meters/4.3 feet wide and stands 4.9 meters/16.2 feet in height. Two elaborately carved intertwined dragons rising toward the sky holding a Buddhist gem reside on the top of the monument.

Tapgol Park is historically important as the site of the origin of the March First Movement 1919, an important part of the Korean independence movement as the first location for the reading of the Proclamation of Independence. There are a number of bas-relief statues representing Korean national heroes, as well as a monument to independence movement.

Appearance in K -Drama

The park is also briefly featured in Squid Game Season 2 episode 1 “Bread and Lottery.” In the scene, the recruiter passes out lottery tickets and bread to the homeless there before stamping down the remaining bread. This contrasts the ideals of the Proclamation of Independence against the lived reality of modern day Korea.

== Gallery ==
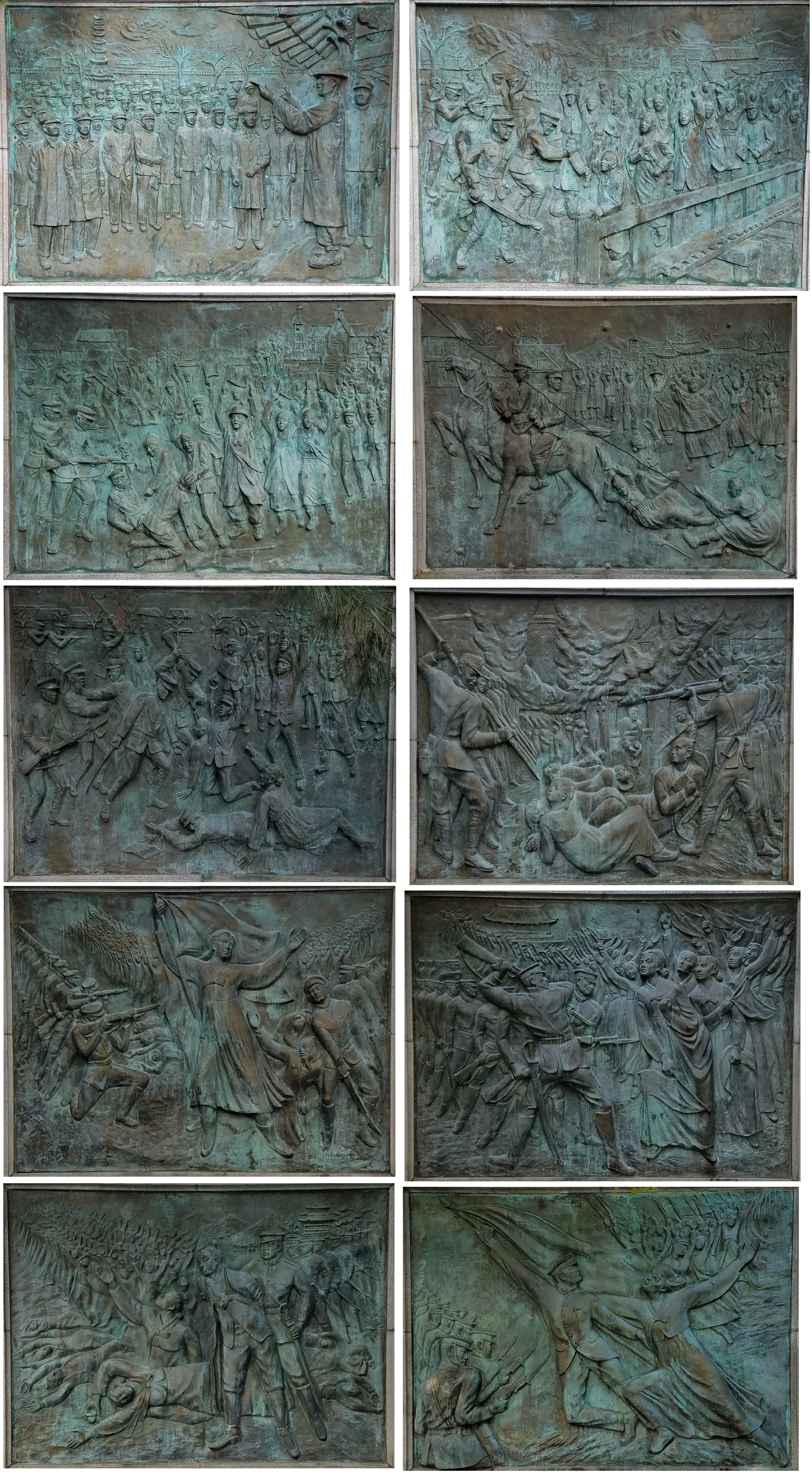
Ten bas-relief to commemorate March 1, 1919 Independence Movement

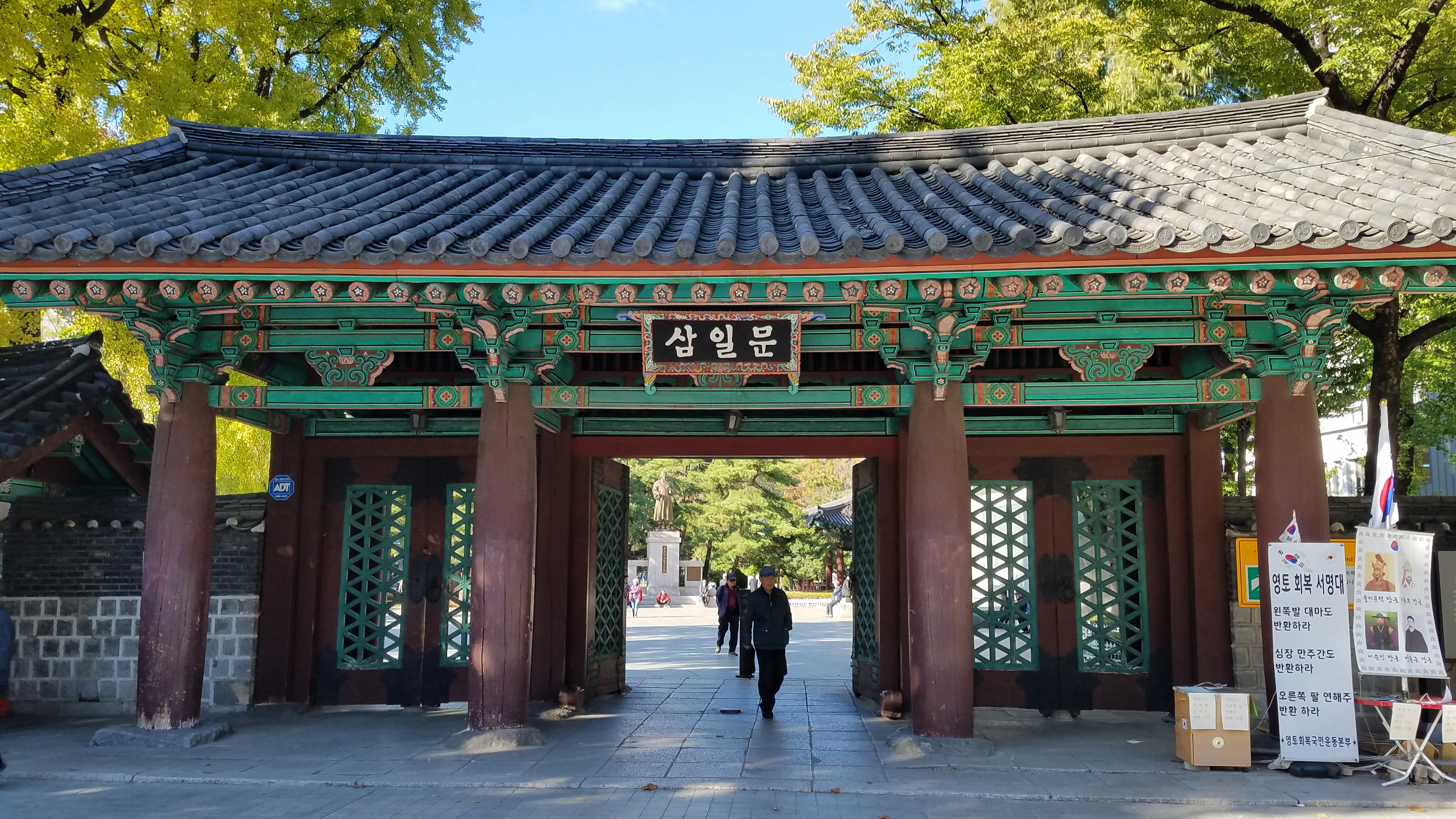
Entrance, center writing says "3 1 Door" where "3 1" refers to the 1919 March First Movement

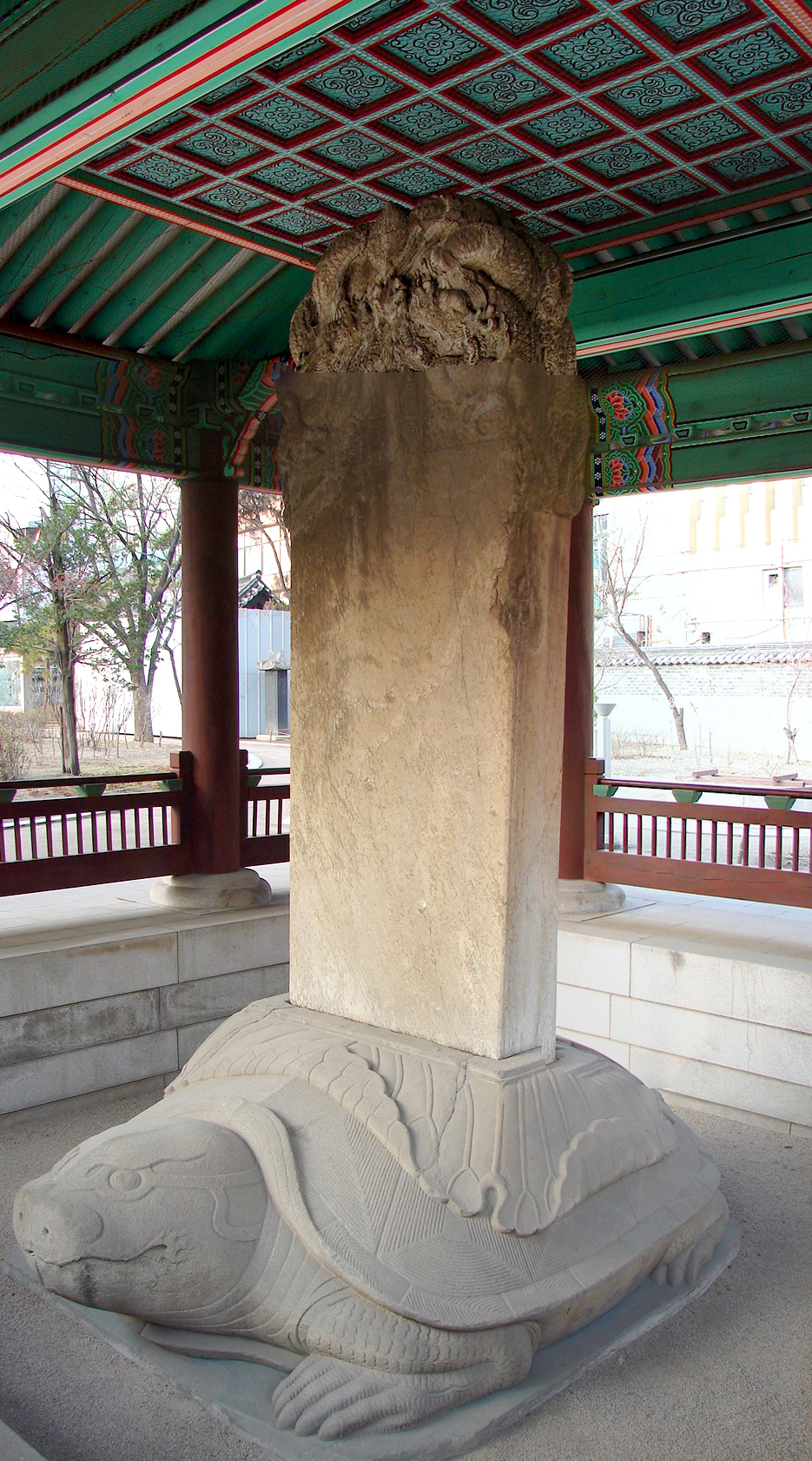
Monument to Wongaksa

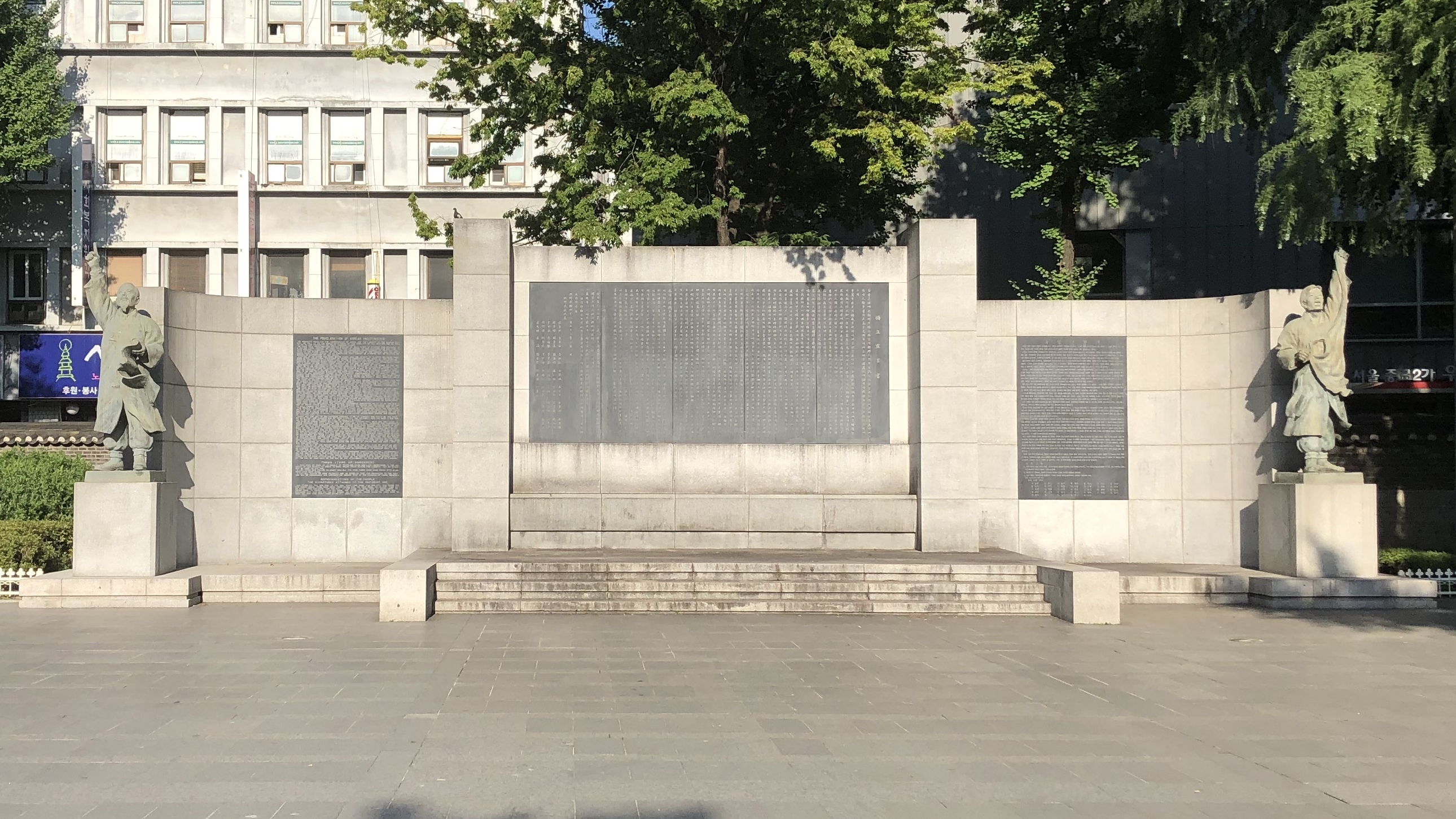
Monument to the Korean Declaration of Independence

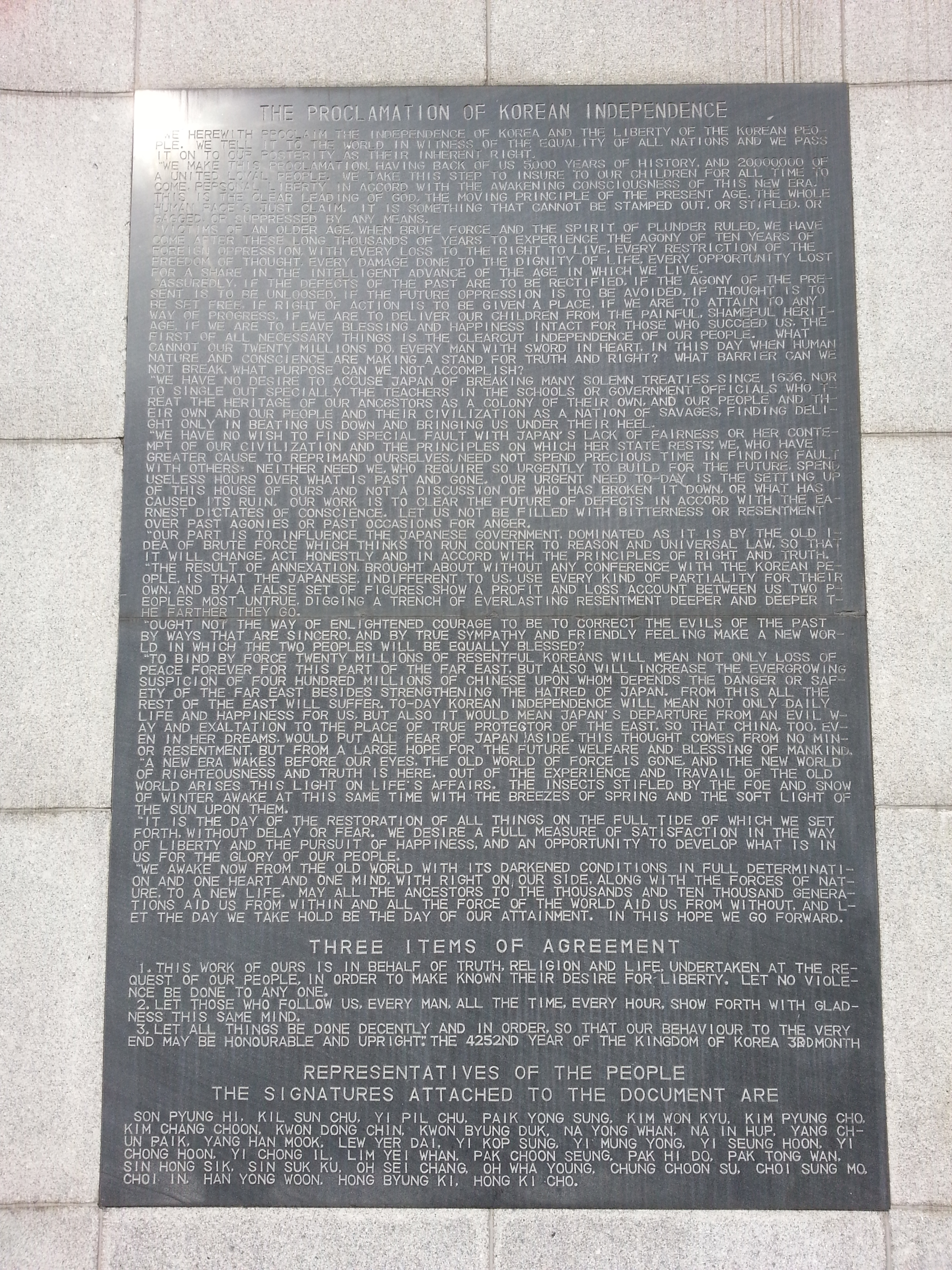
English version of the Proclamation of Korean Independence, displayed in Tapgol Park in Seoul

== See also ==
- Seodaemun Independence Park
- List of parks in Seoul
