= Mullae Park =

Park in Seoul, South Korea

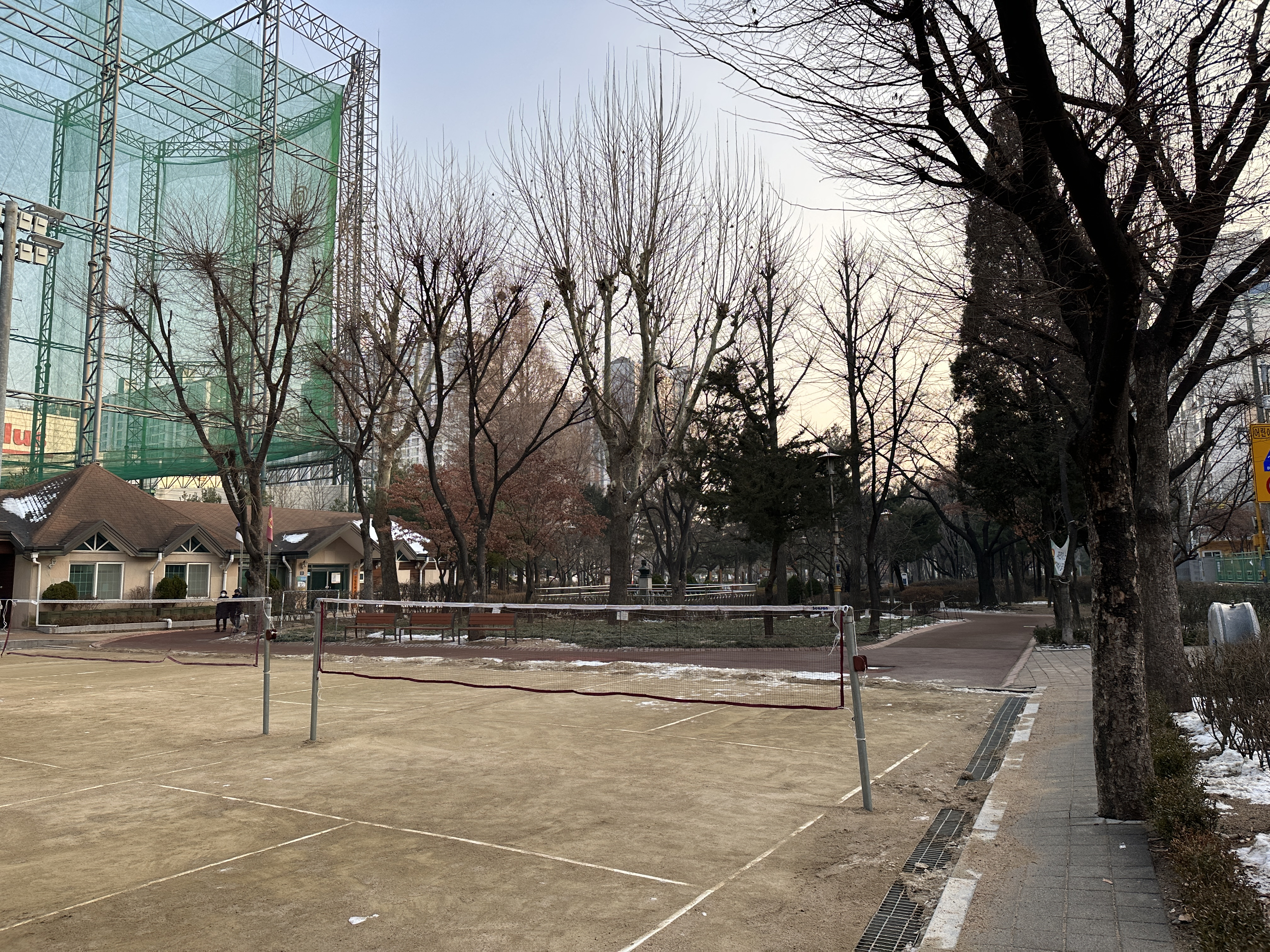
- The park, viewed from the north. Sports courts are visible. In the background, the rear of the fenced-off bust of Park Chung Hee is visible. (2023)
- Location: Mullae-dong, Yeongdeungpo District, Seoul, South Korea
- Coordinates: 37°30′58″N 126°53′38″E
- Established: 1986

Mullae Park (Korean: 문래공원; Hanja: 文來公園) is a park in Mullae-dong, Yeongdeungpo District, Seoul, South Korea. The park was established in 1986 and is widely used for leisure and exercise by nearby residents.

Before it was a park, it hosted several military facilities. Now, a large number of civilian amenities fill the area, including walkways, exercise equipment, playgrounds, and air purifiers.

== Relationship to Park Chung Hee ==
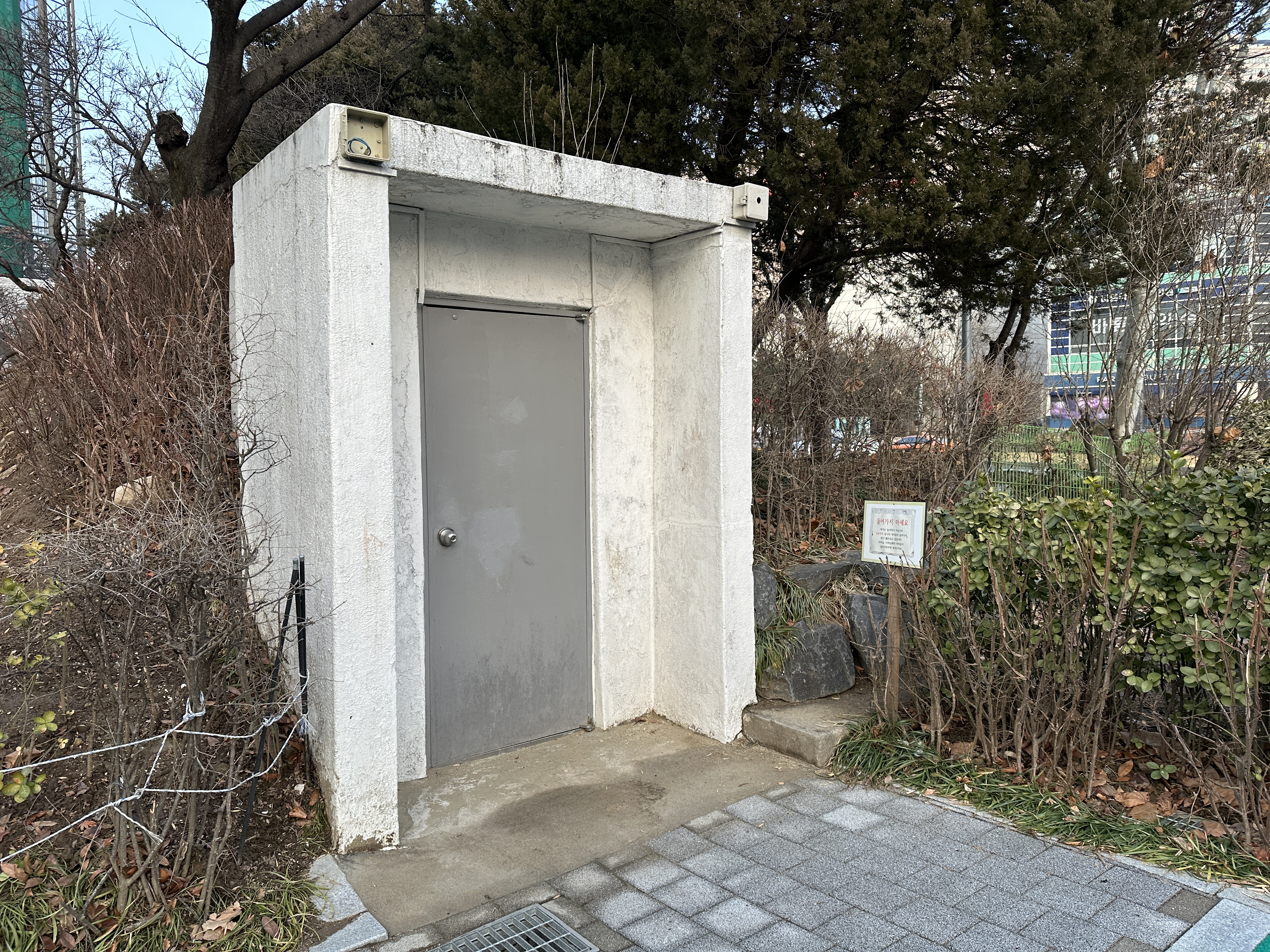
The bunker door, next to a playground. The door is unlabeled; the sign to the right describes it only as a "preserved area", and warns parents to keep their children away from it. (2023)

The park was once host to the South Korean Army's 6th District Headquarters: the birthplace of the May 16 Coup of 1961. It was during this coup that Park Chung Hee seized power. All that remains of the former bases is an underground bunker, the entrance to which is now behind a locked and unmarked door, near a children's playground.

=== Bust of Park ===
To commemorate this part of history, a bust depicting Park during his military years has been in the park since 1985. In 2000, after the Center for Historical Truth and Justice unveiled research on Park's blood oath of loyalty to Japan, the bust had a Japanese Rising Sun Flag tied to it, was knocked over, and dragged to the campus of Hongik University. The bust's nose was damaged in the process. The statue was reinstalled, and the nose was repaired by a memorial foundation to Park in 2006. In December 2016, during protests for the impeachment of Park's daughter President Park Geun-hye, Choe Hwang (최황) wrote "remove" ("철거하라") in red spray paint on the statue. Choe wrote angrily on Facebook about Park Chung Hee's role as a pro-Japanese collaborator ("chinilpa") and military dictator. For this, he was fined one million won.

The bust is now protected behind an iron fence. A nearby sign, prepared by the memorial foundation to Park, warns people of consequences for vandalism towards either the bust or the bunker.
