= Wolgwang Waterside Park =

Public park in Daegu, South Korea

- Hangul: 월광수변공원
- Hanja: 月光水邊公園
- RR: Wolgwang subyeon gongwon
- MR: Wŏlgwang subyŏn kongwŏn

Wolgwang Water's Edge Park is a park that is located in Daegu Dalseo-gu, South Korea. The area of park is 40,163 m^{2}. It opened in 2000 April. As there are a lot of roses around the park, a rose festival is held in spring.
