= Bongmu Leports Park =

Sports park in Daegu, South Korea

- 봉무레포츠공원
- Location within South Korea
- Interactive map of Bongmu Leports Park
- Type: Recreational Area
- Location: Daegu, South Korea
- Coordinates: 35°55′N 128°39′E
- Area: 4.6 hectares (11.4 acres)
- Created: October 1992

Bongmu Leports Park (Korean: 봉무레포츠공원; "leisure" and "sports") is a recreational park at PalGong mountain in Daegu, South Korea. It is opened 1992 October. All kinds of sports facilities is equipped such as foot volleyball court, a basketball court, a badminton court, a tennis court, roller skates court, a wrestling court, weight room.
