= Yeongdeungpo-dong =

- Interactive map of Yeongdeungpo-dong
- Coordinates: 37°31′20″N 126°54′31″E
- Country: South Korea

Area
  - Total: 1.98 km^{2} (0.76 sq mi)

Population (2001)
  - Total: 23,541
  - Density: 11,900/km^{2} (30,800/sq mi)

Korean name
- Hangul: 영등포동
- Hanja: 永登浦洞
- RR: Yeongdeungpo-dong
- MR: Yŏngdŭngp'o-dong

Yeongdeungpo-dong (Korean: 영등포동) is a dong (neighbourhood) of Yeongdeungpo District, Seoul, South Korea.

== See also ==
- Administrative divisions of South Korea
