= Unamji Waterside Park =

Park in Daegu, South Korea

- Hangul: 운암지수변공원
- Hanja: 雲岩池水邊公園
- RR: Unamji subyeon gongwon
- MR: Unamji subyŏn kongwŏn

Unamji Water's Edge Park is a park that is located in Daegu Buk-gu, South Korea. Construction of the park started on November 18, 1997, and it opened on April 24, 1998.

The park covers an area of 17,962 square metres (193,340 sq ft).
