= Bukhansan Bogungmun station =

Station of the Seoul Metropolitan Subway

Coordinates: 37°34′28″N 127°01′22″E

L09 북한산보국문(서경대) Bukhansan Bogungmun (Seokyeong University)
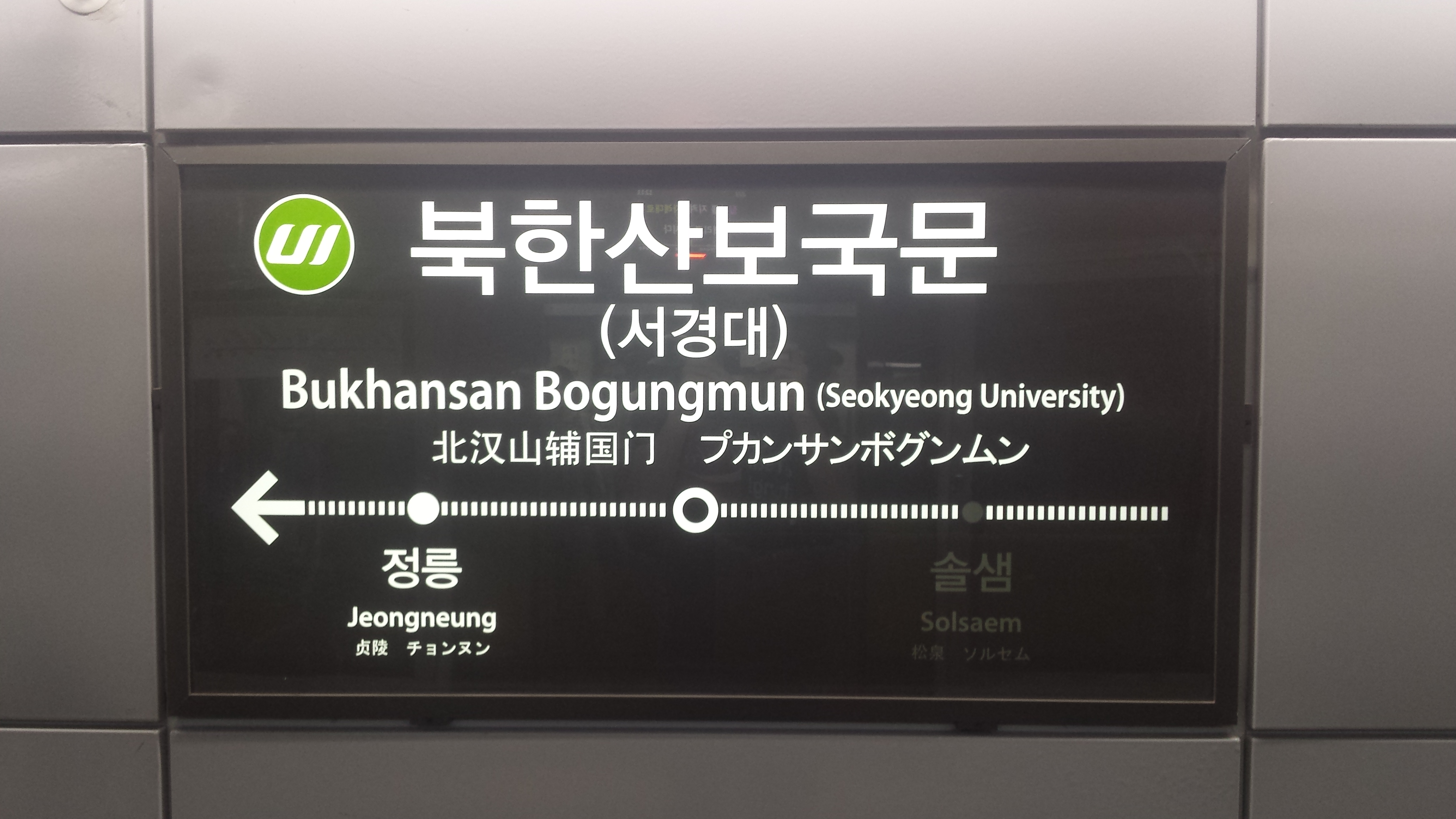

Korean name
- Hangul: 북한산보국문역
- Hanja: 北漢山輔國門驛
- Revised Romanization: Bukhansan bogungmun-yeok
- McCune–Reischauer: Pukhansan pogungmun-yŏk

General information
- Location: 286-19 Jeongneung-dong, Seongbuk-gu, Seoul
- Operator: UiTrans LRT Co., Ltd.
- Line: Ui LRT
- Platforms: 2
- Tracks: 2

Construction
- Structure type: Underground

History
- Opened: September 2, 2017

Services
| Preceding station | Seoul Metropolitan Subway | Following station |
|---|---|---|
| Solsaem towards Bukhansan Ui | Ui LRT | Jeongneung towards Sinseol-dong |
Location

Bukhansan Bogungmun station is a station on the Ui LRT located in Jeongneung-dong, Seongbuk District, Seoul. It opened on September 2, 2017.
