= Freedom of panorama =

Permissive provision in copyright laws

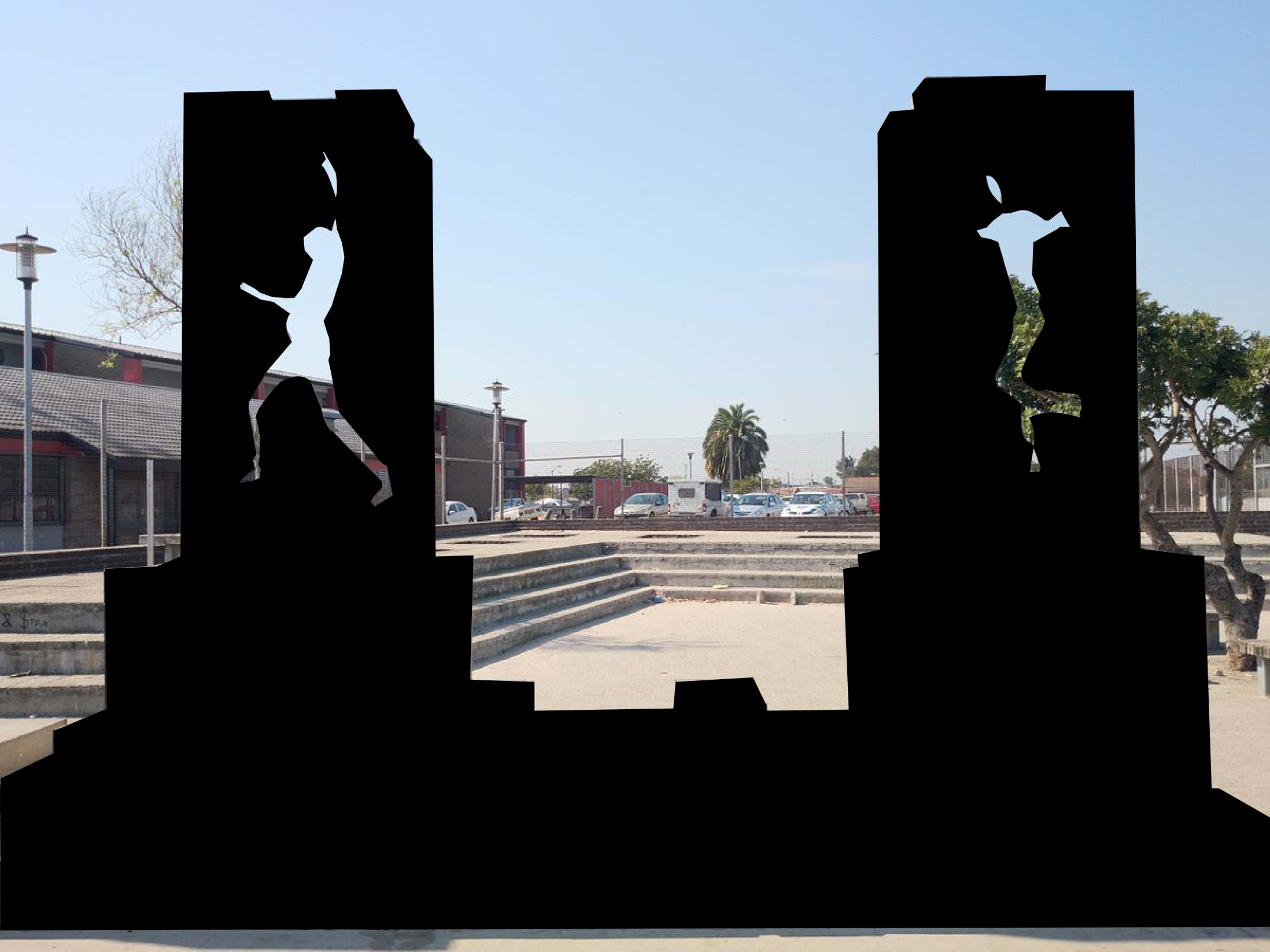
In South Africa, there is no freedom of panorama. Strict interpretation of copyright law means that copyrighted objects, like this statue, should be censored out.

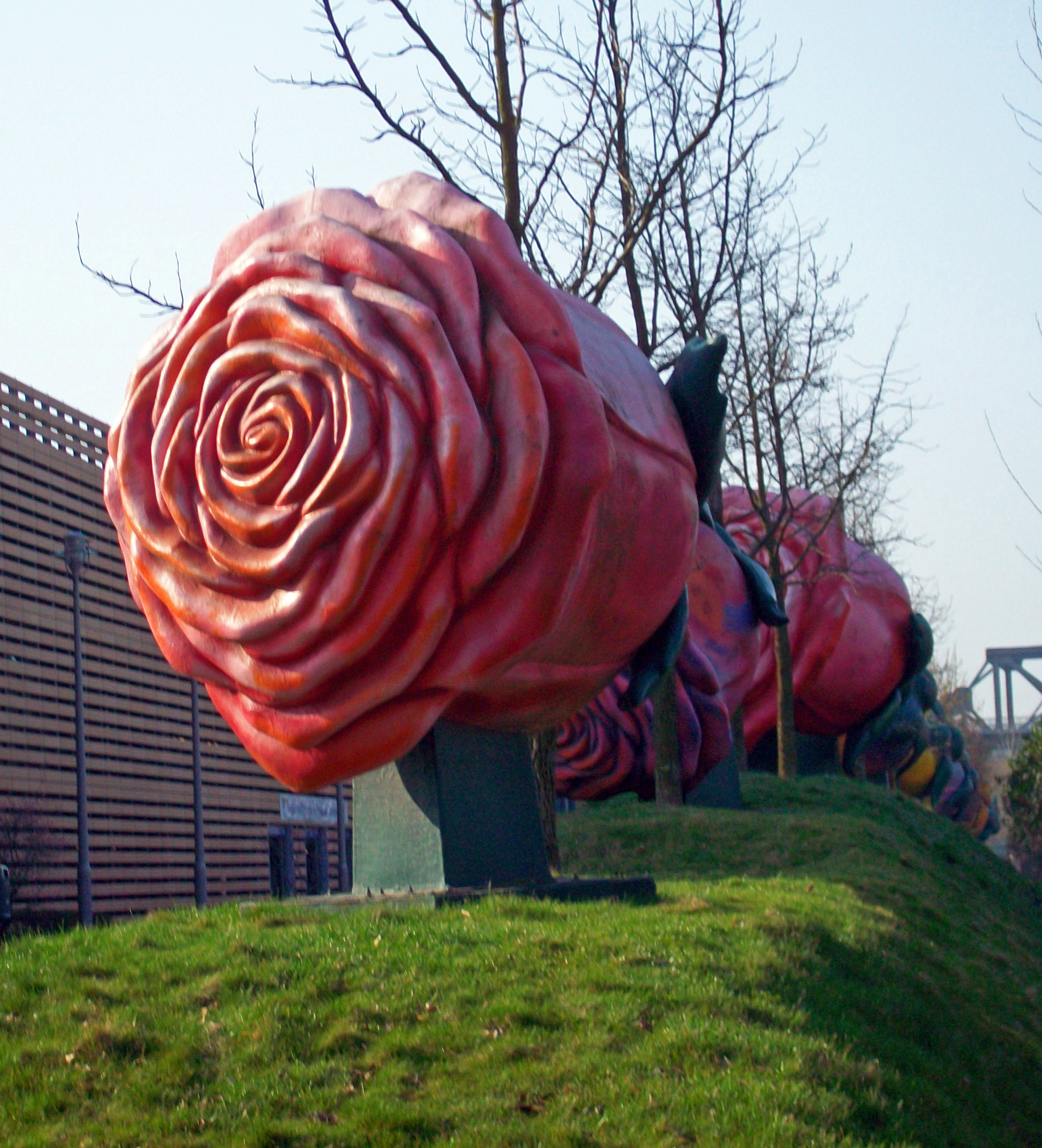
An image of sculptures by Sergej Alexander Dott, Himmelsblumen, 2003, Gleisdreieck, Berlin, published under the freedom of panorama provisions in German copyright law

Freedom of panorama (FoP) is a provision in the copyright laws of various jurisdictions that permits taking photographs and video footage and creating other images (such as paintings) of buildings and sometimes sculptures and other art works which are permanently located in a public space, without infringing on any copyright that may otherwise subsist in such works, and the publishing of such images. Panorama freedom statutes or case law limit the right of the copyright owner to take action for breach of copyright against the creators and distributors of such images. It is an exception to the normal rule that the copyright owner has the exclusive right to authorize the creation and distribution of derivative works.

== Background ==
In the past, photography and other methods of visually representing public space were severely restricted, for reasons other than authors' rights. France prohibited such acts in the 19th century for protection of privacy. Italy began disallowing representations of archaeological sites in engravings in the 18th century, even if such sites were found in public places, as a protection of their cultural heritage.

The concept of freedom of panorama originated in Germany in the 19th century. The Kingdom of Bavaria introduced an analogous exception in 1840 for pictorial depictions of "works of arts and architecture in their exterior contours" in public spaces. It was intended to reduce the severity of the new copyright rules of the German Confederation which prohibited reproductions, with exception to "mechanical reproductions." Other component states of the confederation soon emulated the legal right, and in 1876 the legal right, based on Bavarian exception, was finally implemented nationwide by the German parliament.

== Two-dimensional works ==
The precise extent of this permission to make pictures in public places without having to worry about copyrighted works being in the image differs amongst countries. In most countries, it applies only to images of three-dimensional works that are permanently installed in a public place, "permanent" typically meaning "for the natural lifetime of the work". In Switzerland, taking and publishing images of two-dimensional works such as murals or graffiti is permitted, but such images cannot be used for the same purpose as the originals.

== Public space ==
Many laws have subtle differences in regard to public space and private property. Whereas the photographer's location is irrelevant in Austria, in Germany the permission applies only if the image was taken from public ground, and without any further utilities such as ladders, lifting platforms, airplanes etc. Under certain circumstances, the scope of the permission is also extended to actually private grounds, e.g. to publicly accessible private parks and castles without entrance control, however with the restriction that the owner may then demand a fee for commercial use of the images.

In many Eastern European countries the copyright laws limit this permission to non-commercial uses of the images only.

There are also international differences in the particular definition of a "public place". In most countries, this includes only outdoor spaces (for instance, in Germany), while some other countries also include indoor spaces such as public museums; this is for instance the case in the UK and in Russia.

== Controversies and criticism ==
Freedom of panorama remains a contentious issue in many European countries. Politico remarked that the issue had "national, ideological and even generational divisions" within the continent with respect to the governance of their digital future. During the European Parliament debate in 2015 concerning the regulation of the panorama exception within the region, former French MEP Jean-Marie Cavada denounced former German MEP Felix Reda who had proposed making freedom of panorama a law in the region. Cavada accused Reda of "leading the offensive to allow US monopolies, such as Facebook and Wikipedia, to escape paying copyrights".

In the Asia–Pacific region, Jonathan Barrett, a senior lecturer at Victoria University of Wellington's School of Accounting and Commercial Law, criticized the liberal models of freedom of panorama adopted by several countries in the region. These models – influenced by British heritage (covering buildings and sculptures), US heritage (covering buildings only), and Chinese/Malaysian practices (covering buildings and public art) – do not restrict the commercial or lucrative use of relevant works. Barrett argued that these liberal models disadvantage indigenous communities in the region and cited the case of the stock image website Alamy, which failed to appropriately credit Ra Vincent as the author of Wai-titi Landing in the images of the New Zealand sculpture hosted on the platform. He suggested the implementation of an "Asian Pacific Copyright Code" to standardize freedom of panorama rules across the region. This regional law would eliminate distinctions between two-dimensional and three-dimensional works and prohibit the commercial use of any works in public spaces without permission from the authors or their guardians. Barrett argued that such a region-wide measure would help prevent what he described as "offensive reproductions". With regard to non-profit organizations such as the Wikimedia Foundation, Barrett argued that they should be permitted to display non-commercially licensed images of such works in public spaces for the purpose of educating and entertaining readers, without compromising the authors' rights, in accordance with the principle outlined in Article 9(2) of the Berne Convention.

== International agreements ==
There are no explicit regulations concerning freedom of panorama in any of the international copyright treaties, such as Berne Convention, WIPO Copyright Treaty, Universal Copyright Convention, and TRIPS Agreement. Nevertheless, these treaties often provide a three-step test as a general limitation against which national provisions on the freedom of panorama must be measured, such as Article 10 (2nd paragraph) of WIPO Copyright Treaty, Article 13 of TRIPS, and Article 9 (2nd paragraph) of the revised Berne Convention (though only for reproduction).

Then-United States Register of Copyrights Ralph Oman noted a joint undertaking between the World Intellectual Property Organization and UNESCO in the 1980s for a Draft Model Copyright Law, which included a set of draft principles focused on architectural works. A freedom of panorama-like provision was to be regulated under Principle WA7: "The reproduction of the external images of works of architecture by means of photography, cinematography, painting, sculpture, drawing or similar methods should not require the authorization of their authors if it is done for private purposes or, even if it is done for commercial purposes, where the works of architecture are on a public street, road or square or in any other place normally accessible to the public." Mixed reactions were a proposal to extend the principle to images taken from airspace and satellites, questions on whether the images should extend to interior architecture, and criticism due to giving away the rights of the architects to the public too much and not providing the condition of remuneration for commercial uses of external images. These proposals did not attain enough support for inclusion, and according to the Committee of Governmental Experts the principle for the panorama exception was reproduced "without changes".

== FoP law around the world ==
Many countries have similar provisions restricting the scope of copyright law in order to explicitly permit photographs involving scenes of public places or scenes photographed from public places. Other countries, though, differ widely in their interpretation of the principle.

Freedom of panorama status around the world for images used for commercial purposes

=== European Union ===
Status of freedom of panorama in Europe for exterior works of art OK for commercial use, including buildings and works of art OK for commercial use of buildings only, commercial use of works of art not permitted Non-commercial use only, commercial use illegal Not OK, regardless of the nature of the usage

In the European Union, Directive 2001/29/EC provides for the possibility of member states having a freedom of panorama clause in their copyright laws, but does not require such a rule.

In 2015, former German MEP Felix Reda proposed applying freedom of panorama to all countries of the European Union. He claimed that through the exception people would be free to share images of public spaces that might contain buildings and public art, in order "to express and share their experiences and thoughts" and to "preserve our journeys and curate our impressions for entire generations to come."

His proposal was criticized by former French MEP Jean-Marie Cavada, who introduced an alternate proposal seeking to restrict freedom of panorama provisions of all the European Union countries to non-commercial uses only. Cavada claimed that commercial freedom of panorama harms the rights of the authors of architectural and artistic works by allowing entities like Wikimedia and Facebook to exploit the works commercially without compensation to the authors; his office added that non-commercial freedom of panorama would not affect Internet freedom, but would guarantee that "platforms like Facebook, Instagram, and Flickr provide fair compensation to artists." Dailymotion and YouTube earlier had agreements with the collective management society ADAGP, in 2008 for Dailymotion and 2010 for YouTube, for legal use of images of buildings and public art on their platforms. ADAGP argued the panorama exception would lead to "a loss of 3 to 6 million euros, or 10 to 19% of the collections" annually in France alone.

Criticism to Cavada's proposal culminated in an online petition by digital rights activists with hashtag #SaveFOP, garnering more than 460,000 signatures within two weeks after its launch. IT journalist Andrew Orlowski of The Register alleges that Wikipedia's intervention to the debate is "bogus and misleading". The United Kingdom-based fact-checking website Full Fact remarks that only the European Commission has the power to craft new legislation, and that any recommendation approved by the parliament cannot necessarily influence the commission.

On July 9, the plenary of the European Parliament rejected Cavada's restrictive proposal; however, former Dutch MEP Marietje Schaake's proposal to extend the permissive provision to other EU countries did not pass. Freedom of panorama throughout the region remained at status quo.

==== Austria ====
The fifth item of the first paragraph of Article 54 of the Urheberrechtsgesetz permits a freedom of panorama exception: "reproduction, distribution, public dissemination by means of optical devices, broadcasting and making available to the public works of architecture based on a completed building or other works of fine arts based on pieces of art that have been made to be permanently located in a public place; exceptions are the reproduction of works of architecture, the reproduction of a work of painting or graphic arts for permanent installation in a place of the type mentioned, as well as the reproduction of works of sculpture by the sculpture".

==== Belgium ====
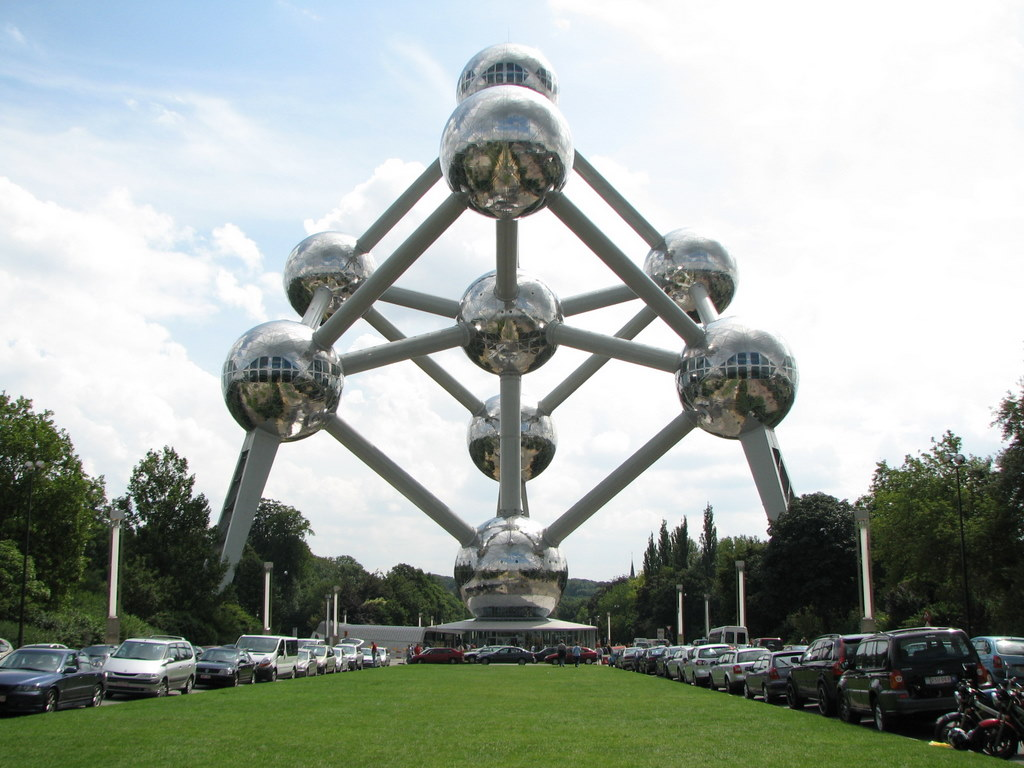
The Atomium, taken in 2006. Before 2016, this image would have been illegal to reproduce commercially.

Freedom of panorama was introduced in Belgium on June 27, 2016, with the addition of a new provision in the Economic Code. According to XI.190 2/1°, the authors of architectural, visual, and graphic artworks permanently situated in public places cannot restrict the reproduction and public communication of such works, "providing that it concerns the reproduction or communication of the work as it is and that said reproduction or public communication does not affect the normal exploitation of the work and does not unreasonably prejudice the legitimate interests of the author". The provision came into effect on July 15, 2016.

Since the provision became effective, people are able to take photographs of Brussels' famous Atomium landmark and distribute these for any purpose, including sharing of such photos to their families and friends on social media, freely and without risk of copyright lawsuits from the current copyright holders of the work. The rightsholders of Atomium, however, continue to assert that commercial uses of any depictions of the landmark are still subject to prior permission and royalty fees, notwithstanding the introduction of the legal right in the country.

==== Denmark ====
Article 24(2) of the Danish copyright law allows the pictorial reproductions of artistic works situated in public places, if the purpose is non-commercial. Article 24(3) states that buildings can be freely reproduced in pictorial form.

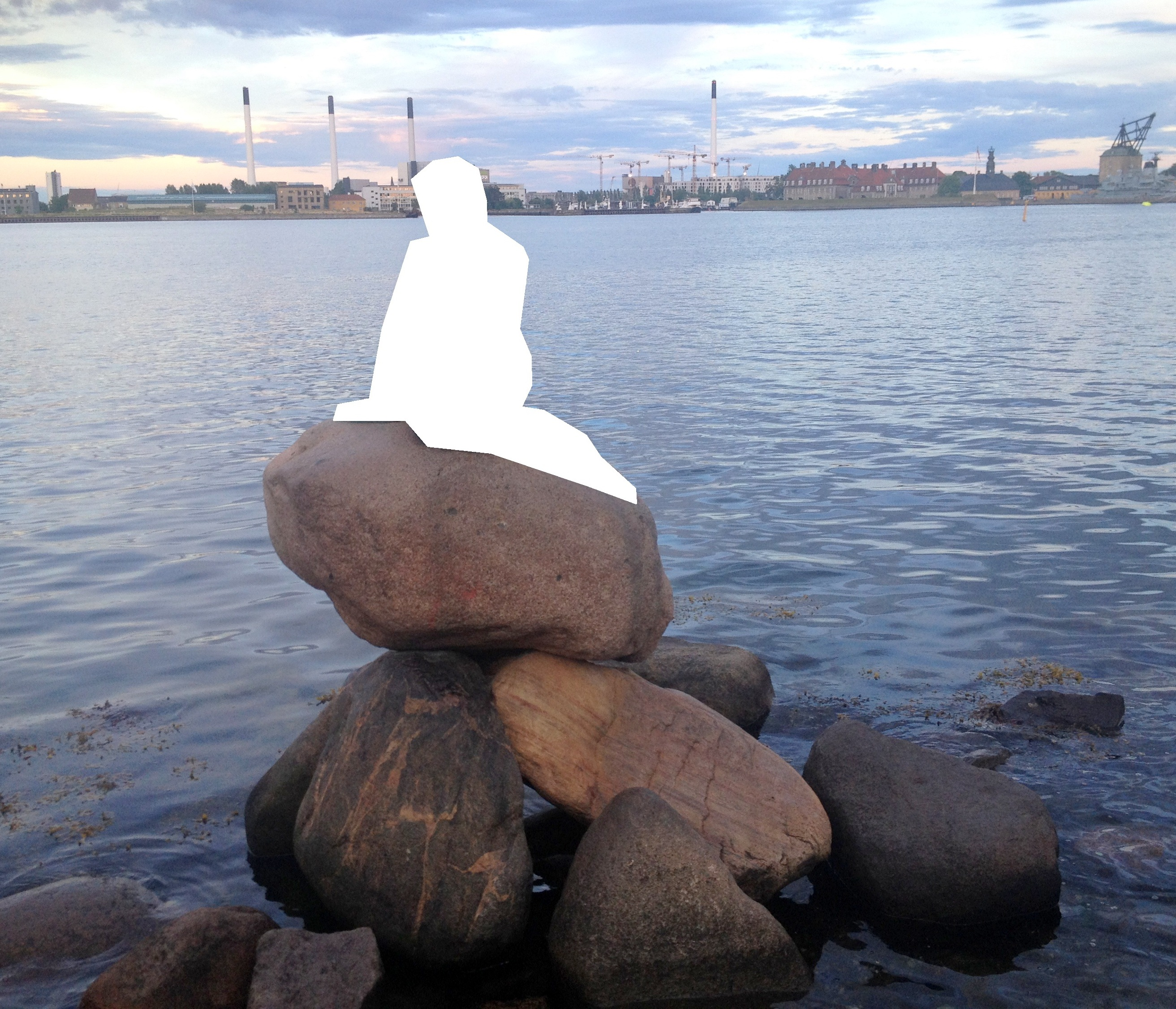
Censored image of The Little Mermaid

There is still no full freedom of panorama for non-architectural works in Denmark. The Little Mermaid, a sculpture by Edvard Eriksen (who died in 1959), is under copyright until 2030, and the Eriksen family is known to be litigious. Several Danish newspapers have been sued for using images of the sculpture without permission by the Eriksen family. The purpose of the Danish media is considered commercial. Søren Lorentzen, photo editor of Berlingske which was one of the newspapers slapped with fines, once lamented, "We used a photo without asking for permission. That was apparently a clear violation of copyright laws, even though I honestly have a hard time understanding why one can't use photos of a national treasure like the Little Mermaid without violating copyright laws." Alice Eriksen, granddaughter of the sculptor, defended the restrictions and said that such restrictions are in compliance of the laws of the country. She added, "It's the same as receiving royalties when a song is played." Berlingske was sued again after exploiting the statue in 2019 as an illustration in a cartoon concerning debate culture in the country, as well as using an image of the sculpture in 2020 "to represent a link between the far right and people fearing COVID-19." They were ordered by the Eastern High Court to pay 300,000 kroner ($46,000) worth of compensation to the Eriksen family, which was increased from 285,000 kroner ($44,000) as ruled by a district court. However, the Danish Supreme Court ruled on May 17, 2023, that "neither the caricature drawing nor the photograph of The Little Mermaid with a mask on, which was brought to Berlingske in connection with newspaper articles, infringed the copyright of the heirs to the sculpture The Little Mermaid", citing the parody principle enshrined in the copyright law of Denmark.

==== Estonia ====
Freedom of panorama in Estonia, found at Section 20¹ of the Copyright Act, is restricted to non-commercial use of images of works of architecture, visual art, applied art, and photographs permanently situated in places open to the public. Also, the images must not show the said works as main subjects. A very limited provision for commercial use of architecture exists at Section 20², restricted for "real estate advertisements" only. The Cultural Affairs Committee of the Riigikogu discussed the freedom of panorama on June 6, 2016, with the committee chairman Laine Randjärv stressing the need to establish a common but clear wording on freedom of panorama for all member states of the European Union for an efficient functioning of the digital internal market "for the greater good of the society." According to a representative of the Ministry of Justice, most of the nearly 40 agencies and stakeholders who answered the questionnaire support the expansion of the freedom of panorama through clarification of the exception, but several groups representing authors are opposed to this amendment.

==== Finland ====
Finnish freedom of panorama, found at third and fourth paragraphs of Article 25a of their copyright law, is very limited when it comes to public art. Works permanently located in public spaces cannot be photographed for commercial purposes if those become the main subjects in the photographs. The provision, however, explicitly permits newspapers and magazines to fully exploit public art, provided that there exist captions that accompany the published photographs. In contrast, buildings can be freely photographed with no non-commercial restrictions.

==== France ====
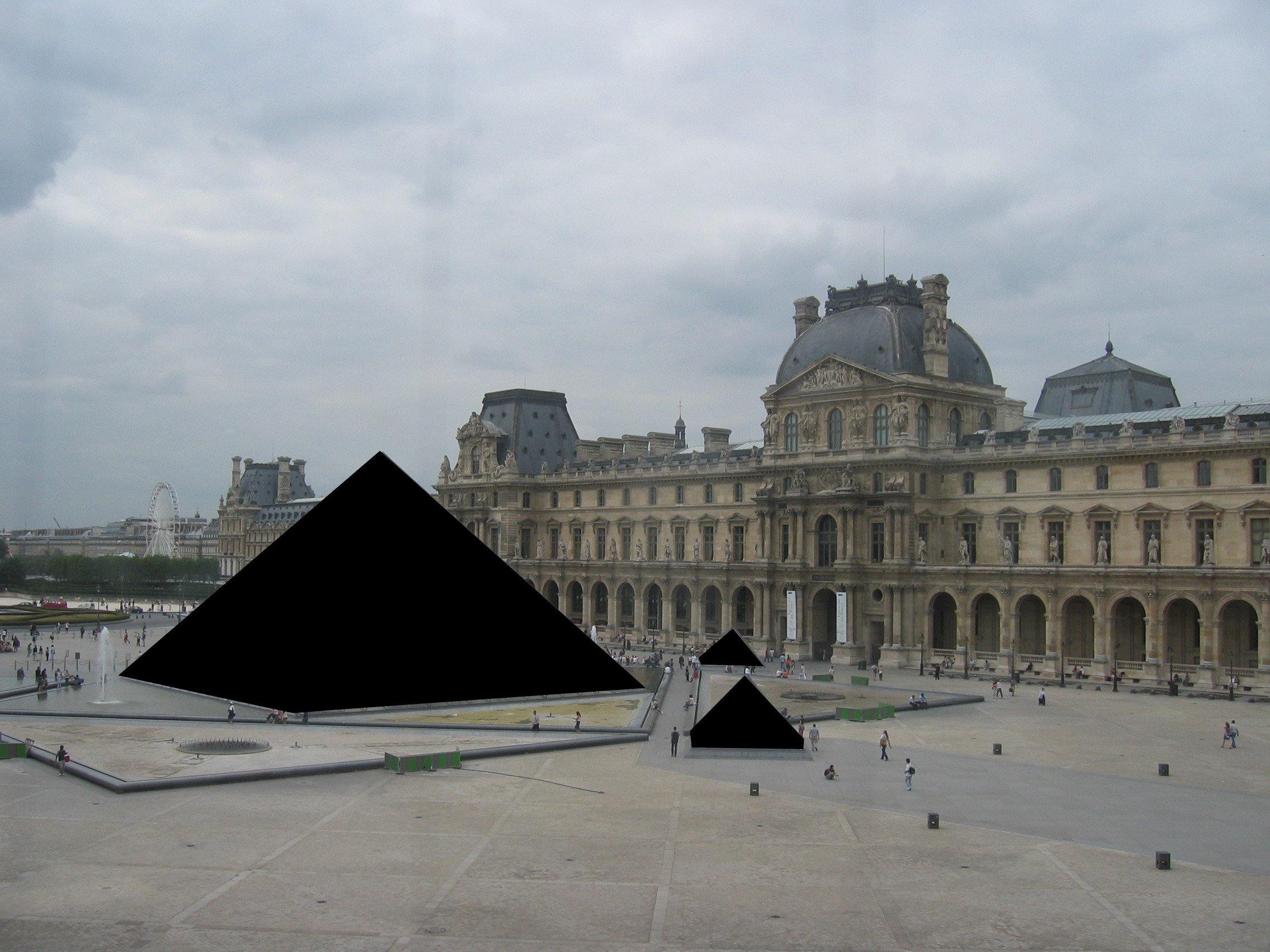
Due to the lack of complete freedom of panorama, this image depicting the Louvre Pyramid was censored out.

Since October 7, 2016, article L122-5 of the French Code of Intellectual Property provides for a limited freedom of panorama for works of architecture and sculpture. The code authorizes "reproductions and representations of works of architecture and sculpture, placed permanently in public places (voie publique), and created by natural persons, with the exception of any usage of a commercial character". French lawmakers and politicians were reluctant to introduce freedom of panorama in the past; former National Assembly member Patrick Bloche in 2011 called freedom of panorama an "amendement Wikipédia".

Works of architecture and sculptures have explicitly been protected under French law since 1902, when the former 1793 act was amended to extend the protection to "works of sculptures", simultaneously including works made by "architects" (buildings themselves as "works of sculptures" in the 1902 amendment).

For-profit reproductions of recent architectural works by photographers, filmmakers, graphic artists, or other third party users without permission from the architect or the entity whom the architect has assigned their patrimonial rights to are copyright infringement. Two separate court decisions in 1990 ruled that unauthorized postcards depicting Grande Arche and La Géode as principal subjects constitute infringements. Other monumental works protected by copyright include the Louvre Pyramid, the Opéra Bastille, and the new buildings of the Bibliothèque nationale de France.

French jurisprudence has never considered "accessory" reproduction as a copyright infringement even in for-profit reproductions, if the element reproduced is not the main subject being depicted. In a 2005 case concerning postcards of Lyon's Place des Terreaux, the Cour de cassation upheld the lower courts' decisions on the accessory inclusion of the plaza's modern artistic constructions on postcards, stating that the copyrighted works blended in with the public domain architecture of the plaza surroundings, and that "the work of art was of secondary importance to the subject", which is the plaza itself.

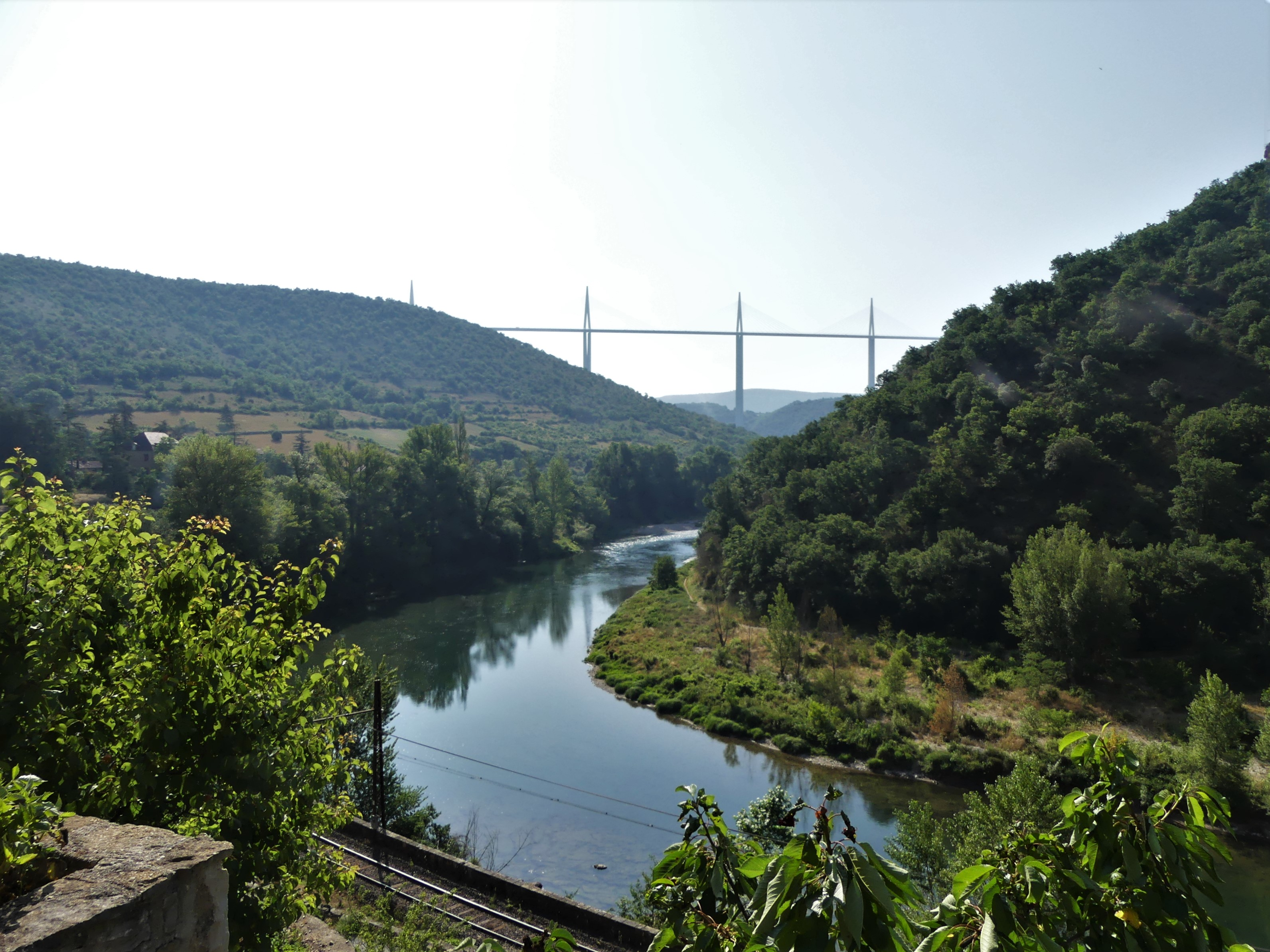
Photo of Tarn River in southern France, with the copyrighted Millau Viaduct in the background

CEVM (Compagnie Eiffage du Viaduc de Millau), the exclusive beneficiary of all property rights of Millau Viaduct on behalf of its architect Norman Foster, in their website explicitly requires that professional and/or commercial uses of images of the bridge are subject to "prior express permission of the CEVM". Additionally, CEVM has the sole right to distribute images of the viaduct in souvenir items such as postcards. However, private and/or non-commercial uses of images are tolerated by CEVM. Also exempted from obligatory permission and remuneration payment are "landscape images where the Viaduct appears in the background and is thus not the main focus of the image."

Shooting of a film in France involving uses of buildings still protected by architectural copyrights requires additional authorization from the architect or their representative or assignee, alongside a film permit. The length of time the building's appearance is used, the genre of the film or audio-visual work, the type of use, and the manner in which the building's appearance is used are all factors that are weighed in when calculating the amount to be paid in using the architectural work. Such permission is not required if the architecture "is not the main object" of the film.

In 2023, a French appeals court awarded €40,000 to a graffiti artist whose depiction of an Asian Marianne (in response to the violent arrest of Théo Luhaka) was used in LFI campaign videos in 2017 and 2020. A lower court had rejected the artist's claim to €900,000 in damages two years earlier. The appeals court, according to Agathe Zajdela, set a new precedence regarding graphic works like street art: that such works are not works of architecture or sculptures and therefore not under the scope of the non-commercial panorama exception, and that such works are not permanently placed on public roads because those are subject to natural hazards like inclement weather.

==== Germany ====
Panoramafreiheit is defined in article 59 of the German Urheberrechtsgesetz, and the legal right is only limited to works "permanently situated along public thoroughfares, streets, and squares" as well as to the exteriors of architectural works. The current clause dates to the January 1, 1966 version of the copyright act of the former West Germany. A proposal in 1962 to require the public to pay remuneration for commercial uses of such works was rejected, since the permanent placement of such works in public spaces denotes the works being "dedicated to the public". Another 1962 proposal to extend the panorama exception to museum indoors was also turned down, considering that museum artworks "are not dedicated to the public to the same extent as the works that are displayed in public places".

A 2002 decision by the Federal Court of Justice denied the panorama exception to postcards of Christo and Jeanne-Claude's Wrapped Reichstag made by a Berlin publisher, due to the non-permanent nature of the architectural exhibition; the court opined that unauthorized private uses of images of it are permissible under the law.

An example of litigation due to the EU legislation is the Hundertwasserentscheidung (Hundertwasser decision), a case won by Friedensreich Hundertwasser in Germany against a German company for use of a photo of an Austrian building.

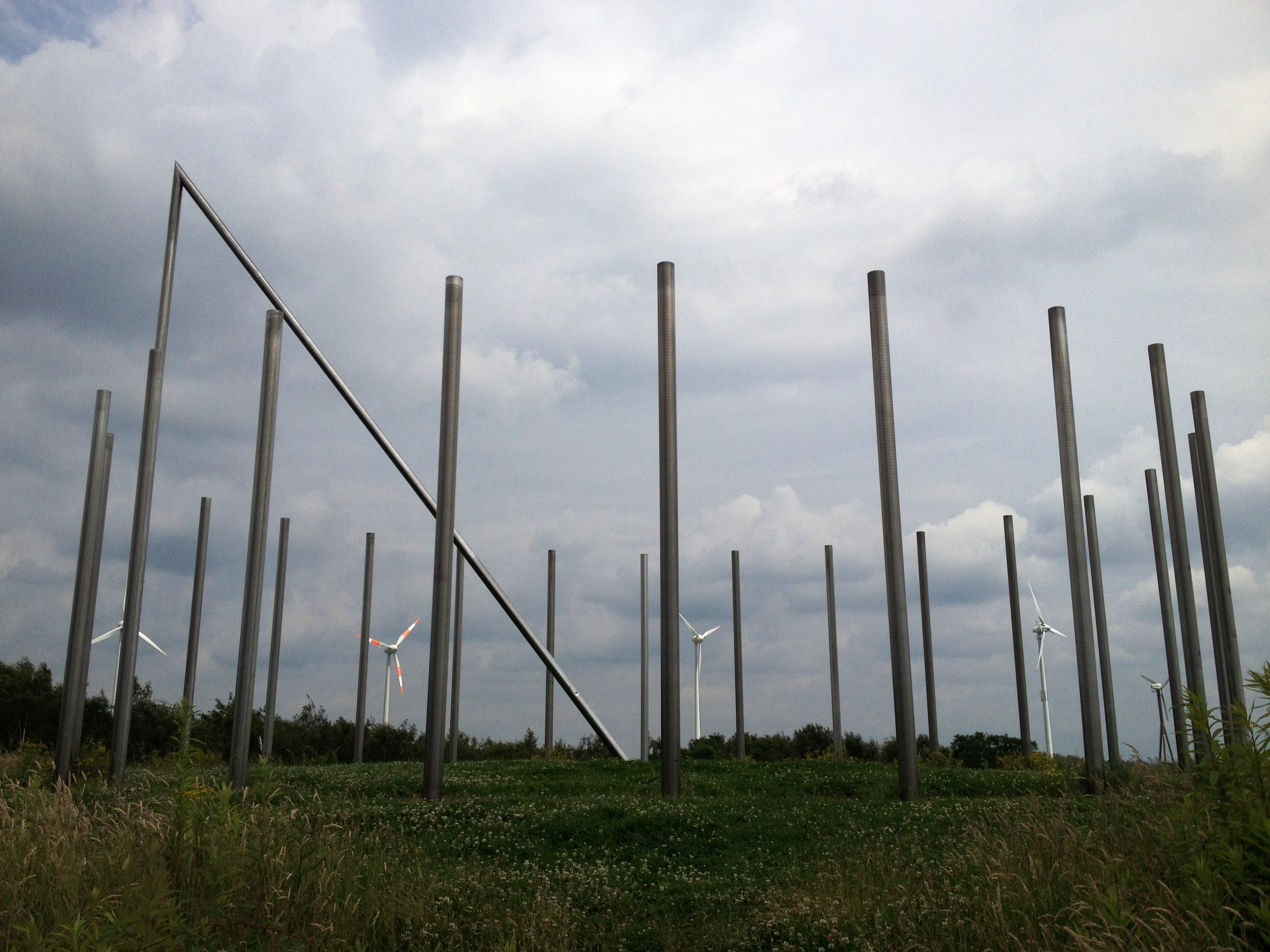
Sundial with Geo-Cross, a 1994 sculpture by Jan Bormann in Castrop-Rauxel. It was involved in the 2024 decision of the Federal Court of Justice denying panorama exception to the commercial use of drone images of public art like this.

In accordance with a 2024 decision by the Federal Court of Justice, drone photographs of copyrighted public art are not covered by the panorama exception, upholding a ruling by the Higher Regional Court of Hamm a year before, which in turn upheld an earlier ruling by the Regional Court of Bochum. The case involved a Ruhr-based book publisher that sold books containing drone images of art installations made by artists who were represented by the plaintiff, the artists' society Verwertungsgesellschaft Bild-Kunst. Accordingly, the FoP legal right only protects images taken from the street level, and not images taken using special devices such as ladders; drone images are from airspace which is "generally inaccessible to the public" and should not be made available for public distribution or marketing purposes. Lawyer Arndt Kempgens opines that the ruling also applies to content creators who exploit such artworks through drone photography on platforms like YouTube and TikTok, and that drone images used prior to the ruling may also be affected, suggesting a possible retroactive effect.

==== Greece ====
Freedom of panorama does not exist in Greece. The Greek copyright law, 2121/1993 on Copyright, Related Rights and Cultural Matters (as last amended in 2021), only provides a vague but restrictive exception allowing "occasional reproduction and communication by the mass media of images of architectural works, fine art works, photographs or works of applied art, which are sited permanently in a public place."

==== Hungary ====
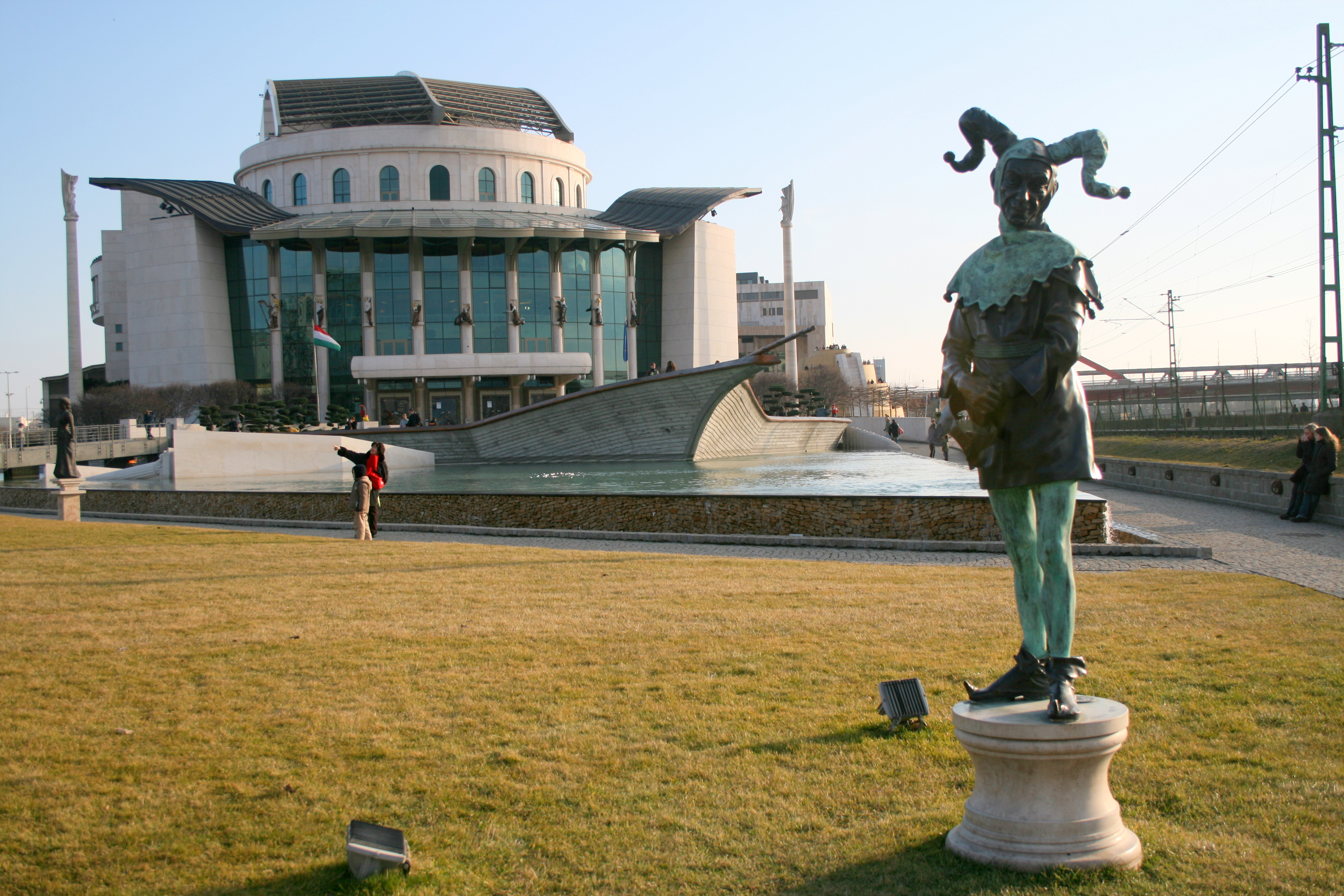
The National Theatre (authored by architect Mária Siklós in 2002) in the background and the Statue of Kálmán Latabár (authored by sculptor Péter Raab Párkányi in 2002) in the foreground

Article 68(1) of the Hungarian copyright law states that views of fine arts, architectural and applied arts permanently situated in public outdoors can be made and used without the need of permission from and remuneration to the authors of the works.

==== Ireland ====
Article 93 of the Copyright and Related Rights Act, 2000 provides freedom of panorama for buildings (and models thereof), sculptures and works of artistic craftsmanship which are "permanently situated in a public place or in premises open to the public". Such works may be photographed, filmed, broadcast on television, or otherwise reproduced without infringing the copyright in the work. Copies of such reproductions do not infringe the copyright in the original work.

==== Italy ====
In Italy freedom of panorama does not exist. Despite many official protests and a national initiative led by the lawyer Guido Scorza and the journalist Luca Spinelli (who highlighted the issue), the publishing of photographic reproductions of public places is still prohibited, in accordance with the old Italian copyright laws. A 2004 law called Codice Urbani states, among other provisions, that to publish pictures of "cultural goods" (meaning in theory every cultural and artistic object and place) for commercial purposes, it is mandatory to obtain an authorization from the local branch of the Ministry of Arts and Cultural Heritage, the Soprintendenza.

==== Latvia ====
Latvian copyright law provides for a restrictive freedom of panorama provision limited to non-commercial uses only. Images of works permanently showcased in public spaces, including architecture, visual arts, and applied arts, can only be exploited "for personal use and as information in news broadcasts or reports of current events, or include in works for non-commercial purposes."

==== Luxembourg ====
Freedom of panorama is not granted in Luxembourg. Article 10(7°) of their copyright law permits the depictions of public art found in publicly-accessible places, if the said works "are not the main subject of reproduction or communication."

==== The Netherlands ====
The Netherlands has freedom of panorama; this is regulated in Article 18 of the Copyright Act. Self-made photographs of works of art (including buildings) in public spaces may be freely distributed, as long as the photo is an image of the work "as it is there". It is therefore not permitted to edit the photo in such a way that (almost) only the subject is visible, or to create a derivative work that no longer meets this condition (for example, a stylized representation or a silhouette of the work). In addition, the legislator also stipulates that when including such images in a compilation work (collection) of works, only a few works by the same creator may be included. The Netherlands had a restricted freedom of panorama during 1972–2004; during that time, works pictured were not allowed to be the main subjects of the images. As part of the expansion of the scope of the copyright exceptions during the implementation of Directive 2001/29/EC in 2004, this incidental inclusion restriction was abolished.

==== Poland ====
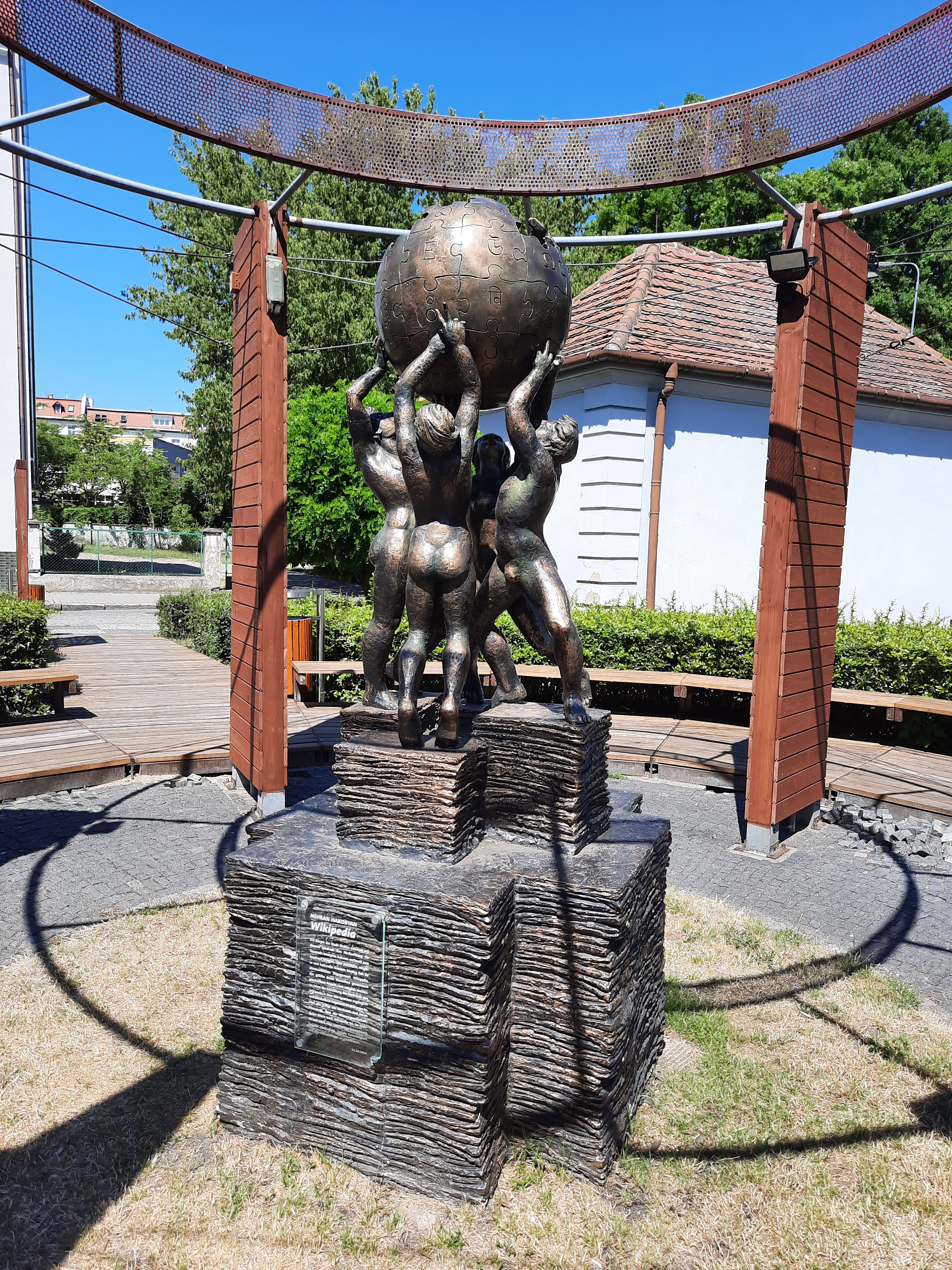
Wikipedia Monument, unveiled in 2014 and authored by Armenian sculptor Mihran Hakobyan

There is adequate freedom of panorama in Poland, guaranteed by Article 33(1) of the Act on Copyright and Related Rights. It states that "it is permissible to disseminate works permanently displayed in generally accessible roads, streets, squares or gardens, but not for the same use." Distribution is through the use of photographs or pictorial representations of works (such as buildings and public sculptures) in any media, including commercial video games and apps. Because the purpose of a photograph of such a work (such as an office building, a shopping mall, or a bridge) is not the same as the original purpose of establishing a work, it is a permissible use under national copyright law.

==== Portugal ====
Freedom of panorama for Portuguese works is found at Article 75, paragraph 2, point q. of the Portuguese Code of Authors' Rights and Neighbouring Rights, covering permanent works in public spaces such as architecture and sculptures. However, it is regulated by Article 76, paragraph 1, point a., that requires attribution of the author and the identification of the name of the work for every free use, including the use of works under Portuguese freedom of panorama.

==== Romania ====
There is no full freedom of panorama in Romania; it is limited only to non-commercial purposes. Under Article 35(f) of their copyright law, it is allowed to reproduce, distribute, and communicate to the public images of architectural, sculptural, photographic, and applied art works situated in public places, except that if the works become the main subject of the reproduction and if this reproduction is used for commercial purposes.

==== Slovenia ====
Article 55 of the Copyright and Related Rights Act of Slovenia states that "Works that are permanently situated in parks, streets, squares, or other generally accessible places shall be freely exploited," but this is prohibited if the intent of exploitation is for profit. In practice, however, this means that without permission from the author of the works, objects like buildings and statues whose copyrights have not yet expired can only be photographed for personal use, and publications of such images in a tourism portal or a newspaper are prohibited (since newspaper publishing is considered commercial).

==== Spain ====
The copyright law of Spain provides a freedom of panorama provision at Article 35(2), which states that "works permanently located in parks, streets, squares or other public thoroughfares may be freely reproduced, distributed and communicated by means of paintings, drawings, photographs and audiovisual procedures."

==== Sweden ====
On April 4, 2016, the Swedish Supreme Court ruled that Wikimedia Sweden infringed on the copyright of artists of public artwork by creating a website and database of public artworks in Sweden, containing images of public artwork uploaded by the public. Swedish copyright law contains an exception to the copyright holder's exclusive right to make their works available to the public that allows depictions of public artwork. The Swedish Supreme Court decided to take a restrictive view of this copyright exception. The Court determined that the database was not of insignificant commercial value, for both the database operator or those accessing the database, and that "this value should be reserved for the authors of the works of art. Whether the operator of the database actually has a commercial purpose is then irrelevant." The case was returned to a lower court to determine damages that Wikimedia Sweden owes to the collective rights management agency Bildkonst Upphovsrätt i Sverige (BUS), which initiated the lawsuit on behalf of artists they represent.

In 2017, Wikimedia Sweden was ordered to pay damages equivalent to around US$89,000 to BUS.

=== Former Soviet Union states ===
After the breakup of the Soviet Union most of the former member states lacked complete freedom of panorama. For instance, Article 20 of the Azerbaijani copyright law and Article 21 of the Kazakh copyright law do allow photography of public art and architecture but those works should not become main subjects if the images are to be used commercially. Ukraine introduced a limited freedom of panorama exception in 2022, as part of reforms in their Law of Copyright and Related Rights. Accordingly, images of public monuments and architecture can be created freely, "provided that such actions do not have independent economic value." There exists Ukrainian case laws from 2007 to 2009 in which four commercial entities were found to have infringed Vasyl Borodai's copyright on his 1982 Monument to the Founders of Kyiv.

However, changes were made in some countries after 2000 closer to the status in US and western countries.

==== Armenia ====
Armenia decided in April 2013 to update its legislation in the Armenian law on copyright.

==== Moldova ====
Moldova approximated its law in question in July 2010 to EU standards.

==== Russia ====
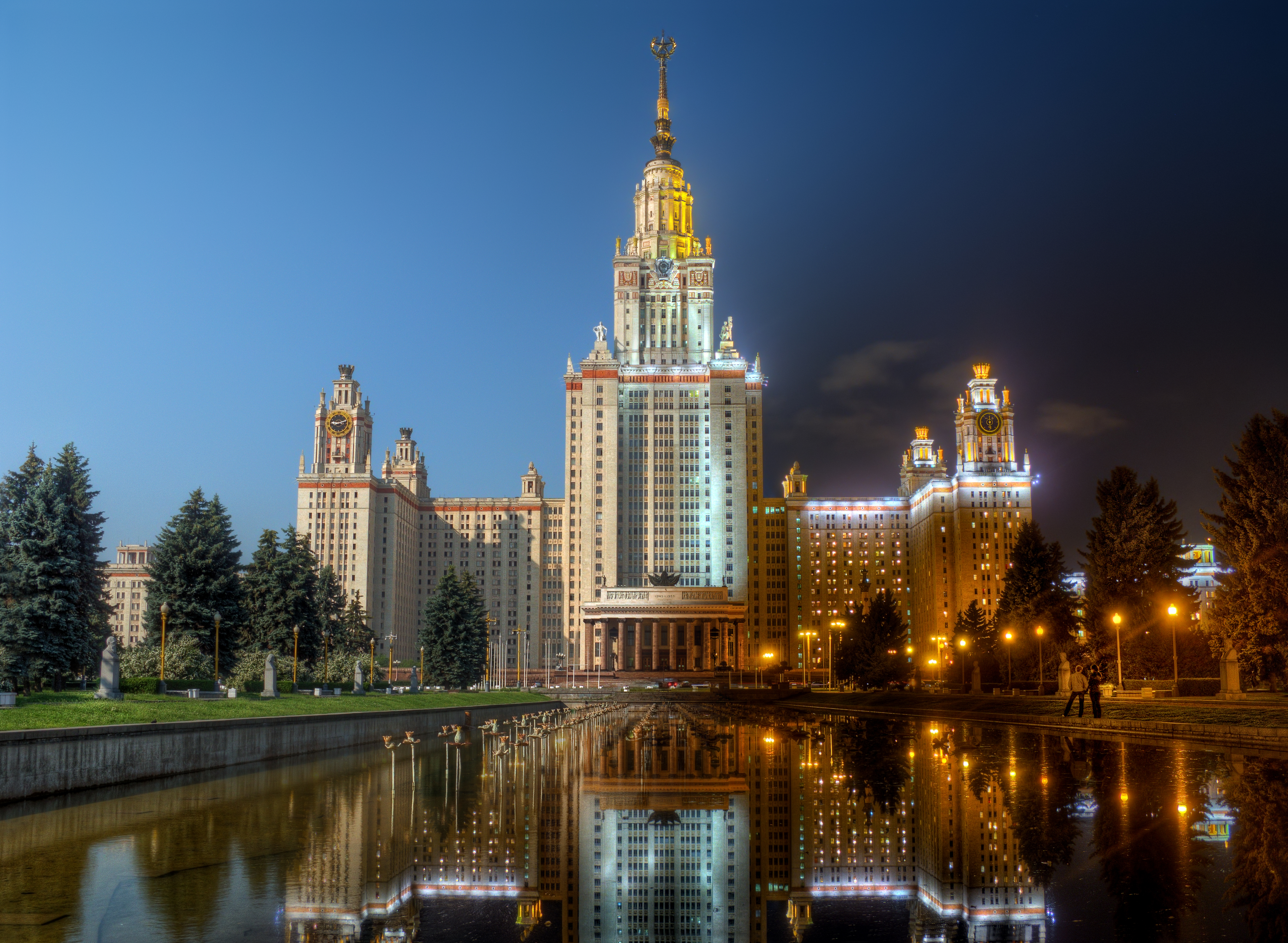
Main building of Moscow State University, designed by Lev Rudnev who died in 1956 and under copyright when freedom of panorama for architecture was introduced in Russia in 2014

Freedom of panorama was partially adopted in Russia on October 1, 2014, after intense lobbying by Russian Wikipedia members.

- The new law directly recognizes free licenses which are the basis of projects like Wikipedia. Authors of free content also have legal protection from misuse of their works.
- Now it is allowed to take and use photos in any public space. The photographers are no more formally offenders, as before when nobody was allowed to sell postcards with modern buildings without the permission of the architect or his successors.
- Monuments are still not covered by the introduced amendments.

=== Central America ===
The majority of Spanish-speaking countries in Central America do not allow broad freedom of panorama. The copyright laws of Guatemala, Honduras, and Nicaragua only permit personal uses of pictorial representations of public art permanently found on streets, squares, and other types of public spaces as well as exteriors of architectural works. Article 71 of the Costa Rican copyright law allows taking photographs of public art like monuments and statues in public spaces but only for non-commercial purposes.

There are no non-commercial or personal-use-only restrictions imposed on the freedom of panorama provisions of the copyright laws of El Salvador and Panama.

Section 78 of the Copyright Act of Belize explicitly permits representing works of architecture, sculpture, and artistic craftsmanship in paintings, photographs, films, or broadcasts, as long as these are permanently seen in public spaces or publicly-accessible premises.

=== OAPI member states ===
Freedom of panorama is restricted within Organisation Africaine de la Propriété Intellectuelle (OAPI), which consists of Benin, Burkina Faso, Cameroon, Central African Republic, Chad, Comoros, Congo, Ivory Coast, Equatorial Guinea, Gabon, Guinea, Guinea-Bissau, Mali, Mauritania, Niger, Senegal, and Togo. In accordance with the Annex VII, Part I, Article 16 of the Bangui Agreement, it is allowed to share or distribute images of architecture, fine arts, photographs, or applied art permanently located in public spaces, but not for commercial purposes if those become main subjects of the images.

=== Algeria ===
Algeria's Ordinance No. 03-05 of July 19, 2003, on Copyright and Related Rights provides for a freedom of panorama clause under Article 50. Accordingly, it is allowed to reproduce images of works of architecture, fine arts, applied arts, and photography that are permanently located in public places, except those that are found within art galleries, museums, and "classified cultural and natural sites".

=== Australia ===
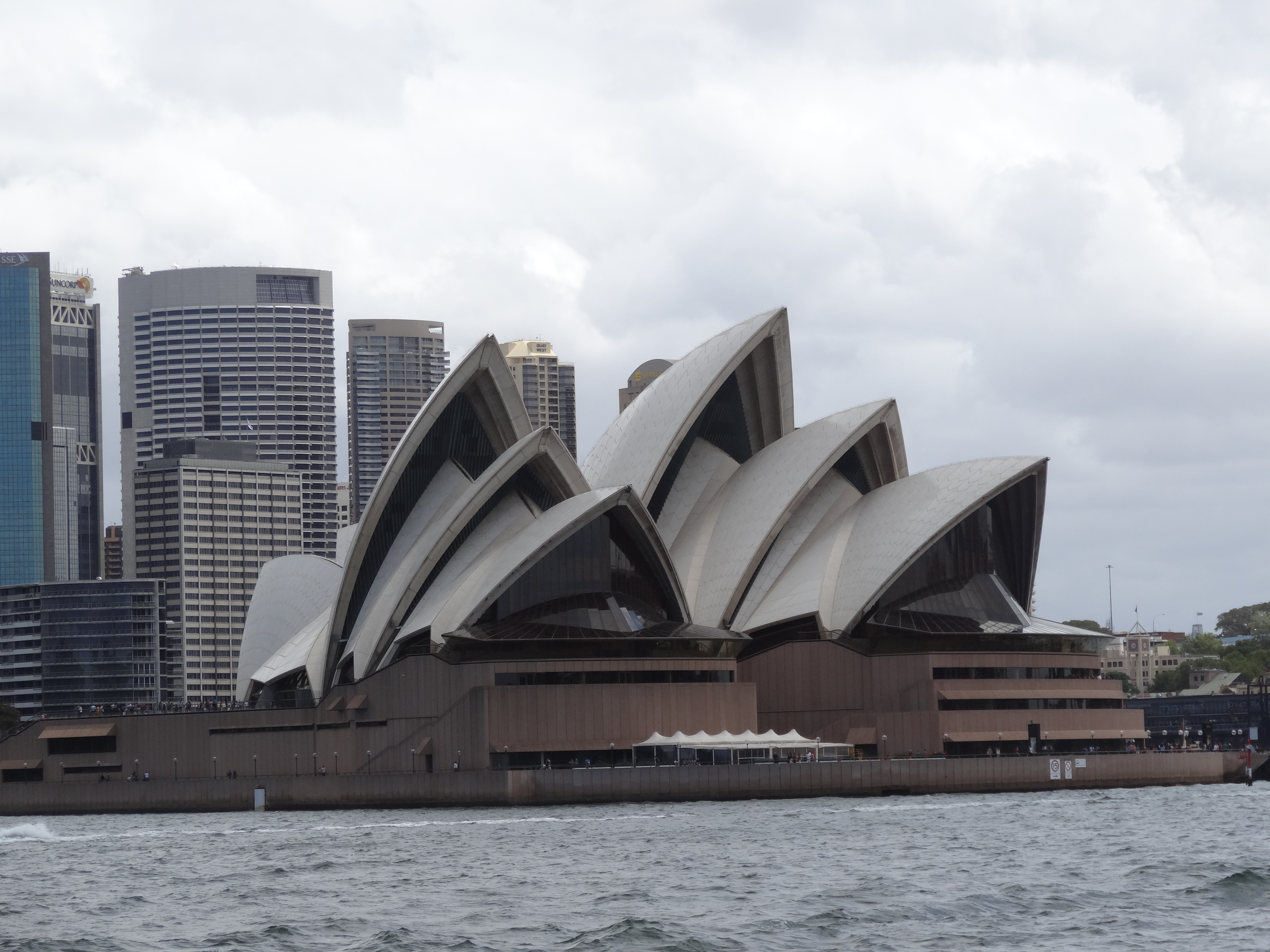
Sydney Opera House, designed by Danish architect Jørn Utzon

In Australia, freedom of panorama is dealt with in the federal Copyright Act 1968, sections 65 to 68. Section 65 provides: "The copyright in a work ... that is situated, otherwise than temporarily, in a public place, or in premises open to the public, is not infringed by the making of a painting, drawing, engraving or photograph of the work or by the inclusion of the work in a cinematograph film or in a television broadcast". This applies to any "artistic work" as defined in paragraph (c) of section 10: a "work of artistic craftsmanship" (but not a circuit layout). Section 66 of the Act provides exceptions to infringement of copyright in buildings and models of buildings by including the buildings in photos and depictions.

There is no right to reproduce artistic works outside the ambit of these provisions. This means that reproduction of "street art" can potentially infringe copyright.

Several artists' groups have criticized the Australian freedom of panorama, with respect to sculptures and works of artistic craftsmanship, claiming that free shooting of such works in public spaces "conflicts with the normal exploitation rights of the artist by allowing others to freely exploit their work". According to the Arts Law Centre, this "is unfair on artists who produce works for public display", since the artists receive only low median incomes from commissions. They add that Section 65 is disadvantageous to Indigenous peoples of the country by discouraging them from permanently showcasing their works in public spaces, as any free use leads to "irreparable cultural harm". They have proposed that the freedom of panorama provision be either abolished or modified so as to limit it to non-commercial uses.

=== Bahrain ===
The copyright law of Bahrain, Legislative Decree No. 22 of 2006, does not provide freedom of panorama. Article 25 states that works of architecture, sculptures, fine arts, and applied arts permanently installed in public spaces can be freely transmitted "through radio broadcasts for non-commercial purposes."

=== Bangladesh ===
Freedom of panorama ceased to exist in the country when the modernized Copyright Act 2023 came into effect. The repealed Copyright Act 2000 permitted creating images of architecture, sculptures, and works of artistic craftsmanship located in public places and premises. However, the new copyright act does not include this legal right. Instead, it contains a fair use provision modeled after the United States fair use system, requiring uses of copyrighted works to satisfy four fair use factors.

=== Brazil ===
A freedom of panorama provision is provided at Article 48 of the Brazilian copyright law. It states that "works permanently located in public places may be freely represented through paintings, drawings, photographs, and audiovisual processes."

=== Canada ===
Section 32.2(1) of the Copyright Act (Canada) states the following:

It is not an infringement of copyright

(b) for any person to reproduce, in a painting, drawing, engraving, photograph or cinematographic work
(i) an architectural work, provided the copy is not in the nature of an architectural drawing or plan, or
(ii) a sculpture or work of artistic craftsmanship or a cast or model of a sculpture or work of artistic craftsmanship, that is permanently situated in a public place or building;

The Copyright Act also provides specific protection for the incidental inclusion of another work seen in the background of a photo. Photos that "incidentally and not deliberately" include another work do not infringe copyright.

=== China ===
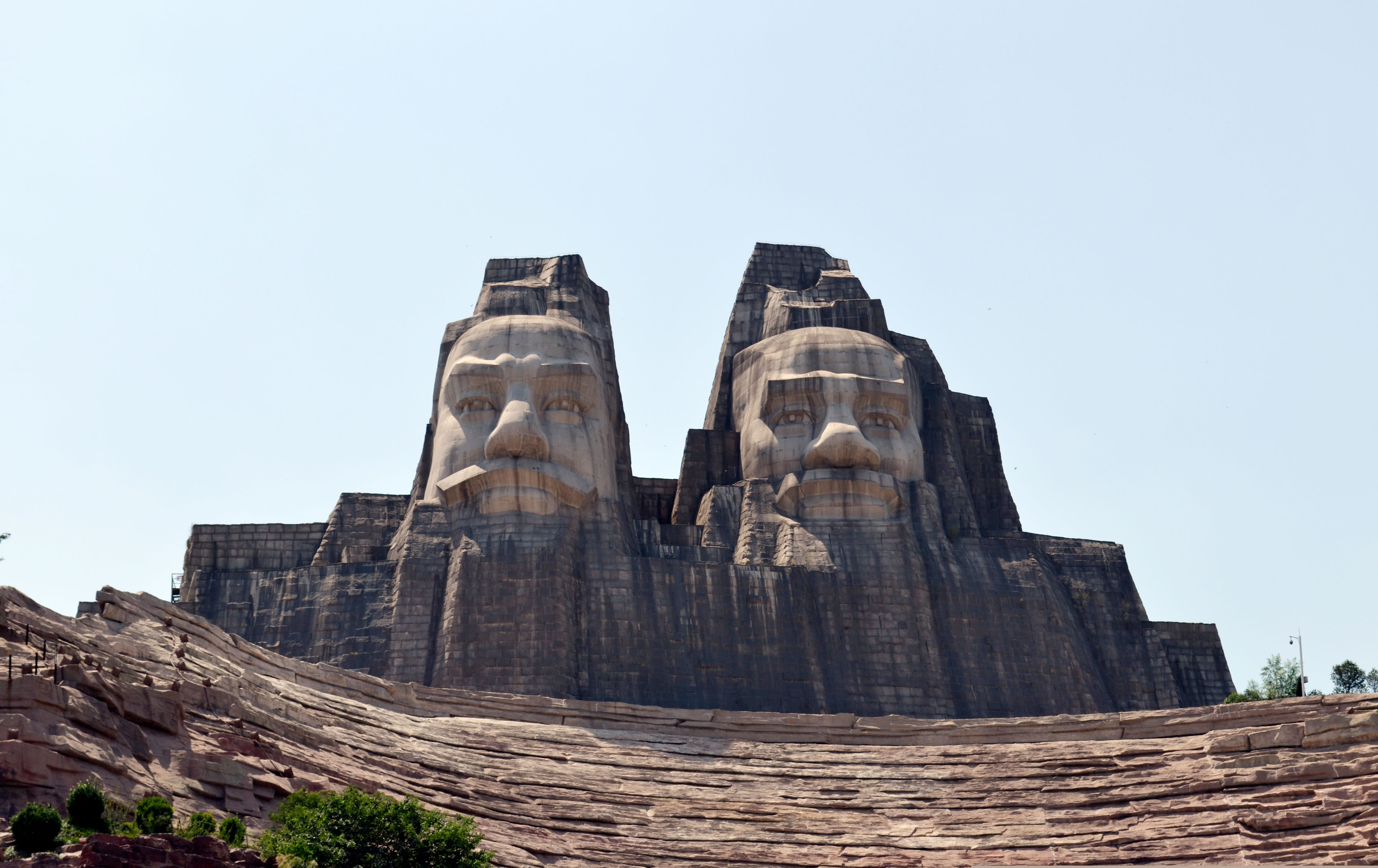
Emperors Yan and Huang monument in Zhengzhou, designed by Wu Shuhua and completed in 2007

Article 24(10) of the copyright law of China provides a sufficient freedom of panorama provision. Accordingly, it is allowed to exploit an artistic work "located or on display in a public place" by means of drawing, photography, or videography without permission from and remuneration to the copyright holder, "provided that the name of the author and the title of the work shall be mentioned."

The Several Issues Concerning the Application of Law in the Trial of Civil Copyright Dispute Cases, released by the Supreme People's Court in 2026, states that the public can freely use works of art in public places "in a reasonable manner and within a reasonable scope in accordance with law". However, it cautions that the resulting derivatives should not be publicly distributed "in the same manner as the original artwork".

Because of relevant provisions under One country, two systems, the said exception does not apply to both Hong Kong and Macau.

==== Hong Kong and Macau ====
Section 71 of Hong Kong's Copyright Ordinance (Chapter 528) allows for representations sculptures and works of artistic craftsmanship "permanently situated in public place or in premises open to the public" and buildings through drawings, paintings, photographs, films, and broadcasting, and considers making copies of representations of such works as not infringing the copyright of such works.

Section 61(l) of Macau's Decree-Law No. 43/99/M of August 16, 1999, on the Regime of Copyright and Related Rights permits photographic, videographic, and cinematographic representations of artistic works situated in public places.

=== Colombia ===
Under Article 39 of the copyright law of Colombia, reproductions through photography and cinematography of works "permanently placed in public roads, streets, or squares" are allowed, as well as the distribution and communication to the public of such images. It is also only applicable to the "exterior appearance" in the case of architectural works.

=== Democratic Republic of the Congo ===
Freedom of panorama is very limited in the copyright law of the Democratic Republic of the Congo. Article 28 permits photography, cinematography, and television broadcasting of architecture, though photos of such works can only be legally used in newspapers, journals, and school textbooks. Article 29, which deals with "figurative works of art that are permanently located in a public place," only allows representations of such works through film and television programs.

=== Iceland ===
Icelandic copyright law does not provide full freedom of panorama. Article 16 permits photography and presentation of resulting images of buildings and public art outdoors, but if these became the main subjects of the images and the images are used commercially, the authors of buildings and public art are "entitled for remuneration". Such mandatory payment is not required if the user is a newspaper publisher or a television broadcaster. Then-US Register of Copyrights Ralph Oman took note of this restrictive right concerning pictures of buildings in the 1980s..

=== India ===
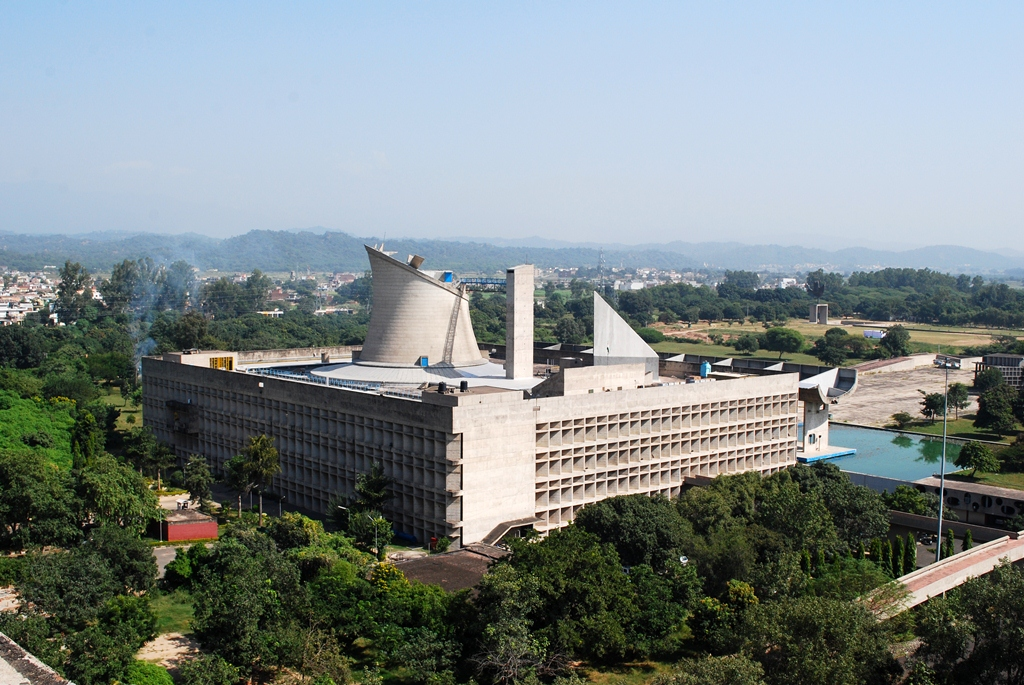
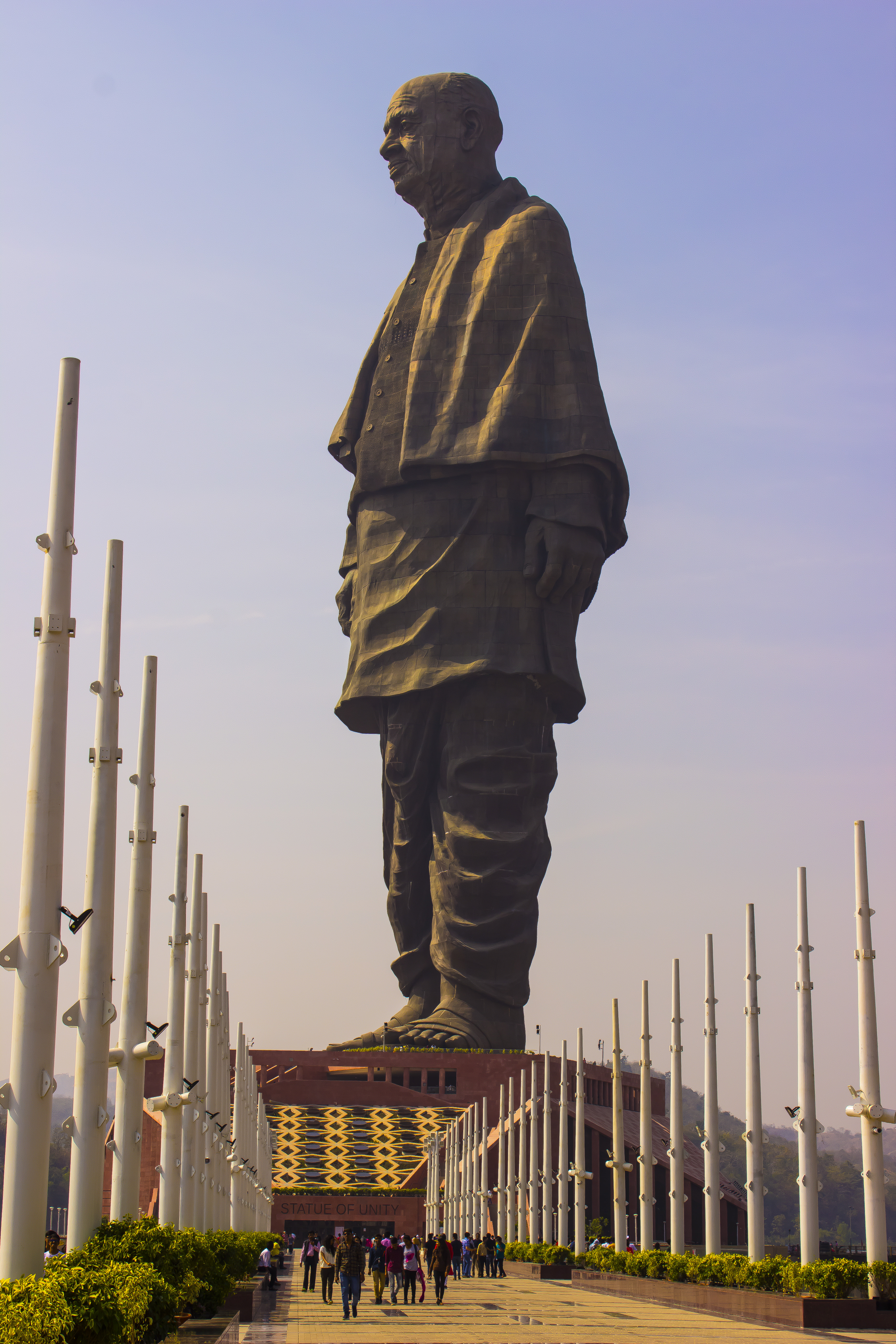
Left: The Palace of Assembly in Chandigarh, authored by Le Corbusier. It has been a UNESCO World Heritage Site since 2016. Right: Statue of Unity, the world's tallest statue, was completed in 2018 and authored by sculptor Ram V. Sutar.

Freedom of panorama is dealt with in sections 52, s–u(i) of the copyright law of India. Both (s) and (t) of section 52 applies to depictions of architecture, sculptures, and works of artistic craftsmanship through drawing, painting, engraving, and photography, while (u)(i) applies to inclusion of all types of artistic works in films. These provisions are applicable if the work is "permanently situate in a public place or any premises to which the public has access." (u)(ii) is for the incidental cinematographic inclusion of works not located in public spaces.

The case The Daily Calendar Supplying v. The United Concern (1958) concerned the Daily Calendar Supplying Bureau's commercial distributions of slightly modified reproductions of an oil painting of Lord Subramania by the firm United Concern. The firm acquired artistic property rights over the painting from its artist T. M. Subramaniam, soon after the artistic work was created in 1947. The user was ordered to pay 1,000 rupees worth of copyright damage to the firm. The Madras High Court rejected the argument of the Daily Calendar Supplying in their 1964 appeal, that their act falls under Section 52(t), since the original painting was still under the artist's private custody even if free copies were already being distributed to several temples in the south. This distribution is "not tantamount to his installing his original work in a public place."

The Delhi High Court is expected to hear a recent case from February 2023, concerning Acko General Insurance's exploitation of Humanity mural painted on a Mumbai building, in their advertising campaign, that prompted St+Art India Foundation and the mural author Paola Delfin Gaytan to send a legal notice urging the firm to take down both the billboard material and the social media posts of their campaign. Acko, in turn, denied copyright infringement and claimed their use is covered by freedom of panorama as the work is "permanently situated in a public place to which the public has access." The court, having said in a November 10 order that the billboard was "clearly an advertisement", will hear the case in February 2024, while ordering the firm to delete all online posts with the presence of the artwork.

=== Indonesia ===
Freedom of panorama does not exist in the copyright law of Indonesia, according to Creative Commons Indonesia. A close provision is found at Article 43(d), which permits the "creation and dissemination of copyrighted content through information and communication technology media that is non-commercial and/or lucrative to the creator or related parties, or if the creator declares no objection to the creation and dissemination."

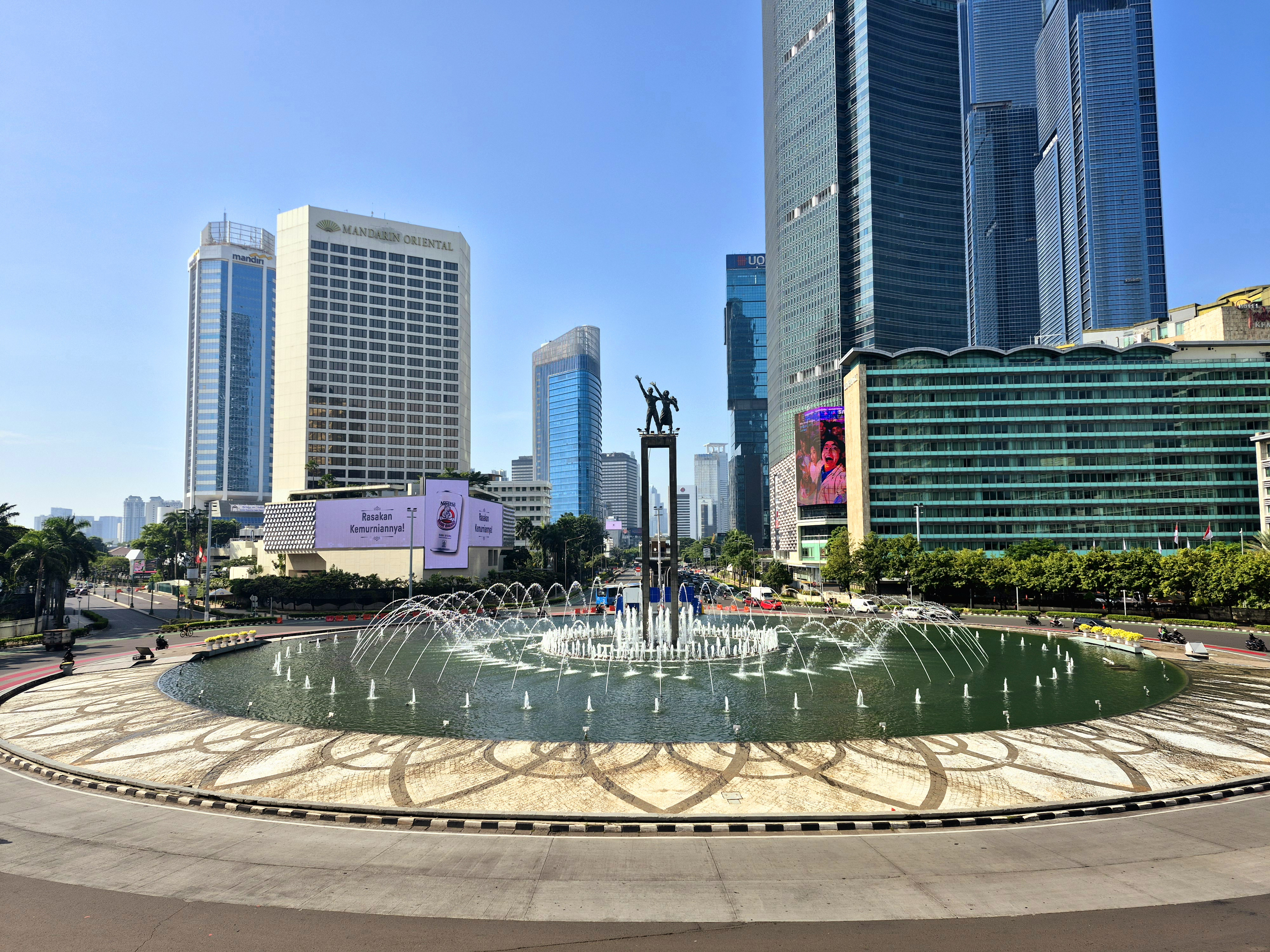
Portion of the cityscape of Jakarta. The Selamat Datang Monument is visible in the background.

On December 2, 2020, the Central Jakarta District Court declared that the Grand Indonesia mall infringed on the copyright subsisting on Selamat Datang Monument when the retailer used a silhouette version of it as the main design of their 2004 logo. The copyright is held by the heirs of the principal designer, Henk Ngantung, who was the deputy governor of Jakarta when he was designing the monument. The court rejected the retailer's argument that the copyright claim of the late designer's heirs was invalid due to the ineligibility of the designer's copyright since he was a government official and that the heirs only registered the copyright in 2010, despite the monument being unveiled in 1962. The mall was to pay Rp 1 billion in compensation to the designer's heirs, and they replaced the logo after the ruling. Ngantung's heirs filed another complaint in January 2025, this time against KFC Indonesia for the usage of the image of the same monument in their 43rd anniversary bucket packaging. The court ruled the fastfood chain infringed on the copyright and demanded them to pay Ngantung's heirs Rp 2.83 billion (equivalent to US$170,000), though the case is still pending due to KFC's appeal.

=== Israel ===
Israeli freedom of panorama is found at Section 23 of the Copyright Law, 5768–2007 (as amended on July 28, 2011), which states that it is permitted to visually represent works of architecture, sculpture, and applied art through drawing, sketching, photography, and broadcasting, if the said works are "permanently situated in a public place."

=== Ivory Coast ===
Freedom of panorama is not recognized in Ivory Coast. Under Article 27 of the Law No. 2016-555 of July 26, 2016, it is allowed to reproduce images of works of architecture, plastic art, and graphic art which have been completed, only for the following conditions:

1. Reproduction of the said works through printed, audio-visual, or online media, only for informatory purpose.
2. Reproduction of images of works of art that are intended to appear in the catalogues of lawful sale of artworks within the country, only for the purpose of describing the said works.
3. Reproduction through audio-visual media of the said works if permanently located in public spaces, only if the said works are shown in an incidental or accessory manner.

The provision adds that all of these uses must be of non-commercial nature: "Any exploitation for profit of the reproductions mentioned in this article is subject to the prior authorization of the author."

=== Japan ===
The copyright law of Japan provides for a limited freedom of panorama for outdoor artistic works and full freedom of panorama for buildings. Article 46 of the Copyright Act (Act No. 48 of May 6, 1970, as amended 2020) allows for exploitations of reproductions of artistic works "permanently installed in an outdoor location" and architectural works for any purposes, but in the case of artistic works, this right does not apply if the reproduction is made "for the purpose of selling copies of it, or selling those copies." Article 48 obliges the users of images of such works to mention the source if provided and in accordance with the common practice.

The 2003 ruling of the Osaka District Court states that "architectural works" protected under this law only includes buildings with distinct aesthetic and creative properties. There are also legal interpretations which hold that the Tower of the Sun in Suita, Osaka Prefecture must be classified as an artistic work rather than an architectural work. This means any images of this landmark cannot be used commercially, even if there is full freedom of panorama for buildings in Japan.

=== Lebanon ===
Freedom of panorama in Lebanon is restricted to the publications of pictorial representations of architecture, visual arts, photographs, or applied art by the "media" only, in accordance with Article 31 of Law No. 75 of April 3, 1999, on the Protection of Literary and Artistic Property.

=== Malaysia ===
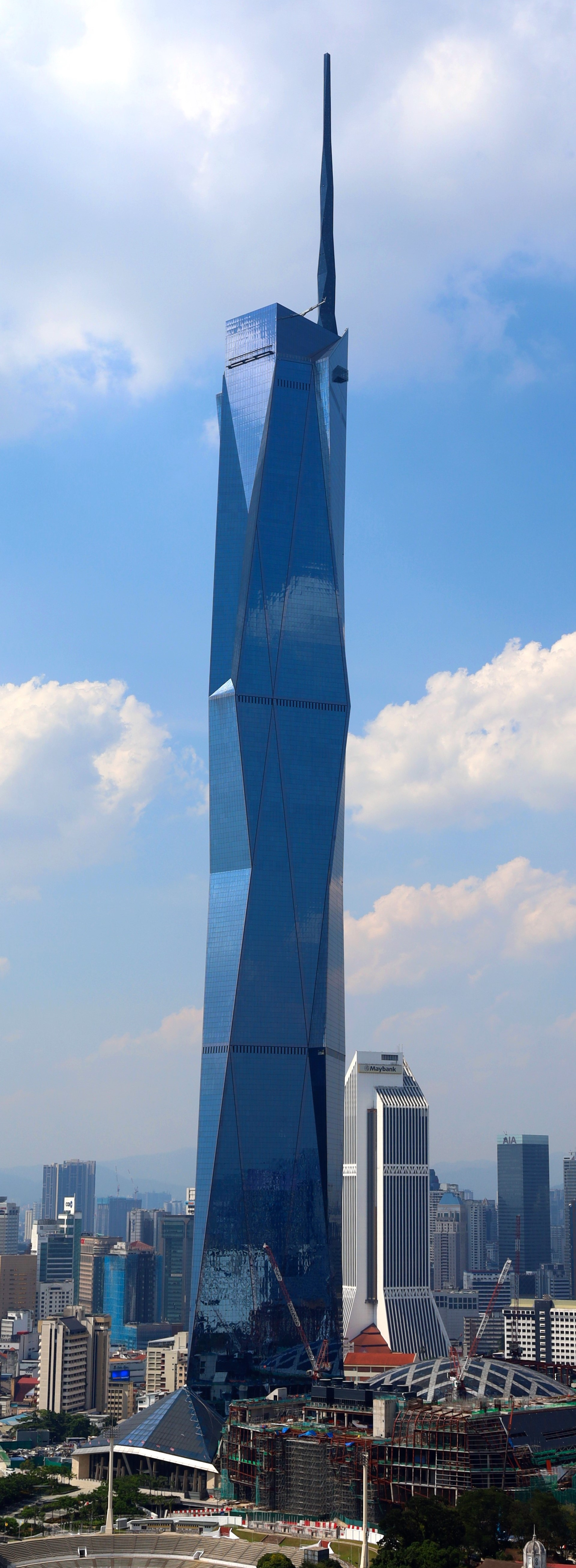
Merdeka 118 in Kuala Lumpur, designed by Fender Katsalidis Architects

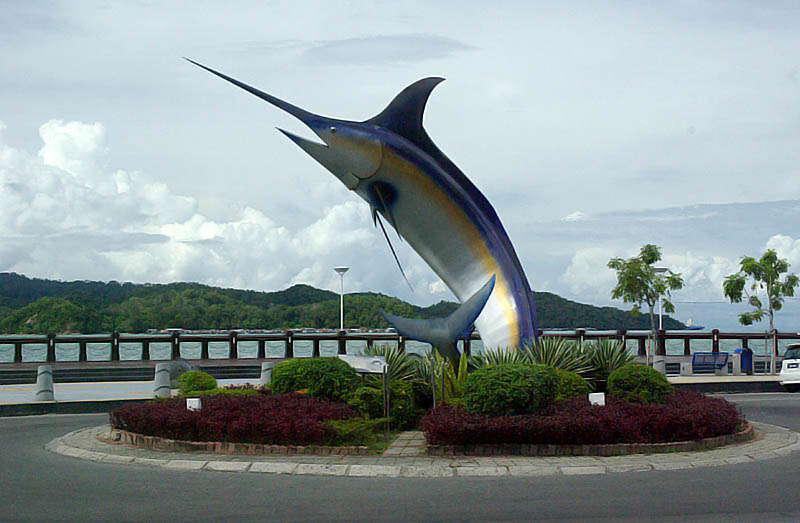
Marlin Statue in Kota Kinabalu

Under Section 13(2) of the Copyright Act 1987 (as last amended in 2022), the right to control does not include:

(c) the inclusion in a film or broadcast of any artistic work situated in a place where it can be viewed by the public;

(d) the reproduction and distribution of copies of any artistic work permanently situated in a place where it can be viewed by the public;

"Artistic work" is defined at Section 3(f) as encompassing works of architecture, models of architecture, sculptures, graphic works, and works of artistic craftsmanship, but explicitly excludes layout designs.

=== Mexico ===
The copyright law of Mexico provides for a freedom of panorama provision at Article 148(VII):

Article 148. - Literary and artistic works that have already been disclosed may only be used in the following cases without the consent of the owner of the economic rights and without remuneration, provided that the normal exploitation of the work is not adversely affected thereby and provided also that the source is invariably mentioned and that no alteration is made to the work:

VII. Reproduction, communication and distribution by means of drawings, paintings, photographs and audiovisual processes of works that are visible from public places.

=== Morocco ===
The Moroccan copyright law does not provide full freedom of panorama. The relevant provision at Section 20 only allows republication, broadcasting, and communication to public of images of architecture, works of fine art, photographic works, and works applied art permanently situated in publicly-open place, if the depicted work is not the main subject. If it becomes the main subject, the reproduction should not be used commercially.

On December 12, 1955, the Court of Appeal of Rabat ruled that "the fact of building or placing an architectural work in a public place does not in itself imply any loss of artistic property rights."

=== Namibia ===
The Copyright and Neighbouring Rights Protection Act, 1994 (Act 6 of 1994) does not give complete freedom of panorama. Section 18(1)(b) only permits the presentation of artistic works "permanently situated in a street, square or a similar public place" in cinematograph films or in television broadcasts.

=== New Zealand ===
Under the Copyright Act (1994) of New Zealand, exemptions exist for free sharing of photographs of certain works like sculptures, but none for graphic works like murals and street art, even if these are located in public spaces. This means permission from the artists or whoever is the copyright holder is required to freely take photographs of such graphic works for sharing purposes, especially with commercial intent. However, this restriction is largely ignored, as evidenced by tourists' continued sharing of such images on social media and marketing companies' utilizations of copyrighted graphic works as background elements in advertisements. In 2019, artist Xoë Hall expressed her indignation over Whitcoulls's use of images of her Wellington mural in their calendars, and suggested her peer muralists in New Zealand "have a contract for every wall they paint, stating who owns the copyright, and to include that in the mural with the artist's name."

=== Nigeria ===
Under Section 20(1)(e) of the Nigerian Copyright Act (2022), freedom of panorama is restricted to "the inclusion in an audiovisual work or a broadcast of an artistic work situated in a place where it can be viewed by the public." Free use of public space is only permitted to audio-visual media, and photographs of copyrighted public art cannot be used for commercial purpose, though uses in education and research are permitted.

=== North Korea ===
There is an adequate freedom of panorama provision under the copyright law of North Korea. Article 32(8) states that permission from copyright holders is not required for reproduction of artistic works "installed in public places".

=== Norway ===
Section 31 of the 2018 Norwegian copyright law grants restricted freedom of panorama for artistic works permanently situated in public spaces, permitting only non-commercial reproductions if the works become main subjects of depictions. However, architecture can be freely depicted regardless of intent.

=== Pakistan ===
The copyright law of Pakistan grants freedom of panorama under Section 57. Both (r) and (s) of section 57 applies to depictions of architecture, sculptures, and works of artistic craftsmanship through drawing, painting, engraving, and photography, while (t)(i) applies to cinematographic inclusion of all types of artistic works. These provisions are applicable if the work is "permanently situated in a public place or any premises to which the public has access." (t)(ii) is for the incidental cinematographic inclusion of artistic works not located in public spaces.

=== Paraguay ===
Under Article 39(4) of Paraguay's copyright act, it is permitted to reproduce public art "permanently displayed in streets, squares, or other public places" using a method different from the method used in creating the original, as well as the exterior façades of buildings, provided that the author's name is cited for works with known authors, and the title and physical location of the work are mentioned. This and other limitations to copyright under the same article are subject to the Berne three-step test, directly incorporated as a common provision: "Permitted reproductions under this article will be allowed as long as they do not violate the normal exploitation of the work or cause unjustified harm to the legitimate interests of the author".

=== Philippines ===
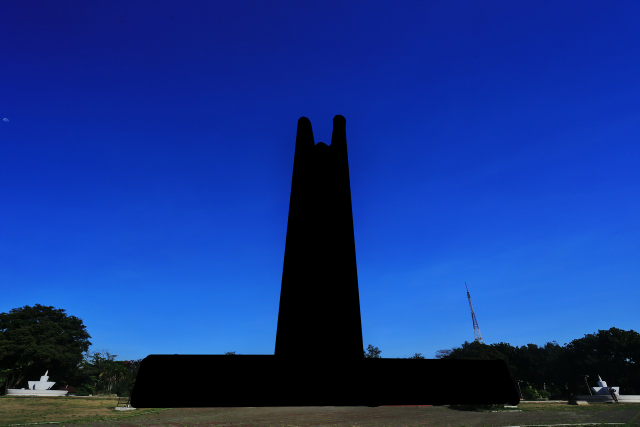
Censored image of Federico Ilustre's Quezon Memorial Shrine, as a result of the absence of FoP exception in the Philippines

The Intellectual property Code of the Philippines (Republic Act No. 8923) makes no specific provision for freedom of panorama. A very limited provision does exists at Section 184(d) which states "the reproduction and communication to the public of literary, scientific or artistic works as part of reports of current events by means of photography, cinematography or broadcasting to the extent necessary for the purpose."

This makes commercial uses of public buildings and monuments potentially infringing the copyrights subsisting in the said works; for example, shooting a video of a public space with a building authored by an architect who is a National Artist, and selling the said video to Netflix.

In the 19th Congress of the Philippines, Representative Christopher de Venecia of Pangasinan filed House Bill No. 2672. It included a freedom of panorama as the new Section 184(m) of the Intellectual Property Code. Senator Loren Legarda filed a similar bill with freedom of panorama provision in the Senate during the same Congress. Both bills remained pending up to the end of the Congress.

=== Rwanda ===
Freedom of panorama is not granted in Rwanda. Under Article 298 of their 2024 copyright law, images of works of architecture, applied art, and photography that are permanently found in public spaces can be reproduced and broadcast to public, but "if the image of the work is the main subject of such reproduction, broadcast or communication and if it is used for commercial purposes, consent and payment of royalties are required."

=== Singapore ===
The copyright law of Singapore guarantees sufficient freedom of panorama, under Section 265, permitting the making and publishing of images of buildings, models of buildings, sculptures, and works of artistic craftsmanship, if the images were made on or after April 10, 1987.

=== South Africa ===
The copyright law of South Africa does not grant freedom of panorama. An exception is provided at Section 15(3) for artistic works permanently situated in public places, but only limits to "reproduction or inclusion in a cinematograph film or a television broadcast or transmission in a diffusion service." The "diffusion service" is defined in Section 1(1) as "a telecommunication service of transmissions consisting of sounds, images, signs or signals, which takes place over wires or other paths provided by material substance and intended for reception by specific members of the public;...and where sounds, images, signs or signals are displayed or emitted by any receiving apparatus to which they are conveyed by diffusion in such manner as to constitute a performance or a causing of sounds, images, signs or signals to be seen or heard in public, this shall be deemed to be effected by the operation of the receiving apparatus."

=== South Korea ===
A freedom of panorama provision is provided at Article 35 of the South Korean copyright law, but is restricted to non-commercial purposes only. The provision states that works of art, buildings, and photographs that are permanently situated in open places can be exploited for any purposes, except in cases:

"Where a building is reproduced into another building;"
"Where a sculpture or painting is reproduced into another sculpture or painting;"
"Where the reproduction is made in order to exhibit permanently at an open place;"
"Where the reproduction is made for the purpose of selling its copies."

There was a case in 2008 which concerned an advertisement company's unauthorized use of a building in advertisements. Pomato Co., Ltd. used architect Min Gyu-am's "UV House", located in Paju, by their inclusion of the building as the background element of a 2005 television and Internet advertisement for the Kookmin Bank. The architect received a rental fee for the place, but he did not grant permission to use its copyright. After the advertisements were released, the architect said they used the architectural work without his permission, so he claims for damages. In the first trial, the Seoul Central District Court judged that the appearance of the building used in the advertisements is small compared to the whole, so it cannot be seen as a copyright infringement. During the second trial, on November 7, 2008, both parties agreed to compensation payment. So with the completion of mediation, the second trial ended without a ruling.

Commercial use of images of the statues of Admiral Yi Sun-sin and King Sejong at Gwanghwamun Square in Seoul, like in advertising and commercial photography, requires prior approval from the Korea Data Agency (K-DATA) and payment of royalties. This is part of an agreement between Seoul Metropolitan Government and the rightsholders of the monument: sculptor Kim Yeong-won, who authored the statue of King Sejong, and Kim Namjo, widow of the sculptor who authored the statue of Yi Sun-sin, coinciding with the registration of the statues with the Korea Copyright Commission. The royalty payments are directed to "social welfare and homeland projects according to the wishes of the copyright holders." No permission is required for personal commemorative photographs. Since 2013, all licensing management has been transferred to the Korean Culture and Information Service (KOCIS) of the Ministry of Culture, Sports and Tourism, revoking K-DATA's role in public copyright trust management services.

=== Sri Lanka ===
The Intellectual Property Act, No. 36 of 2003 does not contain a freedom of panorama provision in the list of limitations to copyright at Section 12. The law repealed the Code of Intellectual Property Act No. 52 of 1979, which had a limited freedom of panorama provision at Section 13(d) that granted filmmakers and television broadcasters the right to reproduce works of art and architecture "permanently located in a place where they can be viewed by the public."

=== Switzerland ===
Freedom of panorama is regulated in article 27 of the Swiss Urheberrechtsgesetz, which states that works permanently situated on public grounds can be visually represented for any purposes, provided that the representation is not in three-dimensional form and cannot be used "for the same purpose as the original."

=== Taiwan ===
Article 58 of the Copyright Act of Taiwan provides for a freedom of panorama exception, wherein architectural and artistic works "displayed on a long-term basis" in outdoor places open to the public may be exploited for any purposes. This does not apply if the reproduction of artistic works is purely for the purpose of selling copies.

The restricted freedom of panorama for artistic works was affirmed in 2022 correspondences from the Intellectual Property Office of the Ministry of Economic Affairs, in clarifying the non-commercial restriction of the Taiwanese freedom of panorama for non-architectural works. Nevertheless, commercial media like post cards that only show the artistic works incidentally, like in the background, are permissible.

=== Tanzania ===
Section 12(6) of the 1999 copyright act of Tanzania only grants the reproduction of architecture and artworks permanently situated in public places "in audio-visual or video recordings", while section 26(d) of the same law only allows "incidental utilization" of objects containing expressions of folklore in photographs, films, and broadcasts, if those objects are permanently placed in public places.

=== Thailand ===
Freedom of panorama is dealt with in Sections 37–39 of the copyright law of Thailand. Sections 37 and 38 allow representations through "drawing, painting, construction, engraving, molding, carving, lithographing, photographing, cinematographing, and video broadcasting" of artistic works in public places and architecture, while Section 39 allows pictorial and videographic representations of "a work of which an artistic work is a component."

=== Turkey ===
Under article 40 of the copyright law of Turkey:

Works of fine arts permanently placed on public streets, avenues or squares may be reproduced by drawings, graphics, photographs and the like, distributed, shown by projection in public premises or broadcast by radio or similar means. For architectural works, this freedom is only valid for the exterior form.

— 5846/1951 Article 40

=== Uganda ===
Freedom of panorama is granted in Uganda under Section 15(1)(f) of The Copyright and Neighbouring Rights Act, 2006, which states that architectural or artistic works permanently located in a public place can be reproduced and communicated to public through photography, audiovisual works, and television broadcasting. Under Section 2 of the law, "public place" is broadly defined as "any building, or conveyance to which for the time being the public are entitled or permitted to have access, with or without payment," ranging from cinemas and restaurants to sports facilities and resorts.

=== United Arab Emirates ===
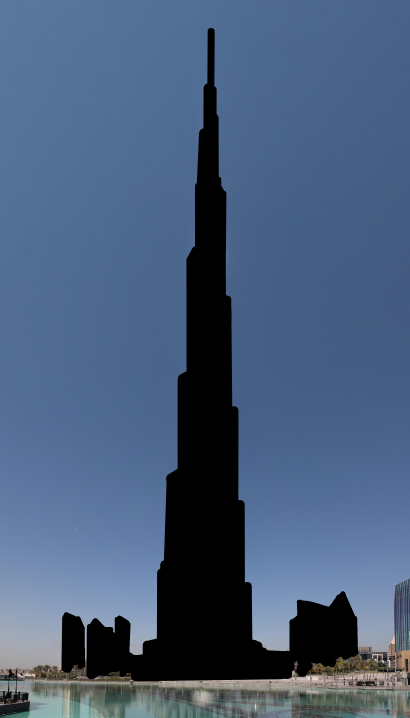
Censored image of the Burj Khalifa due to the FoP exception being restricted to broadcasts

Article 22(7) of the Federal Law No. 38 of 2021 on Copyrights and Neighboring Rights does not grant freedom of panorama. It only permits exhibitions of fine, applied, plastic, and architectural arts permanently located in public places "in broadcasts". Article 22(7) of the repealed Federal Law No. 7 of 2002 on Copyrights and Neighboring Rights gives similar restrictive legal right.

Protected works in the United Arab Emirates include the Burj Al Arab, the Burj Khalifa, and Sheikh Zayed Grand Mosque. Due to Wikimedia's stringent licensing rules, submitted images showing modern architecture without proper permissions were taken down at the end of the first edition of the Wiki Loves Emirates campaign in 2018.

=== United Kingdom ===
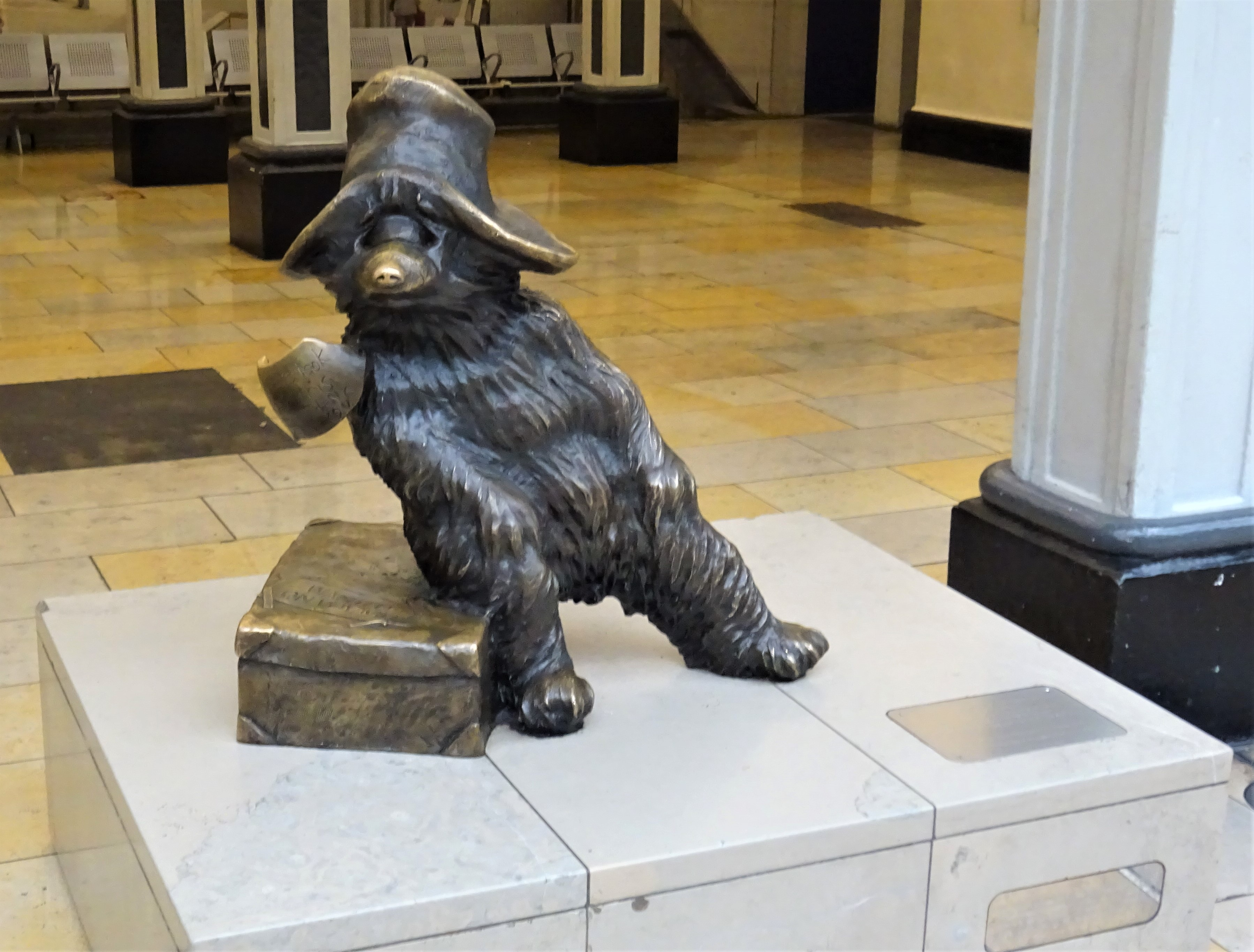
Paddington Bear statue at London Paddington station

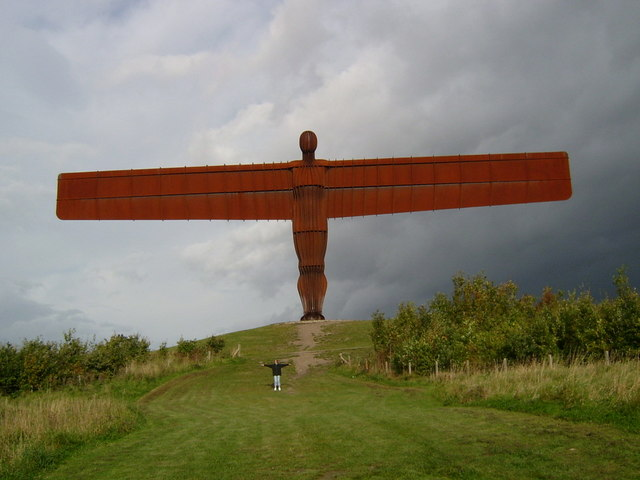
Angel of the North sculpture in Gateshead, Tyne and Wear

Under UK law, freedom of panorama covers all buildings as well as most three-dimensional works such as sculptures that are permanently situated in a public place. The freedom does not generally extend to two-dimensional copyright works such as murals or posters. A photograph which makes use of the freedom may be published in any way without breaching copyright.

Section 62 of the Copyright, Designs and Patents Act 1988 is broader than the corresponding provisions in many other countries, and allows photographers to take pictures of buildings, defined in section 4(2) as "any fixed structure, and a part of a building or fixed structure". There is no requirement that the building be in located a public place, nor does the freedom extend only to external views of the building.

Also allowed are photographs of certain artworks that are permanently situated in a public place or in premises open to the public, specifically sculptures, models for buildings, and "works of artistic craftsmanship". According to the standard reference work on copyright, Copinger and Skone James, the expression "open to the public" presumably includes premises to which the public are admitted only on licence or on payment. Again, this is broader than 'public place', which is the wording in many countries, and there is no restriction to works that are located outdoors.

Under the local approach to copyright, "works of artistic craftsmanship" are defined separately from "graphic works", and the freedom of section 62 does not apply to the latter. "Graphic works" are defined in section 4 as any painting, drawing, diagram, map, chart or plan, any engraving, etching, lithograph, woodcut or similar work. Accordingly, photographs may not freely be taken of artworks such as murals or posters even if they are permanently located in a public place.

The courts have not established a consistent test for what is meant by a "work of artistic craftsmanship", but Copinger suggests that the creator must be both a craftsman and an artist. Evidence of the intentions of the maker are relevant, and according to the House of Lords case of Hensher v Restawile [1976] AC 64, it is "relevant and important, although not a paramount or leading consideration" if the creator had the conscious purpose of creating a work of art. It is not necessary for the work to be describable as "fine art". In that case, some examples were given of typical articles that might be considered works of artistic craftsmanship, including hand-painted tiles, stained glass, wrought iron gates, and the products of high-class printing, bookbinding, cutlery, needlework and cabinet-making.

Other artworks cited by Copinger that have been held to fall under this definition include hand-knitted woollen sweaters, fabric with a highly textured surface including 3D elements, a range of pottery and items of dinnerware. The cases are, respectively, Bonz v Cooke [1994] 3 NZLR 216 (New Zealand), Coogi Australia v Hyrdrosport (1988) 157 ALR 247 (Australia), Walter Enterprises v Kearns (Zimbabwe) noted at [1990] 4 EntLR E-61, and Commissioner of Taxation v Murray (1990) 92 ALR 671 (Australia).

The Design and Artists Copyright Society and Artquest provide further information on UK freedom of panorama.

=== United States ===
United States copyright law contains the following provision, introduced by the Architectural Works Copyright Protection Act (AWCPA) of 1990:

The copyright in an architectural work that has been constructed does not include the right to prevent the making, distributing, or public display of pictures, paintings, photographs, or other pictorial representations of the work, if the building in which the work is embodied is located in or ordinarily visible from a public place.

— 17 U.S. Code § 120(a)

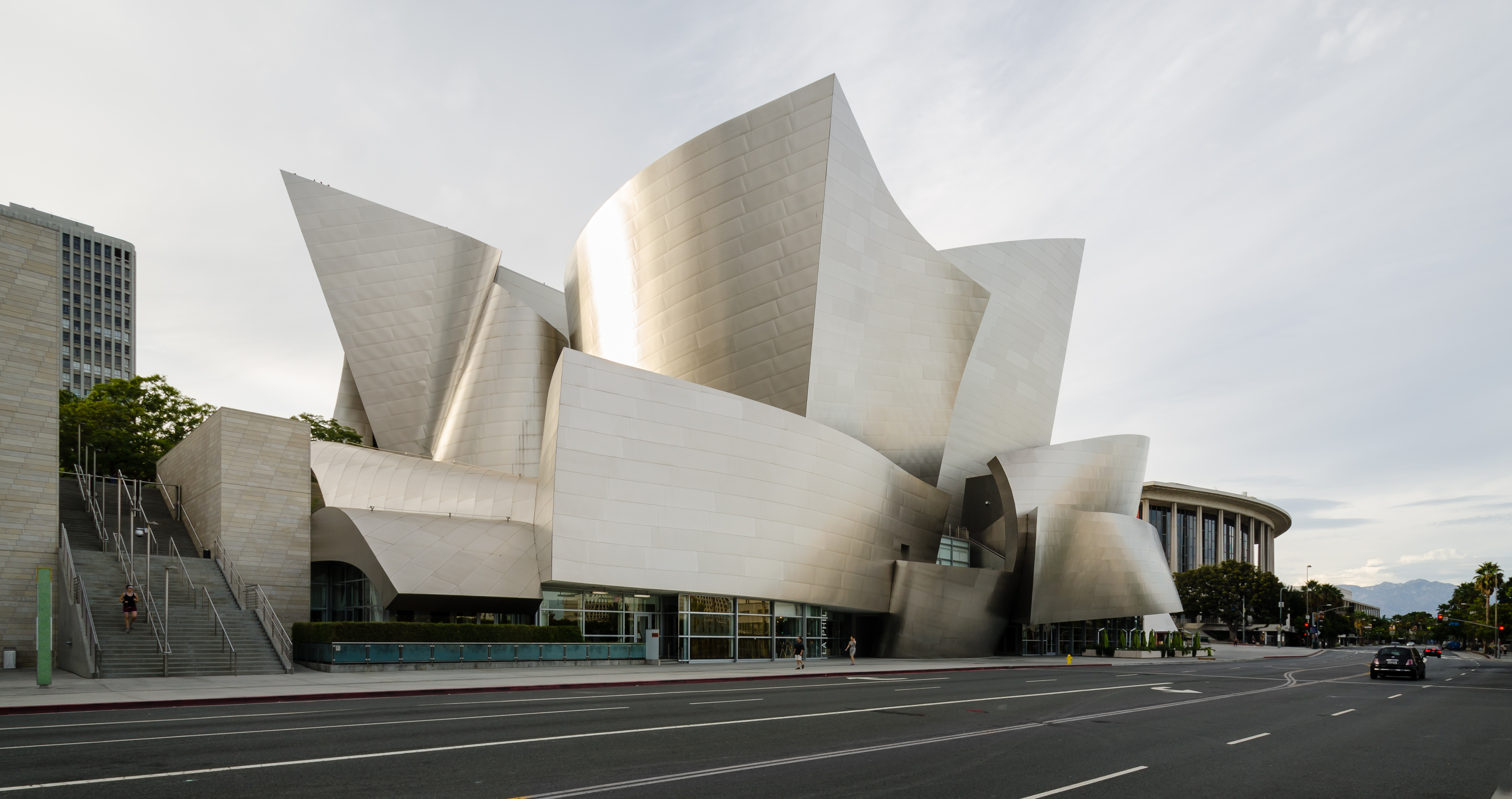
Frank Gehry's Walt Disney Concert Hall, completed in 2003

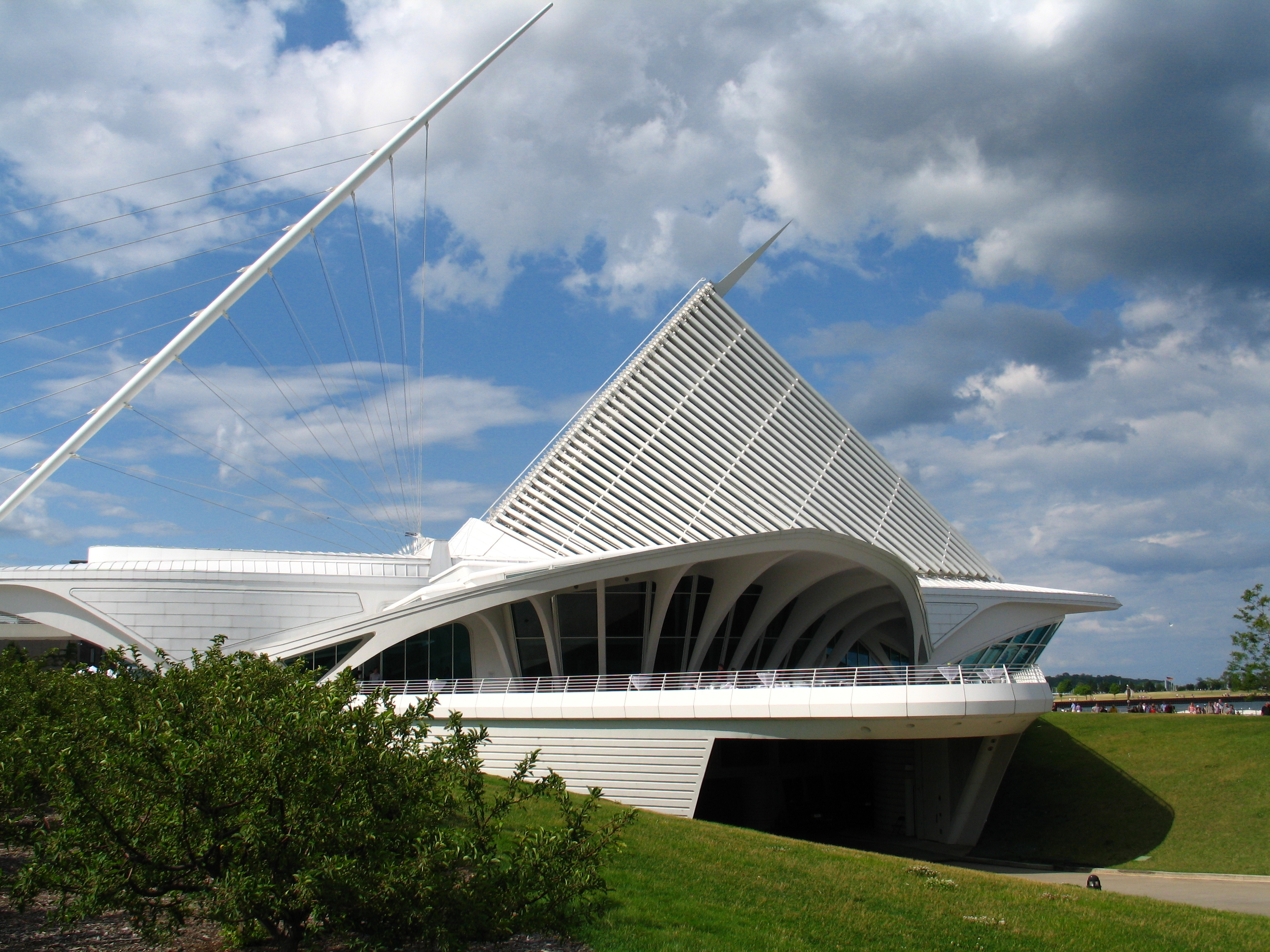
Quadracci Pavilion, a 2001 work of Santiago Calatrava, located within the Milwaukee Art Museum complex

==== Rationale and definition ====
The Committee Report 101-735 of the United States House of Representatives is of the view that the panorama exception does not breach the country's compliance to the Berne Convention, noting that several other signatories provide similar exceptions. A proposal from the American Institute of Architects (AIA) to restrict pictorial representations meant "to further the unauthorized design and construction of a substantially similar architectural work" was turned down, with the photographers' groups like the American Society of Magazine Photographers opposing the AIA proposal which they claimed as potentially "interfering with scholarly and noncompetitive analysis of architectural works, and with the ability of photographers to pursue their livelihood." Zimand (2024) mentions of a second suggestion from the AIA representative David Daileda to limit pictorial representations to cases "when the architectural work is not the primary subject" of the images; this French law-inspired suggestion was also turned down.

The definition of "architectural work" is a building, which is defined as "humanly habitable structures that are intended to be both permanent and stationary, such as houses and office buildings, and other permanent and stationary structures designed for human occupancy, including but not limited to churches, museums, gazebos, and garden pavilions".

==== Other works of art in the United States ====
Nevertheless, the United States freedom of panorama does not cover other artistic works still covered by copyright, including sculptures. Usages of images of such works for commercial purposes may become copyright infringements.

Attorney Charlie Damschen of Hamilton IP Law in Iowa explained that an artist still holds copyright to an artistic work even if it is made to be displayed in public spaces. The matter has been brought into frequent discourse due to the increasing use of copyrighted artistic works on social media and digital media. Nevertheless, the fair use principle permits "transformative" uses of copyrighted works, such as in commentary, criticism, news, and parody. However, if the piece of art was reproduced through photography or videography and the reproduction was made with commercial intent, the use is no longer subject to the fair use defense.

Several monuments located at the National Mall are copyrighted, requiring photographers to seek clearances from the artists or the monument conservators to use their images commercially. Among the copyrighted monuments cited by the National Park Service are multiple sculptures of the Franklin Delano Roosevelt Memorial authored by George Segal, Tom Hardy, Neil Estern, Robert Graham Studio, Leonard Baskin, and John Benson; the Korean War Veterans Memorial; the Marine Corps War Memorial; Martin Luther King Jr. Memorial; and Vietnam Veterans Memorial, in particular the Three Soldiers statue and Vietnam Women's Memorial statue. The current conservator of Vietnam Women's Memorial, in which the copyright remains with the author Glenna Goodacre, explicitly allows unauthorized photographs for personal use and reporting purposes but stresses the journalists to properly indicate the copyright notice of the monument; commercial uses are subject to prior authorization and licensing fees may be demanded, to prevent what the conservator calls the "unscrupulous uses" of the monument.

==== Notable lawsuits concerning sculptures ====
In the Leicester v. Warner Bros. case (2000), the United States District Court for the Central District of California considered the depiction of the 801 Tower in Los Angeles, including the sculptural ensemble at the building's courtyard titled Zanja Madre ("Mother Ditch"), in the Warner Bros. film Batman Forever as within the bounds of Section 120(a). The ensemble, authored by Andrew Leicester, narrates the story of the city's "dependency on man-made water systems and the city's topography as a flourishing, fertile organism within a dry, desert setting." The decision, which was subsequently affirmed by the Ninth Circuit, states that the work – made up of a fountain and several towers organized to act as a walled entrance to the courtyard – was originally designed to be part of the building, with the artistic features on the towers' apexes being integrated in the design of the building. The trial court rejected the notion of "conceptual separability" of the sculpture from the rest of the building.

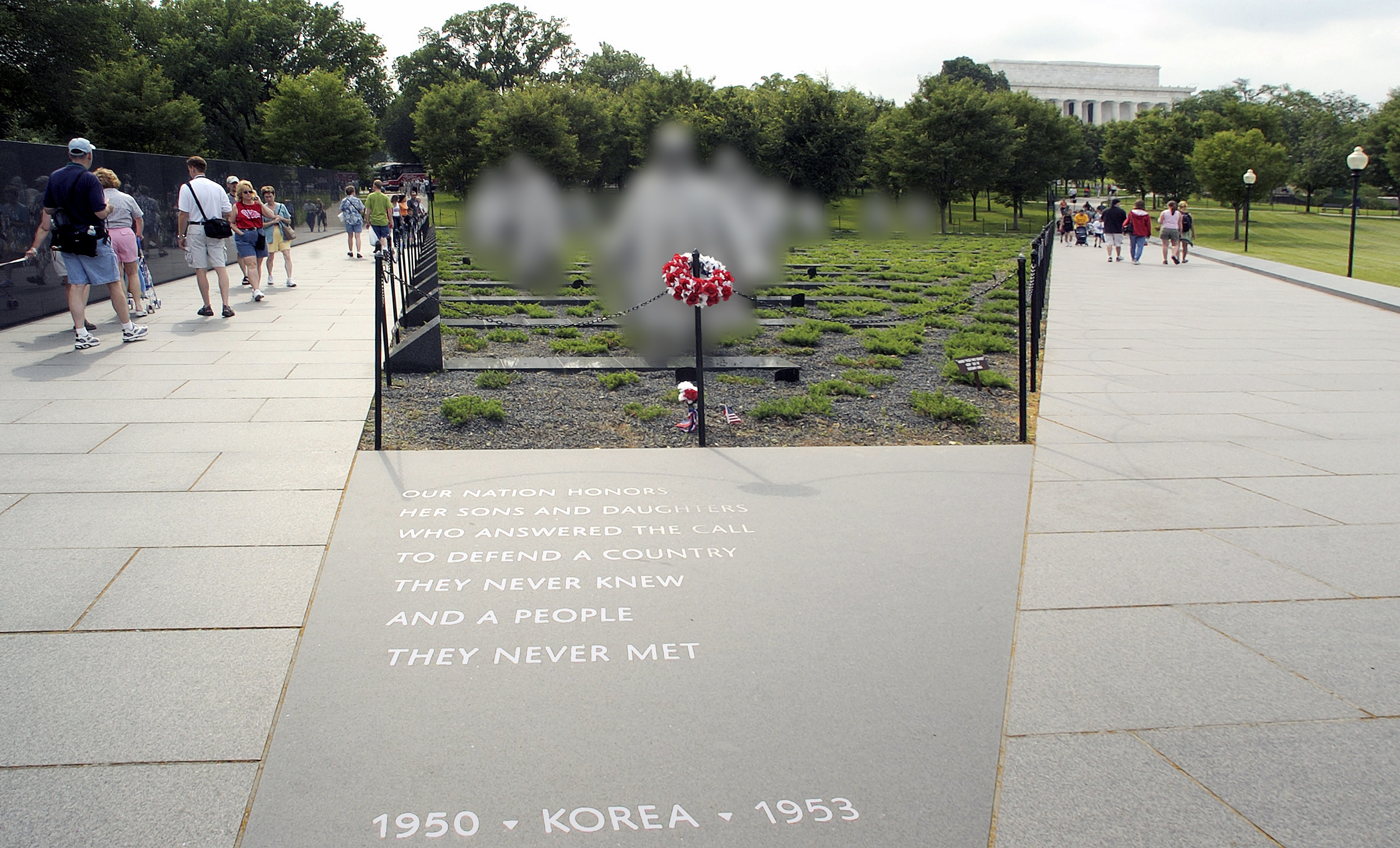
Korean War Veterans Memorial, with the copyrighted statues censored out

The case Gaylord v. United States, No. 09-5044 involved the United States Postal Service's use of an image of 14 out of 19 statues of soldiers in the Korean War Veterans Memorial for their commemorative stamp in the 50th anniversary of the Korean War armistice in 2003. USPS did not obtain permission from Frank Gaylord, sculptor of the artistic work called The Column, for their use of the image on their stamp, which cost 37 cents. Gaylord filed suit against USPS in 2006 for violation of his copyright over the sculpture. Included in the suit was former Marine John Alli, who was the photographer of the image used by USPS. Eventually, an amicable settlement was reached with Alli when the photographer agreed to pay Gaylord a 10% royalty for any subsequent sales of his image of the statues.

In a 2008 decision of the Court of Federal Claims, it was determined that USPS did not infringe Gaylord's copyright as their use complies with fair use. Nevertheless, the court determined that The Column is not covered by the Architectural Works Copyright Protection Act (AWCPA) as it is not a work of architecture. The side of the sculptor appealed, and on February 25, 2010, the Federal Circuit reversed the earlier decision regarding fair use. Fair use is not applicable because the use was not transformative in nature (the context and intended meaning in the stamp remained the same as that of the actual sculpture), the sculpture's presence is substantial, and the purpose of the use is considered commercial (USPS earned $17 million from its sales of almost 48 million stamps bearing this image). The Federal Circuit upheld the earlier decision of the Court of Federal Claims that The Column is not a work of architecture. On remand in 2011, the Court of Federal Claims awarded $5,000 in damages. Gaylord appealed the amount of the damages, and in 2012 the appeals court "remanded the case for a determination of the fair market value of the Postal Service's infringing use". On September 20, 2013, the Court of Federal Claims awarded a total of $684,844.94 worth of economic rights damage that was to be paid by USPS to Gaylord. The Federal Circuit rejected the appeal of USPS for a lower, 10% royalty to the sculptor in 2015.

USPS also faced legal action over their use of a Getty Images-sourced photo of the Las Vegas replica of the Statue of Liberty at New York-New York Hotel & Casino in their stamps. While they provided attribution to the photographer, they failed to give attribution to Robert Davidson, sculptor of the replica. From December 2010 to January 2014 the USPS sold up to 4.9 billion stamps bearing the replica, which amounted to $2.1 billion in sales. Although they became aware in March 2011 that the image being used was not of the original Statue of Liberty, USPS made no action, other than to "correct the catalogue information connected with the stamp." Davidson filed a case against USPS in 2013. The court upheld Davidson's stand that his replica was original enough to be copyrightable due to having more modern and feminine appearance of its face. USPS failed on the "purpose" and "portion used" criteria on fair use, though they passed the "effect of the use" criterion as Davidson stated he had no plans to make profit over his sculpture. Neither party was favored for the "nature of the copyrighted work" criterion on fair use. The court found USPS guilty of copyright infringement, and awarded Davidson $3.5 million in damages to be paid by USPS.

Sculptor Arturo Di Modica, author of New York City's Charging Bull, filed several lawsuits against various entities exploiting his bull sculpture for commercial purposes, including Walmart in 2006 for selling lithographs of it, North Fork Bank also in 2006 for their inclusion of the sculpture in a national television commercial, and Random House in 2009 over the use of an image of the sculpture in the cover of a book about the fall of the Lehman Brothers. The cases concluded with settlements.

Raymond Kaskey, author of Portlandia (the country's second-largest "hammered copper" statue), fiercely protects his copyright over it, having threatened anyone who has attempted to use images of it in postcards, T-shirts, and other commercial media or objects with lawsuits. Portland-based Laurelwood Pub and Brewery reached a cash settlement with Kaskey after he sued them for their use of an image of the sculpture in the label of their Portlandia Pils beer in 2012.

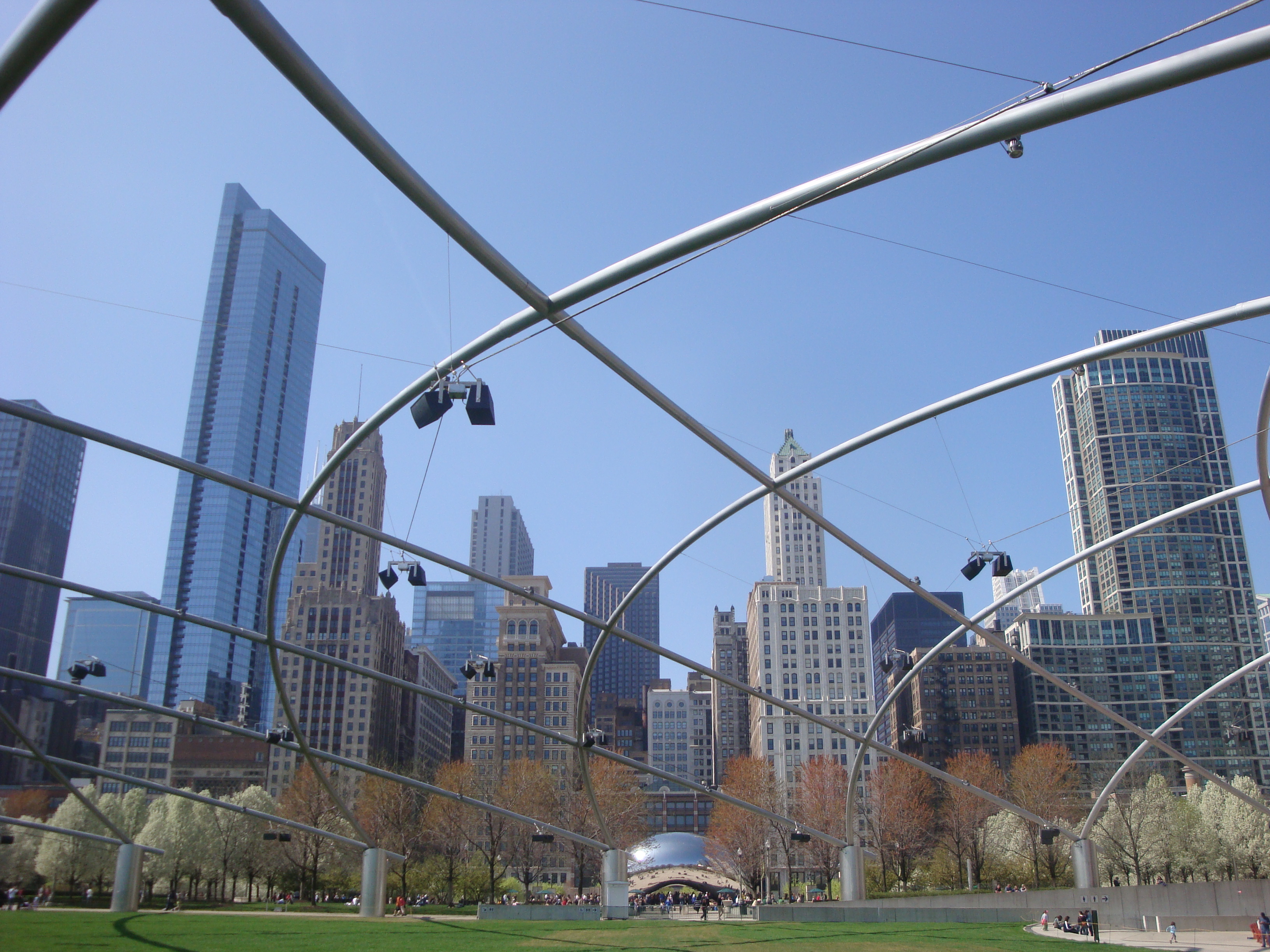
Millennium Park in Chicago, with the trivial presence of the copyrighted Cloud Gate sculpture

Chicago's Cloud Gate sculpture is copyrighted by its artist Anish Kapoor, and according to attorney Henry Kleeman only the City of Chicago has the user right to exploit the bean-shaped public art commercially as they bought a "perpetual paid-up license". The artist filed a lawsuit against National Rifle Association of America (NRA) in 2018 for their inclusion of the public art in their 2017 video advertisement, demanding "$150,000 per infringement" with the number "to be determined according to proof presented in the court." NRA later removed the image of the sculpture from their advertisement, but not without labeling the lawsuit as "baseless" and claiming they had no legal obligation to pay compensation to Kapoor.

==== Notable lawsuits concerning murals and graffiti ====
Miami-based street artist David Anasagasti (also known as "Ahol Sniffs Glue") filed an infringement complaint against American Eagle Outfitters in July 2014 in the United States District Court for the Southern District of New York. The artist alleged that the clothing retailer used his graffito, depicting drowsy eyes, on the Internet and in advertisements in other countries without consent from him. The lawsuit further added that the firm recreated the work in Colombia for its grand opening there. The case was concluded in an undisclosed settlement in December of the same year.

Swiss graffiti artist Adrian Falkner, also known as Smash 137, sued General Motors in January 2018 over a 2016 Cadillac advertising campaign which used a freelance photographer's images of his Detroit graffito. The defendant's lawyers claimed the use is covered under architectural works category, and the graffito does not warrant copyright protection as it is "incorporated into a building." The court could not determine the "relevant connection" between the graphic work and the parking garage where it was painted, commenting that "the Court cannot hold as a matter of law that the mural is part of an architectural work under § 102(a)(8)," and cannot rule that the commercial use was covered by the § 120(a) exemption. The case eventually ended through a settlement.

In January 2018, Mercedes-Benz USA posted on Instagram photographs of Mercedes-Benz G500 taken in Detroit's Eastern Market, with several murals in the background. The posts were eventually removed after complaints from the artists. Four artists, demanding compensation, filed a lawsuit against the firm. The firm, in turn, filed a counter lawsuit against the artists, insisting that their use of the murals did not violate any laws, citing the panorama exception provided by AWCPA as the basis. The court itself could not determine whether the freedom of panorama claim holds water. The case was eventually settled out of court.

In the May 2018 case Gayle v. Home Box Office, Inc., the District Court for the Southern District of New York denied the lawsuit initiated by street artist Itoffee Gayle, who claimed that one episode of HBO's Vinyl television series featured a scene that included his graffito painted on a dumpster in New York City. Applying the de minimis principle in copyright, the court ruled that the graffito only appeared very briefly – at most 3 seconds – on the dumpster in the background of a single scene. It added that the artwork used was not the main motif of the scene, had no connection to the plot, and "is hard enough to notice when the video is paused at the critical moment."

Clothing retailer H&M used a Brooklyn graffito designed by artist Revok in their advertisement, leading to the artist's lawyer sending a cease-and-desist letter to them in January 2018. The firm retaliated by filing a case against Revok in March that year, claiming that the copyright law does not benefit works made illegally like graffiti. After a backlash against H&M in which the street art community called for a boycott of H&M products, the firm withdrew its legal threat against the graffiti artist and deleted its campaign on its website. A settlement was reached between Revok and H&M in September that year, promising monetary contributions to art organizations based in Detroit, the birthplace of Revok.

==== Reception ====
Frank Lloyd Wright Foundation's Richard Carney, during the Congressional debate for the AWCPA, supported the architectural panorama exception, provided that it does not extend to the architectural drawings. Both Brian Schermer, assistant professor of the Department of Architecture of the University of Wisconsin–Milwaukee, and architect Patricia Frost of Milwaukee-based Pace Architects, in two separate interviews in November 2003, "appreciated the opportunity to photograph other architects' work without fear of infringement." Accordingly, a building being exposed to the public in open display "is part of the architect's intrinsic reward", giving them the opportunity to showcase their buildings to their audiences. AIA themselves argued "that architects sell a service, not a product", with the copyright being an instrument to give an incentive to the author to stimulate greater creativity for the good of the general public.

On the other hand, Columbia Law School's Jane C. Ginsburg expressed her concern to the architectural panorama exception, asserting it denies the architects' right to control reproductions in unauthorized commercial objects as unlicensed posters, T-shirts, and lunch box designs; she also claimed it may not be compatible with the Berne Convention. This criticism was echoed by architect Clark T. Thiel in 1996, who proposed the abolition of Section 120(a). Sierra Epke in 2024 suggested restricting the provision to non-commercial uses only, asserting that it should protect street art permanently painted on outdoor walls of the buildings, in light of increasing cases concerning commercial uses of street art by American corporations, who then use the panorama exception as their defenses. Epke claims that the original intents of the Congress to add the panorama exception – for uses of architecture by scholars and tourists – "are generally not thought to be made with the intent of making a profit."

Regarding non-architectural works, Andrew Inesi of Mattel Overseas Operations Ltd. argued that the panorama exception should extend to public art, as the copyright law is "ill-equipped" to deal with instances of the public using images of monuments in the midst of changing technologies which empower ordinary consumers to conduct activities once reserved to professionals.

=== Vietnam ===
Freedom of panorama in Vietnam is restricted to non-commercial photography and television broadcasting of public art and architecture. Article 25(h) of the newly amended Vietnamese copyright law (2022) states it is permitted to photograph and broadcast publicly displayed works of plastic art, architecture, and applied art "for the purpose of presenting images of these works," but not for commercial purposes.

== See also ==
- Copyleft
- Directive on Copyright in the Digital Single Market
- Free content
- Photography and the law
- Public domain
- Trademark

== Sources ==
- Oman, Ralph (June 19, 1989). THE REPORT OF THE REGISTER OF COPYRIGHTS ON WORKS OF ARCHITECTURE (PDF) (Report). United States: US Copyright Office. ISBN 0-8444-0653-8.
