= Luca Spinelli =

Swiss journalist

Luca Spinelli is a Swiss investigative journalist, columnist and the founder of the legal open source project Oscon. He has written front-page news for La Repubblica, La Stampa, Rizzoli-Corriere della Sera, Wired, Il Manifesto and others.

== Career ==
Born in Italy, Spinelli started his journalistic career writing for VNU Business Publications and Feltrinelli. Since the last 2000s, he has been columnist for the newspaper Punto Informatico. While still a university student, in 2004 he founded Oscon, a legal non-profit and open project committed to spreading an open standard contract and which provides pro bono legal advising. Up to 2018, the contract has been downloaded more than 220.000 times and it is one of the most used in the country.

During his career, Spinelli has conducted investigations, which gave rise to widespread debates. In July 2007, MPs Franco Grillini and Cinzia Dato appended one of Spinelli's investigations about copyright to a parliamentary inquiry towards vice-Prime Minister Francesco Rutelli, promoting a reform of the legislation on copyright. After this investigation, the lack of freedom of panorama in the Italian legal system has been considered a matter of fact and a subject of discussion. In the same year, Spinelli's reporting on a security bill promoted by the Government, caused its correction during the Council of Ministers of Italy. In 2008, his investigation on the Government budget revealed the intent of the Government to establish public funding for record labels, causing debates with deputy Gabriella Carlucci and the FIMI's president. The same year, Spinelli wrote an investigation, cited by Sergio Rizzo in his bestseller Rapaci (Rizzoli), about the institutional web portal Italia.it, in which he revealed the waste of public money. Later, his investigation on a bill by Ricardo Franco Levi led to a wide strike promoted by Beppe Grillo, criticisms by journalists and politicians (Gad Lerner, Vincenzo Vita, Giuseppe Giulietti, Pino Scaccia), and eventually caused the withdrawal of the bill.

Subsequently, Spinelli drew up with lawyer G. Scorza the bill "Give a meaning to the degradation" concerning a modification of the Italian copyright law, which was supported by the MPs Bruno Mellano, Mauro Bulgarelli, Elio Veltri and others. The bill was scheduled to be discussed to the Chamber of Deputies, but the fall of the Government halted the process. It was supported again by the Radical Party in the late 2010. The following year, Spinelli's journalistic investigation „La Camera manda avanti il Ddl anti-blog“ was nominated for the 30th Ischia International Journalism Award. For Swiss newspapers, he released the news of the fall of Switzerland into the gray list of tax heavens, and subsequently commented most of the tax treaty between Switzerland and other nations (USA, United Kingdom, Mexico, Qatar, India...). In June 2015 he published with Wired a broad investigation about privacy management laws over the world. Afterwards, Spinelli worked with the Creative Commons group for the translation into Italian of the Creative Commons 4.0 licenses, published in the late 2017.

Amongst the Italian expert on accessibility, he was a selected member of the SIE (Italian associate of the International Ergonomics Association), and has been publishing educational articles and essays. He has lectured and provided scientific and legal consulting to the University of Genoa. He is also author of interviews with minister Antonio Di Pietro, scientist Corrado Böhm and activist Ludwig Minelli.

== Awards and nominations ==
Year	Work	Award	Result
2009	journalistic investigation „La Camera manda avanti il Ddl anti-blog“	Ischia International Journalism Award	Nominated
