= Copyright law of Turkey =

Turkish copyright law is documented in the law number 5846 on Intellectual and Artistic Works (Turkish: Fikir ve Sanat Eserleri Kanunu).

Turkey is revising its intellectual property rights laws in order to align them with WIPO standards. Turkiye is a party to the Berne Convention, the Rome Convention and the TRIPS Agreement. Turkiye copyright law was made compliant with these treaties after its 1995 and 2001 amendments.

As in all countries, a number of limitations and exceptions are codified in Turkish copyright law. These include a doctrine of exhaustion of rights after the first sale (Article 23/2), which prevents a copyright holder from controlling circulation of lawfully made copies after they have been made available to the public. It also includes a number of exceptions and limitations in Articles 31 through 38, allowing re-use of various government works (Articles 31 and 32), educational performances and collections (Articles 33 and 34), quotations of works in various circumstances (Articles 35 and 36), and incidental captures of copyrighted content in informational and news footage (Article 37). Additionally, Turkish law includes reproduction of works for personal use (Article 38).

== History ==
The first Ottoman Empire copyright regulation was the 1850 Encumen-I Danis Nizamnamesi. The 1857 Matbaalar Nizamnamesi granted writers lifetime copyright. The 1910 Authors' Rights Act was based on mid-1800s French law or the German Copyright Code of 1901 and remained in force until 1951 though with little enforcement.

== Amendments ==
Originally written in December 1951, law 5846 has been amended by the following laws:

- 2936, 1983-11-01
- 4110, 1995-06-07
- 4630, 2001-02-21
- 5101, 2004-03-03 (known as anti-piracy law among public)
- 5217, 2004-07-14
- 5571, 2006-12-28
- 5728, 2008-01-23
- 6279, 2012-02-29
- 6552, 2014-09-10
- 6769, 2017-01-10
- 7346, 2021-12-25

== Related laws ==
Other laws applicable to the creation of audiovisual art are

- 3984 (on the Establishment of Radio and Television Enterprises and their Broadcasts)
- 3257 (on Cinema, Video and Musical Works)
- 5680 (Press Law)
- 1117 (on the Protection of Minors against Harmful Publications)
- 4054 (on the Protection of Competition)

== See also ==
- Freedom of panorama in Turkey
- List of parties to international copyright agreements
- Copyright law of the European Union
