= Copyright law of Thailand =

Copyright law in Thailand governs the legally enforceable rights of creative and artistic works under the Copyright Act BE 2537 (1994). Copyright is automatically protected for 50 years after the death of a known author or 50 years after publication in the case of an unknown author. It does not need registration; however, it can be filed with the Department of Intellectual property (DIP). Disputes are first heard in the Intellectual Property and International Trade Court.

The Copyright Act BE 2537 (1994) governs the subject of copyright law in Thailand.

== Copyright term ==
The copyright term is the life of the author plus 50 years. When the author is a legal entity or an anonymous person, the copyright term is 50 years from the date of publication. Works of applied art (defined as a work which takes a composition of works such as drawings, paintings, sculpture, prints, architecture, photography, drafts, or models for utility or functional use) have a copyright term of 25 years from publication.

== Public domain ==
Republication of works after the expiration of the copyright term does not reset the copyright term. Thai state documents are public domain, though creative works produced by or commissioned by government offices are protected by copyright.

== Types of work protected ==
Copyright work by virtue of the copyright act means a work of authorship in the form of literary, dramatic, artistic, musical, audiovisual, cinematographic, sound recording, sound and video broadcasting work or any other work in the literary, scientific or artistic domain.

The following are not deemed copyrightable by the 1994 copyright act:

- news of the day or facts which are not work in literary, scientific, or artistic domain
- constitution and legislation
- regulations, by-laws, notifications, orders, explanations and official correspondence of the ministries, departments, or any other government or local units
- judicial decisions, orders, decisions

== Infringement of copyright ==
Any of the following acts against a copyrighted work (including audiovisual work, a cinematographic work or a sound recording, and computer program) without permission, would be considered an infringement of copyright:

1. Reproduction or adaptation of the work
2. Communication to the public
3. Letting of the original or copies of the work
4. Rebroadcasting whether whole or in part
5. Making a work to be heard or seen in public by charging money or another commercial benefit
6. Selling, occupying for sale, offering for sale, letting, offering for lease, selling by hire purchase or offering for hire purchase
7. Distribution that may cause damage to the owner of a copyright

== Exception from infringement of copyright ==
An act against a copyrighted work by virtue of the copyright act which does not conflict with a normal exploitation shall not be deemed an infringement of copyright:

1. Research or study of the work without profit
2. Use for personal benefit or for the benefit of herself and other family members or close relatives
3. Comment, criticism or introduction of the work with an acknowledgement of the ownership of copyright in such work
4. Reporting of the news through mass media with an acknowledgement of the ownership of copyright in such work
5. Reproduction, adaptation, exhibition, or display for the benefit of judicial proceedings or administrative proceedings by authorized officials or for reporting the result of such proceedings
6. Reproduction, adaptation, exhibition, or display by a teacher for educational purposes with no profit motive
7. Reproduction, adaptation in part of a work, or making a summary by a teacher or an educational institution for distribution to students in a class or in an educational institution without gaining any profit
8. Use of the work as part of questions and answers in an examination
9. Reproduction for use in a library
10. Reasonable reproduction for the benefit of research or study

== Penalties ==
Whosoever infringes copyright or the performers shall be punished with a fine from 20,000 to 200,000 baht. If the offence is committed for commercial purposes, the offender shall be punished with imprisonment for a term from six months up to four years or a fine from 100,000 to 800,000 baht or both imprisonment and fine.

Whosoever infringes copyright by selling the work for profit, distribution which may cause damage to the owner of copyright, or communicating the work to the public by knowing that the work is made by infringing the copyright of another person shall be punished with a fine from 10,000 to 100,000 baht. If the offence is committed for commercial purposes, the offender shall be punished with imprisonment for a term from three months up to two years or a fine from 50,000 to 400,000 baht or both imprisonment and fine.

== Thailand on the priority watch list ==
In 2014, Thailand remains on the US Priority Watch List. Thailand has stated its commitment to improve intellectual property rights (IPR) protection and enforcement. With the help of the National IPR Center of Enforcement, launched in March 2013, Thailand is expected to be able to improve coordination and allow more effective enforcement actions among Thai enforcement.

The US urged Thailand to take action against widespread piracy and counterfeiting in the country, and to engage with all relevant stakeholders, including IPR owners, to address Thailand's public health challenges, while maintaining a patent system that promotes innovation.
