= Kim Ku =

Korean independence activist (1876–1949)

The Right Honourable Kim Ku
- Kim in 1949

President of the Provisional Government of the Republic of Korea
- In office December 14, 1926 – August 1927
- Vice President: Kim Kyu-sik
- Preceded by: Hong Jin
- Succeeded by: Yi Dong-nyeong
- In office March 1940 – March 1947
- Preceded by: Yi Dong-nyeong
- Succeeded by: Syngman Rhee (President of the Provisional Government)

Prime Minister of the Provisional Government of the Republic of Korea
- In office October 1930 – October 1933
- Preceded by: Roh Baek-lin
- Succeeded by: Yang Kit'ak

Personal details
- Born: August 29, 1876 T'otkol village, Paegunbang, Haeju, Joseon
- Died: June 26, 1949 (aged 72) Gyeonggyojang, Seoul, South Korea
- Cause of death: Assassination by gunshots
- Resting place: Hyochang Park, Yongsan District, Seoul, South Korea
- Party: Korea Independence Party
- Children: Kim In; Kim Shin
- Religion: Methodism formerly Cheondoism, Buddhism
- Kim Ku's voice Kim speaking at a North–South Korean joint meeting Recorded 1948

Korean name
- Hangul: 김구
- Hanja: 金九
- RR: Gim Gu
- MR: Kim Ku
- IPA: [kim.ɡu]

Art name
- Hangul: 백범
- Hanja: 白凡
- RR: Baekbeom
- MR: Paekpŏm
- IPA: [pɛk.p͈ʌm]

Courtesy name
- Hangul: 연하
- Hanja: 蓮下
- RR: Yeonha
- MR: Yŏnha

Childhood name
- Hangul: 김창암
- Hanja: 金昌巖
- RR: Gim Changam
- MR: Kim Ch'angam

Kim Ku (Note: Sometimes written as "Kim Koo" or "Kim Gu") (Korean: 김구; Hanja: 金九; August 29, 1876 – June 26, 1949), also known by his art name Paekpŏm, (Note: 백범; also Baekbeom in Revised Romanisation) was a Korean independence activist and statesman. He was a leader of the Korean independence movement against the Empire of Japan, head of the Korean Provisional Government from 1926 to 1927 and from 1940 to 1945, and a Korean reunification activist after 1945. Kim is revered in South Korea, where he is considered one of the greatest figures in Korean history; his legacy is also somewhat less enthusiastically celebrated in North Korea, due to his anti-communist views.

Born in Haeju, Hwanghae Province, Joseon, to a poor farming family, Kim was involved in the Donghak Peasant Revolution in 1894. In 1896, he murdered a Japanese man whom he believed was connected to the assassination of Empress Myeongseong (though he is now generally agreed to be a civilian merchant), for which he was imprisoned until escaping in 1898. Kim was briefly a Buddhist monk before becoming a Christian and teacher in 1903. In 1911, he was arrested in connection with the 105-Man Incident and was again imprisoned until 1914. In 1919, he participated in the March First Movement against the Japanese. While in exile in the Republic of China, he helped found the Korean Provisional Government, and served as its president from 1926 to 1927 and from 1940. Kim also founded and led several other organizations, including the Korean Independence Party, Korean Patriotic Organization, and Korean Liberation Army.

After the surrender of Japan in World War II, Kim returned to Korea in 1945 as head of the provisional government. Kim became a critic of Syngman Rhee, the U.S.'s preferred candidate for leader of South Korea, and made efforts to prevent a permanent division of Korea. Defying the wishes of Rhee and the U.S., he went to Pyongyang to hold unification talks with Kim Il Sung, but was unable to reach an agreement. He fiercely opposed the establishment of separate states in North and South Korea, which took place in 1948. In 1949, before the outbreak of the Korean War, Kim was assassinated by army officer Ahn Doo-hee.

== Early life ==
Kim was born Kim Ch'angam, (Note: Korean: 김창암; Hanja: 金昌巖; [kimtɕʰaŋam]) on August 29, 1876, in T'otkol village, Paegunbang, (Note: 텃골; 基洞, 백운방; 白雲坊) Haeju, Hwanghae Province, Joseon. He was the only child of two farmers: mother Kwak Nagwŏn and father Kim Sunyŏng. (Note: Father's name (김순영; 金淳永). Kim's birth was a difficult one, with his mother spending about a week in labor until he was born. The family engaged in various superstitious rituals to ease the birth.)

Kim's family was impoverished, poorly educated, and looked down upon by the community. His father belonged to the formerly yangban (upper-class) Andong Kim clan. However, the clan had lost its noble status in 1651, when its member Kim Chajŏm fell from grace. Chajŏm's direct descendants became slaves, and the rest of the Andong clan became commoners.

At age two, Kim suffered from smallpox, leaving him with scars on his face.

His family placed great emphasis on his education in order to have him escape poverty. When he was around nine years old, his parents moved to place him in a local seodang (school) in preparation for the gwageo, the demanding civil service examinations that determined placement in government intellectual jobs. However, schools rejected him on the basis of his lower class, so he eventually began his education at age twelve with a tutor that was willing to teach him.

In 1888, the father of 12-year-old Kim suffered a stroke that left him paralyzed. Desperate to cure him, Kim's mother sold off all of the family's belongings, including silverware, and left Kim Ku at a relative's house while she took her husband around the province in search of a doctor. Kim paid for his accommodations by cutting and carrying wood during this time. Kim's father eventually somewhat recovered, and was able to walk on his own, albeit with difficulty. The family then struggled to pay for Kim's school supplies, so his mother worked to afford them by weaving and working as a hired farm hand.

In 1892, at the age of 16, Kim took the gwageo but failed. (Note: Kim took the last examinations to ever be offered in his region, before they were abolished by the Kabo Reform of 1894.) He reportedly witnessed and was frustrated by the elite candidates engaging in cheating and bribes. He quit studying at the seodang and spent three months studying philosophical and military texts on his own and reflecting on his life.

== Activities before Japanese occupation (1893–1905) ==
=== Donghak Revolution (1893–1894) ===
In January 1893, Kim joined the Donghak movement after traveling to meet its leader, O Ŭngsŏn in Podong. The movement was created in 1860 in reaction to the instability of Joseon in the 19th century and the spread of foreign influence and religion in Korea. It sought to rejuvenate the country by revising Confucian practices, introducing democracy, establishing human rights, and eliminating foreign interference. Within a year, Kim became a well-known figure amongst hundreds of people in the movement. During this time, he changed his name to Kim Ch'angsu (김창수; 金昌洙), following the East Asian practice of changing names after significant life events.

In early 1894, the peasant revolution began. 17-year-old Kim was appointed a district leader of P'albong (팔봉) and given a Donghak army regiment of around 700. Around September or November, by order of Donghak leader Ch'oi Sihyŏng (최시형; 崔時亨), Kim's troops stormed the Haeju fort in Hwanghae province, but the unit was eventually defeated by government and Japanese forces.

A power struggle then occurred, in which Yi Tongyŏp (이동엽), a fellow rebel, wished to take control of Kim's unit. In December of that year, Yi's unit attacked Kim's and won. Kim managed to escape to the mountainous Monggeumpo. In the meantime, Yi captured and executed Kim's close subordinate Yi Chongsŏn (이종선). Eventually, Kim buried his comrade and decided to defect.

=== Defection and journey to Qing (1895–1896) ===
In 1895, Kim defected and joined Royal Army General An T'aehun (안태훈; 安泰勳; 1862–1905). He spent three months in hiding, while recovering from measles and a high fever. An took such a liking to Kim, that he took Kim into his own home and procured a separate house for Kim's parents. He scolded any officials that treated Kim poorly. During this time, Kim also became acquainted with An's eldest son An Jung-geun. The younger An would later infamously assassinate the Japanese resident-general of Korea, Itō Hirobumi, and become a national hero in both modern Koreas.

An also introduced Kim to Ko Nŭngsŏn (고능선; 高能善), a well-known scholar in the region who followed an isolationist Neo-Confucian ideology called Wijŏngch'ŏksa. They spoke every day for months. Robert S. Kim argues that this made a lasting impact on Kim's thinking, even after Kim's later conversion to Christianity. Ko convinced Kim that Joseon was in great danger from Japanese imperialism, and that he should go visit Qing China to convince them to help protect Joseon.

Thus, at age 20, Kim and a companion around eight to nine years his elder named Kim Hyŏngjin (김형진; 金亨鎭) decided to first make a pilgrimage to the legendary ancestral home of Koreans, Paektu Mountain, then through Manchuria, and finally to the Qing capital Beijing. However, near the foot of the mountain, they decided the journey would be too perilous, and instead decided to go directly to Tonghua in Manchuria.

On the way to Tonghua, near the Yalu River, which currently serves as the border between China and North Korea, the two men joined the righteous army commanded by Kim Iyŏn (김이언; 金利彦), who was in the midst of attacking Kanggye fortress. However, the attack failed, and Kim escaped.

=== Killing of Tsuchida Josuke (1896) ===
In February 1896, upon hearing of China's impending loss in the Sino–Japanese War, Kim decided to give up on his trip and return home. He tried to take a boat from Ch'ihap'o (치하포; 鵄河浦) in Hwanghae Province to Chinnamp'o (진남포; 鎭南浦), but ice in the river made traveling dangerous, so he stayed in Ch'ihap'o at an inn.

There, Kim met a man also on his way to Chinnamp'o that he found suspicious. Kim wrote the following of this occurrence in his later autobiography: (Note: "가운뎃방에 단발한 사람 하나가 눈에 띄었다. 그가 어떤 행객과 인사하는 것을 들으니 그의 성은 정씨요, 장연에 산다고 한다. 장연에서는 일찍 단발령이 실시되어서 민간인들도 머리를 깎은 사람이 많았다. 그러나 그 말씨가 장연 사투리가 아니요, 서울말이었다. 조선말이 썩 능숙하지마는 내 눈에는 분명 왜놈이었다. 자세히 살펴보니 그의 흰 두루마기 밑으로 군도집이 보였다. 어디로 가느냐 한즉 그는 진남포로 가는 길이라고 한다. 보통으로 장사나 공업을 하는 일인 같으면 이렇게 변복, 변성명을 할 까닭이 없으니 이는 필시 국모를 죽인 삼포오루(三浦梧樓:미우라 고로) 놈이거나 그렇지 아니하면 그의 일당일 것이요, 설사 이도 저도 아니라 하더라도 우리 국가와 민족에 독균이 되기는 분명한 일이니, 저놈 한 놈을 죽여서라도 하나의 수치를 씻어보리라고 나는 결심하였다.")

A short-haired man in the center room caught my eye. I overheard him greeting another traveler. He said his surname was "Chŏng", and that he was from Changyon County. But in Changyon, most civilians had shaved heads due to a grooming order. And he spoke in the Seoul accent, not the Changyon accent. Not being able to speak Korean fluently made him, in my eyes, a Japanese bastard (왜놈). Looking closer, I could see a sword hidden underneath his robe. When asked where he was going, he said "to Chinnamp'o". I could think of no other reason that someone on a business trip would want to disguise his identity and name, other than that he was Miura Gorō or one of Miura's comrades that assassinated Empress Myeongseong. Even if he was not, he was a poison to our country and nation. I decided that killing at least him would wash away some of our shame.

On March 9, 1896, around 3 am, Kim took the man by surprise and kicked him to the floor. A scuffle ensued, and Kim managed to take the man's own sword and stab him. Afterwards, Kim announced to other people what he had done, and left a proclamation on a wall that read "I killed this Japanese to avenge the death of our queen. Signed Kim Ch'angsu of T'otkol, Paegunbang, Haeju". (Note: "국모보수(國母報讐)의 목적으로 이 왜인을 죽이노라. 해주 백운방 텃골 김창수(金昌洙)")

Kim inspected the man's possessions, and claimed that they positively identified the man as a Japanese army first lieutenant. The exact events and the identity of the man are still debated. However, the general consensus is that the man was Tsuchida Josuke (土田譲亮), a Japanese trader from Tsushima Island, Nagasaki who arrived in Korea in December 1895.

Meanwhile, Im Hakkil (임학길; 林學吉), a Korean interpreter, went to Pyongyang and reported the murder to Hirahara Atsumu (平原篤武) at the Japanese consulate. Hirahara arrived in Ch'ihap'o on March 15, and ordered Kim's arrest.

=== First imprisonment (1896–1898) ===
Joseon authorities took a relaxed attitude towards Kim's arrest, and thus he was arrested three months later, around late June 1896, in his home. He was first held at a jail in Haeju, where he endured torture and poor treatment from Japanese authorities present at the jail, and was then moved to Incheon.

In Incheon, the constable and superintendent of the prison asked Kim why he killed Tsuchida. Upon hearing his answer, they were sympathetic and treated him with respect. Influential Koreans at the time, including major merchants of Incheon, repeatedly petitioned Korean Justice Department officials to pardon him and collected money for his bail.

Through processes that he did not fully understand at the time, Kim narrowly avoided an execution. On September 12, 1896, the Japanese consular agent Hagiwara Shuichi (萩原守一) found Kim guilty of the crime of manslaughter, and recommended execution by beheading. On October 2, 1896, the superintendent, under pressure from the consulate, suggested by telegram to the Incheon court that Kim be executed promptly. The court responded by saying they should ask King Gojong's permission. On October 22, 1896, the King read the motivation behind Kim's actions, and did not approve the sentences of Kim and 10 others. Thus, Kim escaped death.

In prison, Kim read newly-published translations of history and science books from the West. (Note: Kim read the Taeseosinsa (태서신사; 泰西新史) and Saegyejiji (세계지지; 世界地誌). The Taeseosinsa is a translation of the 1880 book The 19th Century: A History by British author Robert Mackenzie. It was translated first into Chinese in 1895, and a Chinese copy arrived in the Korean Empire by June 1897, where it was translated again into Korean.) He was deeply impressed by what he read, in spite of the isolationist beliefs he had acquired from his time in the Donghak movement and from Ko. He reportedly then abandoned the idea that Westerners were barbarians, and decided that embracing new ideas would revolutionize Korea.

He taught many of his fellow prisoners how to read and write. While he first did this in exchange for favors, he began doing it voluntarily. This helped his standing in the prison, as even guards would ask him for help reading and writing.

=== Escape and Buddhist monkhood (1898–1899) ===
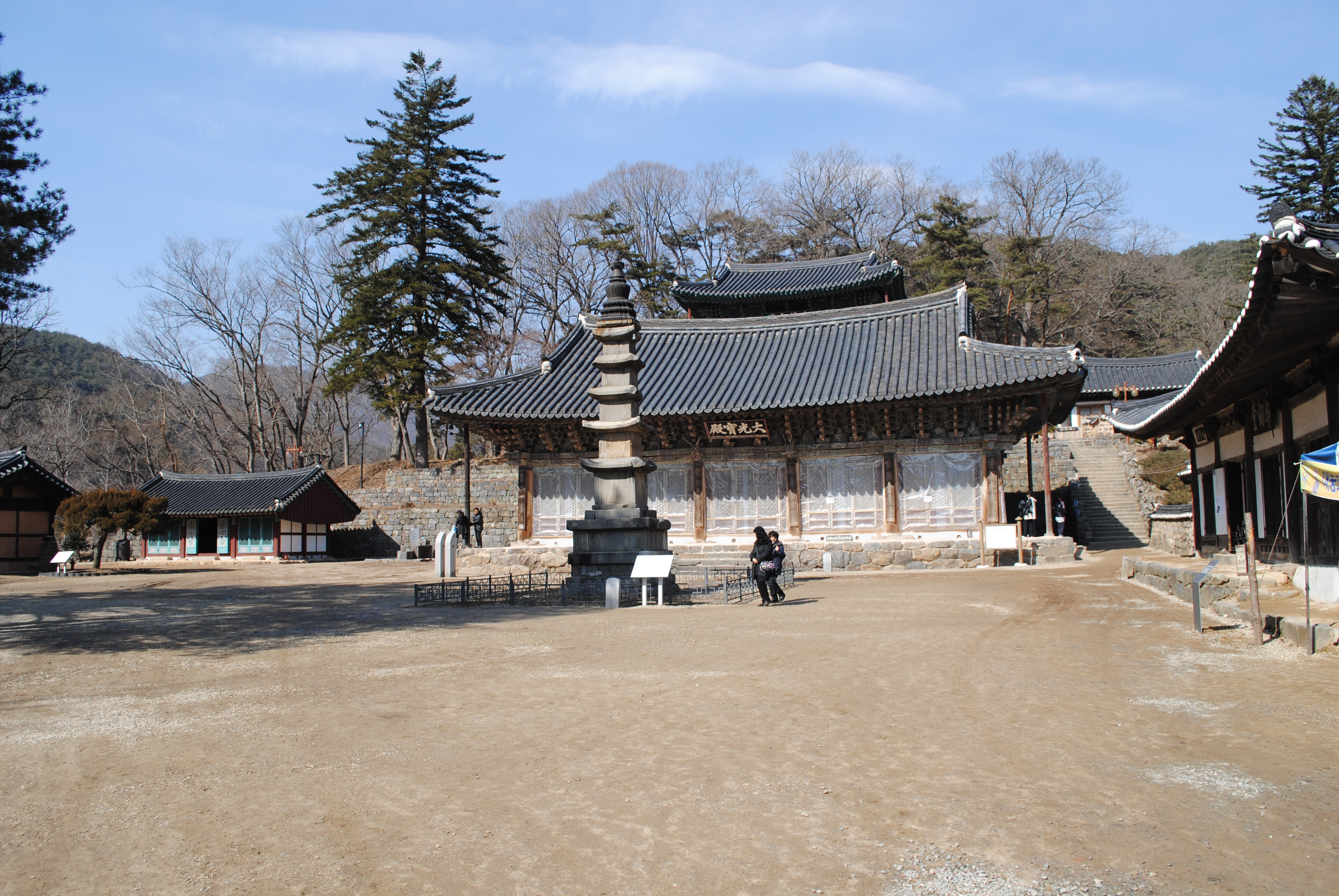
Magoksa, the Buddhist temple where Kim stayed around 1898–1899 after escaping from prison. Picture from 2011

On March 19, 1898, he and several fellow prisoners successfully broke out of prison. In response, the Japanese arrested Kim's father and held him for a year. He then walked from Seoul through Suwon and Osan, through the southern half of Korea, on a journey of over 800 km (500 mi).

In the fall, Kim eventually met a monk with the surname Lee, who guided him to Magoksa, a Jogye Buddhist temple in Chungcheong Province. As Lee held a high position at the temple, he offered to let Kim join as a monk and to cover Kim's expenses.

Kim shaved his head and became a monk named Wŏnjong (원종; 圓宗). He was frequently criticized by the monks at the temple for making mistakes while performing chants and chores. As he did not necessarily believe in Buddhism or enjoy the lifestyle, he decided he wanted to leave.

In spring of 1899, Kim requested to go study at Geumgang Mountain. His request was approved by the head monk, who gave him rations of grain for his journey. Instead of going to the mountain, Kim slipped away from his fellow monks and reunited with his parents. By May, they made their way to Taebo mountain near Pyongyang.

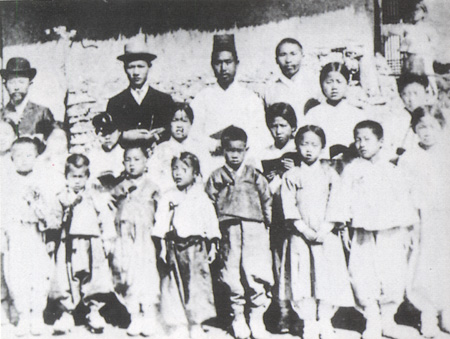
Kim (back row, without hat) as a farmer and teacher (1906)

=== Return home (1900–1905) ===
After his return to his home region, Kim visited Ko Nŭng-sŏn, who was disappointed to learn that Kim had embraced foreign ideas. Kim decided Ko's ideas were outdated, and left him.

Kim returned home, around September or October, and his father died on December 9, 1900.

After his father's death, Kim adopted the religion he had once opposed and was baptized as a Protestant Christian in February 1903. (Note: He attended a Bible study class that followed a strict schedule: "an early morning prayer meeting, breakfast, 30 minutes of worship, morning Bible study, lunch, afternoon bible study, choral lessons, spreading the Gospel, dinner, and an evening of discussion".) In December 1904, he married Ch'oe Chunrye (최준례; 崔遵禮) from Sinchon, Hwanghae Province. He was previously briefly engaged to two women, including Ch'oe Yŏok (최여옥; 如玉), who died from illness in 1903, and An Sinho, (Note: 안신호. An was the younger sister of famous Korean independence activist An Changho.) whom he broke the engagement off with in 1903. He and Ch'oe Chunrye had a daughter together in 1906, but the daughter died within a year.

He worked as a farmer and started and became principal of several schools. He himself taught various subjects and at various levels, including middle school math. He moved several times for his work during this period.

== Independence activities in Korea (1905–1919) ==
In November 1905, the short-lived Korean Empire became a protectorate of Japan, after it was compelled to sign the Japan-Korea Treaty of 1905 (also known as the "Eulsa Treaty"). The treaty was the result of Japanese victory in the 1904–1905 Russo-Japanese War, the 1905 Taft-Katsura agreement between Japan and the United States, and the 1894–1895 First Sino–Japanese War. The combination of these factors effectively cemented Japan's status as the main great power in the region. In a few years, in 1910, Korea would be formally annexed into the Japanese Empire.

Shortly after the November 1905 treaty, Kim went to Seoul to participate in protests against the treaty. He and other future leaders of the Korean independence movement such as Yi Tongnyŏng and Yi Chun gave speeches at the palace gates Daehanmun of the royal palace Deoksugung. They urged Emperor Gwangmu (formerly "King Gojong") to withdraw from the treaty. However, these protests were dispersed by the Korean authorities. Disheartened, Kim decided that Korea would continue to be stuck in a weak position until its people became smarter and more patriotic. He resolved to commit himself more fully to his educational activities. He returned home and continued teaching.

In 1907, Kim joined the New People's Association. He then became the leader of its Hwanghae branch. The organization was founded in 1906 by Ahn Changho in Los Angeles, California, and was dedicated to the independence of Korea.

In 1909, after An Jung-geun assassinated Itō Hirobumi, Kim was arrested and jailed for around a month amongst a wave of arrests in the independence movement. He was eventually released after no evidence linking him to the murder was found.

=== Third imprisonment (1911–1915) ===
In January 1911, over 700 Koreans were arrested by the Japanese colonial government on charges of planning to assassinate Terauchi Masatake, the Governor-General of Chōsen. Kim was arrested via his connection to An Myeong-geun, the cousin of An Jung-geun. In total, 105 people were sentenced, leading this incident to be known as the "105-Man Incident". Kim received a sentence of 15 years.

He spent two years and six months in Seodaemun Prison, which is now a museum. There, he was tortured and beaten. Kim's left ear became permanently disfigured, and he attempted suicide. His calves were already scarred from his earlier imprisonment after the killing of Tsuchida. Fellow prisoner Han P'ilho (한필호; 韓弼昊) was killed, and Sin Sŏkch'ung (신석충; 申錫忠) killed themself. An also attempted suicide during the interrogation process but survived.

In 1912, while imprisoned, Kim changed his name to his most famous one: "Kim Ku". This name, which literally means "nine", was deliberately plain, in contrast to the often intricate names chosen by others. His also-famous art name, "Paekpŏm", follows a similar theme. It literally means "ordinary person". Together, these names reflected Kim's belief that even the most ordinary person could and needed to fight for Korean independence.

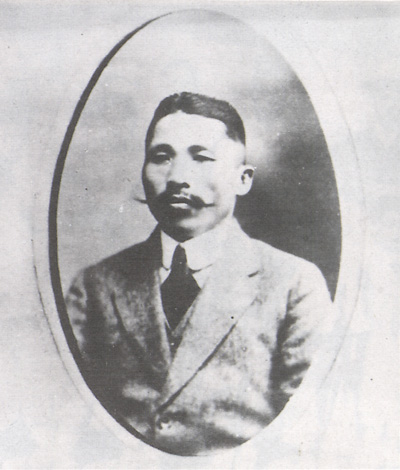
Kim Ku, with disfigured left ear after torture and imprisonment (1919)

After his time in Seodaemun, he was transferred to an Incheon prison. As prisoner number 55, Kim was reunited with his former cellmate from 17 years ago, Mun Chongch'il (문종칠; 文種七).

=== Release from prison (1915–1919) ===
Kim did not end up serving his full sentence in prison. Emperor Meiji died in July 1912, and Empress Shoken in April 1914, which led to successive pardons issued by the Japanese government. His sentence was first reduced to seven years, then a third of his remaining sentence was commuted. He spent the remaining two years of his sentence doing hard labor.

In July or August 1915, 39-year-old Kim was released on parole. He wanted to resume teaching, but his status as a political prisoner prevented him from doing so. Instead, he engaged in farming.

== Exile in Shanghai (1919–1932) ==
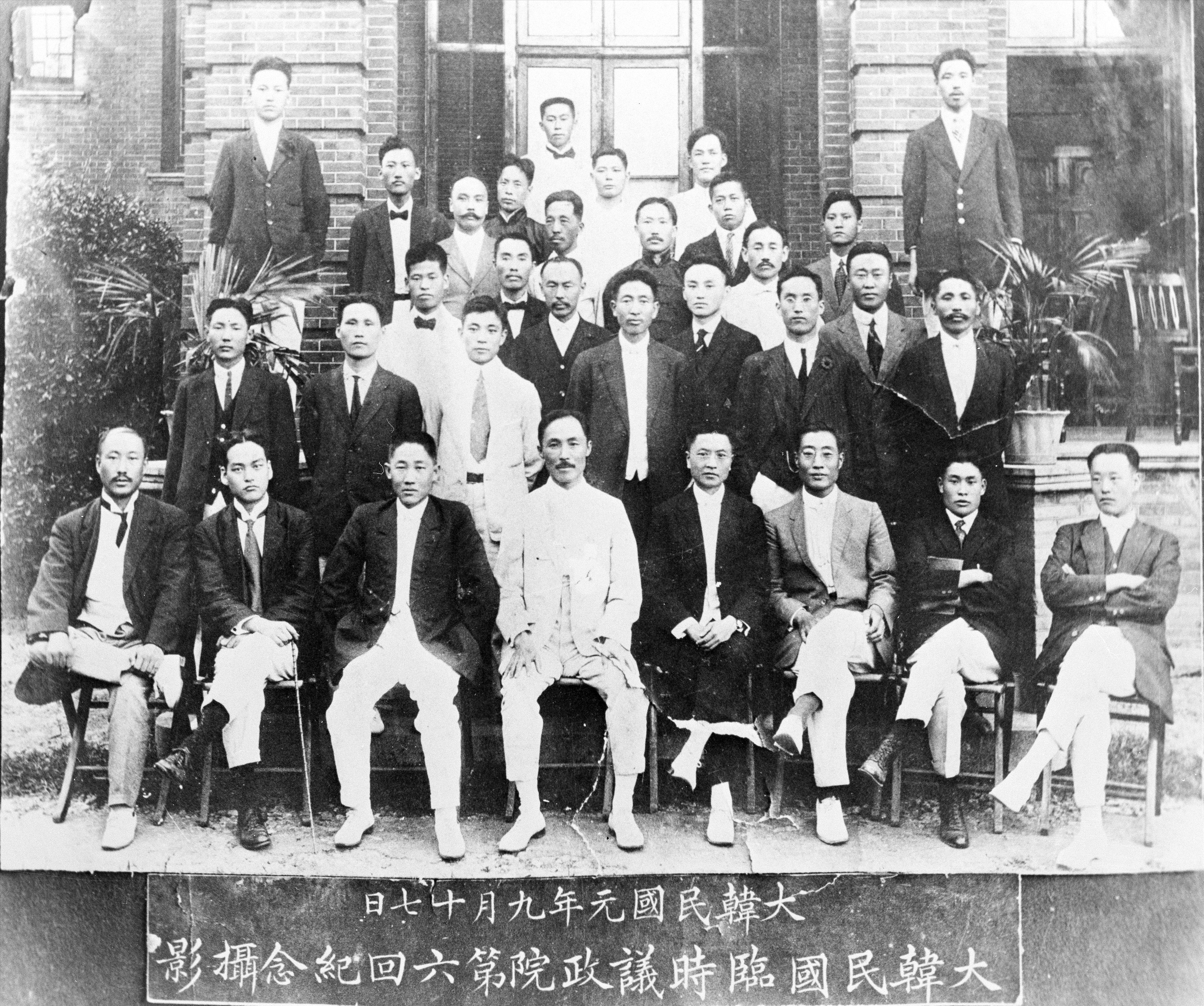
Photo commemorating the closing of the 6th meeting of the Provisional Korean National Legislature (임시의정원). Kim is on the second row from bottom, far right (September 17, 1919)

On March 1, 1919, Kim participated in a nationwide non-violent protest now known as the March First Movement that was violently suppressed by Imperial Japan, resulting in thousands of deaths and tens of thousands of arrests. Kim and many other Korean nationalists soon left the country to escape from Japanese authorities. This movement is widely considered a catalyst for the Korean independence movement, and is now remembered as a national holiday in South Korea.

=== Early Provisional Government (1919–1926) ===
On March 29, 1919, Kim began a train journey to Shanghai, China in order to join the Korean Provisional Government (KPG). He arrived on April 13, and was appointed police commissioner. He would spend the next 13 years hiding in Shanghai, never leaving the city the entire time. In September 1919, the first president of the KPG, Syngman Rhee, was elected, and Kim made the Chief of Staff.

The KPG was highly unstable for much of its history. It constantly dodged Japanese intelligence agents and Korean spies who betrayed them for various reasons. Kim executed a number of traitors and collaborators during his time as commissioner. In order to avoid detection by the Japanese authorities, the government moved often, renting buildings from sympathetic people in the French concession, the British concession, and from the Kuomintang. Numerous positions were created then dissolved within a few years. Kim and many others often served in one or more positions for just a few months until moving onto a new one. For example, in April 1924, Kim moved on from his position of acting Prime Minister to concurrently serving as Minister of Internal Affairs and as Minister of Labor.

The KPG and its members also consistently dealt with funding issues. They acquired most of their funding from the Korean American community, which numbered around 7,000 and dealt with its own funding issues. The KPG struggled to pay rent and salaries, which proved to be a source of constant friction and fracturing inside of the group. On August 29, 1925, Na Seok-ju sold his clothes in order to buy a birthday gift for Kim's 49th birthday. Kim remembered that he himself was unable to afford celebrating his mother's 60th birthday (in Korean age) in 1919, and was so ashamed that he decided to no longer celebrate his own birthday.

The KPG also suffered from a political divide between its left and right leaning members. In 1923, a faction of communists funded by the Soviet Union attempted to split off their own government, but failed to do so due to their own infighting. Kim was aligned with the KPG's other main faction, the pro-American Christians.

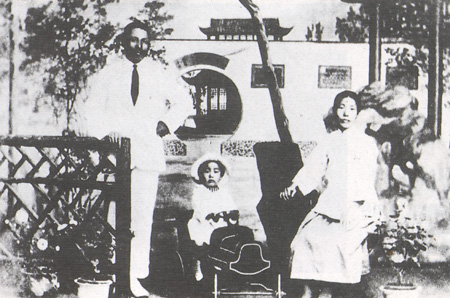
Kim, with son In and wife Chun-rye in Shanghai (1921)

Kim's family life was difficult during this period. On January 1, 1924, just two years after the birth of his fifth child, Shin, his wife died. Because Kim was a wanted man, he was unable to visit her in the hospital before she died. According to a 2012 interview with Shin, Kim then temporarily placed Shin in an orphanage, as he could not take care of him while working. In November 1925, his mother and Shin returned to Korea to avoid interfering in Kim's work. Eventually, in September 1927, his eldest son In would also return to Korea.

=== First term as president and government instability (1926–1930) ===
The group also suffered from internal conflict. In March 1925, Syngman Rhee was impeached over allegations that he abused his power. From then until December 1926, leadership changed rapidly, as seven heads of state served and resigned. Most only served a few months, with Ahn Changho serving fewer than two weeks due to being unable to form a cabinet. Rhee left to the United States shortly after his impeachment. In 1928, Kim sent letters to him, asking for donations to the KPG, which Rhee refused on the grounds that he too was suffering from financial difficulties. Despite the KPG's support from sympathetic foreigners, they were largely ignored by the governments of the United States and China. However, the KPG eventually managed to secure support from the Chinese government after Kim organized the Korean Patriotic Organization in 1931.

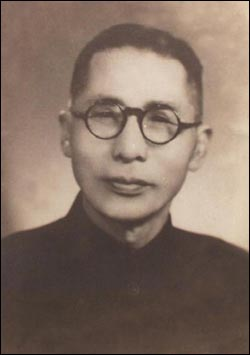
Kim in 1930

From December 14, 1926, to August 18, 1927, Kim Ku served as head of government. In late March 1927, shortly after beginning his term, he reorganized the office of president (국무령) into "Chairman of the State Council Directory" (국무회의 주석), where the chairman is the first among equals in a state council. Robert S. Kim attributes this to why Kim's term as head lasted longer than that of others; Kim served around eight months before leaving office. He became the Minister of Internal Affairs again after leaving office, and Yi Tongnyŏng became the head of government. Yi served for two three-year terms, until 1933; the first president since 1925 to serve for longer than a year.

In May 1929, he completed the first volume of the Diary of Kim Ku, when he was around 53 years old. Around this time, he made and gifted unique copies of the volume as thanks to several donors, including organizations of the Korean-American community and Ho Chong. In 1930, Kim established and became the head of the Korea Independence Party, in an effort to unite the right-leaning members of the government. The party would last until 1970, albeit as a minor party after his death in 1949.

=== Korean Patriotic Organization (1931–1932) ===
In 1931, Kim became the founding leader of the Korean Patriotic Organization (KPO), which was dedicated to the assassination of important Japanese imperial and colonial personnel. The organization was created in response to recent events and the perceived stagnation of the independence movement. The KPG also wanted to improve the relationship between China and Korea, due to heightened tensions between the two after the 1931 Wanpaoshan Incident. The KPO's cause was seen as so urgent that it received around half of the budget of the KPG.

==== Sakuradamon incident ====
On January 8, 1932, KPO member Lee Bong-chang attempted an assassination of Emperor Hirohito in Tokyo, in what became known as the Sakuradamon incident. Lee threw a grenade that missed the Emperor's carriage. He was later executed on October 10.

==== Hongkou Park Incident ====
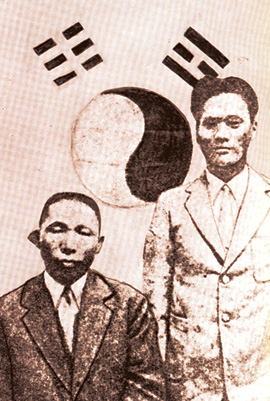
Kim (left) and Yun Bong-gil, in front of the flag of the KPG. On April 29, 1932, Yun detonated a bomb in Hongkou Park (Lu Xun Park) in Shanghai that killed several high-ranking Japanese military officials (April 27, 1932)

On April 29, member Yun Bong-gil detonated a bomb that killed and wounded several Japanese military and colonial leadership in Shanghai's Hongkou Park. Among the dead was Commander in Chief of the Shanghai Expeditionary Army General Yoshinori Shirakawa. After a botched suicide attempt at the scene of the crime, Yun was captured and later executed on December 19.

== Infamy and escape (1932–1937) ==
After the Shanghai bombing in late April, Kim became infamous. In order to avoid putting other Koreans at risk, Kim sent statements to various newspapers in Shanghai in which he claimed personal responsibility for organizing the KPO's activities. Various Japanese government bodies put bounties on him worth a combined 60,000 Dayang (Chinese: 大洋), an enormous sum for that time.

With this, Kim began a flight across China that would last until 1939 and rival the length of the famous Long March. First, the American Presbyterian missionary George Ashmore Fitch, a friend of Kim's and many others in the Korean independence movement, hid Kim and several others at his house in Shanghai. Fitch wrote in his 1967 autobiography of this event:

The night of this incident Kim Koo [sic] and three other Korean patriots came to our home in the French concession, and for thirty-one days were our upstairs guests while the Japanese and French police combed the city for them. It was not until the second day after their arrival that they told me that Kim Koo had both made the bomb and trained the young man in placing it--but I did not worry my wife by disclosing the fact at the time. I always had a high regard for Kim Koo and not a little affection, and I was glad at the end of their stay when the coast seemed clear, and I was able to smuggle all four in my car to safety across the line into Chinese territory.

When the Japanese came close to finding him, Kim escaped by pretending to be an American couple with Fitch's wife.

=== Jiaxing, Haiyan, and 'marriage' (1932) ===
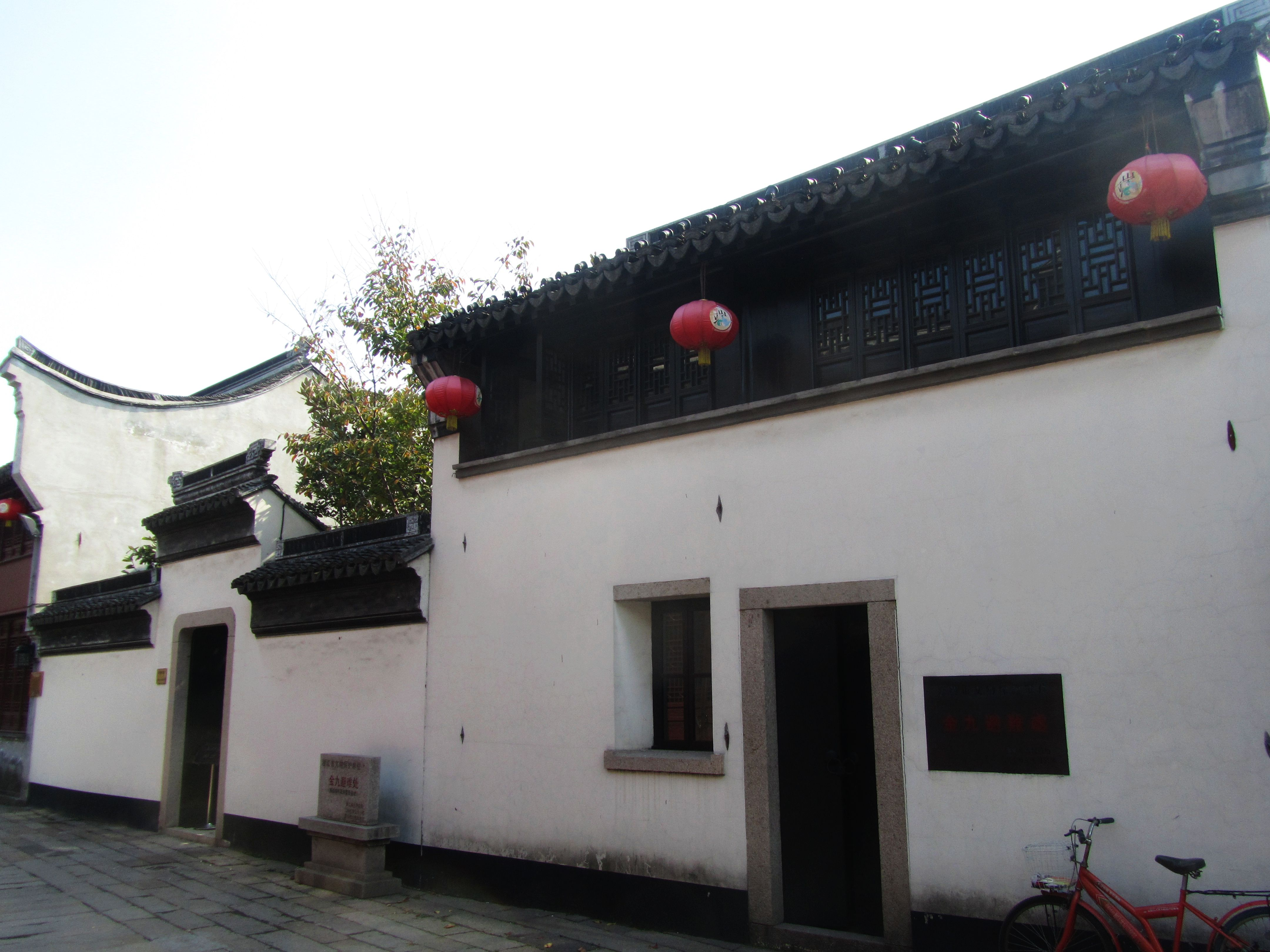
Kim Ku's first hideout after escaping Shanghai. The stone memorial to Kim can be seen in front. (2013)

A Chinese sympathizer named Chu Fucheng helped Kim and others escape to a hiding place at 76 Meiwan Street (梅灣街) in Jiaxing. The building had numerous features to facilitate hiding, including false closets, hidden doors, and a boat docked underneath the house. It still exists to this day, with a memorial at the spot. He borrowed his grandmother's maiden name and assumed a false identity as a Cantonese man. (Note: He used the names Chinese: 長震球; pinyin: Zhǎng Zhènqiú; Jyutping: coeng4 zan3 kau4 or 長震; Zhǎng Zhèn; coeng4 zan3)

Meanwhile, the other members of the KPG left Shanghai in May 1932, and moved their headquarters to Hangzhou. They remained there until November 1935. Around June 1932, Kim resigned from the KPG in acknowledgement of the fact that he would not be able to adequately perform his duties while on the run.

In the summer, after witnessing Japanese authorities at Jiaxing station questioning locals on Kim's whereabouts, Chu moved Kim to his daughter-in-law Zhu Jiarui's (朱佳蕊) house at Zaiqing Villa (載靑別墅) in Haiyan county. Here too now stands a memorial of Kim's time there.

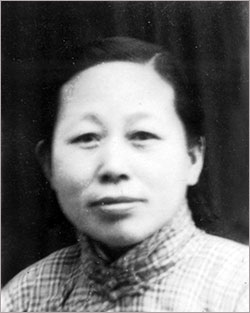
Zhu Aibao, Kim's 'wife' for five years. After sending her back to her hometown in November 1937, Kim never saw her again.

In order to make up for Kim's poor Chinese-speaking skills, Zhu proposed that he marry a local Chinese woman. She suggested he marry one of her friends, a middle school teacher. However, Kim thought a teacher would be too intelligent and might figure him out, and instead proposed marrying the 20-year-old owner of the boat he often rode, named Zhu Aibao (朱愛寶; 주애보). They had a 37-year age gap. While they never officially married, they were functionally husband and wife, and began to live together on her boat.

Ironically, being on the run in Haiyan was one of the most peaceful times of his life after his exile. Although he still participated in independence-related activities, he enjoyed the time outside of work. When he lived in Shanghai, he had rarely spent time outdoors. Here, he embarked on regular hiking trips and spent time with Zhu. He even came to view her as his actual spouse. In his autobiography, he wrote that he felt bad about deceiving her and not being of much financial help. They had a relationship for around five years total. It remains unclear whether Zhu ever knew about Kim's true identity. After November 1937, he never saw her again. Later, Kim's descendants attempted to locate Zhu Aibao or her descendants, but were unable to.

=== Three assassinations and an attempted fourth (1933) ===
In the second half of 1933, three successful assassinations and an attempted fourth occurred in Shanghai that were all connected to Kim. The targets were all pro-Japanese Koreans. Ok Kwanbin was assassinated at the behest of Kim on August 1, a pro-Japanese police officer investigating Kim was killed on August 17, the head of the Shanghai Korean Friends Association (상해한국인친우회; 上海韓國人親友會) survived an assassination attempt on August 31, and Ok's cousin was assassinated on August 18.

=== Beginning of support from the Kuomintang (1933–1937) ===
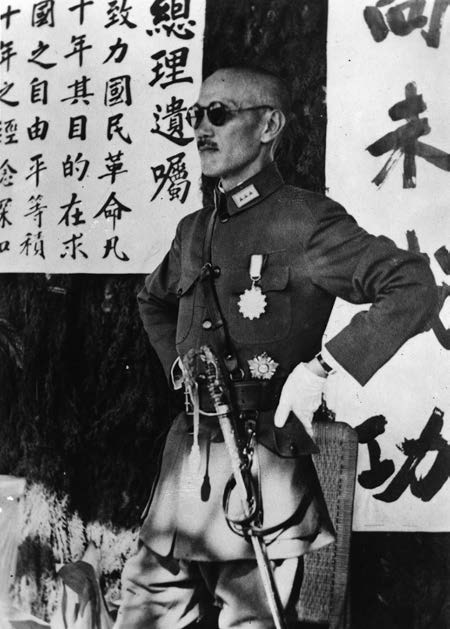
Chiang Kai-shek in 1932

Around July 1932, Kim requested a meeting with Chiang Kai-shek, with the intent to ask for help in establishing a cavalry training school for the numerous Koreans in Manchuria. Chiang agreed to meet Kim, but was skeptical of the viability of the cavalry school.

Around September 1932, (Note: There is scholarly disagreement on when Kim and Chiang first met, and it is apparently unclear from Kim's autobiography. Most sources say the meeting happened around May 1933. However, Son Se-il says it happened around Sept/Oct 1932.) they met at the Whampoa Military Academy in Nanjing. According to Kim's autobiography, after exchanging verbal pleasantries, Kim picked up a brush and wrote in Chinese: (Note: "선생께서 100만원의 돈을 허락하시면 2년 이내에 일본·조선·만주 세 방면에서 대폭동을 일으켜서, 대륙침략을 위한 일본의 교량을 파괴하겠습니다. 선생의 생각은 어떠하십니까?")

If you give me 1,000,000 yuan, within two years I can cause such chaos in Japan, Korea, and Manchuria that it will destroy Japan's 'bridge' to invading the mainland. What do you think of this?

The next day, Chiang responded with a counterclaim that terrorism and assassinations had their limits, since Japan could always replace personnel. After some negotiations, they compromised; Chiang agreed to pay Kim 5,000 yuan per month, offered to hide him from the Japanese, and allow him to train Korean resistance fighters in the Luoyang branch of the Republic of China Military Academy. In addition, 40 horses were to be provided in order to train a cavalry unit. Although somewhat disappointed by the lack of a Manchurian school, Kim was elated to have a stable source of revenue. He then spent much effort in trying to recruit young Korean fighters.

=== Beginning to train independence fighters (1934–1935) ===
In February 1934, Kim became one of the administrators of the 17th Army Officer Training Class of the 4th Battalion (제2총대 제4대대 육군군관훈련반 제17대), around 30 km north of Luoyang. The KPG class was named and presented as if it were yet another all-Chinese class (the previous 16 classes had graduated only Chinese students), in order to avoid detection from the Japanese. Training covered topics such as tactics, weapons, politics, communication, physical education, riding, and shooting. They trained with great urgency, as there was a prevailing sense that a second Sino–Japanese conflict and/or World War would begin within one to two years.

There were 92 students in total. Kim had made a special point of recruiting the armed forces of the 1930 Korea Independence Party (different from Kim's party and later army; 한국독립군; 韓國獨立軍; lit. 'Korea Liberation Army'). These fighters had sided with Chinese forces during the Japanese invasion of Manchuria. Also in attendance were 20 students of the Chosŏn Revolutionary Military and Political Officers School (조선혁명군사정치간부학교; 朝鮮革命軍事政治幹部學校) in Nanjing. Kim had not been the first to receive funding and military training support from the Kuomintang. Kim Won-bong, former leader of the Shanghai-based Heroic Corps, had been training students in Nanjing since October 1932.

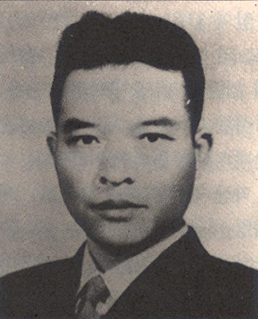
Kim Won-bong, the left-leaning leader of the rival Korean National Revolutionary Party (KNRP), and rival of Kim Ku (1931)

The training had several difficulties. One of the most notable issues was infighting. The leftist beliefs of Kim Won-bong and his followers clashed with the KPG's general rightist tendencies. The two Kims would later become rivals. Even amongst the right-leaning students, two factions emerged. One supported Chi Ch'ŏngch'ŏn, and the other Kim. In addition, one of the students, Yeom Dong-jin, went on to develop an intense dislike of Kim Ku and become a key part of ongoing conspiracy theories surrounding Kim's eventual 1949 assassination.

Around June, Kim's funding from the Kuomintang was cut in half. In addition, Japanese authorities began to zero in on their Luoyang training location, and so they had to temporarily relocate to a temple. Around August, 25 students, including Kim's son In, were expelled by order of Kim and either placed on special missions or into regular Kuomintang military classes. Around September, four trainees were caught and arrested by Japanese authorities in Nanjing. By October, training activities greatly slowed. In December 1934, he created a special forces division (한국특무대독립군; 韓國特務隊獨立軍) for the remaining trainees, which came to be known as the "Kim Ku Club" (김구구락부).

On April 9, 1935, the school stopped after only operating for about a year. Of the original 92 students, 62 graduated. The school was closed for a variety of reasons, including internal conflicts between left- and right-leaning members and January 21, 1935, negotiations between the Kuomintang and Japanese governments.

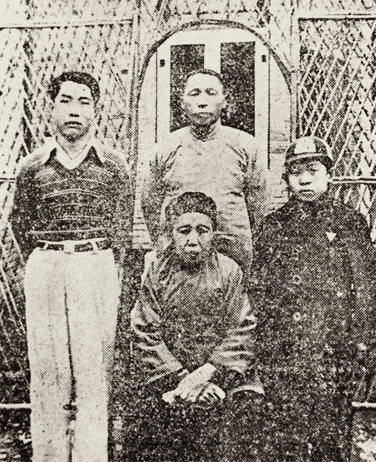
Kim Ku's family, reunited after 9 years. Clockwise from top center is Kim, his younger son Shin, his mother Kwak Nagwŏn, and his elder son In (Nanjing, 1934).

After courses began, he invited his mother and sons to return to China. His stable income, protection from the Kuomintang, and the advanced age of his mother (75) motivated this decision. With assistance from independence fighters such as Kim Sŏn-ryang (김선량; 金善亮), they secretly took a boat from Pyongyang to Dalian, another to Shanghai, and finally a train to Jiaxing. In early April 1934, Kim reunited with his mother and two sons in Jiaxing for the first time in nine years. They went together to Nanjing, where Kim had prepared a house for them.

=== Infighting in the Provisional Government (1933–1935) ===
As a result of the bombing, the assassinations, the flight of KPG members from Shanghai, and the increasingly intense searching of the Japanese, the independence movement was thrown into chaos. Much of the KPG stopped functioning, and internal infighting amongst those who stayed in Shanghai intensified.

In January 1933, Kim's Independence Party voted to remove all of the absent leadership, except for Kim. Despite the fact that Kim had resigned from the KPG in the previous year, they kept him on out of respect. Regardless, he functionally did not play much of a role in the party between his escape and 1934.

The KPG moved its headquarters several times during this period. On October 3, 1933, the Provisional Assembly held its first meeting in a year at Hangzhou, delayed due to the chaos and the vacant chairman position. Four people attended. On January 2, 1934, they held another meeting in Zhenjiang. This time, they elected all new members, but Kim was not a candidate. Thus, after almost 15 years of serving in the assembly, Kim lost his seat.

In mid-1935, a significant split in the KPG emerged while Kim was busy with training students. A majority of the KPG, including Kim Won-bong, Jo So-ang and Kim Tu-bong, began advocating for the dissolution of the KPG and all parties, in favor of creating a single-party government. This came to pass in July, as several parties, including a breakaway group of Kim's party, unified into the Korean National Revolutionary Party (KNRP) under Kim Won-bong's leadership. Kim Ku opposed the dissolution of the KPG and saw one-party rule as infeasible, as internal tensions were only growing and not shrinking. He openly criticized the KNRP in multiple public letters. After two years of absence, he rejoined the KPG and united what remained of it into the Korean National Party (KNP; 한국국민당; 韓國國民黨) around November. The more right-leaning KNP aligned itself with the United States and the left-leaning KNRP more with the Soviet Union. Even graduates of Kim's military school ended up divided along factional lines, and joined various organizations afterwards. The two parties competed fiercely for the support of the broader Korean community and the Kuomintang, publishing public letters and newspapers to advocate their positions.

== Second Sino–Japanese War (1937–1945) ==
In early July 1937, the anticipated China–Japan conflict began in earnest. On July 15, the KPG met to plan their involvement in the conflict. They saw it as a critical opportunity to achieve independence. On August 9, the KPG approved a plan to set up a training camp and train an army that included 200 junior officers. Their planned budget for 1938 was 226 times larger than their 1937 budget, with military expenditures accounting for 98% of it. They expected to receive most of their funding from the Kuomintang, and the remaining approximately one-fifth via donations from the international Korean community. However, these efforts were a failure, as none of their plans came to fruition due to their following the retreat of the Kuomintang across China.

=== Flight from Nanjing to Changsha (1937–1938) ===
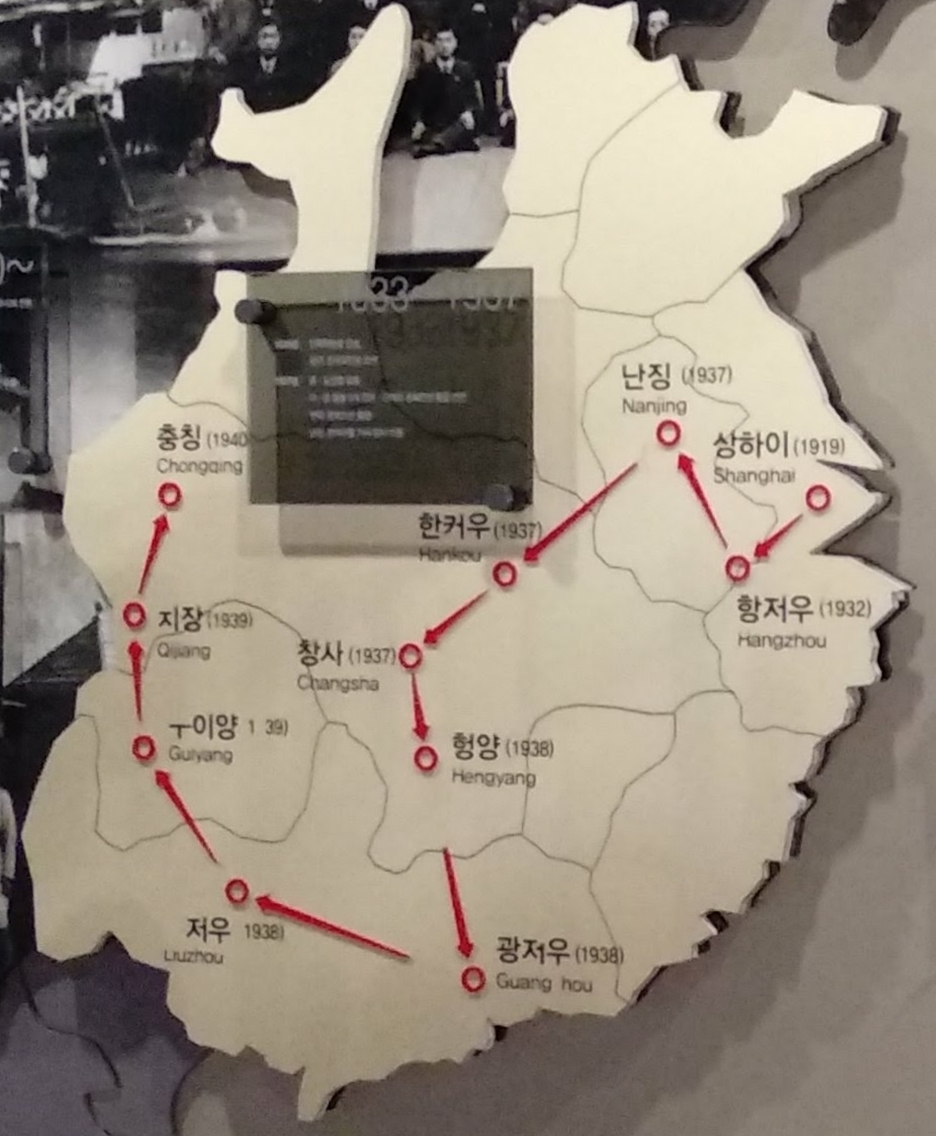
Map depicting the KPG's flight across China, which began with their escape from Shanghai in 1933 and ended with their settling in Chongqing in 1939 (2017)

On August 17, 1937, the various parties of the KPG finally united into a coalition. The Japanese began air raids on Nanjing, which Kim experienced on August 26. Around this time, he stayed in a small town near Nanjing in order to avoid being captured by Japanese agents, who expected him to be in the city. In early November, Japanese troops began approaching Nanjing. The Kuomintang began moving to Chongqing on November 16, and the KPG to Changsha on November 18. They chose Changsha because of its lower cost of living and its proximity to Hong Kong, through which they could contact the outside world. They also decided if the war got even worse, they could relocate from there to Hawaii.

Kim set about coordinating and funding the evacuation of around 120 people, including KPG personnel and their families. Kim planned to retrieve An Jung-geun's widow from Shanghai by sending one of An's brothers after her, but the brother returned with only his own family. Kim continually worried about her safety for the rest of the KPG's escape. He also lamented only being able to provide just 100 yuan for Zhu Aibao, his 'wife', to return to Jiaxing. They never saw each other again. Kim then took his younger son and mother on a British steam ship to Hankou, then another boat to Changsha. Just three weeks after their departure, the Japanese perpetrated the infamous Nanjing Massacre.

By December 20, the KPG completed moving its personnel to Changsha. Finances became tighter, as receiving aid from the Kuomintang or expatriate community became more difficult, and because the other income streams of KPG members were severed. However, they adjusted by housing multiple families together. In spite of these difficulties, their time in Changsha was initially relatively calm. As they were temporarily safe from Japanese agents, Kim openly used his name for the first time since his arrival to China almost two decades earlier. Around this time, his mother celebrated her 80th birthday (Korean age). He wanted to throw her a party, but she refused it. Instead, she demanded that Kim use the money, that would have otherwise been spent on her, to purchase a pistol for Korean fighters. He obeyed her request.

==== Shot in Changsha (1938) ====
Relationships between various parties improved drastically after their move to Changsha, and many found common ground. On May 5, Kim proposed a dinner for the cadres of several parties, around 10 people total.

On May 7, they held the dinner on the second floor of a building in Changsha. Spirits were high, and the group exchanged jokes. Around 6:20 pm, a young man burst in and fired four shots from his pistol. Youths downstairs began rushing up to apprehend the culprit, but he escaped by jumping from the second floor. The first bullet hit Kim, the second Hyŏn Ikch'ŏl, the third Ryu Tongnyŏl (류동열; 柳東說), and the fourth Chi Ch'ŏngch'ŏn. Of the four people shot, all recovered, except Hyŏn, who died that day and was later buried on Yuelu Mountain.

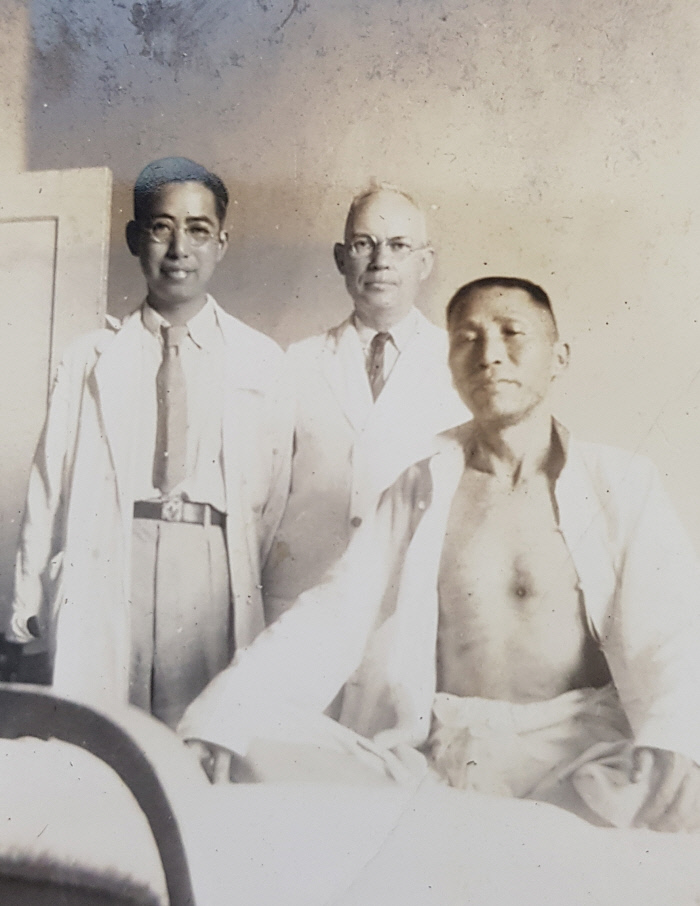
Kim (rightmost), recovering in Xiangya Hospital after being shot (May 1938)

Kim was shot in the left chest and lost consciousness. He was taken to the Xiangya Hospital (湘雅醫院), but the doctor refused to accept him, saying there was no hope for treatment. Telegrams about the shooting were urgently sent to others in the independence movement, which caused some people to immediately disembark to Changsha, with the expectation that they'd be attending a funeral. But Kim continued breathing, and after three hours a doctor finally relented to seeing him. Kim survived the shooting.

The culprit was 30-year-old Yi Unhwan (이운환; 李雲煥; 李雲漢). He was known for being brash and uncompromising, and had even been expelled from the KNRP just two months earlier after rumors circulated that he wanted to assassinate various party leaders. His stated motivation was that he was dissatisfied with the direction the KNRP was taking. Six days later, he was arrested by Chinese police at a rural train station dozens of kilometers away and sentenced to death. But he escaped from his imprisonment and was never recaptured.

When Chiang Kai-shek heard of the incident, he sent a telegram to Kim's hospital and requested they take good care of him. When Kim came to, he had no memory of what had happened. The doctor told him his injury was the result of him drunkenly falling on a table, which Kim believed. It was only until his release a month later that he learned the truth. The bullet remained in his chest for the rest of his life and affected his movement. After his release, he told his mother what had happened. She reportedly calmly replied, "You know God is protecting you. Evil cannot hurt the just ("邪不犯正"). But what's regrettable is that [the shooter] was Korean; being shot by a Korean and living is worse than being shot by a Japanese ("일인") and dying". (Note: "자네 목숨은 하나님께서 보호하시는 줄 아네. 邪不犯正[사불범정: 사악한 것이 옳은 것을 범하지 못함]이지. 하나 유감스러운 것은 이운환 정탐꾼도 한인인즉, 한인의 총을 맞고 산 것은 일인의 총에 죽은 것보다 못하네")

=== Arrival in Chongqing (1938–1940) ===
After Kim's release from the hospital, he spent the rest of the year managing the relocation of around 400 KPG members and family. Changsha became unsafe, as Japanese air raids intensified and refugees poured in. The KPG initially moved to Guangzhou, but after a few months, the Japanese began to encroach yet again. They finally decided to move to Chongqing to be with the Kuomintang leadership, abandoning their plan of staying near Hong Kong. Throughout this time, they were under constant threat of the Japanese, and narrowly escaped capture several times. On October 26, Kim arrived in Chongqing, ahead of much of the KPG and their family. There, he coordinated travel, sent requests for funding abroad, and coordinated with the Kuomintang and local Chinese governments.

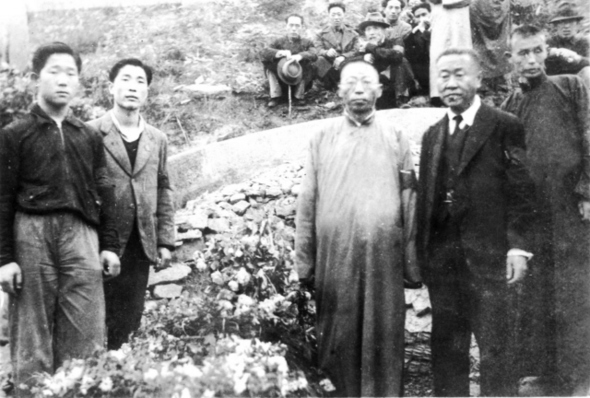
The funeral of Kwak Nagwŏn, Kim Ku's mother. From the left is youngest son Shin, eldest son In, Kim, and Kim Hong-sŏ (April 26, 1939)

In early 1939, Kim learned that his mother had contracted pharyngitis while traveling, and that her health was deteriorating. He rushed to her bedside in Chongqing, but she could not be saved. Feeling her end was near, Kwak Nagwŏn gave her final wish to her son: "Hurry and succeed in your independence work. After you do, take the ashes of myself and In's mother and bury them in our homeland". (Note: "어서 독립이 성공되도록 노력하고, 성공하여 귀국할 때에 나의 유골과 仁이 어미 유골도 가지고 돌아가서 고향에 묻어라") She died at 10:50 am on April 26, 1939. She is currently buried in the Daejeon National Cemetery in South Korea, along with In.

Their time in Chongqing was to be difficult. Kim described his time here as his "Dying Period" (「죽어가는 시대」). The population of Chongqing was below 500,000 before the war, but after the Kuomintang and other refugees moved there, it surged to over 1,000,000. Housing was constantly in short supply, and regular Japanese bombing runs made the situation even worse. Kim frequently had to allocate money from their already-stretched budget for constructing or maintaining housing for KPG members and their families. From 1938 to 1945, around 70 to 80 Koreans died of pneumonia due to poor air quality, high humidity, and poor access to healthcare. Among them was Kim's eldest son In, who would die in 1945. Kim himself suffered from thiamine deficiency during this period, and spent many days hiding in bomb shelters and seeing trucks overflowing with dead bodies. Despite all this, the KPG actually lived relatively comfortably compared to much of the Chinese population of Chongqing, as the majority of Chinese families had even less reliable access to food and shelter.

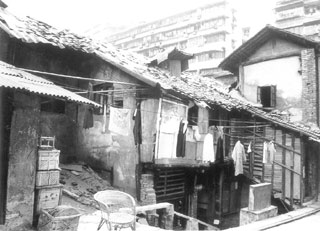
The KPG's shabby third office in Chongqing. (Note: Located at 1 Heping Street, Wufu Street, Wu Shiye Alley.) Used from 1941 until it was destroyed by Japanese bombings in 1944.

They moved office buildings four times, after each building was destroyed by Japanese bombings. Their second office building was so severely destroyed on September 2, 1940, that not even a single article of clothing could be salvaged from it. Their third office was damp, dark, and had no plumbing, so they placed a bucket in a corner to urinate in. They would use this office for four years (until January 1945), the longest they used a building since Shanghai. While there, around March 1942, Kim would finish the second volume of his autobiography, the Diary of Kim Ku.

==== Failure to unite the independence movement (1939–1940) ====
After his arrival in Chongqing, Kim began work on integrating the various parties. Despite arguing against integration four years ago, the war had changed his mind. Another significant motivation for this was to appease the Kuomintang leadership, who were disappointed in the movement's continued infighting, epitomized in the Changsha shooting incident. The Kuomintang had even mediated several integration talks in 1937, which failed.

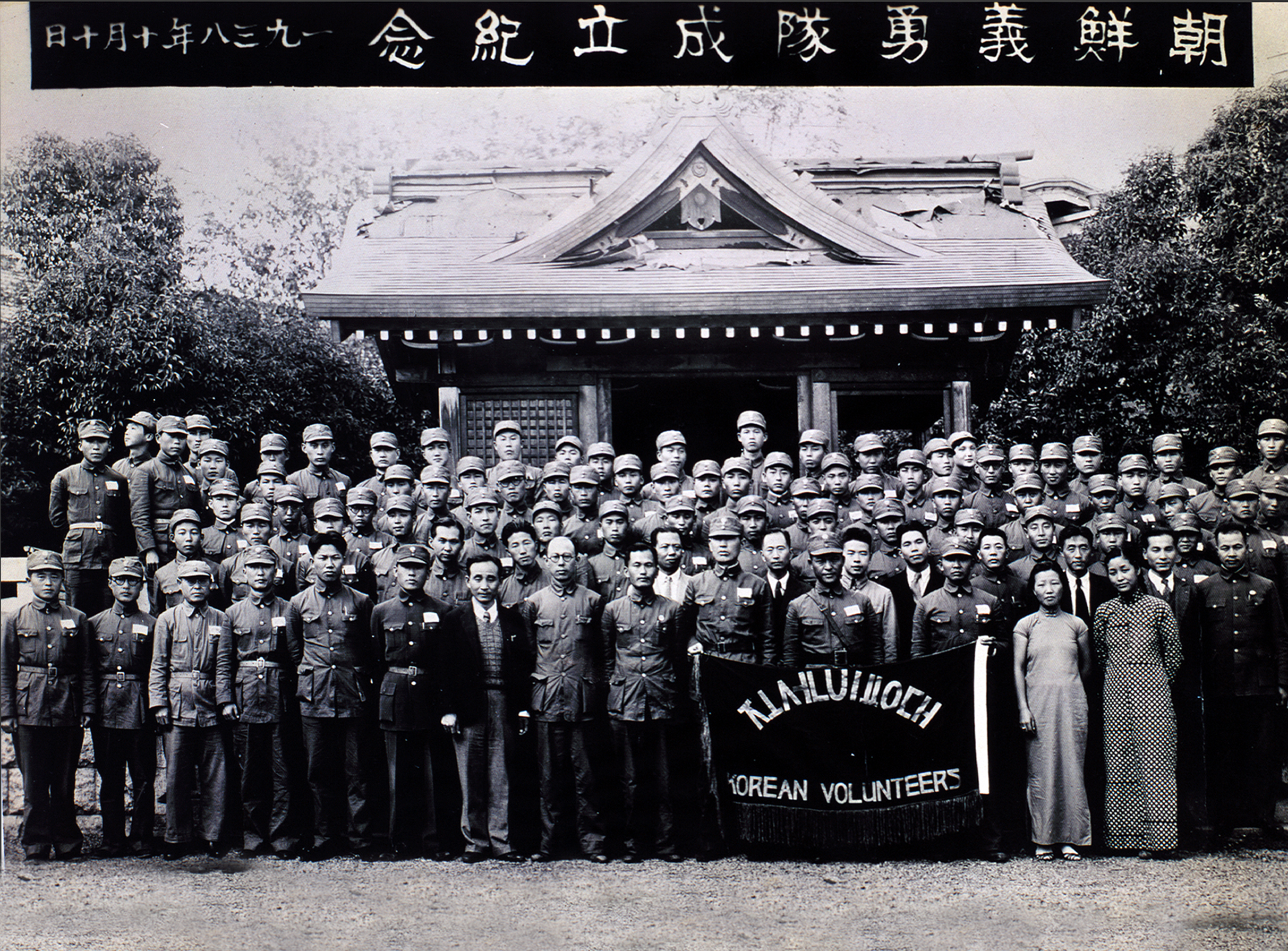
Kim Won-bong's Korean Volunteers Army (October 10, 1938)

In particular, Kim sought to unify with Kim Won-bong. Unlike Kim Ku and the KPG, Kim Won-bong and the KNRP had actually succeeded in raising an army. On October 10, 1938, Kim Won-bong had created and became commander-in-chief of the first Korean armed forces in China, the Korean Volunteers Army (조선의용대; 朝鮮義勇隊). The army, with the help of Japanese Communist Kazuo Aoyama, managed to raise 100 soldiers and funding from the Kuomintang. By February 1940, they would have 314 soldiers.

In early 1939, they began negotiating their merger in earnest, but sides had somewhat flipped since 1935; Kim proposed a single party, while the left-leaning groups wanted a multi-party government. After several meetings, on May 10, the two Kims released a joint statement (동지·동포 제군에게 보내는 공개통신) advocating for a one-party government and listing ten shared ideals for the liberated Korea. The shared ideals included topics such as gender equality, ending feudalism, land redistribution, and creating free compulsory education. On August 27, their parties participated in the Korean Revolution Movement Unification Seven Group Meeting (한국혁명운동통일 7단체회의) in the Qijiang District of Chongqing, although the two Kims did not personally attend. Two of the seven parties withdrew from the conference after refusing to unite. The remaining five agreed to unite in principle, but talks broke down over the specifics of the merger. They disagreed on who would command the armed forces and to what extent they should collaborate with the right-leaning Kuomintang. Shortly after the breakdown of the talks, Germany invaded Poland, and World War II began.

After talks broke down, the Kuomintang representative at the meeting evaluated the two Kims as follows: (Note: "한국 당파의 영도인물로서 그 성망으로 군중을 따르게 하는 비교적 영도력이 있는 자는 金九와 陳國斌[김원봉의 별명] 두 사람입니다. 전자는 도덕성과 성망, 그리고 고난을 무릅쓰고 분투하는 정신은 혁명을 족히 영도하겠으나 재간[지략] 면에는 약간 부족한 것 같고, 후자는 재간은 약간 앞서나 도덕성과 성망 면으로는 전체 당인을 영도하기는 좀 어려울 것 같습니다.")

Among the various Korean party leaders, there are two people who have the relative leadership skills and reputation to lead the various Korean parties: Kim Ku and Kim Won-bong. The former has strong morals, is hardworking, and is well-regarded, but lacks in ingenuity. The latter is slightly better with ingenuity, but lacks in morals and renown, and would struggle to lead a unified government.

Kim placed the blame of the collapse in negotiations on the left-leaning parties, an assessment that the right-leaning Kuomintang generally agreed with. In a later January 1940 letter, he predicted that if right and left failed to find common ground now, the Korean peninsula would be "stained red with blood" in the future. The Kuomintang was continually frustrated with the lack of progress. They decided on January 19, 1940 to take a more active role in mediating unification talks, and pushing for unification even if it meant excluding some left-leaning parties. In the meantime, on April 2, the Kuomintang met with the various Korean parties. There, they firmly proposed that the left and right leaning groups coexist, but operate in different territories. The KPG would operate between the Yellow River and the Yangtze River, and the KNRP south of the Yangtze. The proposal was accepted.

On March 13, 1940, the sitting KPG President Yi Tongnyŏng died of pneumonia. Lee died at age 70, and had served around 12 years total as the head of government. Kim became head of government after Lee's death. Kim was crushed, and read an emotional eulogy at Lee's funeral on March 17. On April 1, the parties within the KPG unified into the Korean Independence Party, and on May 11, Kim was elected Chairman of the Executive Committee.

=== Creating the Korean Liberation Army (1939–1942) ===
On November 11, 1939, the KPG announced a plan, created by Jo So-ang, to create an army. The plan called for 110,000 party members, 1,200 officers, 100,000 soldiers, and 350,000 guerrillas raised after four years, totaling 541,200 personnel across six countries. It had an astronomical price-tag of 70.18 million yuan. By contrast, the total budget of the KPG in 1939 was 29,123 yuan. The South Korean historian Son Se-il described the plan as "wildly removed from reality", (Note: "「방략」은 현실과는 너무나 동뜬 이상론이었다") and called Jo and the State Council that approved the plan "hopeless utopians". Once Kim took the reins of creating the army, he took a more realist approach.

On April 11, 1940, Chiang approved Kim's proposal for creating a KPG army, albeit with funding granted only depending on immediate needs. However, a disagreement between the Kuomintang and Kim arose, as Chiang wanted the army to be subordinate to the Kuomintang army, and Kim wanted greater independence in order to establish the army's credibility and legitimacy. The Kuomintang pulled out of the deal, refusing to provide funding. Kim moved forward anyway with creating the army.

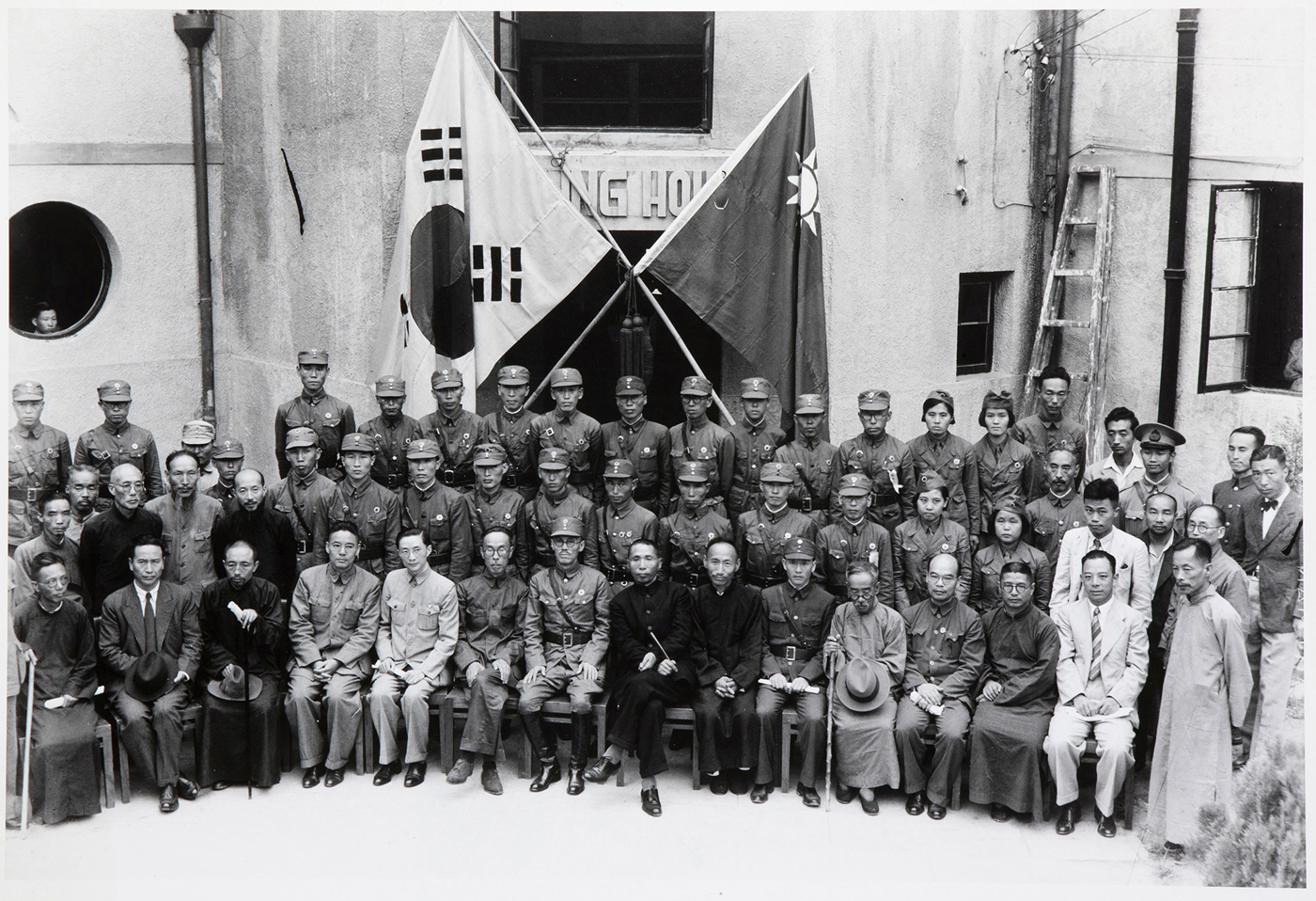
The inauguration of the Korean Liberation Army. Kim Ku is in the center of the bottom row (8th person from the left; September 17, 1940)

On September 17, 1940, the formal establishment of the Korean Liberation Army (KLA) was announced. General Chi Ch'ŏngch'ŏn was to be its commander. (Note: Robert S. Kim writes that Cho Seong-hwan was to be its commander.) They held a ceremony at then-luxurious Jialing Hotel (嘉陵賓館), in order to establish the army's credibility and reputation. It was held early in the morning, at 6 am, as to avoid Japanese air raids. Over 200 people were in attendance, including foreign ambassadors and Kuomintang officials.

The KLA became a rallying point for the Korean-American community, and donations came in greater volume. The San Francisco-based Sinhan Minbo newspaper regularly and prominently reported on the KLA's activities. Kim and many others in the KLA were adamantly convinced that around 30 million Koreans on the peninsula would eventually rise up against the Japanese and support the KLA's cause.

In September 1940, Kim was handily reelected as head of government, and he would hold this post until his return to Korea in 1945. On October 8, the KPG modified its constitution, with particular intent to reorganize the chief executive to have greater power in order to account for management of a standing army. Thus, Kim became the Chairperson of the State Affairs Commission (국무위원회 주석). This position was no longer considered first among equals, and instead entailed being commander-in-chief of the army, having veto power, and being able to issue executive orders. On November 12, the KLA announced their intent to switch from guerrilla warfare to conventional battle. They also moved their headquarters to Xi'an around this time. They began carrying out covert operations, recruiting youths, and publishing Chinese and Korean language newsletters. By January 1, 1941, they created five divisions, with over 100 people in the fifth division alone.

==== Difficulty gaining Kuomintang and US support ====
The Kuomintang put off formally recognizing the KLA for months and providing support for even longer, to Kim's dismay. The KLA had been growing rapidly, as hundreds of Koreans from all over China flocked to join, but the soldiers sat idle and underfunded. In February 1941, the Kuomintang even ordered its armed forces to block or restrict KLA activities. However, they began easing up around March, and by May 28, 1941, formally recognized the KLA. But aid was still slow to come. One reason for this delay was Kim Won-bong's interference, as he viewed the KLA as competition, especially because the Volunteers Army was subordinate to the Kuomintang and because the Kuomintang and KLA were more politically aligned. Another reason was concern about international pushback, particularly from the United States and the Soviet Union, by approving the KLA.

The US government hesitated on approving not just the KLA, but also the KPG. Kim sent multiple letters to President Franklin D. Roosevelt asking for the establishment of formal KPG–US ties, including one sent via President Roosevelt's son, James Roosevelt, who visited Chongqing in July. But these were all ignored. Especially after the December 1941 attack on Pearl Harbor, many in the US government were actually open to supporting Korean independence, but were cautious because of how it could impact the Pacific War, how it could cause other independence movements to demand US support, and because of the internal political division amongst Koreans. Around December 1941, the KPG declared war on Japan.

The US rejected proposals to recognize the KPG on multiple occasions. In April 1942, in a presentation to President Roosevelt, Chinese foreign minister T. V. Soong outlined their plan to merge the KLA and various militant Korean groups into an irregular army of around 50,000 men. These men would conduct guerrilla operations and eventually enter the Korean peninsula. Afterwards, as part of the plan, the US would eventually recognise the KPG as the rightful Korean government. However, in early May, the US responded by saying it was favorable towards the irregular army but rejected sole recognition of the KPG. As a result, the Kuomintang abandoned efforts to persuade other governments to recognize the KPG.

Chiang, Roosevelt, and Prime Minister Winston Churchill at the Cairo Conference (November 25, 1943)

In mid-1942, the Allies began secretly discussing placing Korea into a trusteeship after the conclusion of the war. Rumors of this eventually began circulating amongst the Korean independence movement, resulting in anger and disappointment. On November 27, 1943, the US, UK and China announced the 1943 Cairo Declaration, in which Korea "in due course" would "become free and independent". While there was initial excitement, they realized "in due course" could imply trusteeship, which infuriated Kim and many others. On December 9, 1943, Kim told an Associated Press reporter: (Note: "일본의 패전하면 한국은 즉시 독립돼야지 그렇지 않을 때는 상대가 누구든지 역사적인 독립전쟁을 계속하겠다")

If, upon the surrender of Japan, Korea is not immediately made independent, we will continue our historic war for independence, regardless of who our opponent is.

=== Kuomintang intervention, military and political unification (1942) ===
In May 1941, Kim Won-bong's KNRP began joining the KPG, albeit to much conflict. Later attempts for KNRP members to get elected into the National Council were highly controversial, and resulted in fist fights and nullified elections.

In early 1942, Kim became aware that the Kuomintang had been privately negotiating with Kim Won-bong to absorb the two dozen officers of the Korean Volunteers Army in Chongqing into the KLA. Kim Won-bong relented to this, on the condition that he become the deputy commander (부사령), a position that did not yet exist in the KLA.

On May 13, the KPG relented and approved the merger. Thus, the Korean Volunteers Army became absorbed into the KLA. This decision displeased both sides. Kim Ku protested to the Kuomintang in multiple letters, insisting they avoid directly interfering in the KLA's affairs. Kim Won-bong reportedly cried and drank all night on May 15, and delayed taking up his position until December 5. In an effort to gain greater control over the KLA, the Kuomintang quickly began reducing funding and placing numerous Chinese officers in vacant KLA administration positions. This effectively made any significant military activities impossible.

On October 9, Chiang effectively softened his stance by laying out a plan to handle the Korean independence movement, in which they would initially provide one million yuan of funding to the KPG, provide relative autonomy for the various Korean parties, and assure Korea that China would consider its independence first before any other country. Shortly afterwards, on October 11, the Kuomintang finally managed to unify the various parties by itself joining a coalition called the China–Korea Cultural Association (중한문화협회; 中韓文化協會). The KNRP had a relatively weak showing in KPG elections. Kim and others in the Independence Party were elated at these developments, as it somewhat met their original goals and also signaled their victory over the KNRP.

=== Infighting and reconciliation (1943–1945) ===
==== Alleged assassination attempt and funding conflict ====
On May 15, the Independence Party announced that there had been an assassination attempt on Kim and Independence Party leadership. They alleged that Kim T'ak (김탁; 金鐸; Chinese name 王通) and Kim Sŭnggon (김승곤; 金勝坤; 黃民) bribed Pak Subok (박수복; 朴守福) to help them steal a handgun from KPG security guards in order to kill Independence Party leadership and increase KNRP power. They also alleged other KNRP leadership were involved.

Kim Sŭnggon and Park Subok were arrested by KPG security. The former escaped and alleged that he was tortured into giving a false confession. On the morning of June 10, KPG security stormed into KNRP offices to arrest Kim Tak, but he had already been evacuated. On June 21, the Chongqing Police took custody of Kim Sŭnggon and Pak Subok, but eventually released them due to a lack of evidence.

This incident damaged the KPG's reputation in Chongqing and increased internal tensions. The KNRP insisted it was a false flag operation. Shortly afterwards, the KNRP announced it suspected Kim and the Independence Party were withholding funds from them, and published pamphlets all over Chongqing and abroad with their accusations. Kim was infuriated and deeply embarrassed by this.

==== Resignation from KPG, return, and compromise ====
After a failed in-person mediation attempt by Chiang on July 26, (Note: The last time Kim and Chiang met in person was in 1933.) Kim and six others on the State Council resigned on August 31. As only four seats were filled, a quorum could not be reached, and KPG activities essentially froze. This development stunned the Korean American community and the Kuomintang. Son Se-il claimed that this act posed a tangible physical danger to Koreans in Chongqing, as the KPG managed security and housing efforts. On September 21, the seven withdrew their resignations and returned.

In early October, the 35th National Assembly meeting was one of the tensest in the KPG's history. The main goal was to change the constitution to accommodate the inclusion of the KNRP. The KNRP also quickly submitted a motion to impeach Kim and the current government and concurrently managed to convince 17 members of the Independence Party to resign. Debates ran so fierce and long, that the conference was extended until April 1944. The Kuomintang intervened by threatening to withhold funds from both sides if a compromise was not reached.

Finally, on April 11, they compromised on the constitutional amendment and agreed to not impeach. Kim was reelected head of government and Kim Won-bong as head of the Armed Forces; both were sworn in on April 26. Kim Won-bong's position was notably weakened, and he would continue to be excluded in other ways after this election.

==== Agreement with Kuomintang ====
On September 5, 1943, Kim met with Chiang and gave several requests, including public acknowledgement of the KPG as the representative government of Korea, greater independence of the KLA, and assistance for Koreans in Central Asia who had been deported in 1937. Other than independence for the KLA, much of the requests were either deferred or effectively denied by Chiang. Funding for the KLA remained so poor that it did not cover living expenses.

Many in the KPG decided they needed to expand their relationship with other Allied governments. In April 1943, the KLA decided to dispatch representatives to various Allied countries. Kim also continued sending letters advocating for Korea and offering KPG military support to President Roosevelt, including a congratulatory letter on June 17, 1944, after the successful Normandy landings. The KLA even sent soldiers to fight for the British Indian Army via the Kuomintang. On August 29, 1943, nine KLA personnel were sent to Calcutta. The Supreme Allied Commander South East Asia Command Louis Mountbatten requested more troops, so the Kuomintang reluctantly arranged for 16 more KLA personnel to go, but this was delayed.

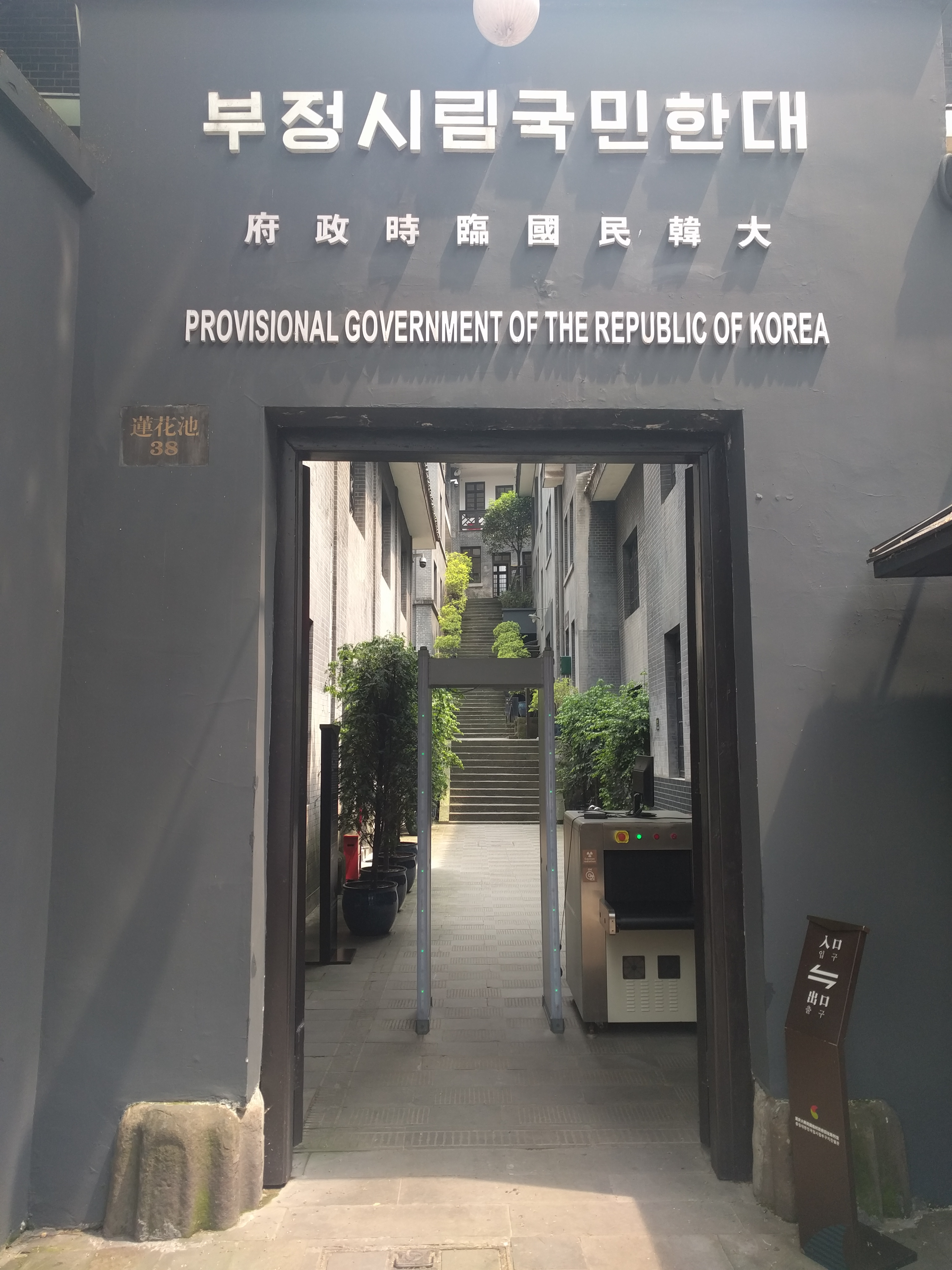
The KPG's final headquarters in Chongqing (2014)

Finally, on May 1, 1945, after a few months of negotiations, the KPG gained full control over the KLA under an agreement with the Kuomintang entitled Measures to Aid the Korean Liberation Army (원조한국광복군판법; 援助韓國光復軍辦法). The agreement also specified that the Kuomintang would fund KLA operations by loaning funds. This effectively allowed the KLA to more freely collaborate with other Allied countries.

=== Eagle Project (1945) ===
In September 1944, Lee Beom-seok, then Chief of Staff of the KLA, began discussing a plan to send Korean guerrillas to the peninsula with various members of the US Office of Strategic Services (OSS). (Note: Kim Won-bong was notably absent from the planning process; he was either excluded or he excused himself from these meetings. A controversy arose in May 1945, as Kim Won-bong protested to Independence Party and US officials about Kim Ku circumventing his authority. In response, General Albert Wedemeyer rejected Kim Won-bong's request for co-acknowledgement.) On February 24, the OSS completed a plan called the Eagle Project that was approved by US military headquarters on March 13. Kim's first meeting with Sargent was supposed to be on April 1, but on March 29, Kim's eldest son In died. Kim, Lee, and Sargent met on April 3, just north of Chongqing to discuss which operatives should be trained. Sargent's aide described Kim as follows:

President Kim entered the room, dressed in an attractive, plain Chinese gown, for which he apologized on excuse that he had not been well and was resting. In spite of his 70 years, which he showed completely in both appearance and manner, he bore himself with dignity and composure tempered by modesty and gentleness that seemed incompatible with the patriotic assassin and terrorist of 25 [sic, 13] years ago.

— Captain Sargent's aide-mémoires, April 1–3, 1945.

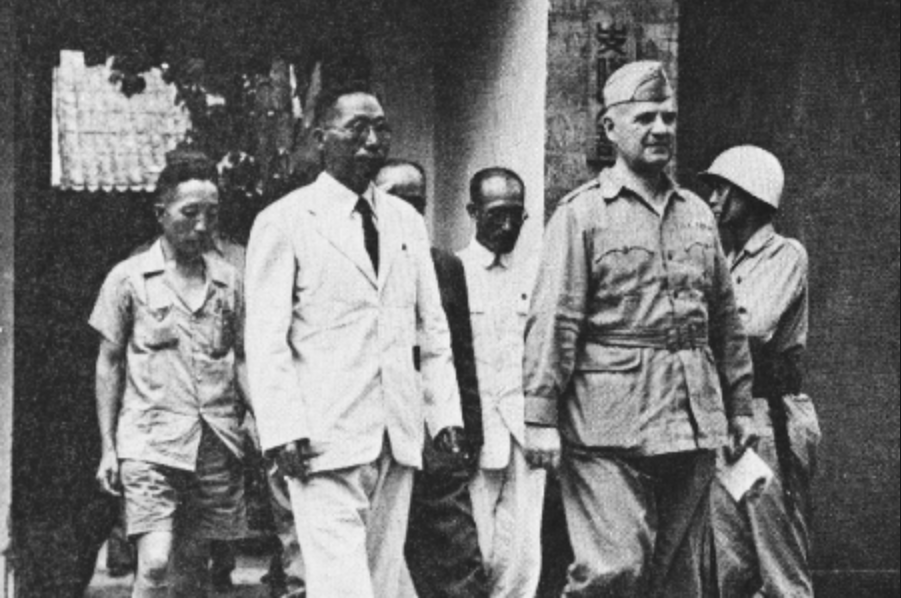
Kim Ku (front, left) and General Donovan (front, right) meeting in Xi'an (August 7, 1945)

Training began in mid-May and proceeded relatively smoothly. The first class was set to graduate in early August. Kim decided to go there and meet General Donovan and the graduates of the first class in Xi'an, and took a US military plane there on August 5. They met when Donovan arrived on August 7. Spirits were high at the meeting; Donovan reportedly said "Let both of our governments work closely together from now on", (Note: "앞으로 우리 정부와 당신네 정부가 긴밀히 일해 나가자") and Kim replied "General, you took the words right out of my mouth". (Note: "내가 말할 것을 장군께서 먼저 하신다")

Kim gave a telegram to Donovan that he wanted forwarded to President Harry S. Truman. On August 18, Donovan complied. A few weeks afterwards, Truman would send Donovan this response:

My dear General Donovan:

I consider it inadvisable to make any reply to the message transmitted by you on August 18, 1945, from Mr. Kim Ku who represents himself as the head of the "Provisional Government of Korea". I would appreciate your instructing your agents to the impropriety of their acting as a channel for the transmission to me of messages from representatives of self-styled governments which are not recognized by the Government of the United States.

Very sincerely yours,

— Harry S. Truman, Harry S. Truman to General William Donovan with Related Material, August 25, 1945, pg 1

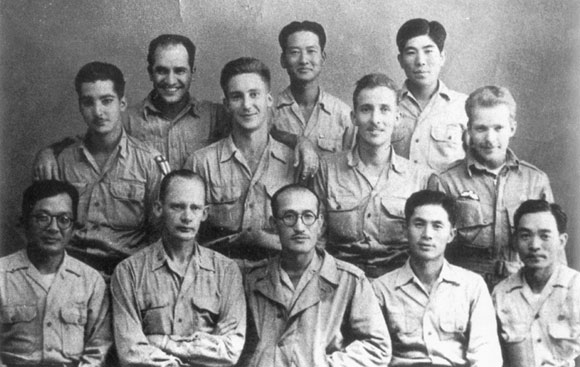
Photo commemorating the Eagle Project (September 30, 1945)

Kim later wrote that he was elated with how the meeting went, and that he was hopeful that the US would soon formally recognize the KPG. But around the time of the meeting, the US dropped the first atomic bombs on Japan, and less than a month later, Truman would dissolve the OSS.

== Return to Korea (1945–1949) ==
=== Departing China ===
On August 10, 1945, Kim learned of the surrender of Japan. He later described his feelings as such: (Note: "이것은 내게는 기쁜 소식이라기보다는 하늘이 무너지는 듯한 일이었다. 천신만고로 수년간 애를 써서 참전할 준비를 한 것도 다 허사다. [...] 걱정되는 것은 우리가 이번 전쟁에 한 일이 없기 때문에 장래에 국제간의 발언권이 박약하리라는 것이다.")

This felt less like happy news and more like the sky was falling. Years of trials and tribulations preparing for a war in vain. [...] [W]hat worries me is that because we have done nothing in this war, our voice on the international stage will be weak.

— Kim Ku, Diary of Kim Ku, vol II

Kim, Lee, and the OSS began formulating a plan to have a division of the KLA return to the peninsula to perform reconnaissance and intelligence gathering tasks for the US. Despite the urging of the KPG and the Kuomintang for Kim to return to Chongqing, Kim decided to stay in Xi'an until the mission was fully planned, and returned to Chongqing on the 18th. However, authority was eventually taken away from the Eagle Project, which caused it to end by August 30. Meanwhile, Kim focused on wrapping up the KPG's affairs in China while awaiting news from the Kuomintang and US.

In August 1945, Korea was haphazardly divided along the 38th parallel. By September 1945, the Soviet Union operated the Soviet Civil Administration in the north and the US the United States Army Military Government in Korea (USAMGIK) in the south. Meanwhile, the KPG continued to experience infighting. Politics in Korea were also fractured, with major factions in the USAMGIK including the right-leaning Korea Democratic Party (KDP), the left-leaning People's Republic of Korea (PRK), and the Communist Party of Korea (CPK). The US chose Syngman Rhee as their preferred candidate for leadership in the occupied Korea. Rhee was allowed to return to Korea on October 16 and immediately began attempting to unify the various parties. Leveraging the nearly universal respect towards him, he was able to form a joint committee entitled Central Council for the Rapid Realization of Korean Independence (CCRRKI) with representatives from across the political spectrum. Rhee hoped that Kim and the KPG would support this group upon their return.

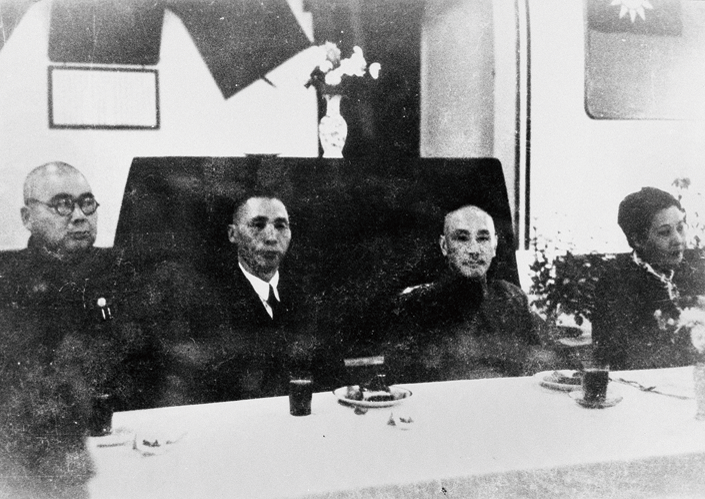
Starting from second from left, Kim, Chiang Kai-shek, and Soong Mei-ling at a farewell party for the KPG (November 4, 1945)

After a number of farewell banquets, Kim and some other KPG members first went to Shanghai on November 5. They were originally supposed to go to Korea on November 10, but the US asked the KPG members to sign documents affirming that the KPG was not returning as the government of Korea and only as private citizens. After weeks of angry deliberation, they signed the documents on November 19.

=== Arrival in Korea ===
On November 23, Kim and 14 others quietly arrived at Gimpo Airport in Korea and were taken to the building Gyeonggyojang, which Kim was to use as a residence. When news broke of his arrival, his residence was swarmed with jubilant crowds and parades were held in his honor. Kim, Rhee, the KPG, and CCRRKI initially mostly cooperated. However, Kim and others refused to dissolve the provisional government, which disappointed the US and Rhee. By December, these relationships deteriorated. The left-leaning PRK and CPK had a split with the right-leaning groups in the CCRRKI; this led to the US outlawing the PRK on December 12, although the PRK continued to operate in spite of this. In addition, while Rhee had initially shown interest in working with the left-wing groups, he began to harshly condemn them, which alienated him even from parts of the KPG.

==== Anti-trusteeship movement ====
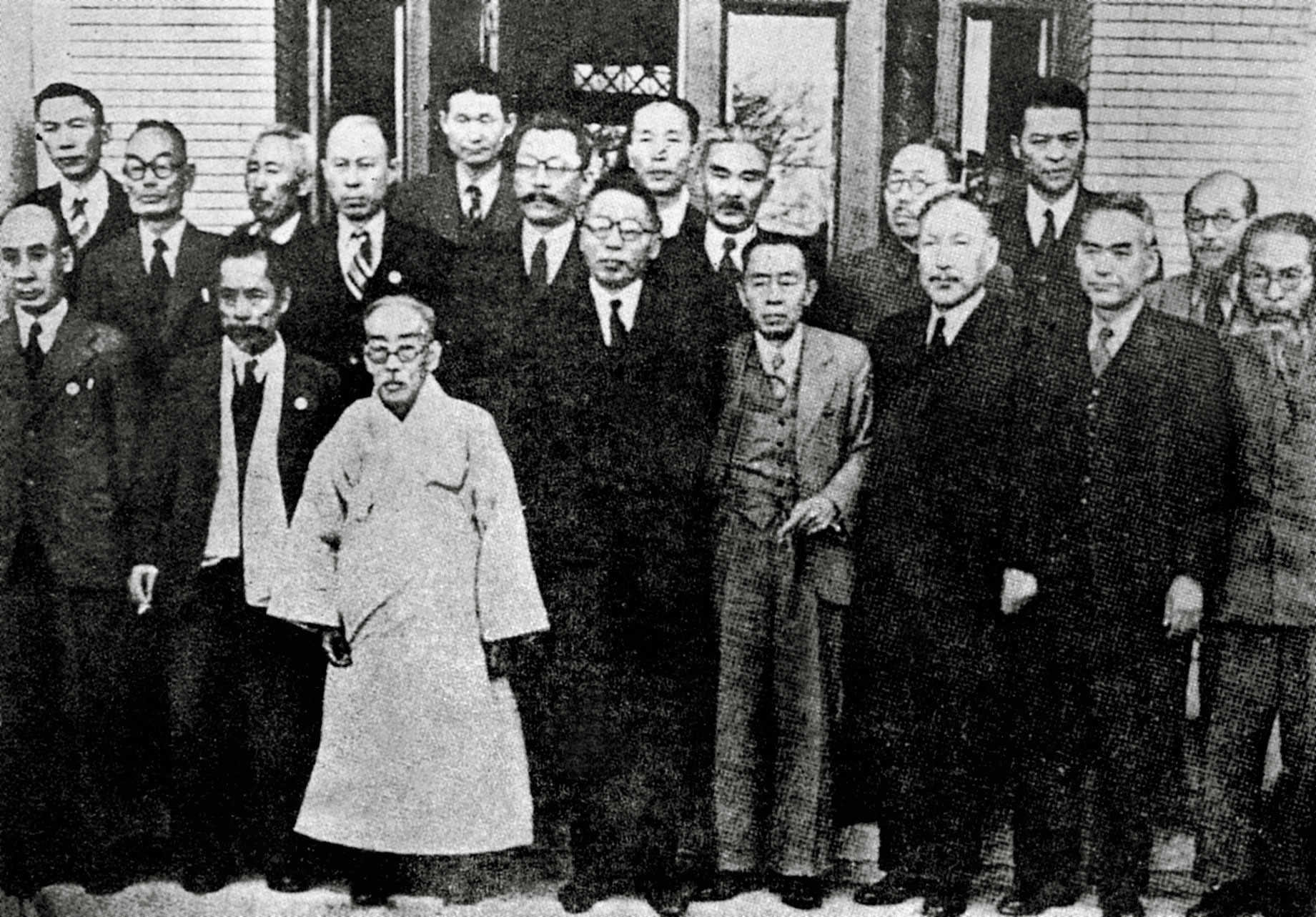
December 3, 1945. A photograph commemorating the return of the Provisional Government leaders with Kim Ku included

From December 16 to 26, 1945, the Moscow Conference was held, wherein the fate of Korea was a major topic. On December 28, it was announced that Korea was to be held in a five-year trusteeship. In southern Korea, this was met with immediate outrage, with nationwide strikes and protests. While Rhee begrudgingly accepted the news, Kim and others in the KPG began planning to resist the trusteeship. The KPG organized protests around the country. The left-leaning groups announced their support of the trusteeships and the Soviet Union, albeit with great internal dissent.

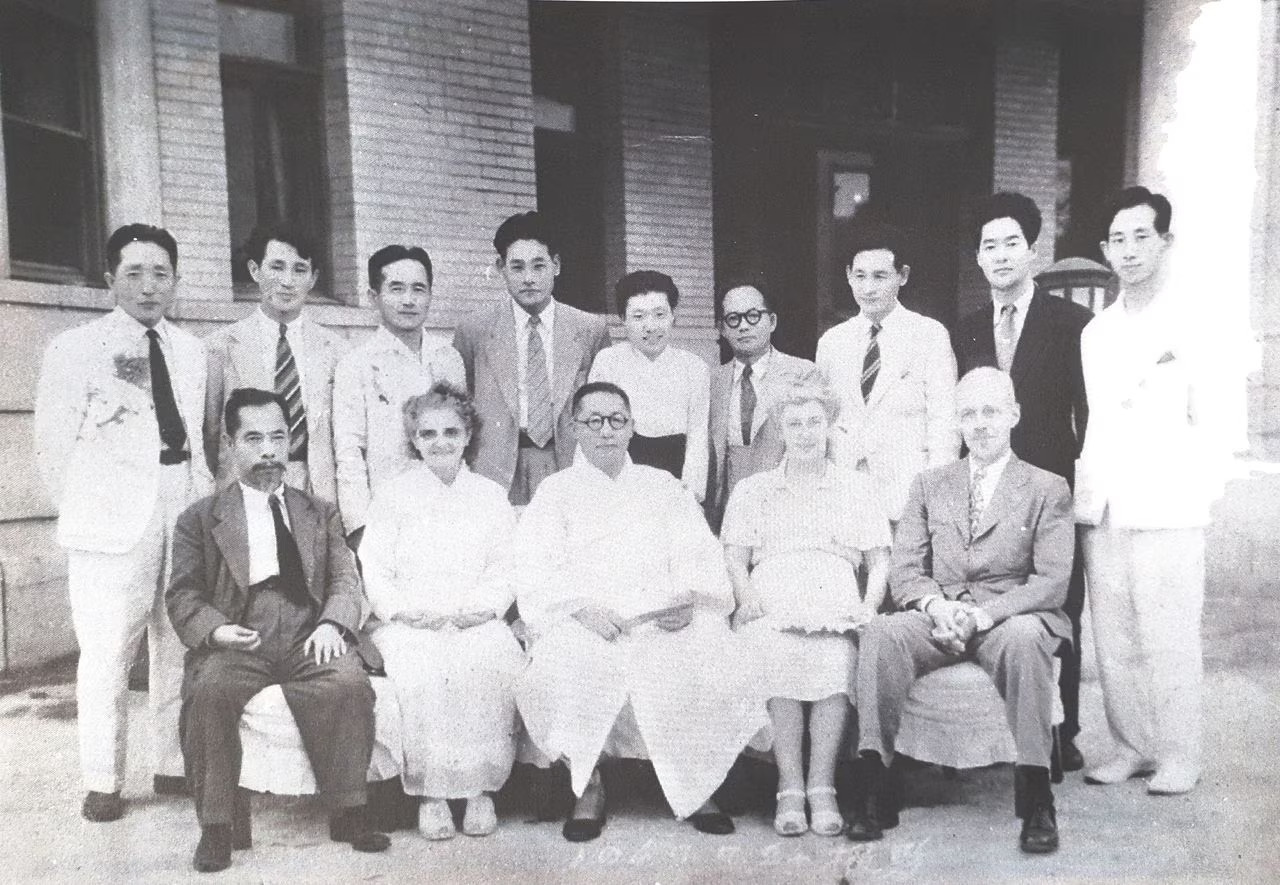
Kim Ku in a group photo, 1946

Likely with the approval of KPG leadership, the KPG's covert militant sub-organization Central Political Task Force (정치공작대; 政治工作隊) posted public announcements that it would undermine US control of the south in order for the KPG to take over. US military governor of Korea John Hodge was furious at this announcement, and initially wanted Kim and the KPG to be arrested and deported back to China, but decided against this. Hodge summoned Kim for a meeting on January 1, 1946. Hodge demanded Kim quash the plan, and said that if Kim went back on his word he would be killed. Kim reportedly initially defiantly replied that he'd kill himself before that could happen. He eventually relented, and announced later that day via radio that the KPG would be respecting US control. Son evaluated the KPG's plot as a blunder that alienated Kim from the US. The PRK and CPK were outraged by the KPG's announcement, and issued statements and held rallies condemning Kim and the KPG.

=== North–South conference (1948) ===
In mid-April 1948, Kim went to the North. As the division of the newly-independent ROK state under the trusteeship became obvious, Kim led a team of former independence activists to Pyongyang to hold unification talks with Kim Il Sung, who later became the Premier of North Korea in 1948.

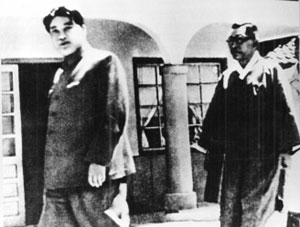
Kim Il Sung and Kim Ku (right; 1948)

While Kim Ku was still anti-Communist, he softened his stance in an effort to appease Kim Il Sung. In addition, many Koreans were then distrustful of the US, and unsure of whether the US would support South Korea in the event of a Northern invasion. In a 1985 interview with the Japanese magazine Sekai, Kim Il Sung claimed that Kim Ku asked him for political asylum in the event that his relationship with the US soured. Kim Il Sung then claimed that Kim Ku got on his knees and begged for forgiveness for his past anti-Communist actions. The truthfulness of the latter claim is doubted by several South Korean scholars.

Many of Kim Ku's contemporaries and modern critics were skeptical of his appeasement efforts. The Kuomintang Minister in Seoul rebuked Kim in a July 11, 1948, conversation, saying "damage has been done [...] by your recent activities in connection with the so-called North and South Korean Leaders' Conference held in Pyongyang".

Kim returned to the South deeply concerned that the North would handily win if it invaded the South.

In 1948, the inaugural Parliament of South Korea nominated Kim as a candidate for the office of the first president of the Republic. In the election by the National Assembly, Kim was defeated by Syngman Rhee, the first president of the Provisional Government, who had been impeached in 1925 by a vote of 180–16. He lost the election for the vice presidency to Yi Si-yeong by a vote of 133–59. Kim did not know about his nomination until after the election. He did not approve the nomination since he considered it a ploy to discredit him. Kim would never have participated in the election, as he fiercely opposed the establishment of separate governments in North and South Korea.

== Death ==
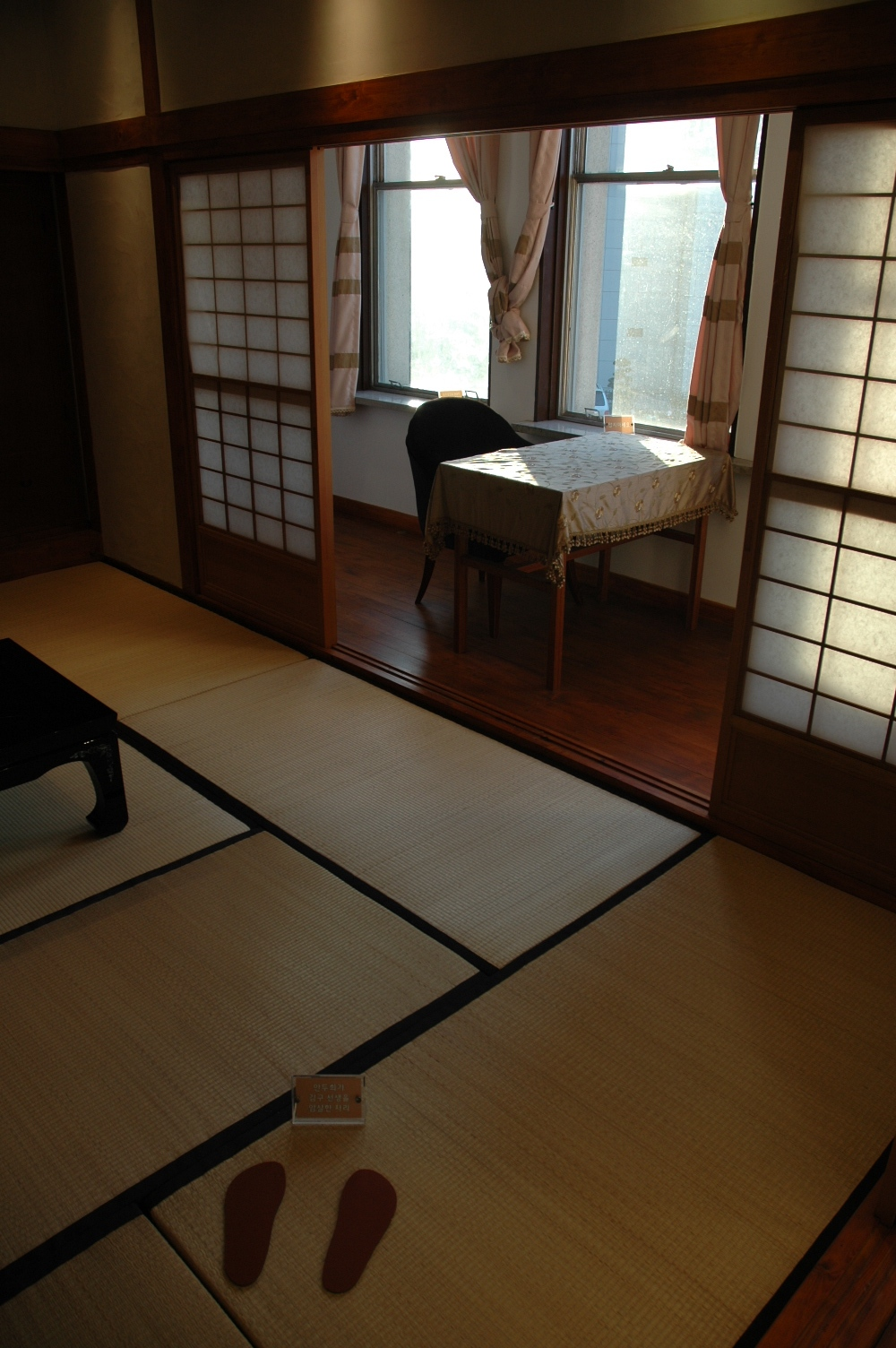
The room where Kim was assassinated. Ahn stood where the footprints are, and Kim sat at the small table. (2009)

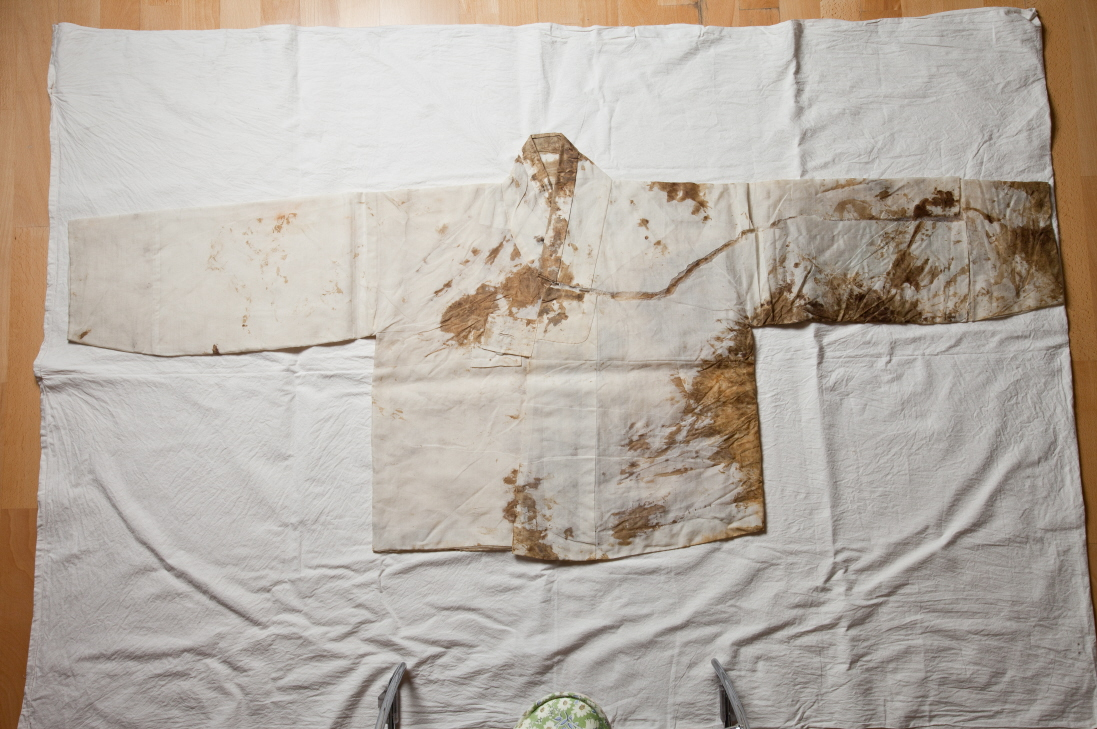
The clothes Kim wore upon his death, now a Registered Cultural Heritage of South Korea. (2011)

On June 26, 1949, while reading poetry in his office in the evening, Kim was shot four times by Lieutenant Ahn Doo-hee. He was pronounced dead at the scene.

Almost five decades later, in 1996, Ahn himself was murdered by Park Gi-seo (박기서; 朴琦緖), a bus driver and admirer of Kim Ku. The weapon involved in the murder was a 40 cm-long wooden rod, with "Stick of Justice" (정의봉; 正義棒) and "Reunification" (통일; 統一) written on it. In 2018, 70-year-old Park donated the stick, still faintly stained with the blood of Ahn, to the Museum of Japanese Colonial History in Korea.

=== Motive for assassination ===
Ahn stated that he had killed Kim because he saw him as an agent of the Soviet Union.

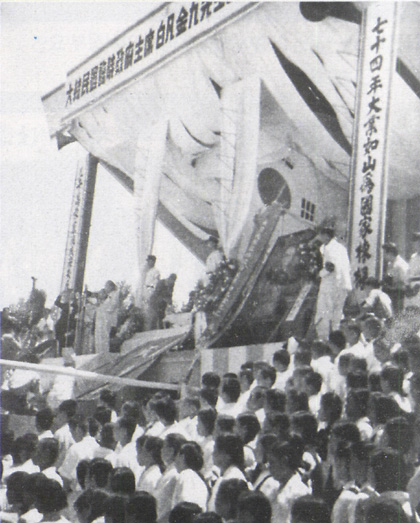
Kim Ku's funeral (July 5, 1949)

According to Bruce Cumings's 1981 book, another possible motive for the assassination was Kim Ku's alleged connection to the assassination of Song Jin-woo, a leader of the Korean Democratic Party (KDP), who had chosen to work closely with the American military government.

On April 13, 1992, a confession by Ahn was published by The Dong-a Ilbo. In his confession, Ahn claimed that the assassination had been ordered by Kim Chang-ryong, who served as the head of Rhee's national security. In 2001, declassified documents revealed that Ahn had been working for the U.S Counter-Intelligence Corps, leading to suggestions of American involvement in the assassination. However, some have questioned the evidence for those accusations.

== Legacy and honors ==
=== Diary of Kim Ku, his autobiography ===
His autobiography Diary of Kim Ku is an important source for the study of the Korean independence movement. It was designated cultural treasure No. 1245 by the Korean government on June 12, 1997.

=== Honors and awards ===
The street Baekbeom-ro in Seoul and Baekbeom Square Park on top of the mountain Namsan are named after him.

In 1962, Kim was posthumously awarded the Republic of Korea Medal of Order of Merit for National Foundation, the most prestigious civil decoration in South Korea. On August 15, 1990, North Korea posthumously awarded him the National Reunification Prize.

Harvard University has maintained a Kim Koo Professor of Korean Studies position since 2004. Since 2005, the Korea Institute of Harvard has held the Kim Koo Forum on U.S.–Korea Relations. Since 2010, another Kim Koo Forum has been held at Peking University. In 2018, a third Kim Koo Forum was established in Seoul, which is dedicated to research around Kim and the KPG. In 2012, Tufts University established a Kim Koo-Korea Foundation Professor in Korean Studies position. In 2009, the Kim Koo Foundation and Kim's great-granddaughter Jung Hwa Kim ('08) donated materials to Brown University to found the "Kim Koo Korean Collection".

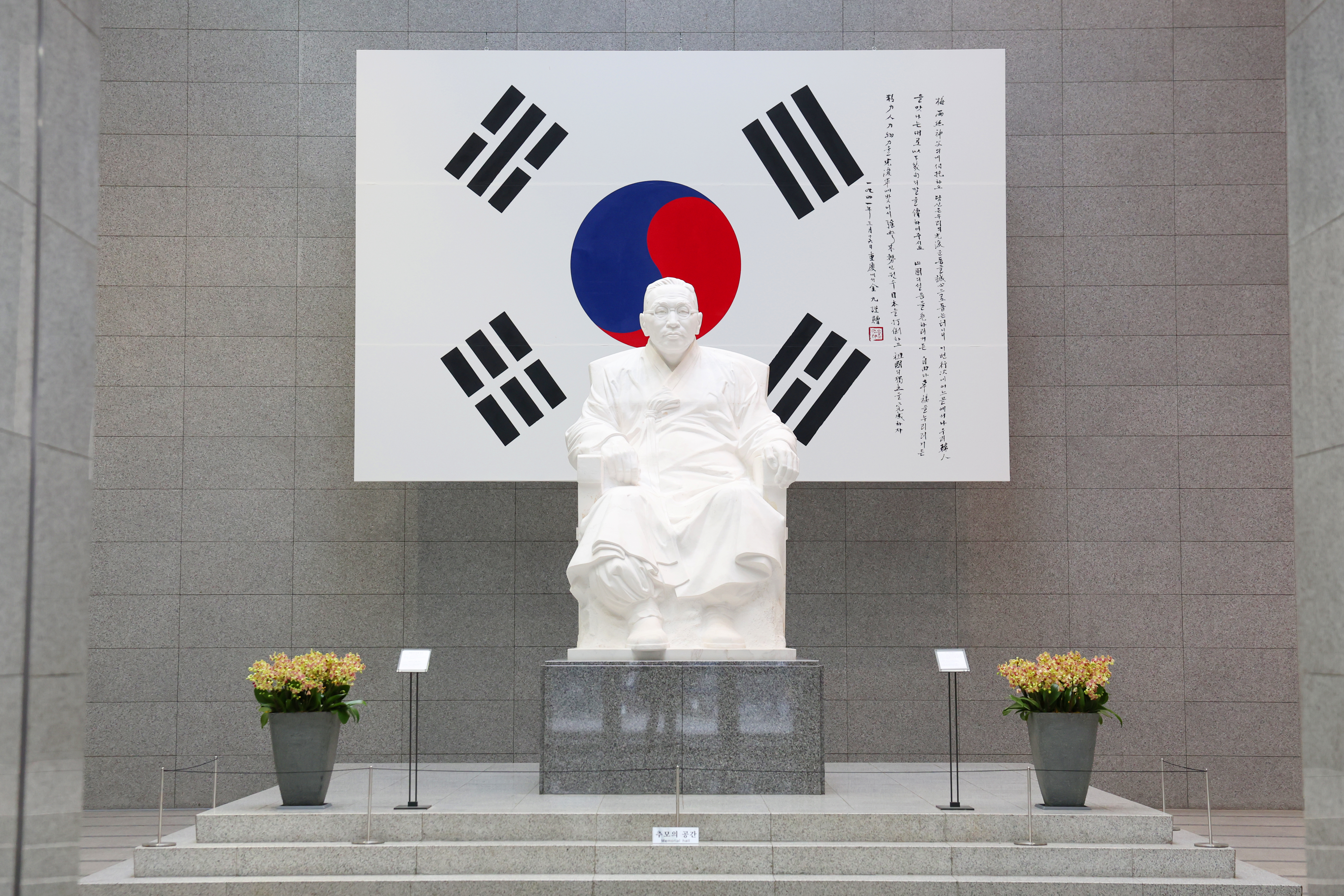
Statue in the Kim Koo Museum

On October 22, 2002, the Kim Koo Museum was opened in Seoul. The South Korean government considers several objects associated with Kim Ku to be objects of cultural heritage. This includes a South Korean flag with Kim Ku's writing on it, the bloodied clothes Kim wore upon his assassination, and calligraphy that Kim produced.

In February 2023, Starbucks Korea announced that it would donate a piece of handwritten calligraphy by Kim to the Korean National Trust for Cultural Heritage. It also released special edition tumblers depicting the calligraphy.

=== Public opinion ===
In South Korea, Kim has been consistently regarded as one of the greatest figures in Korean history. In a 2008 survey by Korea Research, 44% of respondents credited Kim Ku for establishing South Korea, above the first president Syngman Rhee.

In anticipation of the 60th anniversary of South Korea's founding, a national survey was conducted in 2007 on who should be portrayed on a new 100,000 Korean won bill, to be issued in 2009. On November 5, 2007, the Bank of Korea announced that Kim had won the vote. However, the new bill has been delayed indefinitely as of February 2023.

=== Characterization as a terrorist ===
For decades, there has been a debate in both academic and public settings over whether Kim can be considered a terrorist. On July 19, 2007, Anders Karlsson of the University of London drew controversy while guest lecturing at Korea University when he described Kim's Korean Patriotic Organization (KPO) as a "terrorist group", and the KPO's agents as "terrorists". This characterization was immediately challenged by students in the course. One student pointed out that, unlike in September 11 attacks, Kim did not recklessly target civilians. However, Karlsson reportedly stood by his usage of the description at the time, and university administration stood by Karlsson's qualifications. Word eventually spread to the JoongAng Ilbo, which reported on the incident. Karlsson then withdrew the description. He said that he used the characterization out of expediency, and acknowledged that the word "terrorism" carried significant unintended weight.

South Korean conservatives generally express more negative opinions about Kim, and have used this characterization as well. In 2009, an article in The Korea Times discussed a textbook it described as "ultra right-wing". The textbook called Kim a terrorist and a "left-wing politician who was against the founding of the Republic of Korea and made no contribution to the new nation". Park Geun-hye, then the leader of the Hannara Party and later President of South Korea, praised the textbook on May 26, 2008. Jeon Jeong-yoon, writing for The Hankyoreh, criticized the fact that only 5 pages of the book mentioned Kim, and most mentions were in negative contexts. Jeon noted that the book described Kim's activities in the KPO as "anti-Japanese terrorism" (「항일 테러활동」), which stood in contrast to the more common characterizations of "passionate struggle" (「의열투쟁」) and "independence activism" (「독립운동」). According to a 2014 editorial also published in the Korea Times, a government-approved history textbook that described Kim as a terrorist was adopted in 14 high schools, around 1% of the 1,393 high schools in South Korea.

Steven Denney and Christopher Green wrote in Sino-NK that the KPO and its members have been described as terrorists in some circles in Japan, and that debate over the issue has contributed to conflict in Japan–South Korea relations.

== Personal life ==
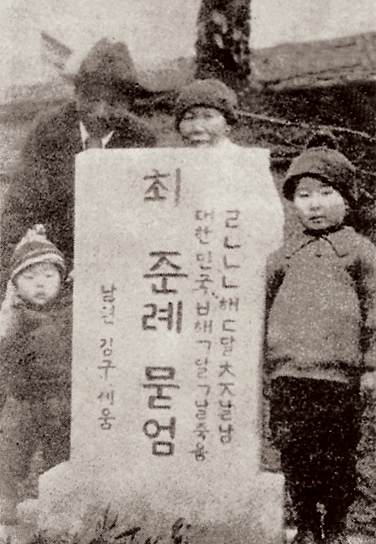
The gravestone of Kim's wife Ch'oe Chun-rye. Clockwise from top left is Kim Ku (aged 49), Kim's mother Kwak Nagwŏn (66), his elder son In (5), and his youngest son Shin (2) (1924)

Kim was married to Ch'oe Chun-rye (최준례; 崔遵禮; March 19, 1889 – January 1, 1924) until she died in Shanghai at age 34. She was first seriously injured due to a fall, then died from pneumonia. She was then buried in the Shanghai French Concession.

=== Children ===
Kim had five children in total, three daughters and two sons, but only his sons survived past childhood. His first daughter Mi-sang (김미상) lived from 1906 to 1907. His second daughter Hwa-kyŏng (김화경; 金化慶) lived from 1910 to 1915. His third daughter Ŭn-kyŏng (김은경; 金恩慶) from 1916 to 1917.

Kim In (1917–1945) joined his father in exile in Shanghai at age 3, in 1920. He went back to Korea in 1927 and returned to China in 1934. Afterwards, he served various minor roles in the Provisional Government's army. In 1940, he married Susanna Ahn, the niece of An Jung-geun. They had one daughter Kim Hyo-ja (김효자; 金孝子) in 1945, who was still living as of 2022. He died at age 27 in 1945 of tuberculosis in Chengdu, Republic of China.

Kim Shin (1922–2016) served as the Chief of Staff of the Korean Air Force and a number of other roles in politics. After his retirement from public office, he managed the family's various foundations. He died aged 93.

=== Family tree ===
Family of Kim Ku

Kim Sunyŏng 김순영; 金淳永; 1852–1901	Kwak Nagwŏn 곽낙원; 郭樂園; 1859–1939
Ch'oe Chunrye 최준례; 崔遵禮; 1889–1924	Kim Ku 김구; 金九; 1876–1949	Zhu Aibao 朱愛寶; 주애보 ?–?
Kim Misang 김미상; 1906–1907	Kim Hwagyŏng 김화경; 金化慶; 1910–1915	Kim Ŭngyŏng 김은경; 金恩慶; 1916–1917	Kim In 김인; 金仁; 1917–1945	An Misaeng 안미생; 安美生; 1914–2007	Kim Shin 김신; 金信; 1922–2016	Im Yunyŏn 임윤연; 林胤嬿; 1929–1971
Kim Hyo-ja 김효자; 金孝子; 1941–	Kim Jin 김진; 金振; 1949–	Kim Yang 김양; 金揚; 1953–	Kim Hwi 김휘; 金揮; 1955–	Kim Mi 김미; 金美	Kim Yun 김윤

Notes
- Dashed lines represent marriages
  - Dotted line for Kim Ku's de facto marriage
- Solid lines represent descendants
- Yellow for Kim Ku, pink for female, light blue for male

== In popular culture ==
=== Films ===
- Portrayed by Jeong Min in the 1969 film Temporary Government in Shanghai.
- Portrayed by Park Am in the 1973 film 20 Years After Independence and Paekpom Kim Ku.
- Portrayed by Cui Chengxun (崔成勋) in the 2012 Chinese film Great Rescue (《非常营救》).
- Portrayed by Kim Hong-pa in the 2015 film Assassination.
- Portrayed by Cho Jin-woong in the 2017 film Man of Will.

=== Television ===
- Portrayed by Lee Young-hoo in the 1981–1982 MBC TV series 1st Republic.
- Portrayed by Lee Young-hoo in the 2002 SBS TV series Rustic Period.
- Young version of Kim portrayed by Kim Sang-joong, and older version portrayed by Jo Sang-geon in the 1995 KBS1 TV series Kim Gu.
- Portrayed by Lee Young-hoo in the 2006 KBS1 TV series Seoul 1945.
- Portrayed by Lee Young-hoo in the 2010 KBS1 TV series Freedom Fighter, Lee Hoe-young.

== Bibliography ==
- Diary of Kim Ku (백범일지; 白凡逸志)
- Dowaesilgi (도왜실기; 屠倭實記)

== Notes ==
Political offices
Preceded by Hong Chin	President of Provisional Government of the Republic of Korea; 1926–1927	Succeeded by Yi Tongnyŏng
Preceded by Roh Baek-lin	Vice Presidents of Provisional Government of the Republic of Korea; 1930–1933	Succeeded by Yang Kit'ak
Preceded by Yi Tongnyŏng	President of Provisional Government of the Republic of Korea; 1940–1948	Provisional Government dissolved
