= Kim Ku hideout (Meiwan Street) =

Historic home in Jiaxing, China

Kim Ku hideout 金九避难处 김구 피난처
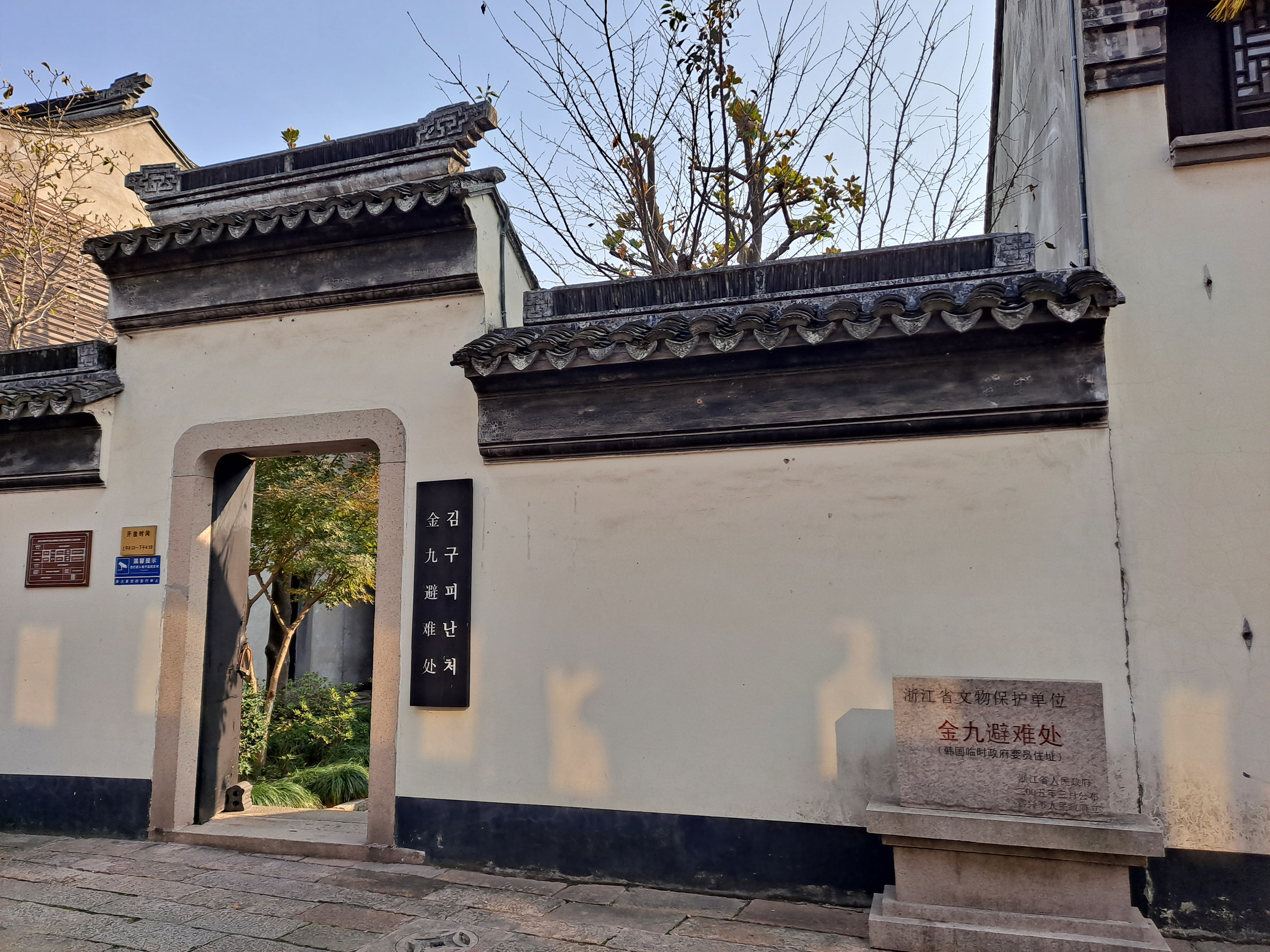
- Front entrance (2021)

General information
- Town or city: Jiaxing
- Country: China
- Coordinates: 30.7533°N 120.7463°E

A historic home that was once used as a hideout for Korean independence activist Kim Ku (1876–1949) is located on Meiwan Street, in Jiaxing, China. Kim and several others stayed here from May 1932 to around 1934. It is currently a memorial and exhibit to Kim Ku, his organization the Provisional Government of the Republic of Korea, and the Korean independence movement. In 2005, it was designated a cultural site of Zhejiang Province and set for preservation. It opened as a public museum in 2006.

== Description ==
Kim Ku was a Korean independence activist and member of the Provisional Government of the Republic of Korea (Korean Provisional Government; KPG) during the 1910–1945 Japanese colonial period. After organizing the April 1932 Hongkou Park Incident, Japanese authorities began aggressively searching for Kim. Kim was made to flee Shanghai. He received help from Chinese sympathizer Chu Fucheng during his escape. Chu hid Kim at this house, which then belonged to Chu's son-in-law Chen Tongsheng (陈桐生). That home was built in the late Qing dynasty, has a floor area of 270 square metres (2,900 sq ft), and faces Southwest Lake (西南湖). Kim stayed on the second floor of the building. His room had a false floor that could be removed to reveal a passageway to a dock. Other Korean activists were hidden at a nearby house. Kim stayed here until around 1934.

In 2001, the city of Jiaxing built a museum to Kim Ku next to the home. The building was opened as a museum in 2006.

== Gallery ==
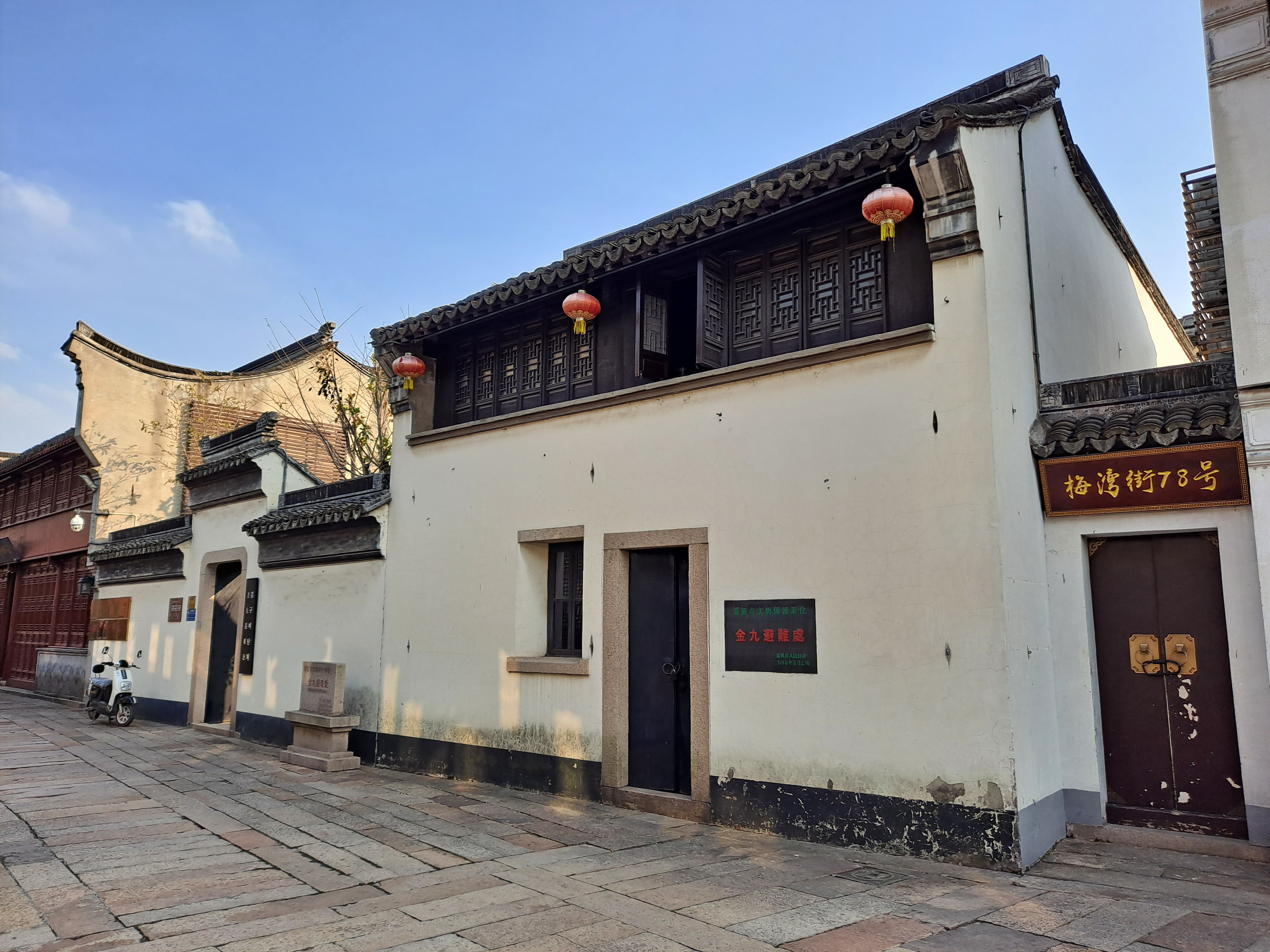
Nearby museum (2021)

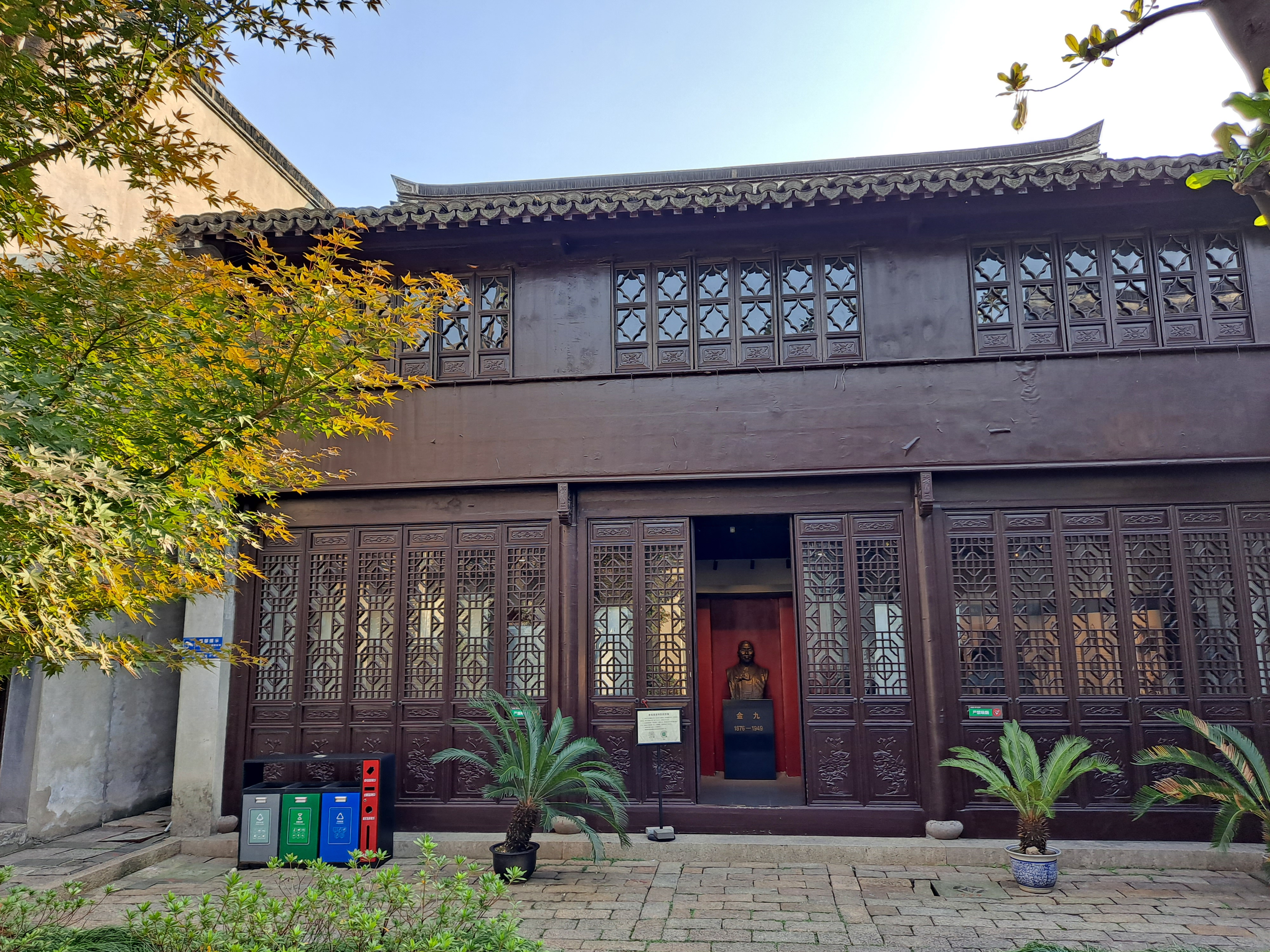
Home interior (2021)
