= Provisional Government of the Republic of Korea Memorial Hall, Chongqing =

Korean history museum in Chongqing, China

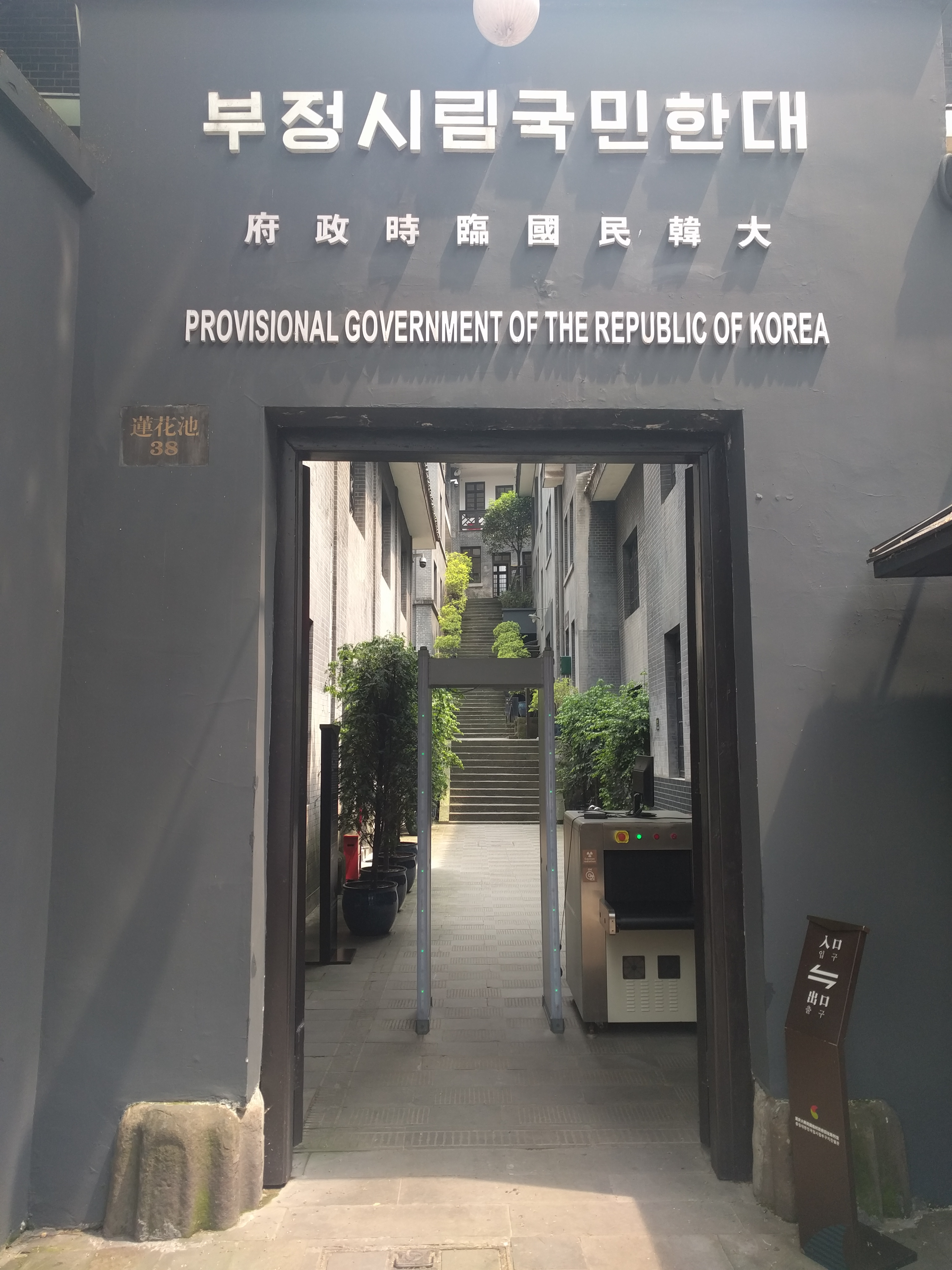
- Established: 1995 (as museum)
- Location: Chongqing, China
- Coordinates: 29.5585°N 106.5660°E
- Type: History museum

The Provisional Government of the Republic of Korea Memorial Hall (Korean: 충칭 대한민국 임시정부 청사; Chinese: 重庆大韩民国临时政府旧址) is a museum on the Provisional Government of the Republic of Korea in Chongqing, China. It was the final headquarters of that government in China from 1940 to 1945. It opened as a museum in 1995.

== History ==
The Provisional Government of the Republic of Korea (Korean Provisional Government; KPG) was a government-in-exile established by Koreans during the 1910–1945 Japanese colonial period. This building was the KPG's final headquarters in China; they stayed here from September 1940 until the surrender of Japan in August 1945. This was their third headquarters in Chongqing. While here, they established the Korean Liberation Army.

In June 1994, the Independence Hall of Korea and a local Chongqing organization signed an agreement to restore the building and create a museum. The museum opened in 1995. However, the humidity in the area resulted in damage over time. The building was renovated and its exhibits expanded. It reopened in 2000.

The total floor space is 1,770 m^{2} (19,100 sq ft). It is the largest memorial to the KPG in China. It consists of five grey brick buildings, with only some of the space open to visitors.

In 2017, South Korean president Moon Jae-in visited the museum.
