= Sejongno =

Street in Seoul, South Korea

- Sejong-daero looking northwards, fair on the pedestrian stretch

Korean name
- Hangul: 세종대로
- Hanja: 世宗大路
- RR: Sejong-daero
- MR: Sejong-daero

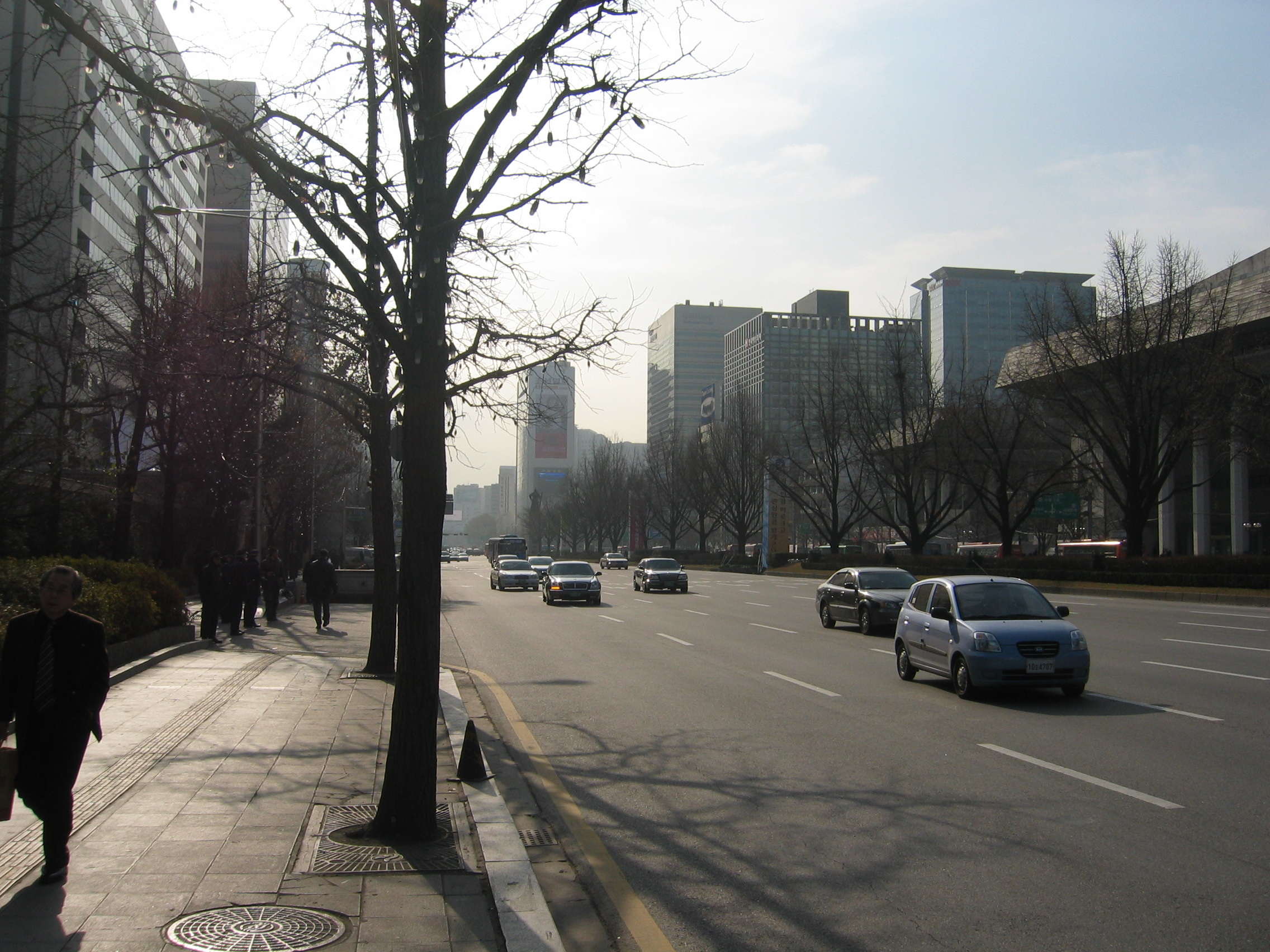
Sejong-daero; with the Ministry of Culture and Tourism on the left in 2006 with 16-lanes of traffic

Sejongno (Korean: 세종로), officially Sejong-daero (Korean: 세종대로) is a street that runs through Jongno District, downtown Seoul, South Korea. It is named after King Sejong the Great of Joseon. The street is 600 meters in length, but due to its central location it is of great symbolic importance. It points north to Bugaksan and Bukhansan (Mountains), and the Joseon-era palace Gyeongbokgung. It is also of historical significance as the location for royal administrative buildings and features statues of the Admiral Yi Sun-sin of Joseon Dynasty and King Sejong the Great of Joseon.

== Characteristic ==
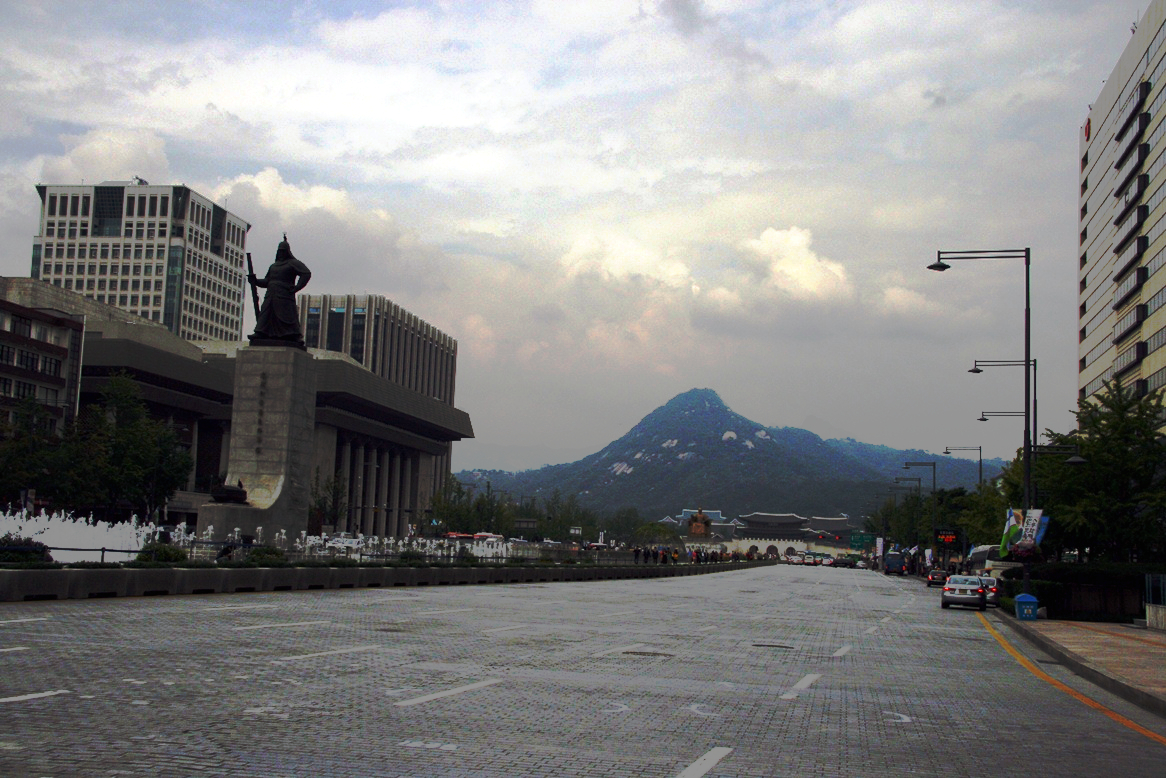
Sejong-daero in 2012, after the deduction from 16-lanes to 10-lanes of traffic, following the construction of Gwanghwamun Plaza with the statues of the Admiral Yi Sun-sin on the left

At the crossroads, stands the statue of the Admiral Yi Sun-sin, the naval war hero of Korea. At the northern end of Sejongno sits Gwanghwamun, the gate at the entrance to Gyeongbokgung. To either side of the street rests the Public Prosecutors Office, Sejong Center, U.S. Embassy, Kyobo Life, Kyobo Book Centre and The Dong-A Ilbo headquarters.

It was customary for the Korean Marines who are about to graduate their 2 years of service, to congregate in front of Yi's statue and swear allegiance. This was stopped due to creating immense traffic congestions to the 8 lane street of Sejongno.

In 2009, major sections underwent a renovation period of 15-months, which downsized the 600-meter road from 16-lane to 10-lanes of traffic. The project included sections of the road from the front of Gwanghwamun and stretches south from the three-way intersection, along the front of the Sejong Center for the Performing Arts to the Sejong-ro intersection, where the statue of the Admiral Yi Sun-sin stands. The reduction was to construct the Gwanghwamun Plaza, a public open space in the center to the road.

== Administration ==
On 29 November 2009, parts of road were closed to traffic for twelve hours to film lengthy gunfight scenes for Korean Broadcasting System (KBS)'s 2009 spy action television drama series Iris, starring Lee Byung-hun, Kim Tae-hee, Jung Joon-ho, Kim Seung-woo and Kim So-yeon. The five lanes along Gwanghwamun Plaza in front of the Sejong Center for the Performing Arts were closed to traffic from 07:00 to 19:00, while the five lanes on the Kyobo Book Centre side remains open to traffic. This marks the first time the Seoul Metropolitan Government has granted permission to blocked traffic along the Plaza for filming and it is part of Government's plans to promote the city's major tourist attractions; including Cheonggye Stream and Han River.

On 23 September 2012, the Seoul Metropolitan Government started on a trial basis, a 550-m designated section of Sejong-ro as pedestrian-only but permitted for cyclists. The section includes the road from the Gwanghwamun three-way intersection, along Gwanghwamun Plaza in front of the Sejong Center for the Performing Arts to the Sejong-ro intersection.

== Major building and visitor attractions ==
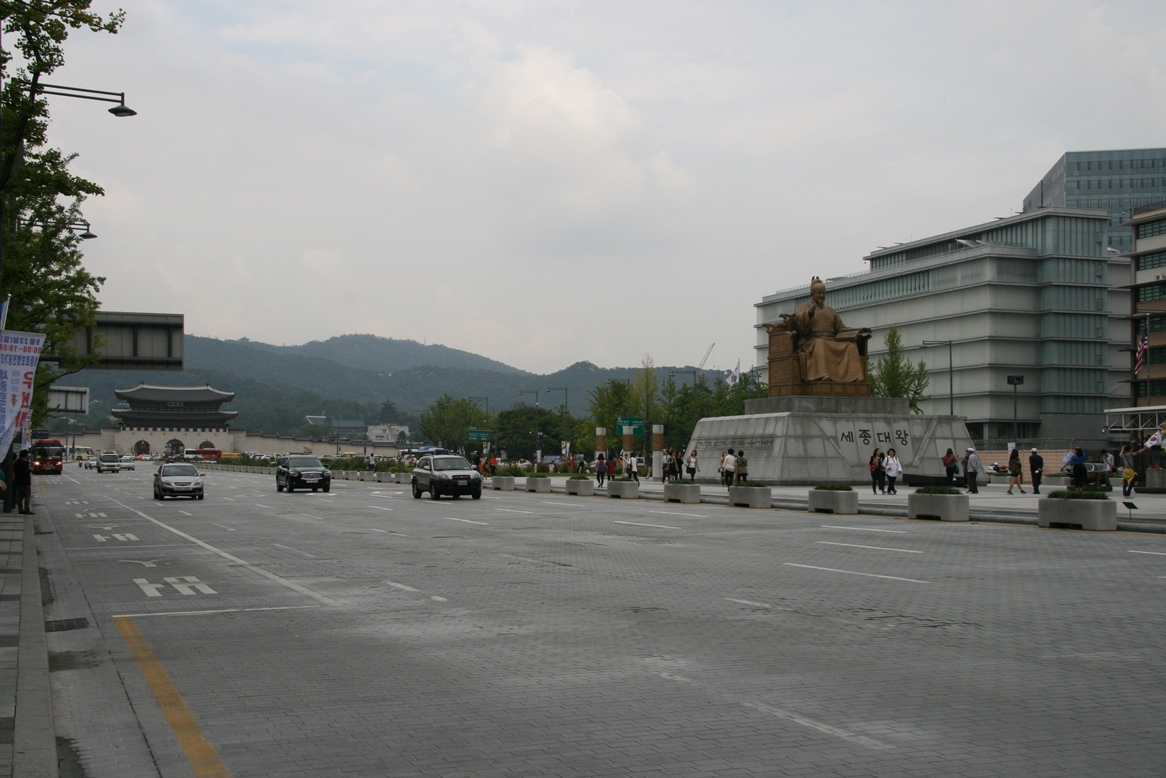
Sejong-daero in 2012, with the statues of the King Sejong the Great of Joseon on the right and Gwanghwamun on the left.

- Gyeongbokgung
- Gwanghwamun
- Central Government Complex
- Sejong Center for the Performing Arts
- Ministry of Culture, Sports and Tourism
- Embassy of the United States in Seoul
- Ministry of Information and Communication
- Korea Telecom
- Kyobo Life Insurance Building, Kyobo Book Centre
- National Palace Museum of Korea
- Ilmin Museum of Art
- The Chosun Ilbo
- The Dong-A Ilbo

== Transportation ==
Gwanghwamun Station, which is on Subway Line 5, is located at the southern end of Sejong-daero. Gyeongbokgung Station, which is served by Subway Line 3, has entrances near the northern end of Sejong-daero.

== See also ==
- Expressways in South Korea
- Transport in South Korea
