= Seodaemun station =

Train station in South Korea

Coordinates: 37°33′56.7″N 126°57′59.9″E

서대문 (강북삼성병원); Seodaemun (Kangbuk Samsung Hospital)
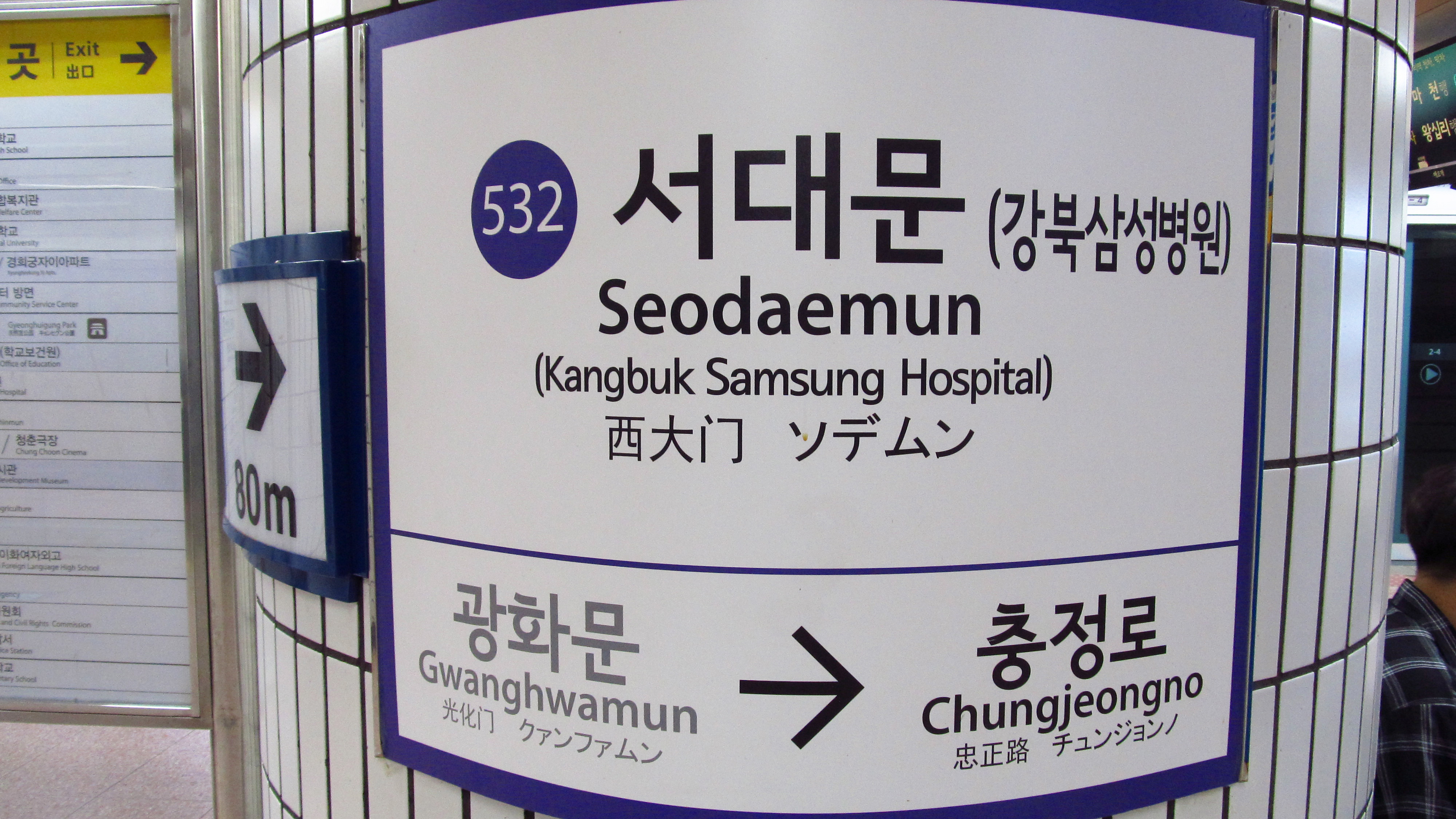
- Station Sign

Korean name
- Hangul: 서대문역
- Hanja: 西大門驛
- Revised Romanization: Seodaemun-yeok
- McCune–Reischauer: Sŏdaemun-yŏk

General information
- Location: 126 Tongillo Jiha, 90 Pyeong-dong, Jongno-gu, Seoul
- Operator: Seoul Metro
- Line: Line 5
- Platforms: 1
- Tracks: 2

Construction
- Structure type: Underground

History
- Opened: December 30, 1996

Services
Preceding station	Seoul Metropolitan Subway	Following station
Chungjeongno towards Banghwa	Line 5	Gwanghwamun towards Hanam Geomdansan or Macheon
Location

Seodaemun Station is a station on the Seoul Subway Line 5. It is named after one of the four great gates of the circular wall surrounding ancient Seoul.

== Station layout ==
G	Street level	Exit

L1; Concourse	Lobby	Customer Service, Shops, Vending machines, ATMs

L2; Platforms	Westbound	← Line 5 toward Banghwa (Chungjeongno)
L2; Platforms	Island platform, doors will open on the left
L2; Platforms	Eastbound	Line 5 toward Hanam Geomdansan or Macheon (Gwanghwamun)→
