= Pyeong-dong =

Pyeong-dong (Korean: 평동; Pyeong Neighbourhood) may refer to one of the dong of cities in South Korea:

- Pyeong-dong, Seoul, in Jongno District, Seoul
- Pyeong-dong, Incheon, in Gyeyang District, Incheon
- Pyeong-dong, Suwon, in Gwonseon District, Suwon, Gyeonggi-do
- Pyeong-dong, Gwangju, in Gwangsan District, Gwangju
- Pyeong-dong, Gyeongju, in Gyeongju, Gyeongsangbuk-do
- Pyeong-dong, Cheongju, in Heungdeok District, Cheongju, Chungcheongbuk-do
