= Gwanghwamun =

Palace gate in Seoul, South Korea

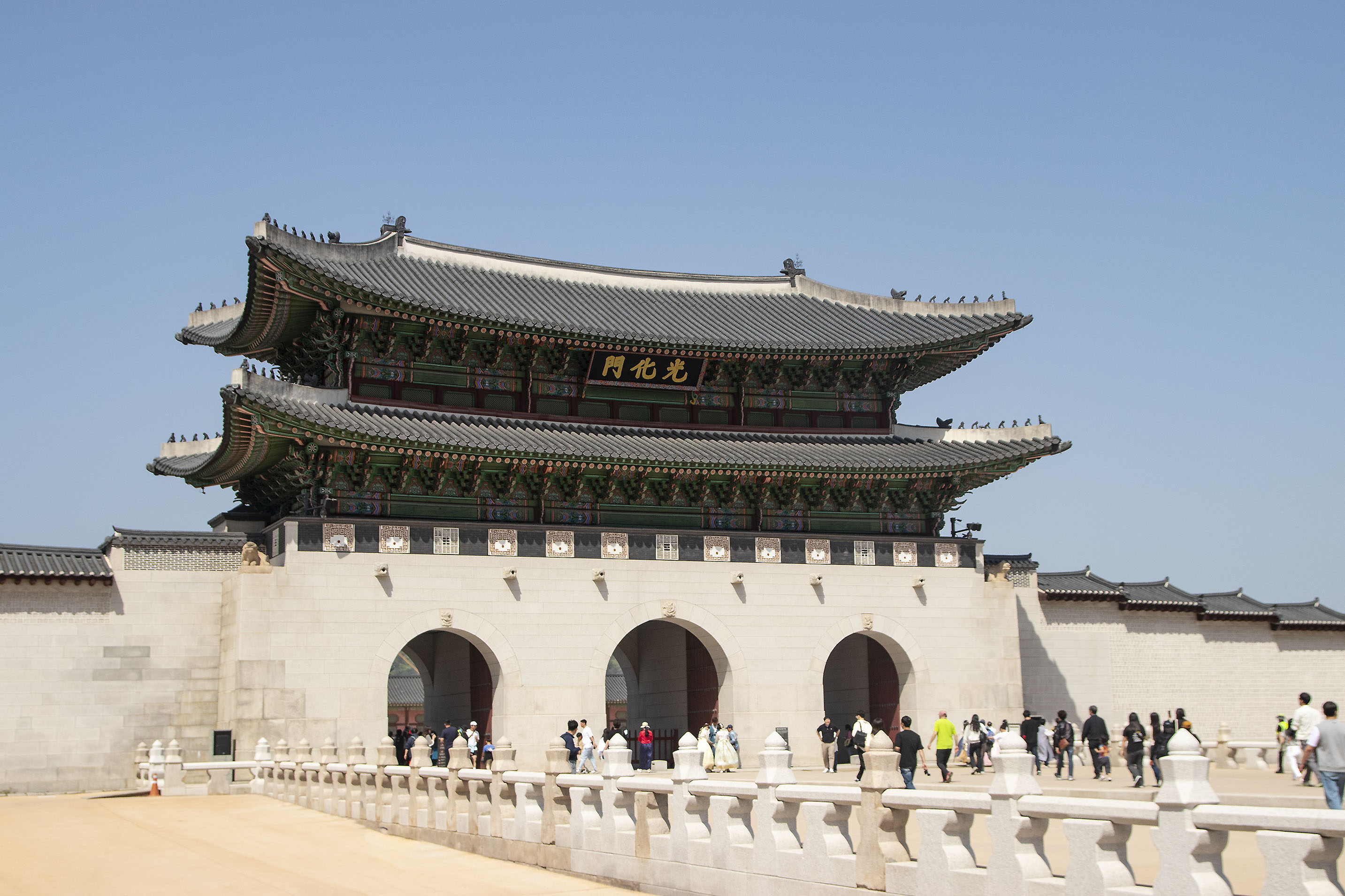
- Interactive map of the Gwanghwamun area
- Former names: Nammun, Omun

General information
- Location: Gyeongbokgung, Jongno District, Seoul, South Korea
- Coordinates: 37°34′33.76″N 126°58′37.27″E

Korean name
- Hangul: 광화문
- Hanja: 光化門
- RR: Gwanghwamun
- MR: Kwanghwamun

Gwanghwamun (Korean: 광화문; Hanja: 光化門) is the main and south gate of the palace Gyeongbokgung, in Jongno District, Seoul, South Korea. It is located at a three-way intersection at the northern end of Sejongno. As a landmark and symbol of Seoul's history as the capital of Joseon, the gate has gone through multiple periods of destruction and disrepair. The most recent large-scale restoration work on the gate was finished and it was opened to the public on August 15, 2010.

== Name ==
It was originally called Nammun (남문; 南門) or Omun (오문; 午門). It was given its current name by Sejong the Great in 1426. Its name has a number of theorized meanings, including "era of peace" (광천화일; 光天化日; kwangch'ŏnhwail) or "spreading the dignity and virtue of the country far and wide" (광피사표화급만방; 光被四表化及萬方; kwangp'isap'yohwagŭmmanbang).

== History ==
It was completed in the 9th month of 1395. It was renovated in 1432. It was destroyed in 1592, during the 1592–1598 Imjin War.

During Gojong's reign, the gate was recreated to be taller than the previous version. It was ordered that a large bell be installed in the gate on the 5th day, 9th month of 1870. A gate tower for it was demolished in October 1926. The gate was relocated in 1927 to the north of Geonchunmun; this effort began in April and was completed by mid-September.

During the 1950–1953 Korean War, its wooden portion completely burned down, leaving only stone. After the war and during the Park Chung Hee administration, it was reconstructed, controversially, almost entirely out of concrete and steel, save for its wooden nameplate featuring Hangul calligraphy from Park. Proponents argued that the modern materials used for the reconstruction symbolized Korea's modernization. It was completed in December 1968. It was rebuilt northwest from its original spot. It was later moved in front of the Government-General of Chōsen Building (after the liberation, the building was called "Central Government Building"; 중앙청; 中央廳; Jungangcheong; Chungangch'ŏng).

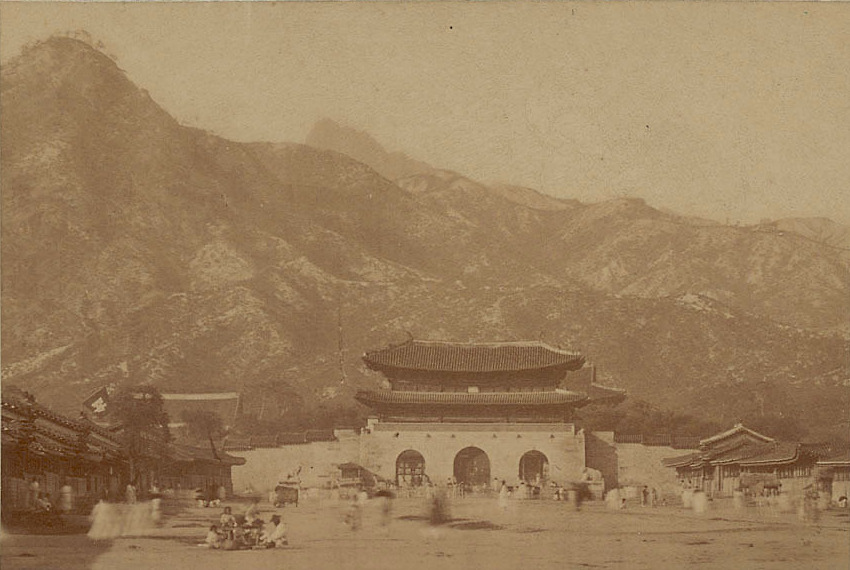
Gwanghwamun (1880s)

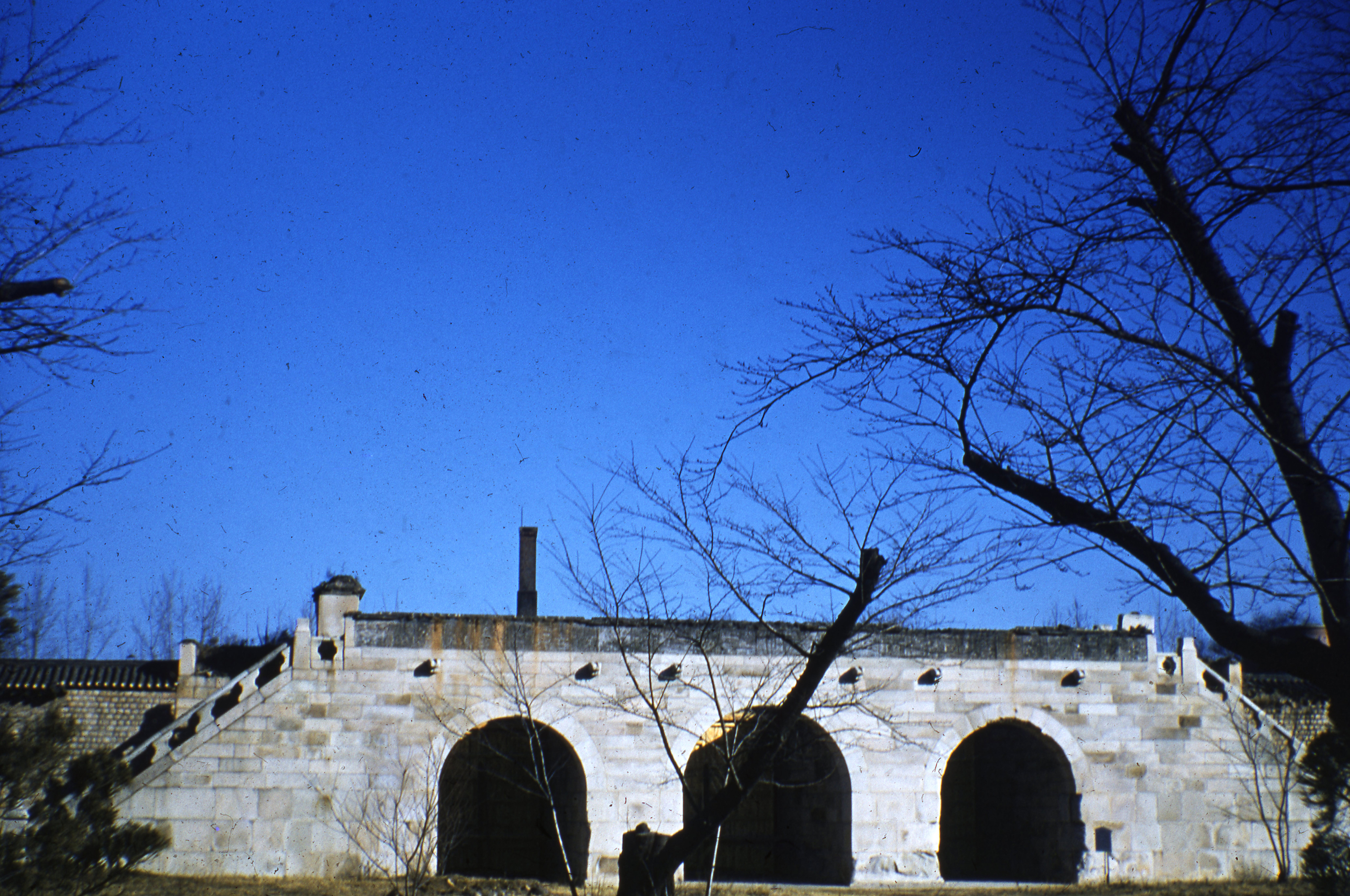
The gate with wooden portion completely destroyed during the Korean War (1952)

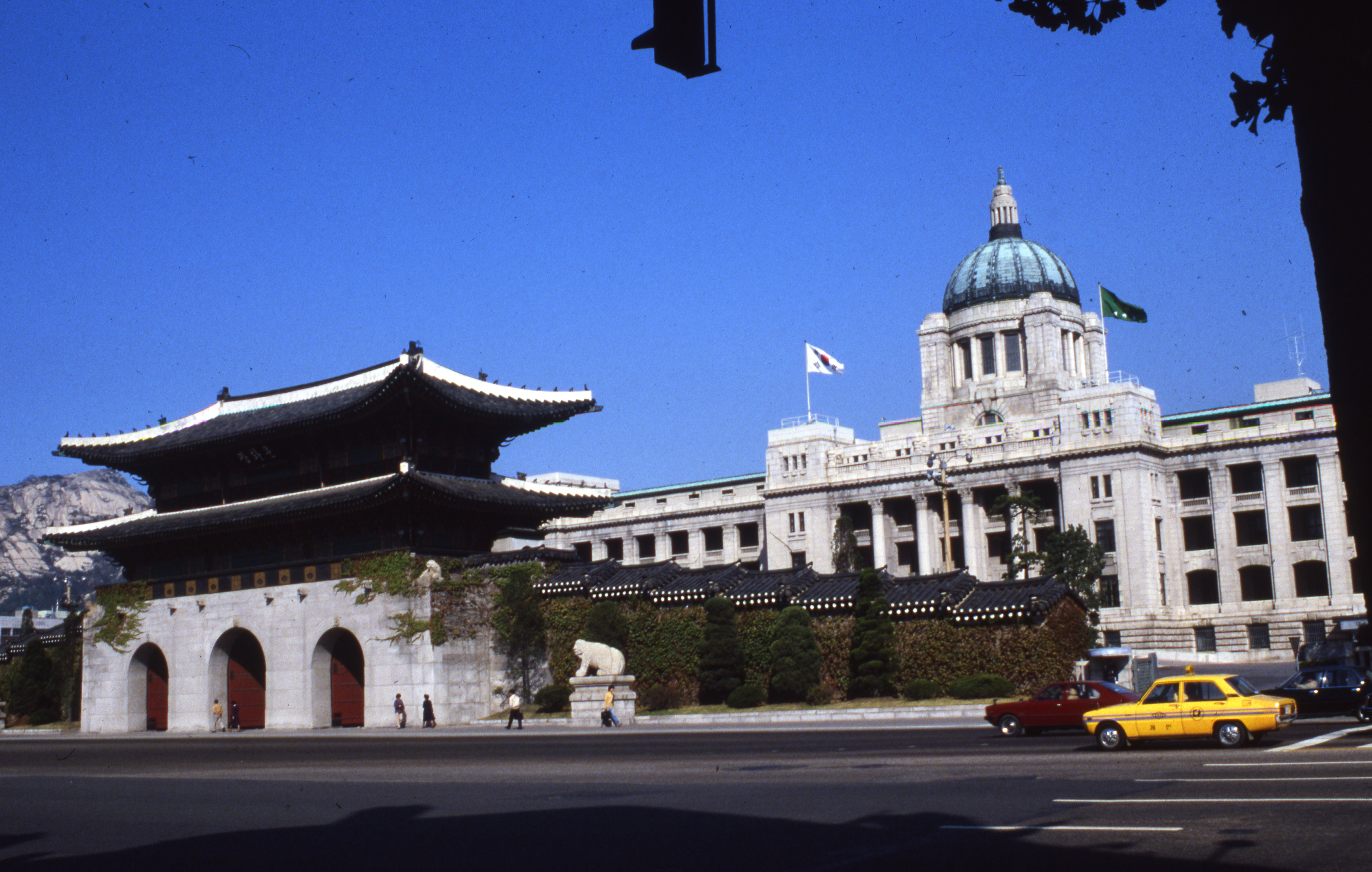
Gwanghwamun, with Central Government Building behind it (1980)

=== 2006–2010 restoration ===
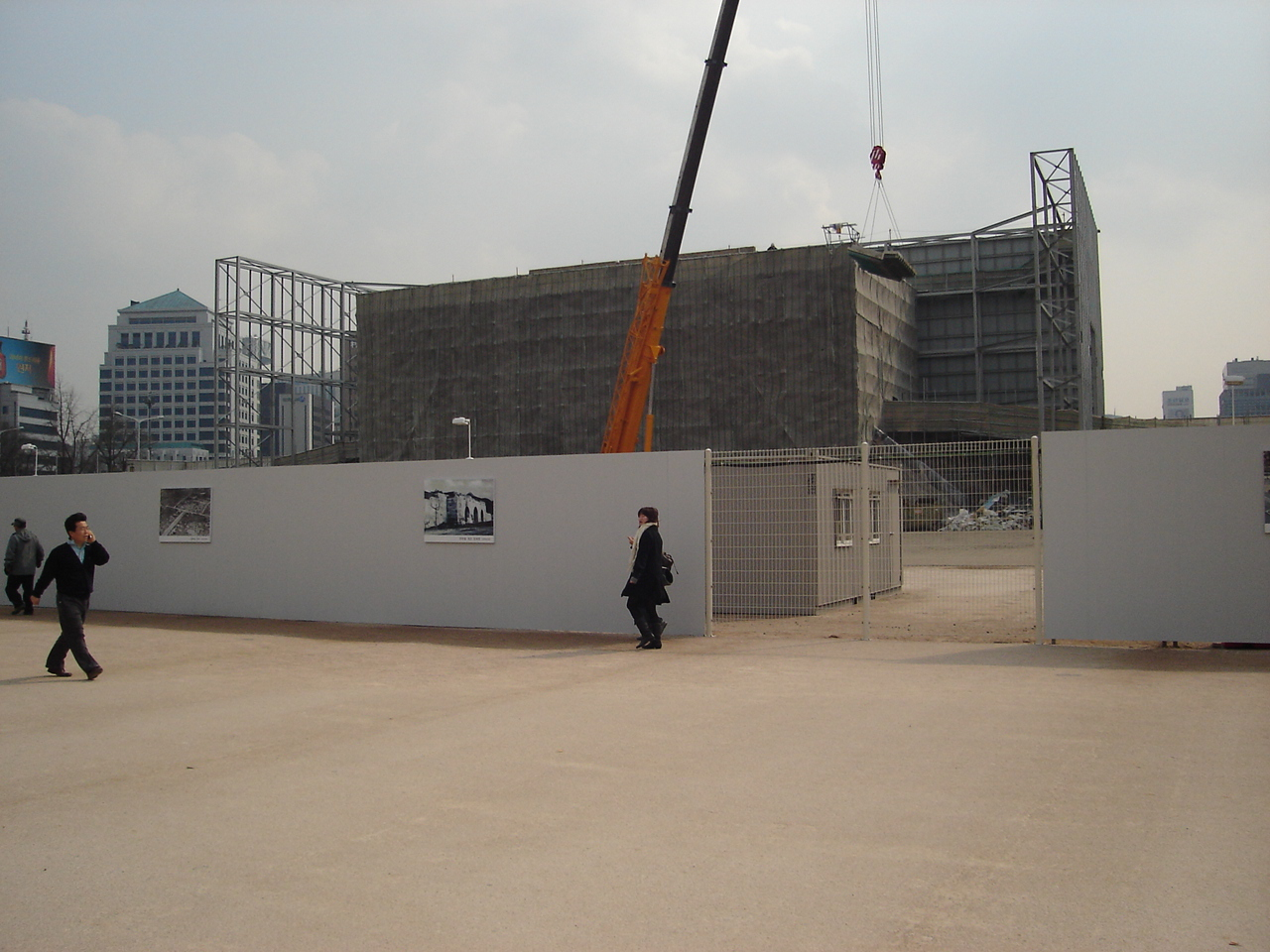
Gwanghwamun being restored (2007)

Gwanghwamun underwent a major restoration project starting in December 2006 and was finished in August 2010. The gate was disassembled and moved back to its original location 14.5 meters to the south, and its wooden structure was again reconstructed. It was rotated in order to accurately place the gate to its original location, which perfectly aligns it with the main north-south axis of Gyeongbokgung. The restoration was commenced by the South Korean government because an earlier restoration employed concrete instead of traditional materials and wrongly aligned the gate to the entrance of the CGB, then destroyed.

The aim of the largest renovation was to restore Gwanghwamun to its original wooden construction while paying meticulous attention to historical accuracy. The name plate of Gwanghwamun was recreated by analyzing its century-old glass plate photographs, while its wooden structure was devised from a blueprint created in 1925 by the Japanese Colonial Government. Pine wood used in the construction was painstakingly selected in Korea as the use of foreign imported wood for recreating Korea's historic buildings was strictly forbidden.

Gwanghwamun was opened to the public on August 15, 2010, to commemorate Gwangbokjeol, or Liberation Day of Korea. The project cost ₩ 28 billion. A new name plate on the restored Gwanghwamun was unveiled on the same day. The name on the plate was based on Hanja lettering by Im T'aeyŏng, the general in charge of the rebuilding program by Gojong, written against a white backdrop framed by Dancheong traditional coloring painted by master Yang Yong-ho. The lettering was done by master Oh Ok-jin, using the gakjajang method of calligraphic engraving, a technique designated as Important Intangible Cultural Property no 106.

However, cracks in the wooden plate were showing by early November, where a long vertical crack is visible on the left side of Hanja character "光" and beneath "門" in the middle. The Cultural Heritage Administration (CHA) blamed the dry autumn weather for the contraction of the wood, but experts differs on that an immature pine board was used to meet the deadline for completion and that the wood had not dried properly. After many debates, a repair to the cracks was made, and the panel at CHA concluded in December 2010 that it should be replaced, hence the Government commissioned a new name plate. 13 wooden boards for the new signboard were cut in September 2011 and have since undergone a natural drying process in Gangwon Province. However, in a survey of 5,000 people conducted by the Cultural Heritage Administration, 58.7 percent responded that the inscription should be in Hangul while 41.3 percent opted Hanja. The long-lost 1395 original was written in Hanja. A majority of experts consulted thought the sign should be carved as the original had been.

Gwanghwamun underwent a minor renovation project in 2023, with the name plate was reworked as black field and golden characters. While the Woldae (월대) in front the gate was restored as well.

== Description ==
Its ceiling is painted to depict pairs of fenghuang (mythological birds), longma (mythological dragon horses), and turtles. It has a statue of a xiezhi (haetae) in front of it; the legendary animal is believed to guard against fire and evil spirits.

== Tourism ==
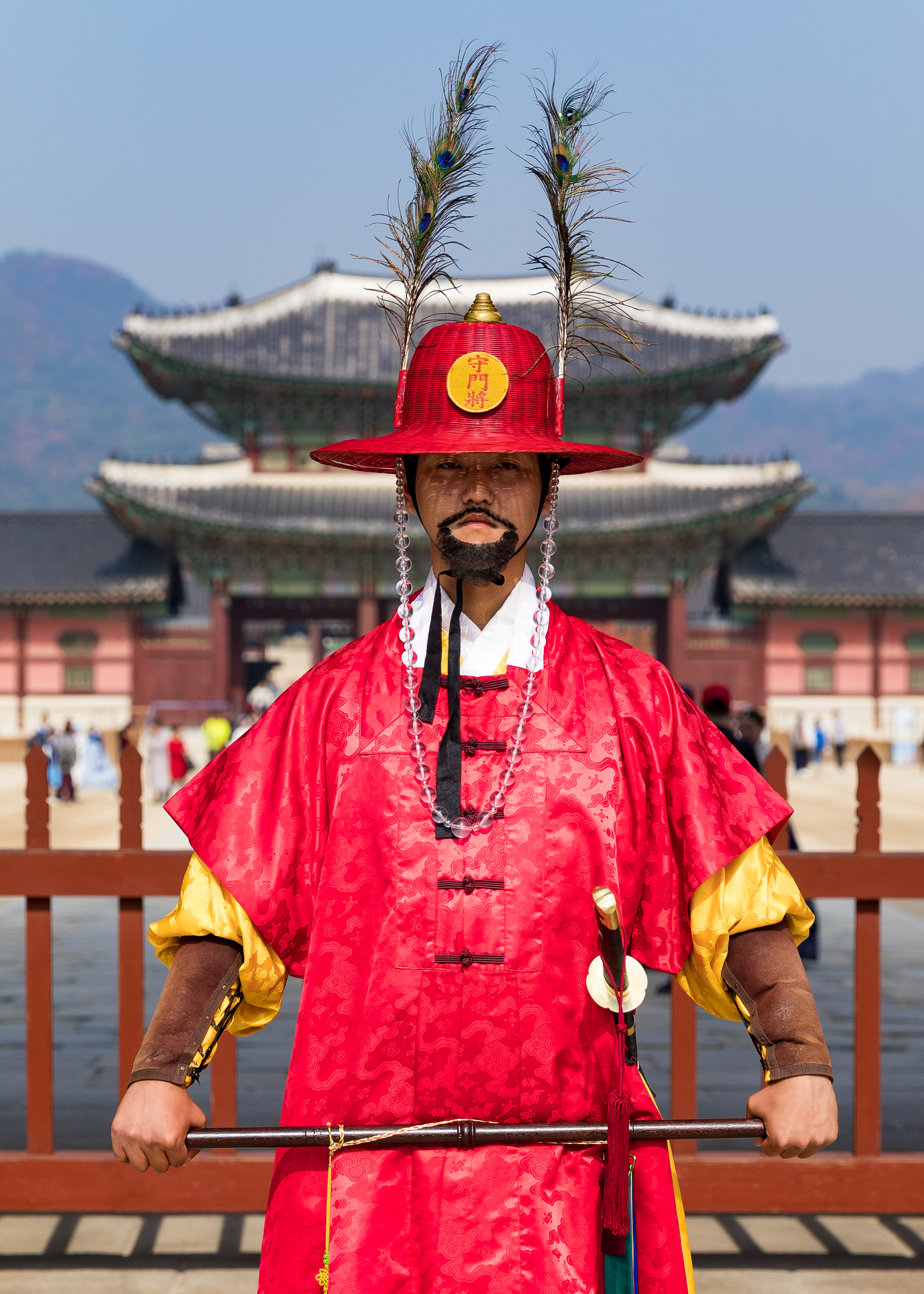
Gwanghwamun royal guard reenactor in 2018

The area in front of Gwanghwamun, known as the Gwanghwamun Plaza, was opened as a public open space on 1 August 2009. It is part of the Seoul Metropolitan Government's plans for environmentally friendly renovation projects such as the Cheonggye Stream and Seoul Plaza.

In a poll of nearly 2,000 foreign visitors conducted by the Seoul Metropolitan Government in November 2011, visitors stated that watching the changing of the guards at the main gate as their third favorite activity in Seoul. The royal changing of the guard ceremony is held in front of the main gate every hour from 10:00 to 15:00.

On 23 September 2012, the Seoul Metropolitan Government started on a trial basis, a 550-m designated section of Sejong-ro as pedestrian-only but permitted for cyclists. The section includes the road from the Gwanghwamun three-way intersection, along Gwanghwamun Plaza in front of the Sejong Center for the Performing Arts to the Sejong-ro intersection.

== Transport ==
- Gyeongbokgung Station on Seoul Subway Line 3 - nearest to the Gate
- Gwanghwamun Station on Seoul Subway Line 5 - located 600 metres at the southern end of Gwanghwamun Plaza
- City Hall Station on Seoul Subway Line 1 and Seoul Subway Line 2 - located 800 meters at the southern end of Gwanghwamun Plaza

== See also ==
- Gwanghwamun Plaza
- Statue of King Sejong
- Chŏng Tojŏn
- Gyeongbokgung
- Cheonggyecheon
- Bugaksan
