= Kyobo Book Centre =

South Korean book retailer

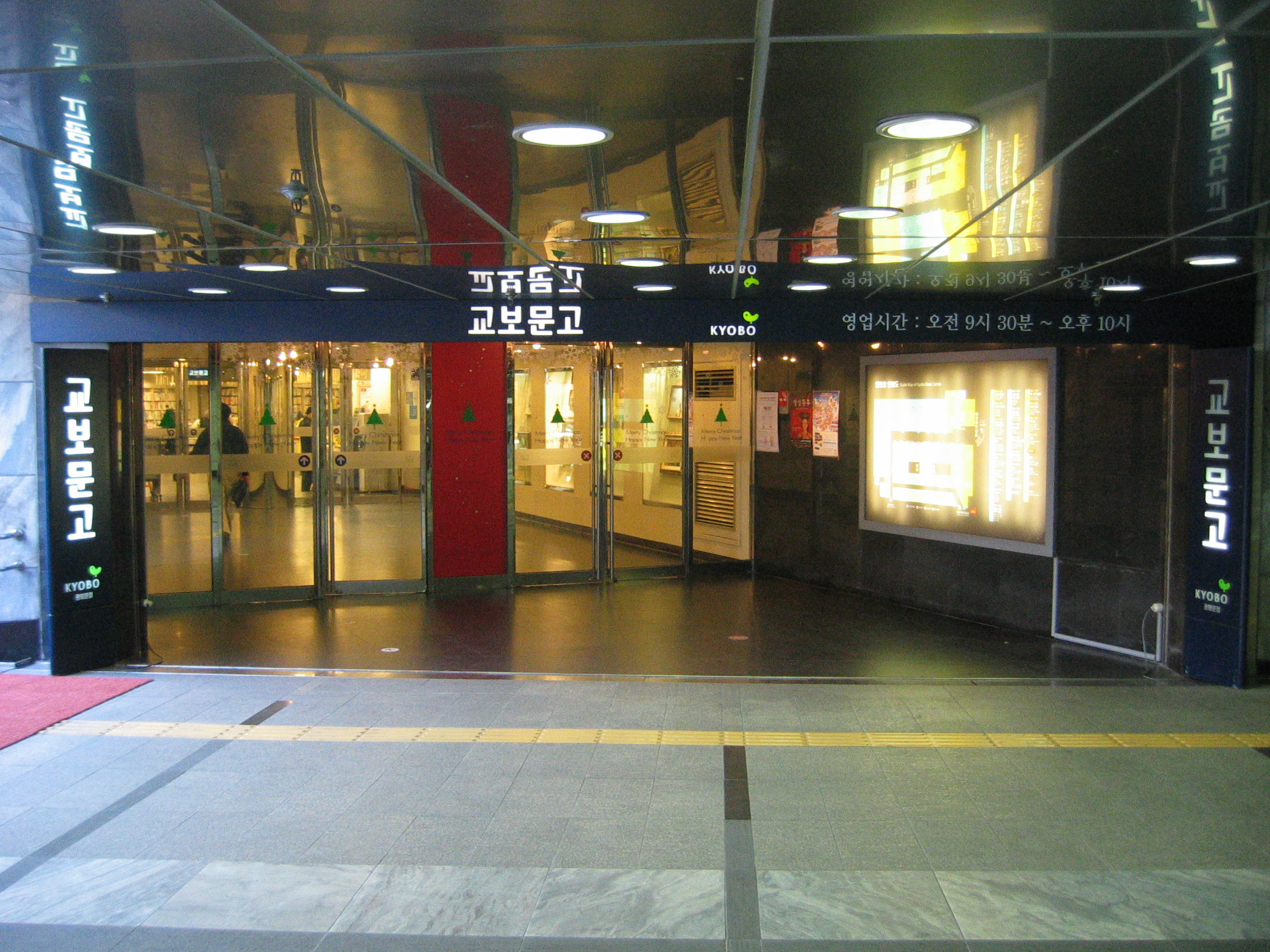
- Entrance of Kyobo Book Centre, Gwanghwamun Branch in 2006

Korean name
- Hangul: 교보문고
- Hanja: 敎保文庫
- RR: Gyobo mungo
- MR: Kyobo mun'go

Kyobo Book Centre (Korean: 교보문고) is the largest bookstore chain in South Korea. It has ten stores in seven cities, with the flagship Main Store, or Gwanghwamun-jeom in Seoul, which is located in the basement of the Kyobo Building, at 1 Jong-ro, Jongno-gu in Seoul's central business district.

== History ==
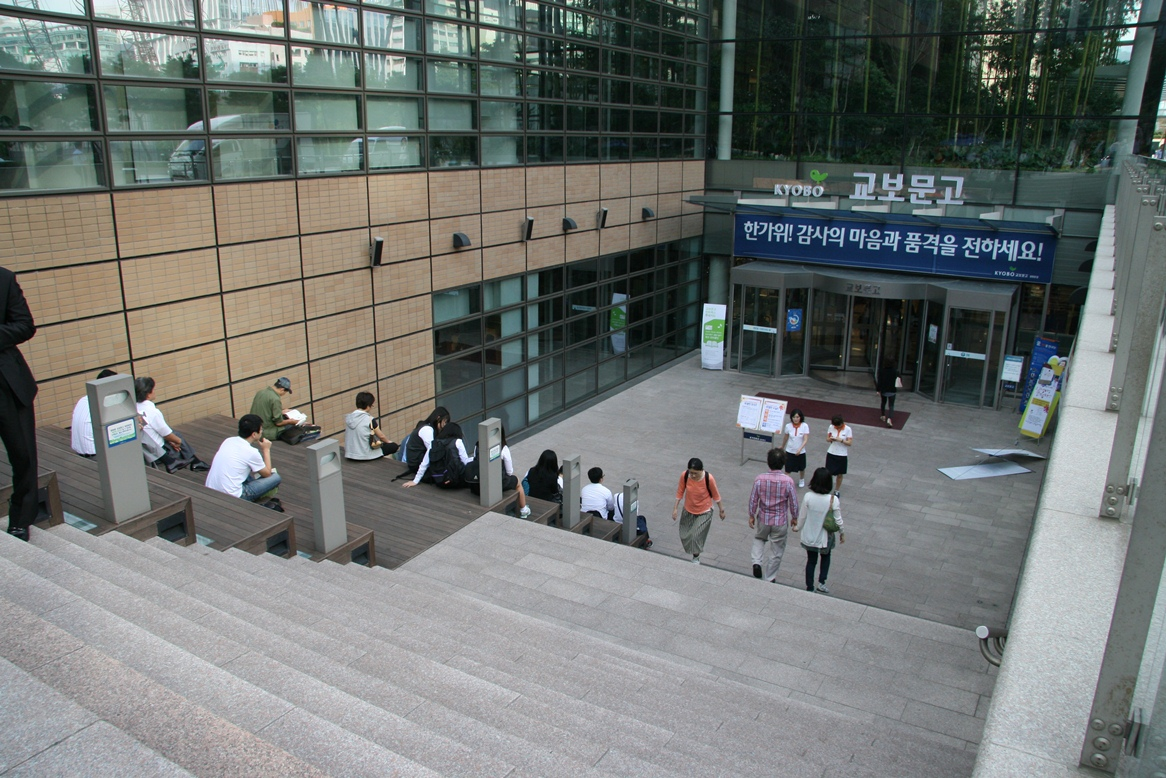
Kyobo Book Centre entrance at Gwanghwamun Plaza on Sejong-ro, Jongno-gu, Seoul, South Korea in 2012

Kyobo Book Centre was first established by its founding company, "Kyobo Moon-go Corporation", in December 1980. After six months, the first store opened in June 1981. It was built under the headquarters of its parent company, Kyobo.

The central location, with its address at 1 Jong-ro (Jongno 1-ga), enabled the site to receive much enthusiasm from readers, bringing much needed life into a depressed publishing industry. It underwent major renovations in 1991, to enlarge its property underground to approximately 9,000m². Its total length of leadways and passageways amounted up to 25 km. The Gwanghwamun Store is famous for its entrances, particularly the main entrance that one takes from Jongno 3-ga. Whereby before climbing the stairs to the heavy gate-doors, one can read in clear old-style Korean, across the outer wall of the passageway: "People create books, and books create people". When entering the passageway, one notices the famous Nobel laureates of the world, including Korean recipient of the Nobel Peace Prize, late former president Kim Dae-jung. An empty board exists for any future Korean Nobel laureate. It houses around 2.3 million volumes. Together with the enormous book store, it also has the "Hot Tracks" store, where a huge collection of music CDs and DVDs are sold. With this, there is also a huge stationery store, together with office ware and decorative products.

In May 2003, Kyobo Book Centre opened its eighth location (and third in Seoul) in Gangnam. It holds the record of being the biggest book store of the nation. Measuring 11,900m², it is located underground, below the Kyobo Towers in Gangnam. It has the "Book-master Dedicated Hotseats" and the automated book distribution system that was implemented the first in the world by any book store. From July 2009, it has connected with Seoul metro line 9, Sinnonhyeon station.

In August 2004, Kyobo Book Centre had around 3.2 million members in its Kyobo Book Club, and received around 180,000 visitors per day both at its online and offline stores. Kyobo has maintained its reputation as the "nation's book store" by frequently and regularly hosting various book-related events, and it is famous for its monthly "meet-the-author" events. Kyobo Book Centre has also maintained its number one position in the category of "Mega-size Book Stores" in the KCSI, or Korean Consumer Satisfaction Index, for a record eight years.

== Branches ==
- Gwanghwamun main branch, Jongno-gu: opened in 1981, in the basement of Kyobo Life Insurance Building. It was closed in April 2010 for large scale renovations. It was reopened on 27 August 2010 after a five-month refurbishment. It is accessible from exits 4 and 5 of Gwanghwamun Station on Seoul Subway Line 5.
- Gangnam-gu: A second book store of comparable size to the Gwanghwamun main branch. It is housed in the basement of the Kyobo Gangnam Tower. It is accessible from exits 6 and 7 of Sinnonhyeon Station on Seoul Subway Line 9.
- Yeongdeungpo-gu: opened in 2009 inside the Times Square complex
- Ulsan: opened in 2016, underground of UP square mall in Samsan-dong.

== In popular culture ==
The interior and exterior of the Gwanghwamun bookstore was used as a filming location for the 2007 MBC television drama Coffee Prince. Where the lead character of Choi Han-kyul buys books on coffee to nurture Go Eun-chan to be a barista, played by Gong Yoo and Yoon Eun-hye respectively.

== See also ==
- List of book stores
