= Gwanghwamun station =

Train station in Seoul, South Korea

Coordinates: 37°34′17.7″N 126°58′35.7″E

광화문 (세종문화회관); Gwanghwamun (Sejong Center for the Performing Arts)
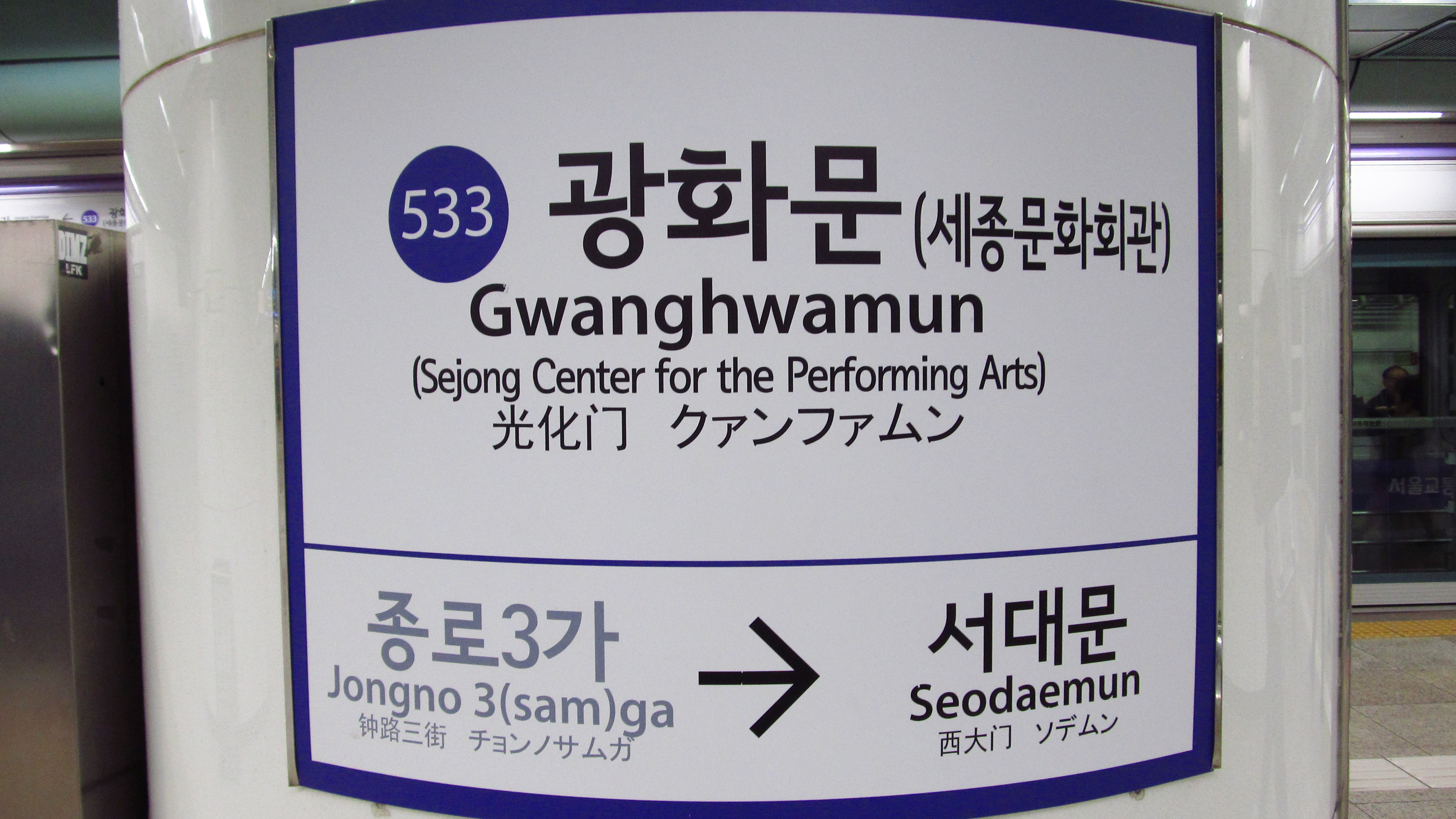
- Station Sign

Korean name
- Hangul: 광화문역
- Hanja: 光化門驛
- Revised Romanization: Gwanghwamun-yeok
- McCune–Reischauer: Kwanghwamun-yŏk

General information
- Location: Sejongdaero Jiha 172, Sejong-ro 1-68; Jongno-gu, Seoul
- Operator: Seoul Metro
- Line: Line 5
- Platforms: 1
- Tracks: 2

Construction
- Structure type: Underground

History
- Opened: December 30, 1996

Passengers
- 64,721 (2024)

Services
Preceding station	Seoul Metropolitan Subway	Following station
Seodaemun towards Banghwa	Line 5	Jongno 3(sam)-ga towards Hanam Geomdansan or Macheon
Location

Gwanghwamun Station (Korean: 광화문역) is a station on the Seoul Subway Line 5 in South Korea. It is located next to the U.S. Embassy and, despite being named for the Gwanghwamun gate, it is not the closest subway station to it.

This station has the highest traffic of all stations on Line 5.

== Station layout ==
G	Street level	Exit

L1; Concourse	Lobby	Customer Service, Shops, Vending machines, ATMs
L2; Platforms	Westbound	← Line 5 toward Banghwa (Seodaemun)
L2; Platforms	Island platform, doors open on the left
L2; Platforms	Eastbound	Line 5 toward Hanam Geomdansan or Macheon (Jongno 3(sam)-ga)→

== Vicinity ==
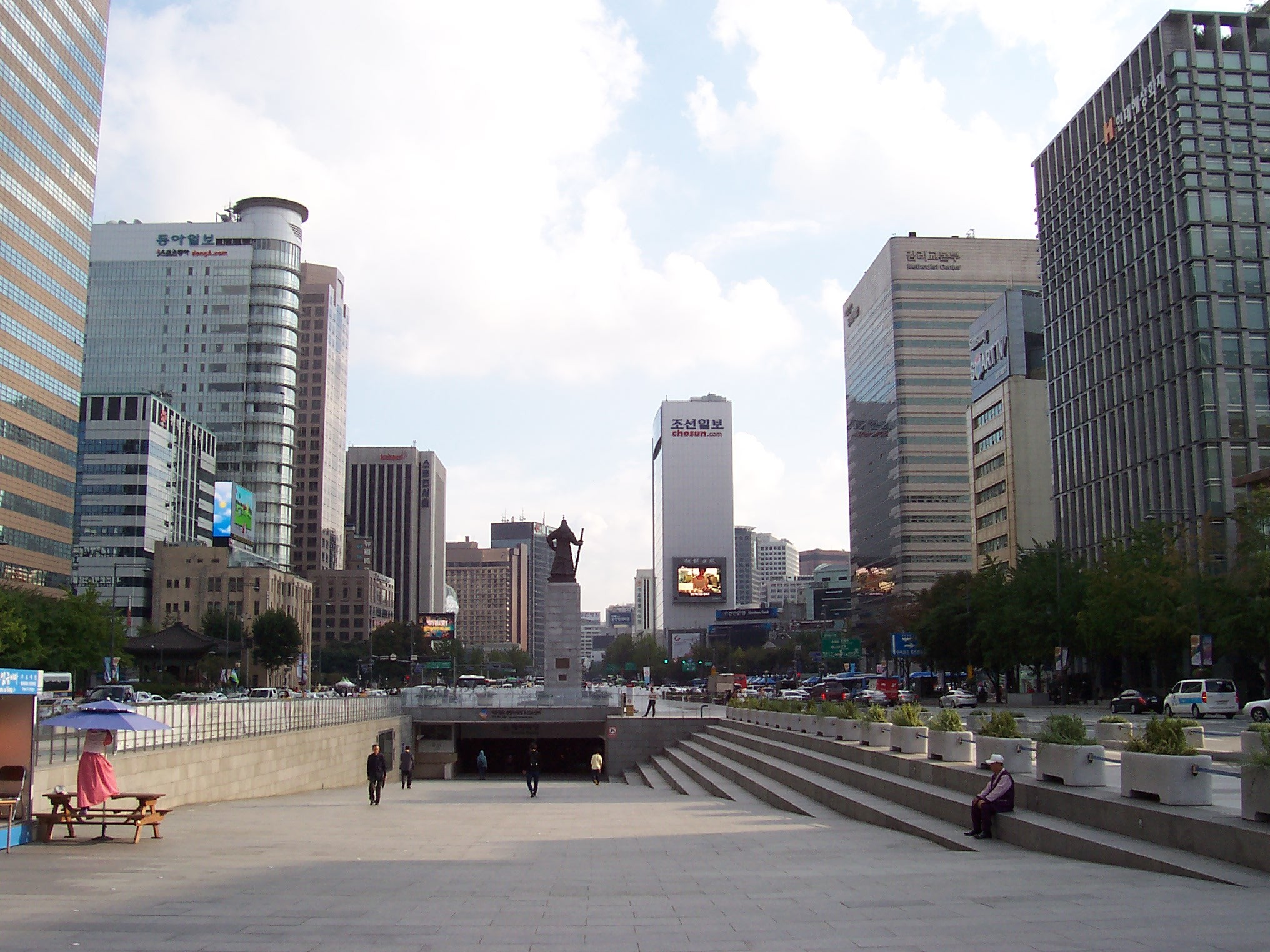
Entrance to Haechi Madang at exit 9 in Gwanghwamun Plaza

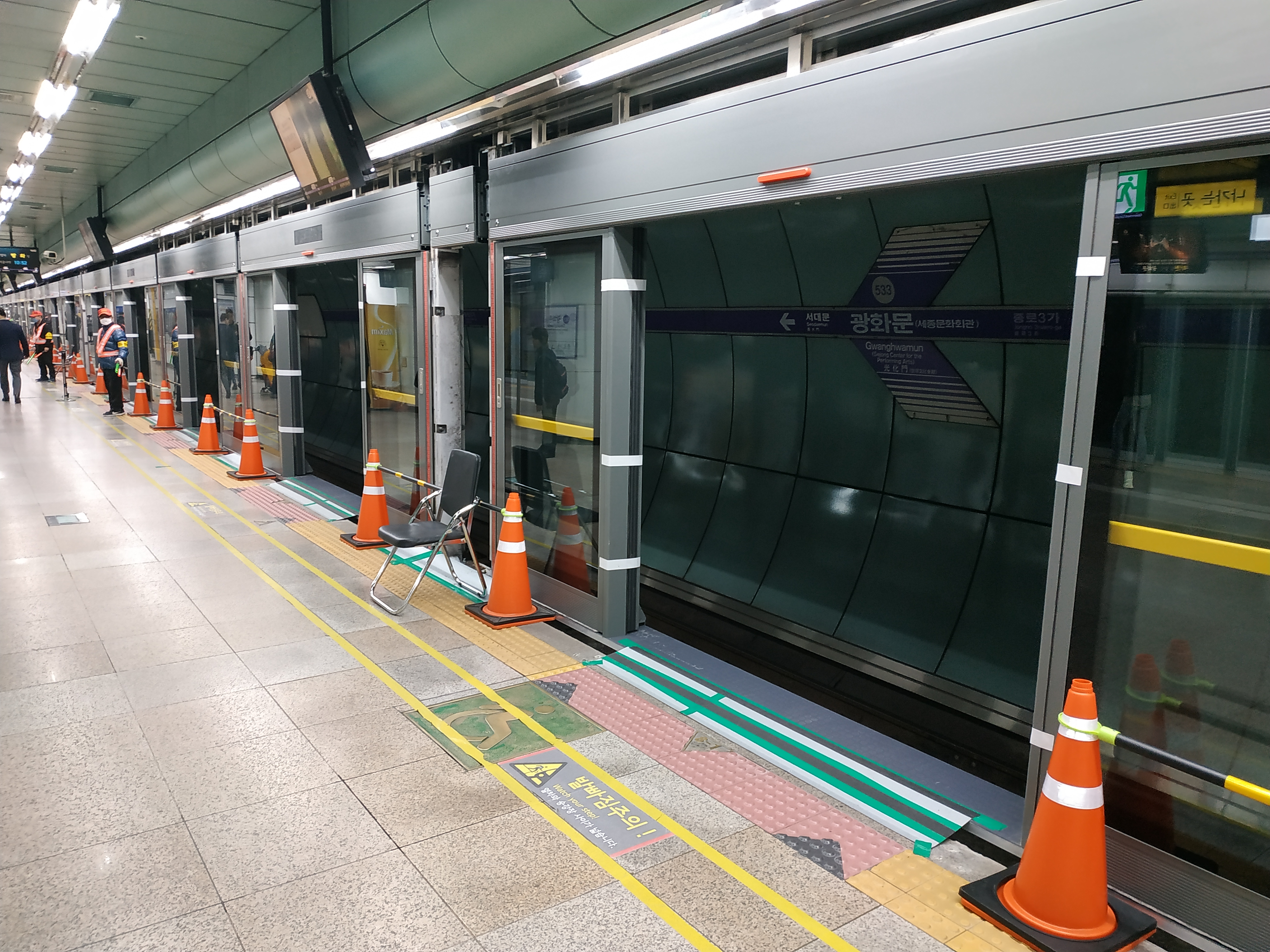
Safety screen doors being installed in one of the station platforms

- Exit 1: Sejong Center for the Performing Arts
- Exit 2: Embassy of the United States, Seoul, Ministry of Culture and Tourism, Jongno District Office
- Exit 3: New Zealand Embassy of Korea
- Exit 4: Kyobo Building, Kyobo Book Centre and Embassy of Colombia in Seoul
- Exit 5: Cheonggyecheon and Kyobo Book Centre
- Exit 6: Taiwan Embassy of Korea, Deoksu Elementary School
- Exit 9: Haechi Madang, an underground walkway that connects the station to Gwanghwamun Plaza

== Tourism ==
In January 2013, the Seoul Metropolitan Rapid Transit Corporation, which operates the line, distributed free guidebooks at the station. These guidebooks were printed in three languages: English, Japanese and Chinese (simplified and traditional), which feature eight tours as well as recommendations for accommodations, restaurants and shopping centers.

Nearby tourist attractions include: Gyeongbokgung Palace, Cheonggyecheon and Kyobo Book Centre.
