= Sejong Center =

Sejong Center for the Performing Arts 세종문화회관
- Established: April 14, 1978
- Location: 175 Sejongdaero, Jongno-gu; Seoul, 03172, South Korea
- Coordinates: 37.5725°N 126.9756°E
- Type: Art center
- Director: Kim Joo-song
- Architects: Um Duk-Moon, Pyung Goo Rhee
- Website: Official Website

Korean name
- Hangul: 세종문화회관
- Hanja: 世宗文化會館
- RR: Sejong munhwa hoegwan
- MR: Sejong munhwa hoegwan

Sejong Center for the Performing Arts (Korean: 세종문화회관) is the largest arts and cultural complex in Seoul, South Korea. It has an interior area of 53,202m². It is situated in the center of the capital, on Sejongno, a main road that cuts through the capital city of the Joseon Dynasty. The center took 4 years to complete, opening in 1978. It was "built as a cultural center for Seoulites". It currently contains one of the biggest pipe organs in Asia.

== History ==
After the Seoul National Hall was destroyed by fire in 1972, the construction of a venue to continue the cultural heritage of that structure was proposed. Construction began in 1974, and it completed on April 14, 1978. In 1999, the center was placed under control of a foundation.

The center's design was based on a fusion of Korean national symbols and the western architectural designs. The name "Sejong" is from the 4th ruling king of the Joseon Dynasty, Sejong the Great.

On 23 September 2012, the Seoul Metropolitan Government started on a trial basis, a 550-m designated section of Sejong-ro as pedestrian-only but permitted for cyclists. The section includes the road from the Gwanghwamun three-way intersection, along Gwanghwamun Plaza in front of the Sejong Center to the Sejong-ro intersection.

== Facilities ==
Sejong Center

=== Main Auditorium ===
The "Big" Theater as it is called in Korean, is a technologically advanced theater. It opened in 1999 to show Shim Hyung-rae's Yonggary and has a capacity for 3,000 people and is the biggest Theater at the country.

=== Minor Hall ===
Called The "Small" Theater in Korean, is constructed in an interesting style over 2 floors, and can seat 442 people, the stage can allow for 100 people on performance.

=== Arts Forum Galleries ===
- Main Gallery: The Arts Forum is a large room (1,056 m^{2}) that is divided into 4 separate rooms for viewings of different sizes and numbers.
- New Gallery: The New Gallery is a (594 m^{2}) place for artwork that excels in the social, popular and cultural side of Korean art.
- Gwang Hwa Moon Gallery: Originally part of the 5th Line Subway Metro System, it houses artworks that are considered to be outstanding by the youth and new up-and-coming artists. Considered to be an example of Subway Art Galleries.

=== Gwang Hwa Rang ===
The Gwang Hwa Rang is situated underneath the Sejong-ro crossroads, it opened on February 17, 2005, with complete free access to pedestrians and art-discerning Seoulites. It includes a window-gallery that enables by-passers on ground level to peek inside.

=== Sejong Convention Center and Hall ===
The Convention Center and Hall is usually used for big events and conferences. With a size of 627 m^{2}, it can house around 400 people. It includes 250 translating systems that interpret five different languages simultaneously. The convention hall has a smaller size convention center that is used for similar purposes and is able to accommodate 120 people.

=== Sam Chung Gak ===
Measuring in 19417 m^{2}, Sam Chung Gak is a collaboration of six traditional Korean Housings. Since 2001, it has been used by the center as a place for traditional heritage experience.

== Resident companies ==
- Seoul Philharmonic
- Seoul National Philharmonic
- Seoul Metropolitan Theater Company
- City of Seoul Musical Company
- Seoul Metropolitan Chorus
- Seoul National Traditional Dance Company
- Seoul Metropolitan Opera
- Seoul Youth Orchestra
- Seoul Youth Choir

== See also ==
- Contemporary culture of South Korea
- List of concert halls
- Sejong the Great of Joseon
- Statue of King Sejong (Gwanghwamun)

Preceded by Perth Entertainment Centre (Australia) Perth	Miss Universe venue 1980	Succeeded by Minskoff Theater (United States) New York City
