= Bugaksan =

Mountain in Seoul, South Korea

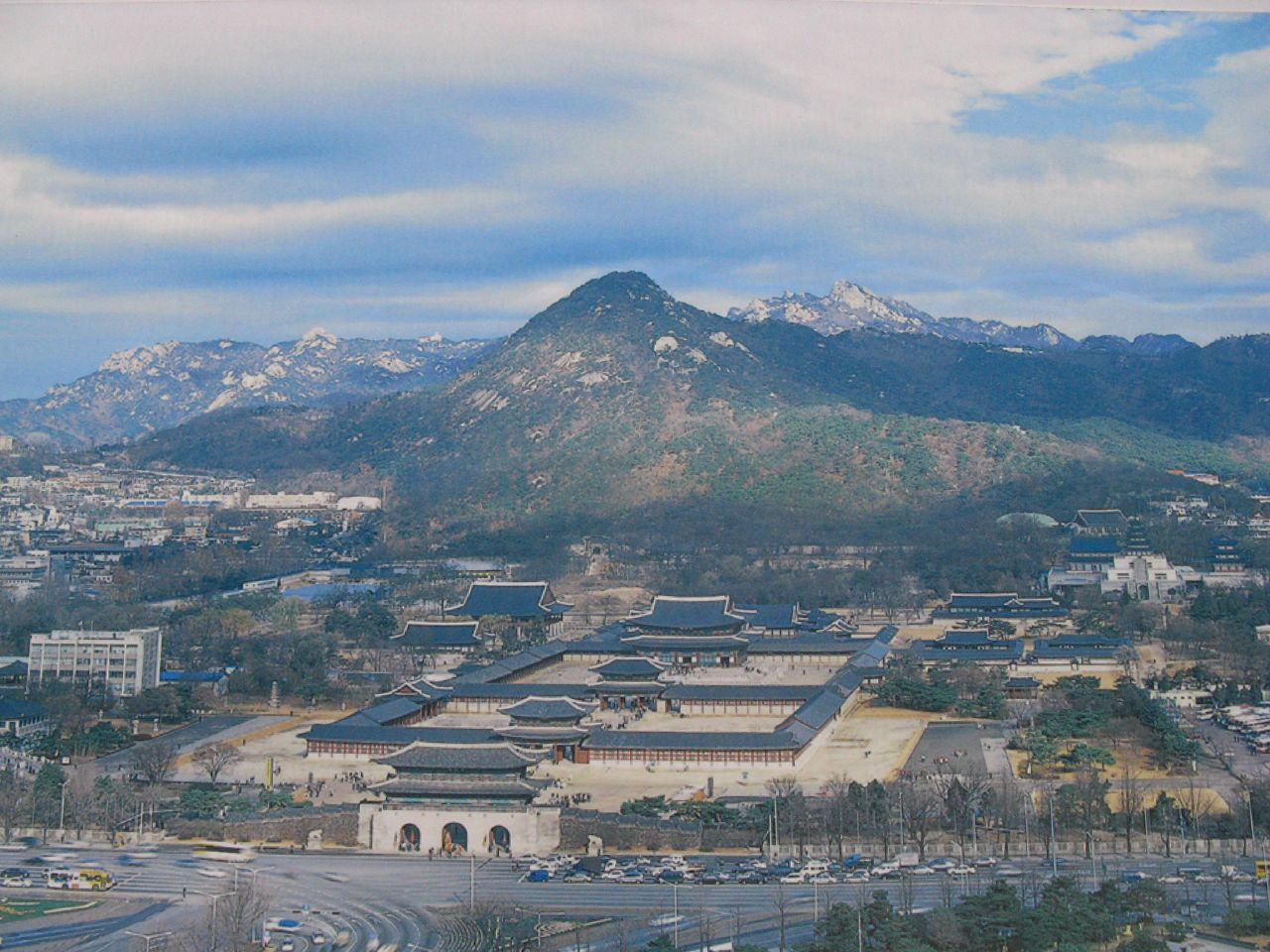
- Bugaksan overlooking the former royal palace Gyeongbokgung (2008)

Highest point
- Elevation: 342 m (1,122 ft)
- Coordinates: 37°36′22″N 126°59′00″E

Naming
- Etymology: North mountain

Geography
- Country: South Korea
- City: Seoul

Korean name
- Hangul: 북악산
- Hanja: 北岳山
- RR: Bugaksan
- MR: Pugaksan

Alternate name
- Hangul: 백악산
- Hanja: 白岳山
- RR: Baegaksan
- MR: Paegaksan

Bugaksan (Note: Sometimes spelled Bukaksan) (Korean: 북악산) is a mountain in the north of Seoul, South Korea. It famously overlooks the former royal palace Gyeongbokgung as well as the presidential residence, the Blue House. Bugaksan, along with Inwangsan, Naksan, and Namsan surround the Seoul Basin. The mountain has a bedrock of granite, and is about 342 meters (1,122 ft) high.

The mountain has historically gone by a number of other names, including Baegaksan (백악산).

== Names ==
Until the Joseon period, the mountain went by a variety of names, including "Baegaksan", "Myeonaksan" (면악산; 面岳山), and "Gonggeuksan" (공극산; 拱極山). However, "Baegaksan" was the most popular name during the Joseon period.

The name "Bugaksan", meaning "north mountain", became popular just after the Japanese colonial period. Some government offices have made efforts to return to using the "Baegaksan" name, in order to strengthen modern South Korea's ties to the pre-Japanese past.

== Description ==
The mountain is part of a range of mountains connected to the south of Bukhansan, the highest mountain in Seoul.

There are 208 species of plants on the mountain, including 81 species of trees.

The Cheonggyecheon stream that flows through Seoul originates from the mountain. In November 2005, the Jongno District government investigated the source of the river, and found that it was a mineral water spring about 150 metres (490 ft) from a statue of police officer Choi Gyu-sik.

The Bugak Skyway, located along the northeast ridge of Bugaksan Mountain, has gained a reputation as Korea's most scenic driving route since its opening in September 1968.

== History ==
Beginning in the Joseon period, the mountain was a popular spot for the aristocracy to construct villas.

After the Blue House Raid of January 21, 1968, in which North Korean operatives attempted to assassinate the South Korean president, access to the mountain became heavily restricted. These restrictions began to be lifted on April 1, 2006, when Sukjeongmun was reopened for public access. Beginning on November 1, 2020, a section north of the Blue House was opened to the public. It is now possible to hike from the mountain Ansan, Inwangsan, Bugaksan, and Bukhansan without interruption. There is a number of guided walking courses over the mountain, including one that walks along the Fortress Wall of Seoul.

The mountain was designated an area of secnic beauty in 2009 by the Cultural Heritage Administration.

== Gallery ==
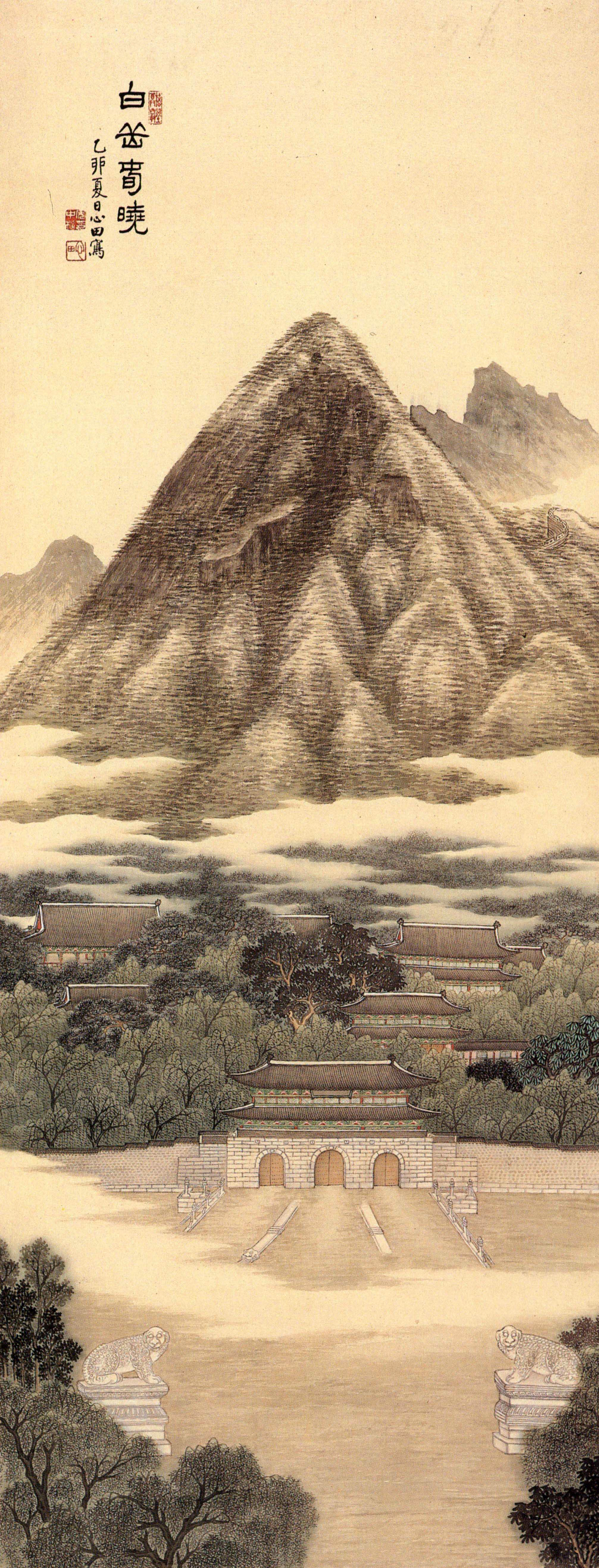
1915 painting of Bugaksan by An Jung-sik

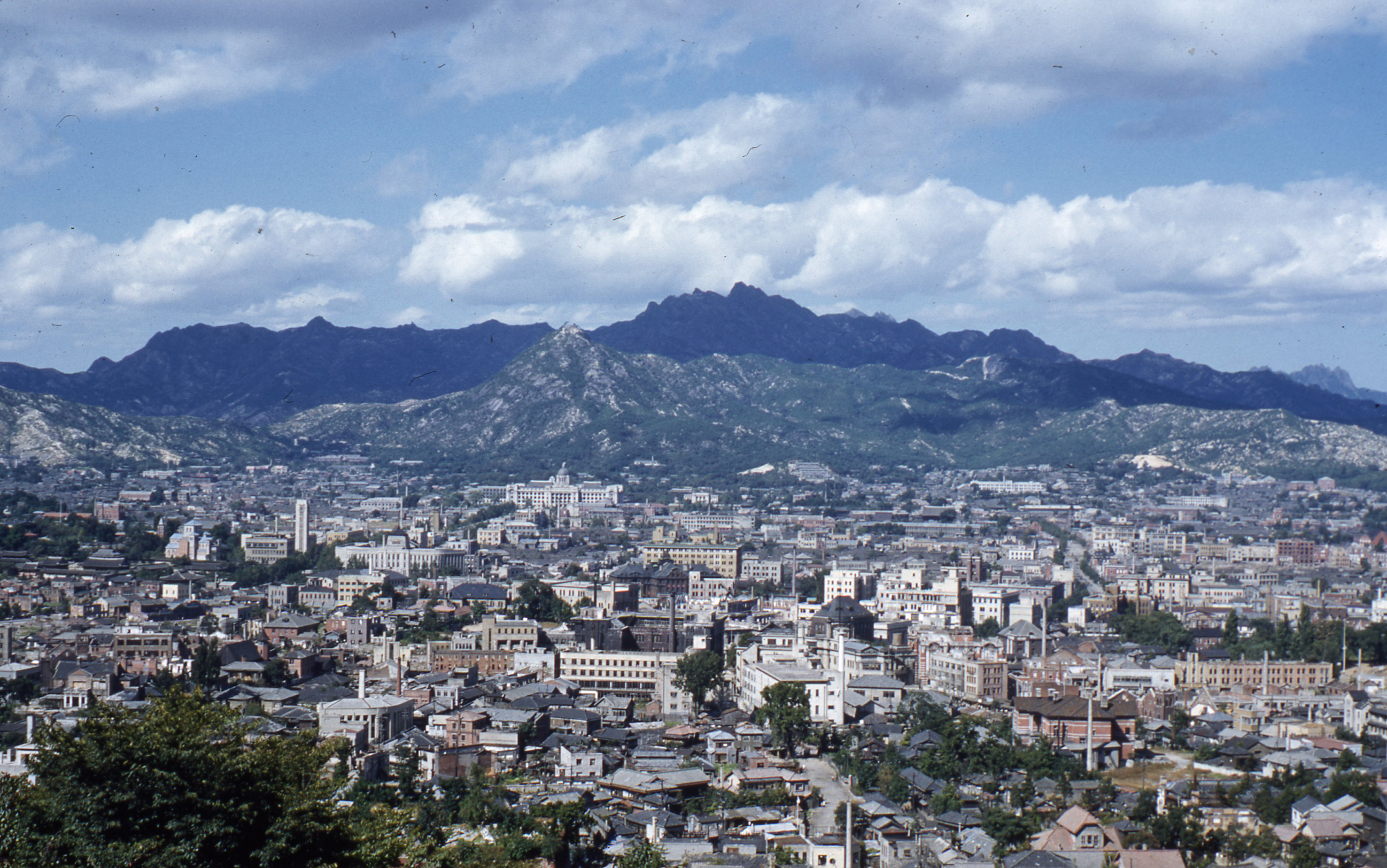
1953 view of the mountain, from Namsan. The Japanese General Government Building can be seen standing where Gyeongbokgung stood before

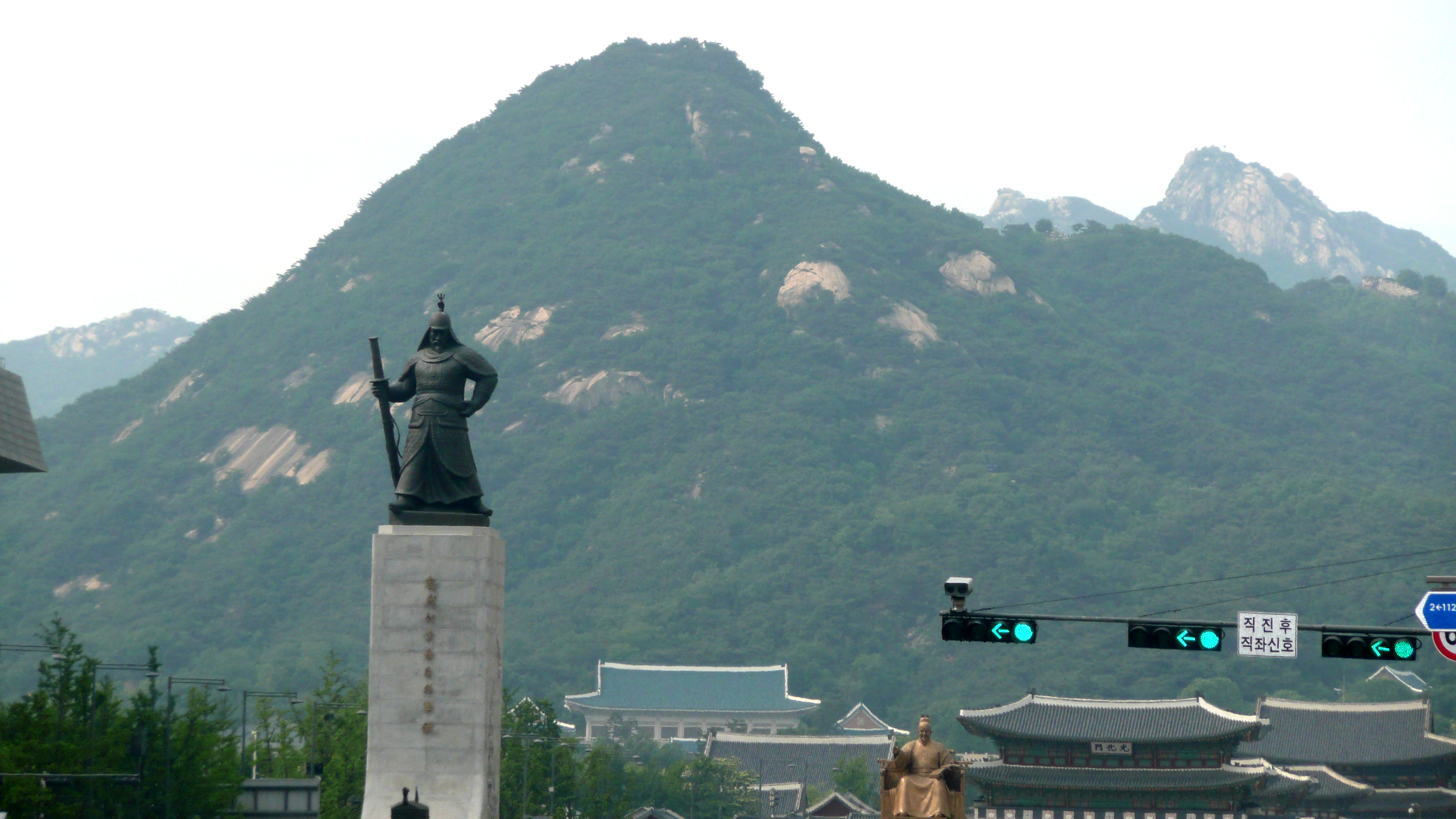
Statue of Admiral Yi Sun-sin and the mountain. The Blue House and the Statue of King Sejong can also be seen in the bottom. (2011)

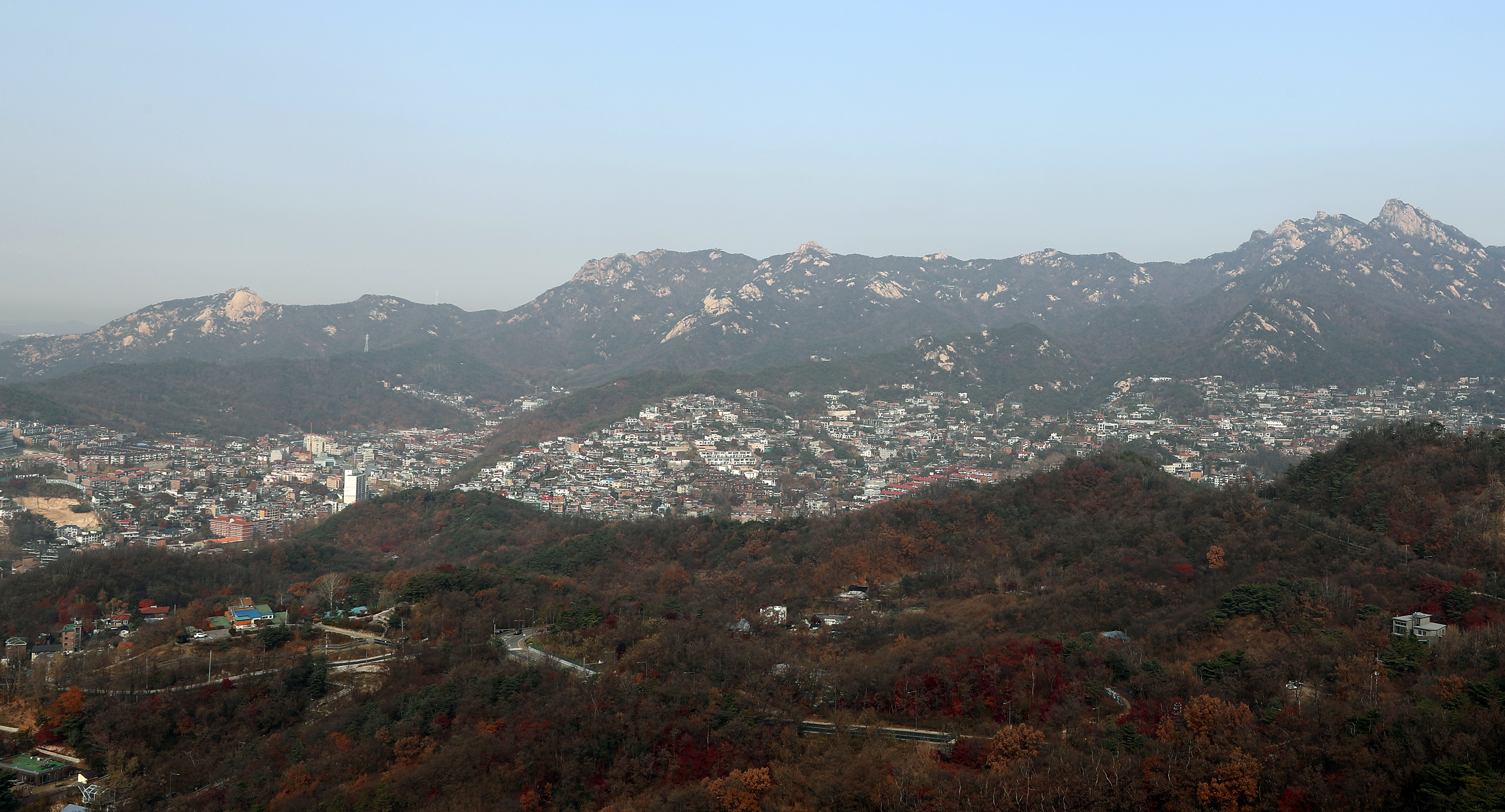
View from the mountain looking north (2016)

== See also ==
- List of mountains in Seoul
