= Gwanghwamun Square =

Public square in Seoul, South Korea

- Public square
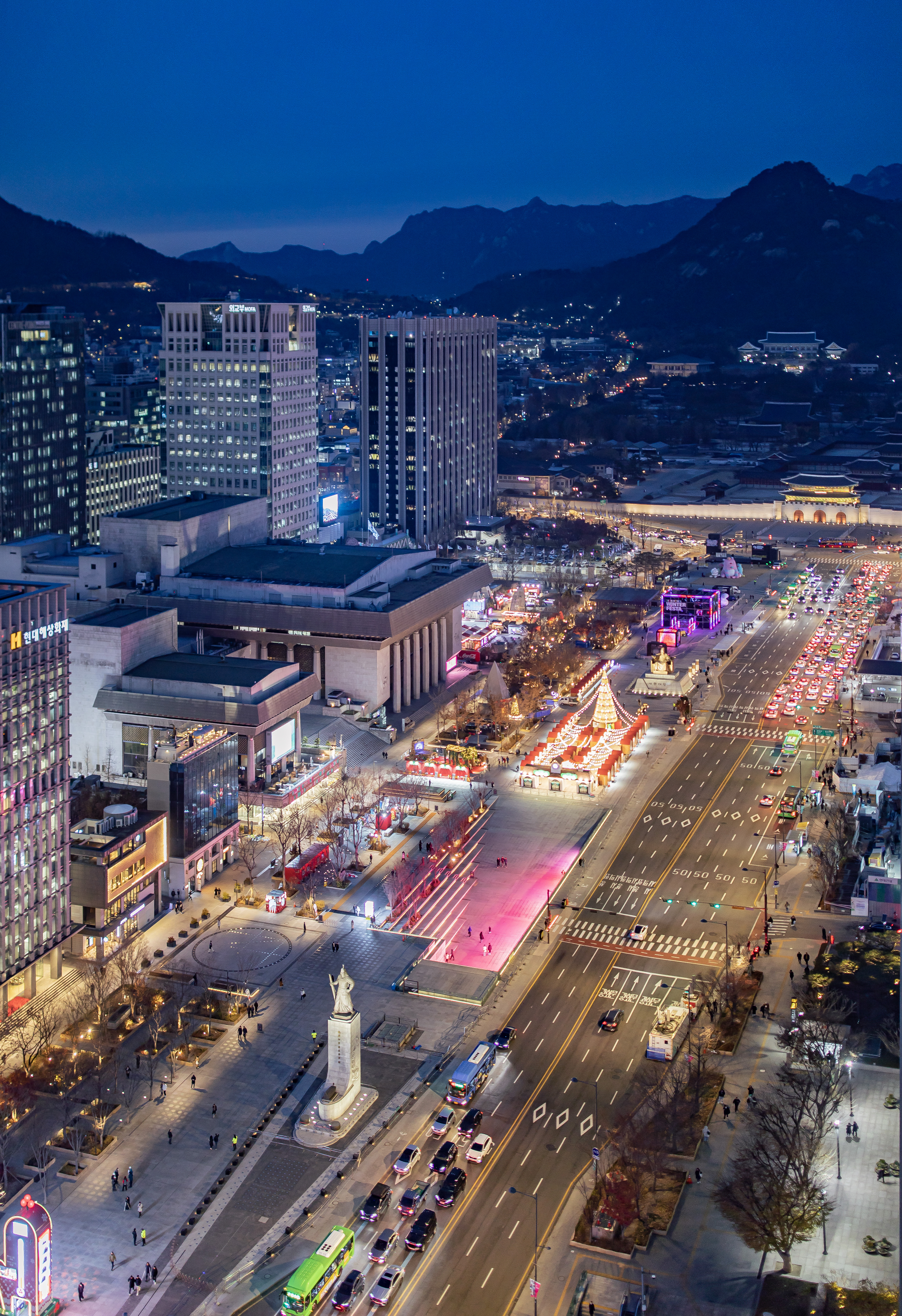
- The square in 2024. The statue of Admiral Yi Sun-sin is at the bottom, the statue of King Sejong the Great near the centre-right, Gyeongbokgung to the right, and the Blue House just above it.
- Features: Fountain, statues
- Opened: 1 August 2009
- Cost: ₩44.5 billion
- Owner: Seoul Metropolitan Government
- Location: Sejongno, Jongno District, Seoul, South Korea
- Interactive map of Gwanghwamun Square
- Coordinates: 37°34′22″N 126°58′36″E

Korean name
- Hangul: 광화문광장
- Hanja: 光化門廣場
- RR: Gwanghwamun gwangjang
- MR: Kwanghwamun kwangjang

Gwanghwamun Square (Korean: 광화문광장), a.k.a. Gwanghwamun Plaza, is a public square located in Sejongno, Jongno-gu, Seoul, in front of Gyeongbokgung. Serving as a public space and, at times, a road for centuries of Korean history, it is also historically significant as it is the location of royal administrative buildings, known as Yukjo-geori or Street of Six Ministries. Today, it features statues of Admiral Yi Sun-sin and of King Sejong the Great.

The logo of Gwanghwamun Square

== History ==
The area of Gwanghwamun Square has a long history, and by the Joseon period it had become the central point of Seoul. The square suffered neglect during the Japanese colonial period, faced damage during the Korean War, and then was used as a 16-lane roadway in the 20th century.

A new pedestrian-friendly, open urban space intended to restore the square was first announced in February 2004, along with projects for Namdaemun and Seoul Plaza, forming part of the city's urban renewal plans for environmentally friendly renovation projects. In December 2006, further plans for the square were announced. The project, in conjunction with the restoration of Gwanghwamun, was carried out by the Cultural Heritage Administration of Korea and scheduled for completion by August 2009. Construction of the square was originally scheduled to begin in February 2008; however, it was delayed because of opposition from the National Police Agency, who were concerned that the square could be abused as a venue for mass protests. Construction commenced on 23 April 2008, after the government decreed it a demonstration-free zone.

The plans included moving the old King Sejong statue from Deoksugung to the Square. However, after surveys of citizens and experts, it was decided to commission a new statue of King Sejong in a sitting position and chose the design in a competition between a shortlist of artists recommended by the Korean Fine Arts Association and universities.

The square was opened on 1 August 2009 after a renovation period of 15 months, which downsized the 600-meter Sejongno from 16 lanes to 10 lanes of traffic, at a cost of ₩44.5 billion. It is in front of Gwanghwamun and stretches south from the three-way intersection, along the front of the Sejong Center for the Performing Arts on the west side and Kyobo Book Centre on the east side, to the Sejong-ro intersection, where the statue of the Admiral Yi Sun-sin stands. At its opening, the square was covered with a 162 m-long (531 ft) and 17.5 m-wide (57 ft) flower carpet, with 224,537 flowers representing the number of days from when Seoul was declared the capital on 28 October 1394, to the opening of the square on 1 August 2009.

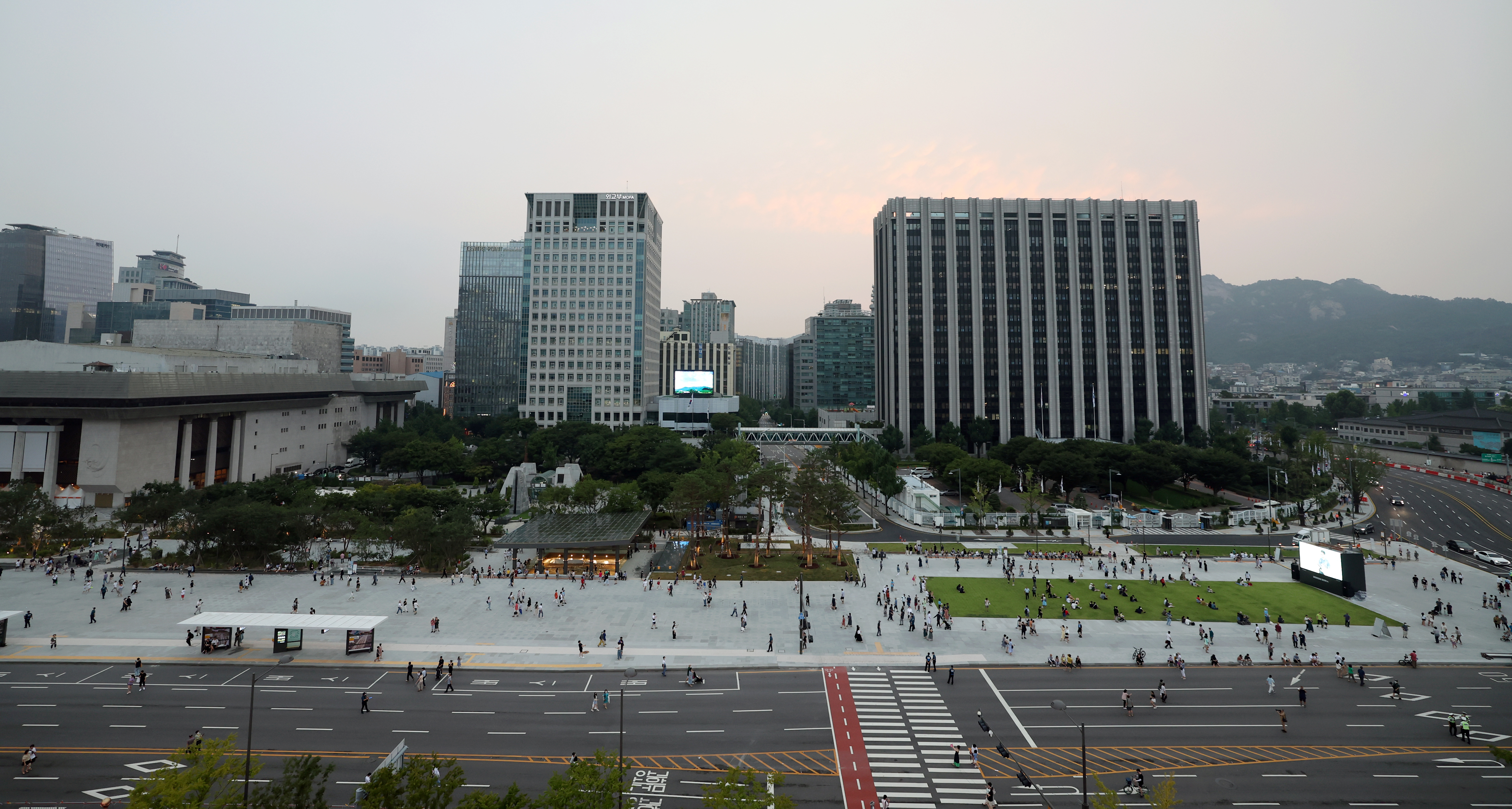
Redesigned Gwanghwamun Square (2022)

From end of 2020 to August 2022, Gwanghwamun Square was closed and redesigned. During the renovation, Sejong-daero was reduced to 6 lanes and the pedestrian plaza more than doubled in size. The expanded plaza reopened on 6 August 2022.

== Landmarks ==
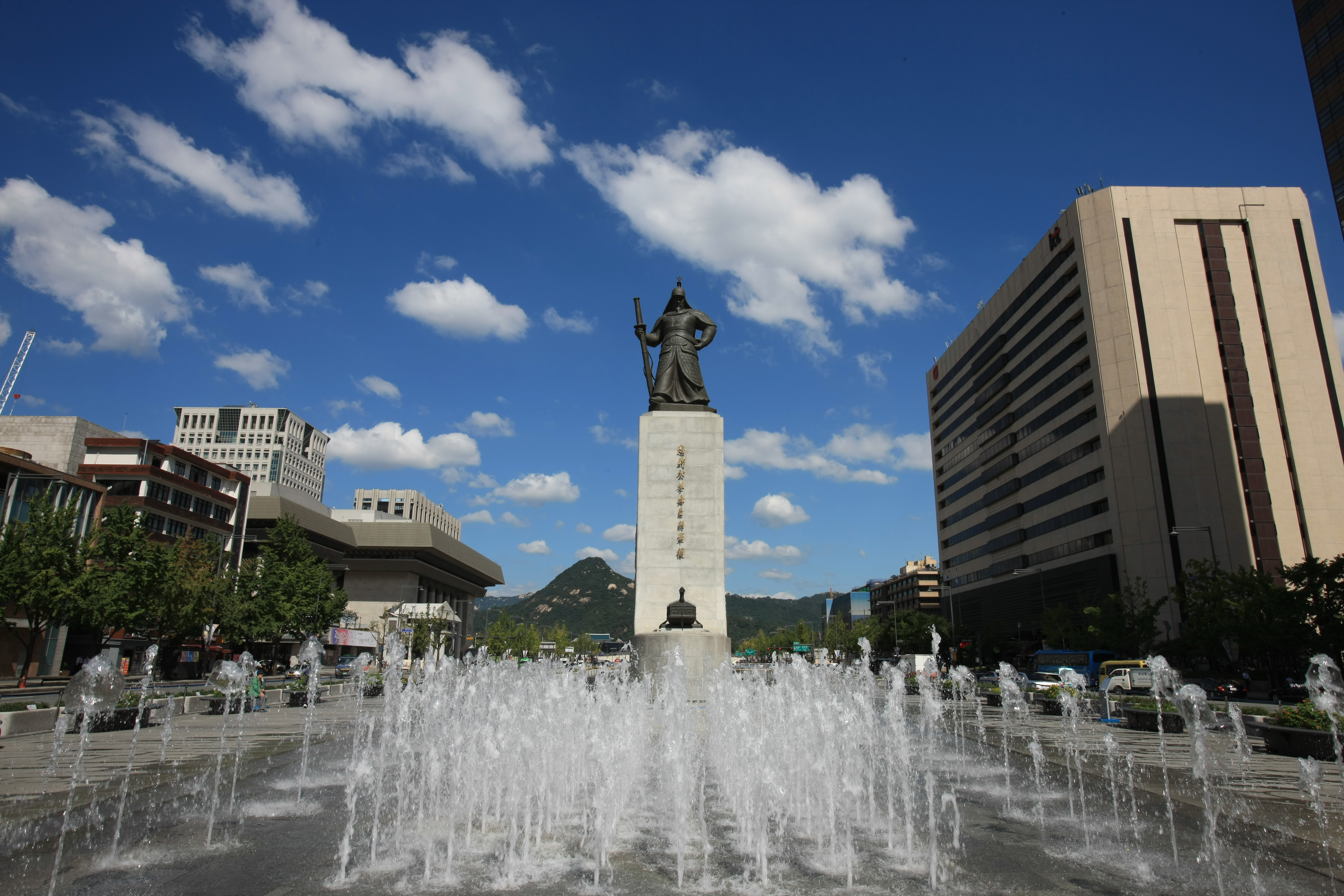
The Statue of Admiral Yi Sun-sin and the 12.23 Fountain (2011)

The square features a water fountain in honor of the achievements of Admiral Yi Sun-sin. It is named the 12.23 Fountain after the 23 battles he fought with 12 warships during the 1592–1598 Japanese invasions of Korea. The water jets rise to a height of 18 meters along with 300 smaller jets, which symbolize the battles he fought on the sea. It also has a waterway, two centimeters deep and one meter across, at 365 meters along the square's east side. The waterway's floor has 617 stones recording the major events from 1392 to 2008.

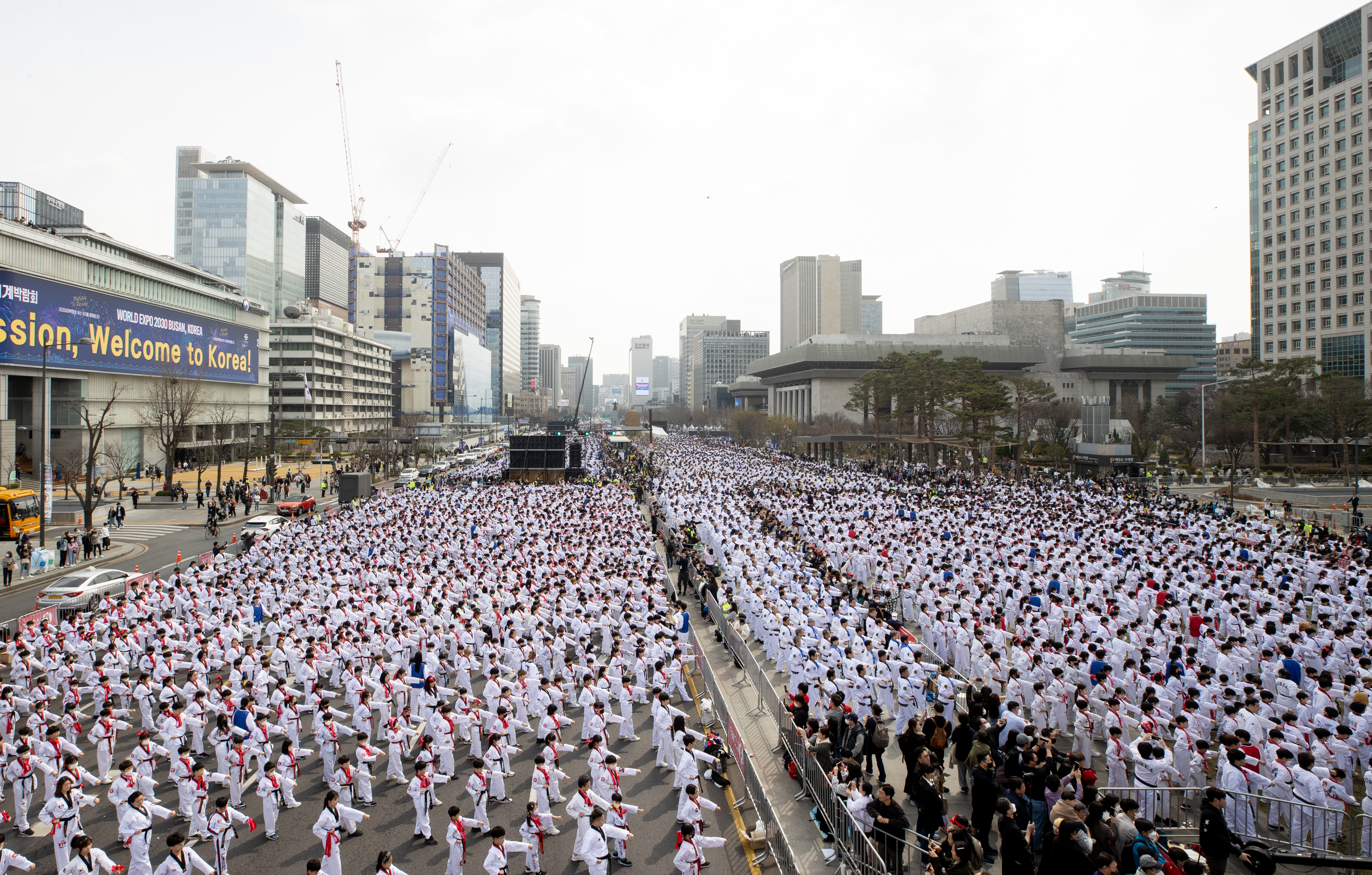
The Kukki Taekwondo Festival in the square (2023)

The fountain is located next to the statue of Admiral Yi Sun-shin. This statue was erected on 27 April 1968. On 9 October 2009, two months after the Square's opening, a second statue, the 6.2-meter high, 20-ton bronze statue of King Sejong the Great of Joseon was unveiled to the public. It is located 250 meters behind the statue of the Admiral Yi Sun-sin. It was dedicated on Hangul Day in celebration of the 563rd anniversary of the invention of the Korean alphabet by King Sejong.

Underneath the statues, there is a small exhibition hall and museum that memorialize Admiral Yi Sun-Shin and King Sejong.

== Administration ==
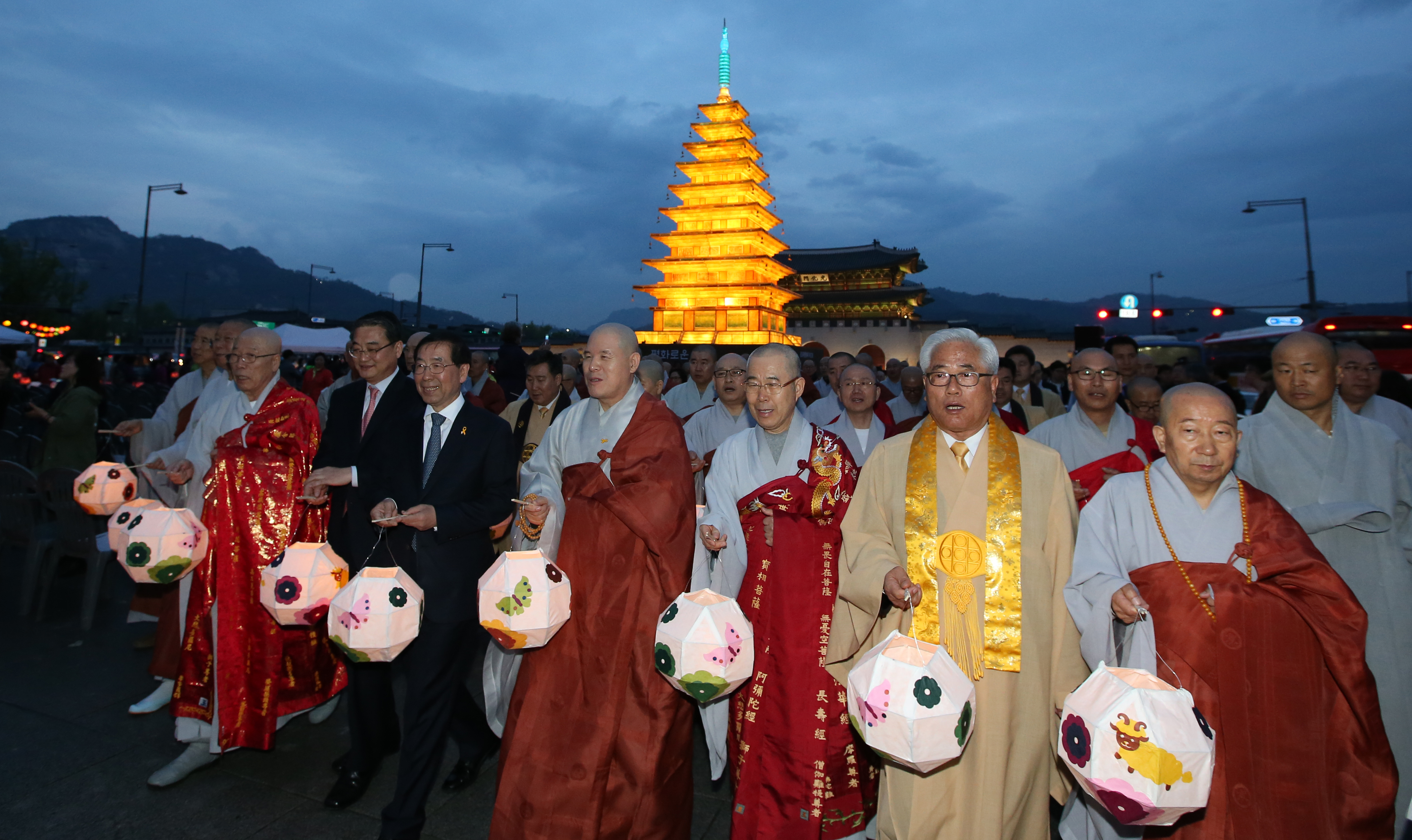
Celebrating Buddha's Birthday in the square (2015)

Rallies and demonstrations are illegal at the Square; the Seoul Metropolitan Government has decreed that it is to be used for cultural exhibitions.

As of 1 June 2011, the Square along with Seoul Plaza are designated as smoke-free zones by the Seoul Metropolitan Government. Smokers who violate the law are fined ₩100,000.

On 23 September 2012, on a trial basis, the government designated a 550-m section of Sejong-ro as pedestrian- and cyclist-only. The section starts from the road at the Gwanghwamun three-way intersection, goes along the plaza in front of the Sejong Center for the Performing Arts, and ends at the Sejong-ro intersection.

== Events ==
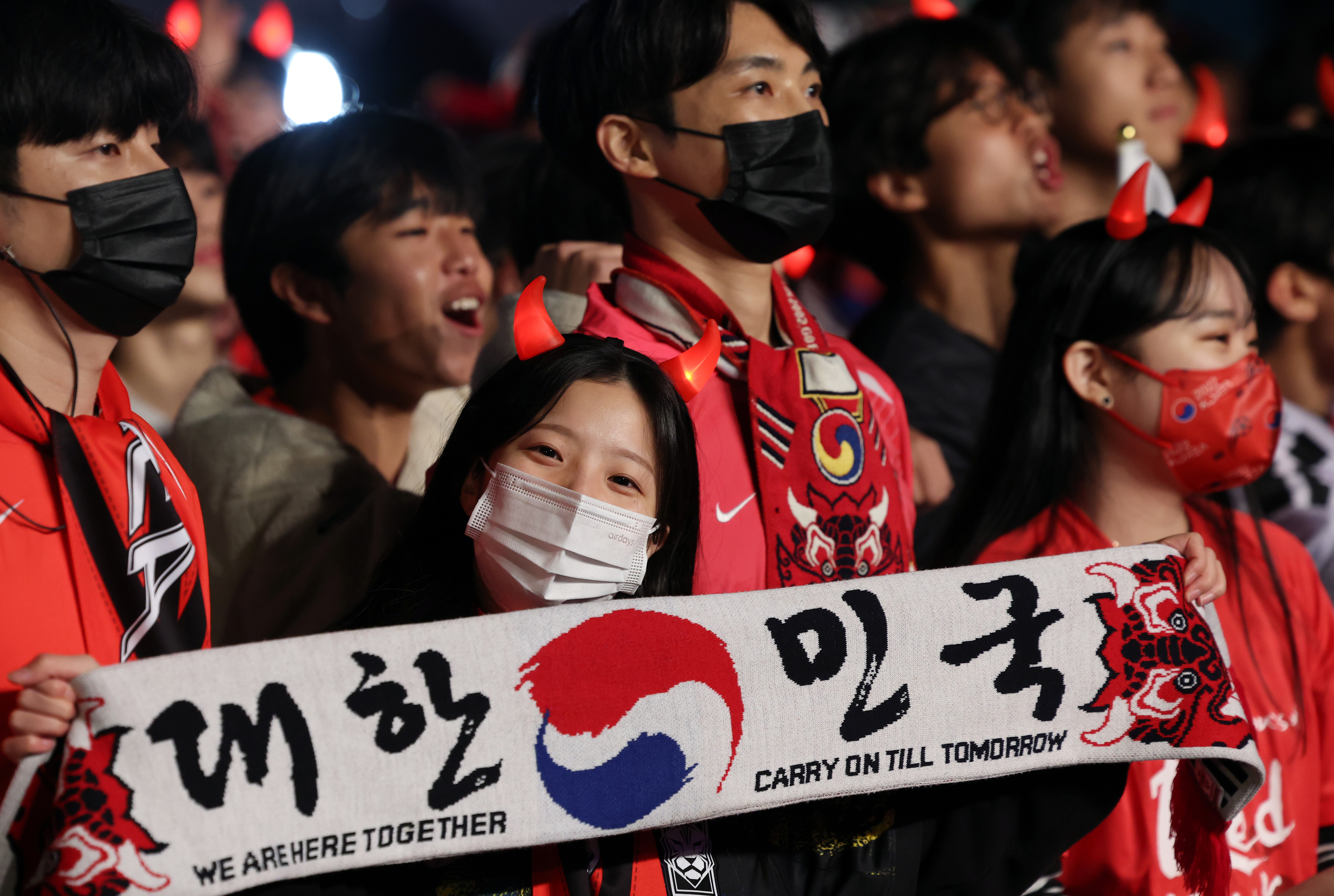
Crowds cheering for Korea during the 2022 FIFA World Cup in the square

The Square is the starting location of the annual Seoul International Marathon, which finishes within the Olympic Stadium.

In the first winter after its opening, the Square hosted an open-air ice rink from 12 December 2009 to 15 February 2010. The public rink was 2,250 sq. m, which was larger than the one at Seoul Plaza at 2,100 sq. m.

The plaza was one of the sites of street cheering during the 2022 FIFA World Cup.

The square was a major site of the 2016–17 protests against Park Geun-hye's government.

== In popular culture ==
On 29 November 2009, parts of Sejong-ro were closed to traffic for twelve hours to film lengthy gunfight scenes for Korean Broadcasting System (KBS)'s 2009 spy action television drama series "Iris," starring Lee Byung-hun, Kim Tae-hee, Jung Joon-ho, Kim Seung-woo and Kim So-yeon. The five lanes along the square in front of the Sejong Center for the Performing Arts were closed to traffic from 07:00 to 19:00, while the five lanes on the Kyobo Book Centre side remains open to traffic. This marks the first time the Seoul Metropolitan Government has granted permission to block traffic along the square for filming and it is part of the government's plans to promote the city's major tourist attractions, including Cheonggye Stream and Han River.

On 26 July 2012 at 23:00, boy band Beast held a guerrilla concert at the Gwanghwamun end of the square in front of an audience of 4,000 people. It was part of their promotion for their fifth mini album "Midnight Sun," and the performance was broadcast on SBS's music show "Inkigayo."

In 2012, the square was used as a filming location for tvN drama "Queen and I." The two lead characters Kim Boong-do and Choi Hee-jin (played by Ji Hyun-woo and Yoo In-na, respectively) share a kiss dubbed the "Gwanghwamun kiss" against the backdrop of Gwanghwamun.

Kyuhyun, of boy band Super Junior, used the location as a theme for his 2014 chart-topping single, "At Gwanghwamun." His label-mate Jo Sung-mo, of TRAX, recorded a live electric guitar cover of the song with Gwanghwamun Gate in the background.

In February 2026, it was announced that boy band BTS would hold a concert titled "BTS The Comeback Live | Arirang" on 21 March 2026, and that the performance would be broadcast live globally on Netflix. It was the band's first concert together since 2022 following a hiatus to fulfill their mandatory military duties. The event drew over 100,000 attendees, fewer than the 260,000 people anticipated, while an estimated 18.4 million people worldwide watched the broadcast on Netflix. It was hosted and organized by Big Hit Music and Hybe.

== Transport ==
- Gwanghwamun Station on Seoul Subway Line 5: Exit 9 - Haechi Madang, an underground walkway that connects the station to the Plaza

== See also ==
- Cheonggyecheon
- Blue House
- Gyeongbokgung
