= Statue of Admiral Yi Sun-sin =

Monument in Seoul, South Korea

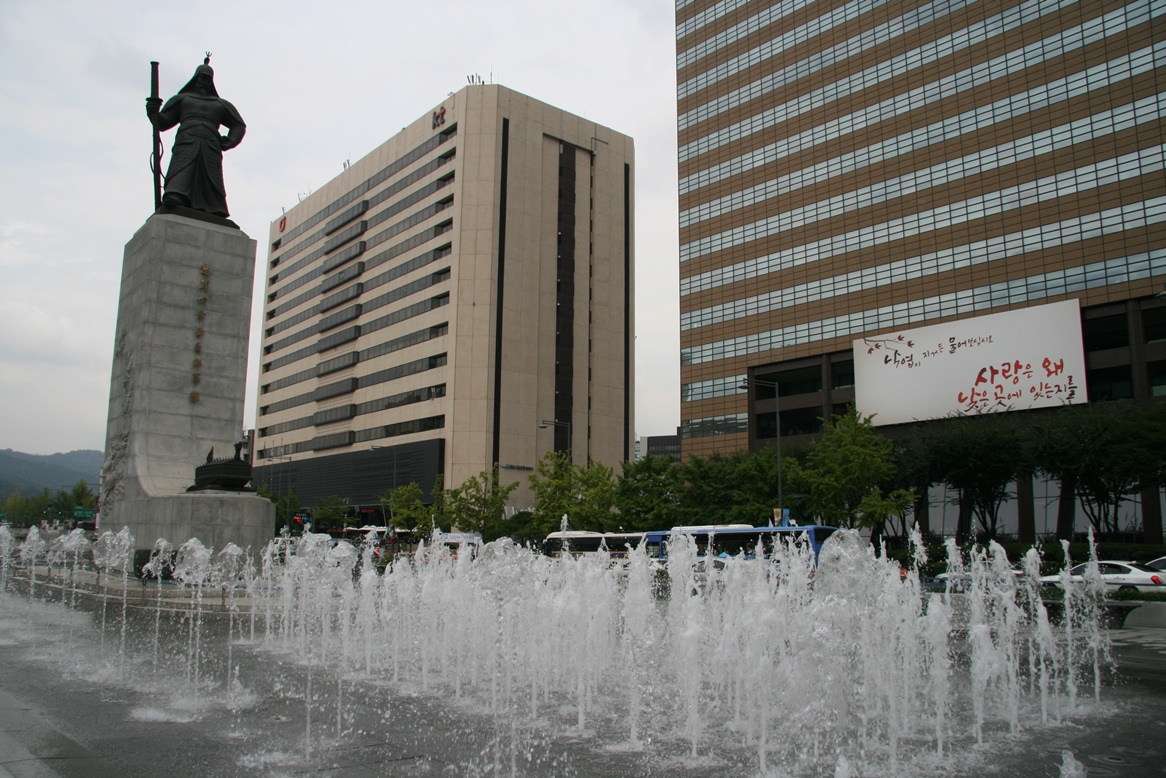
- Statue of Admiral Yi Sun-sin with the 12.23 Fountain in front in 2012
- Interactive map of Statue of Admiral Yi Sun-sin
- Location: Sejongno, Gwanghwamun Plaza, Seoul, South Korea
- Designer: Kim Sae-jung
- Height: 17 metres (56 ft) (including pedestal)
- Completion date: 27 April 1968
- Restored date: November–December 2010
- Dedicated to: Yi Sun-sin

Korean name
- Hangul: 충무공 이순신 동상
- Hanja: 忠武公李舜臣銅像
- RR: Chungmugong I Sunsin dongsang
- MR: Ch'ungmugong I Sunsin tongsang

The statue of Admiral Yi Sun-sin (Korean: 충무공 이순신 동상) is located at the street Sejongno, Gwanghwamun Plaza, Seoul, South Korea. It is dedicated to the 16th-century Korean war hero, admiral Yi Sun-sin. It is considered one of Seoul's major landmarks and has been called "one of the most important instances of Korean public art".

The statue itself is 6.5 meters tall, made from bronze, and is mounted on a pillar 10.5 meters tall. It depicts a standing figure of the admiral, who is holding a sword in his right hand. A miniature turtle ship, a type of contemporary Korean war vessel commanded by Yi Sun-sin, is also located in front of the statue. Two models of war drums are also present near the statue.

== History ==
This statue was erected on 27 April 1968 in the presence of the presidential pair. It was designed by Kim Se-jung (Seechong, 1928–1986), a sculptor and professor of art at Seoul National University, aided by the historians from the National Institute of Korean History. It was the first statue built by the Statue Establishing Committee led by Kim Jong-pil who was asked by President Park Chung Hee: “Build a statue of a person most feared and admired by the Japanese in the Sejong-no intersection.” The raising of the statue, also a part of a renovation of the Gwanghwamun Plaza, was one of the symbols of modernization and rebuilding of Korea. The armored figure of the war hero has also been considered a symbol of the former military government of South Korea. At the time of its unveiling it was the tallest standing statue in Asia.

In 2005, the South Korean government considered moving the statue to another location, but after a public debate the plans were cancelled. In November 2010, the statue was removed for 40 days to undergo restoration works. Moving for the first time in 42 years, it was lifted by a 200-ton crane and transported to a factory in Icheon, Gyeonggi Province. It underwent sand-blasting to remove rust, grime from roadside pollution; and repainted before returning to the Plaza. Other works included fortifying the inner skeleton and the restored statue was unveiled to the public on 23 December 2010. While the statue was being renovated, it was replaced by 3 m long, 3 m wide and 6 m high rectangular column displaying life-size photos of the statue. Throughout its four decades, the statue color has changed from bronze to deep green hue and it was decided the renovated statue would be a mix of both colors. During the renovation, Korean public and historians also debated whether his face, sword or armor (the last two criticized by some for not appearing Korean enough) are accurately represented.

There is also a water fountain next to the statue in honor of Admiral Yi Sun-sin's achievements. It is named the 12.23 Fountain to commemorate the 23 battles he fought with 12 warships, when he led Koreans to victory during the Japanese invasions of Korea. The water jets rises to a height of 18 meters along with 300 smaller jets, which symbolize the battles he fought on the sea. A small museum is located underneath the statue.

The Admiral Yi Sun-sin statue is located 250 meters from the other large statue on the Plaza, the statue of King Sejong.

== See also ==
- Statue of King Sejong (Gwanghwamun): nearby statue
- Yi Sun-sin Bridge: bridge in Yeosu, dedicated to Yi
- Yi Sun-sin Stadium: in Asan
