= Pyeong-dong, Seoul =

Coordinates: 37°15′N 126°59′E

Pyeong-dong
- Interactive map of Pyeong-dong
- Country: South Korea

Area
  - Total: 0.08 km^{2} (0.031 sq mi)

Korean name
- Hangul: 평동
- Hanja: 平洞
- RR: Pyeong-dong
- MR: P'yŏng-dong

Pyeong-dong (Korean: 평동) is a dong (neighbourhood) of Jongno District, Seoul, South Korea. It is a legal dong (법정동 法定洞) administered under its administrative dong (행정동 行政洞), Gyonam-dong.

== See also ==
- Administrative divisions of South Korea
