= Statue of King Sejong (Gwanghwamun) =

Monument in Seoul, South Korea

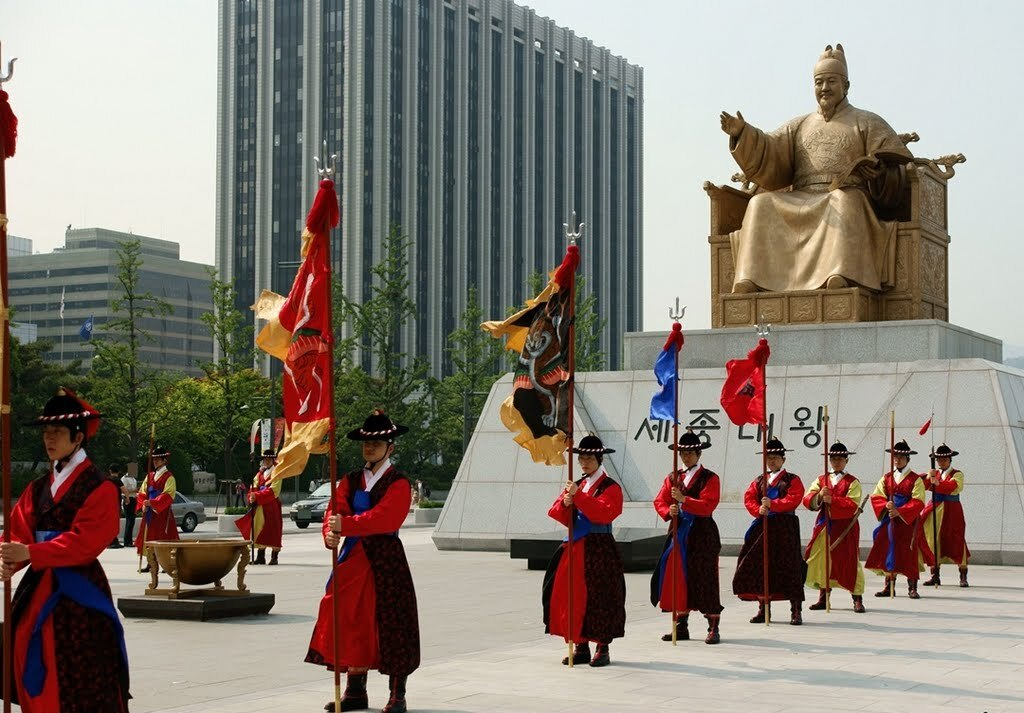
- Interactive map of Statue of King Sejong
- Location: Sejongno, Gwanghwamun Plaza, Seoul, South Korea
- Designer: Kim Yeong-won
- Type: Statue
- Height: 6.2 meters (20 ft)
- Weight: 20 tons
- Dedicated date: 9 October 2009
- Dedicated to: Sejong the Great

Korean name
- Hangul: 세종대왕 동상
- Hanja: 世宗大王銅像
- RR: Sejong daewang dongsang
- MR: Sejong taewang tongsang

Statue of King Sejong (Korean: 세종대왕 동상) is located at the Sejongno, Gwanghwamun Plaza in Downtown Seoul, South Korea. It is dedicated to the 15th century Korean monarch, Sejong the Great, the fourth king of Joseon dynasty and one of Korea's most famous historical figures. The statue is considered one of Seoul's major landmarks. Unveiled in 2009, it has been called "South Korea's most iconic statue."

The statue was constructed as part of the creation of new public space in Downtown Seoul, the Gwanghwamun Plaza, located next to the Gyeongbokgung Palace complex. The statue of King Sejong was designed by Kim Yeong-won, a carving and modeling professor at Hongik University. Early plans for the Gwanghwamun Plaza included moving the statue of King Sejong from Deoksugung palace complex to the Gwanghwamun Plaza. However, after public discussions involving surveys of citizens and experts, it was decided to commission a new statue of King Sejong. Its design was chosen after a competition between a shortlist of artists recommended by the Korean Fine Arts Association and universities. The new statue was designed to be sitting, unlike the nearby older standing statue of Admiral Yi Sun-sin. King Sejong statue is located 250 meters from the other large statue on the Gwanghwamun Plaza, the statue of the Admiral Yi Sun-sin.

The statue of King Sejong was dedicated on 9 October 2009, in a ceremony attended by President Lee Myung-bak and other South Korean government officials, on a Hangul Day in celebration of the 563rd anniversary of the invention of the Korean alphabet by King Sejong, two months after the Gwanghwamun Plaza opening. The golden statue is 6.2 meters high, 4.3 meters wide, and weighs 20 tons. The king has one hand raised and the other holding a book. Sides of the statue display all of the Hangul alphabet characters. In front of the statue there are small models of a celestial globe, a rain gauge, and a sundial, the invention of which is also traditionally attributed to King Sejong by South Koreans. While King Sejong is best remembered for his invention of Hangul, he is also considered to have been involved in promotion of agriculture, literature, science and technology, as well as Confucian philosophy in South Korea.

Near the statue a 'Sejong's Story' an exhibition hall, a small museum dedicated to King Sejong, can be found.
