= Provisional Government of the Republic of Korea Memorial Hall =

There are a number of memorial halls to the Provisional Government of the Republic of Korea.

== In South Korea ==
- National Memorial of the Korean Provisional Government in Seoul
- Kim Koo Museum in Seoul
- Gyeonggyojang in Seoul

== In China ==
- Provisional Government of the Republic of Korea Memorial Hall, Changsha
- Provisional Government of the Republic of Korea Memorial Hall, Chongqing
- Provisional Government of the Republic of Korea Memorial Hall, Hangzhou
- Provisional Government of the Republic of Korea Memorial Hall, Liuzhou
- Provisional Government of the Republic of Korea Memorial Hall, Shanghai
- Kim Ku hideout (Meiwan Street)
- Kim Ku hideout (Nanbei Lake)
