= Kim Shin (general) =

South Korean general (1922–2016)

The Right Honourable Lieutenant General Kim Shin
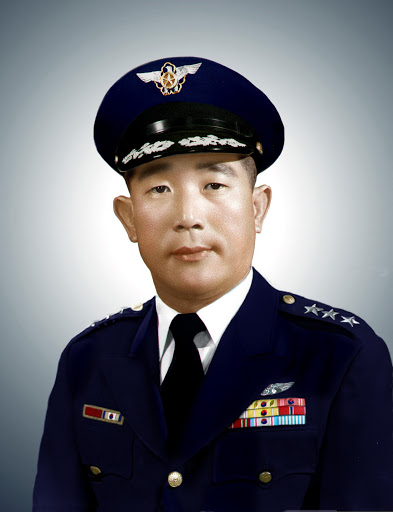
- Kim upon his appointment as Chief of Staff (August 1, 1960)

21st Minister of Transport
- In office November 24, 1971 – September 18, 1974
- President: Park Chung Hee
- Preceded by: Chang Sung-hwan
- Succeeded by: Choe Gyeong-rok

South Korea Ambassador to Taiwan
- In office September 3, 1962 – January 10, 1971
- President: Park Chung Hee
- Preceded by: Choe Yong-deok
- Succeeded by: Kim Gye-won

Chief of Staff of the Air Force
- In office August 1, 1960 – August 1, 1962
- Preceded by: Kim Chang-gyu
- Succeeded by: Chang Sung-hwan

Personal details
- Born: September 21, 1922 Shanghai, Republic of China
- Died: May 19, 2016 (aged 93) Seoul, South Korea
- Resting place: Daejeon National Cemetery
- Relations: Kim Ku (father); Kwak Nak-won (grandmother)
- Education: Korea National Defense University; United States Air Force Academy; Republic of China Air Force Academy; National Southwestern Associated University
- Awards: Order of Merit for National Foundation

Korean name
- Hangul: 김신
- Hanja: 金信
- RR: Gim Sin
- MR: Kim Sin

Kim Shin (Korean: 김신; Hanja: 金信; September 21, 1922 – May 19, 2016) was a lieutenant general of the South Korean Air Force, a Korean independence activist, a politician, and a diplomat.

He was the son of Kim Ku. He spent much of his early life in exile in China alongside his father, older brother Kim In, and grandmother Kwak Nak-won. There, he participated in the Korean independence movement; for these activities he was eventually awarded the Order of Merit for National Foundation, grade 5 in 1990. He eventually became interested in becoming a pilot, and enrolled in the Republic of China Air Force Academy. He received training there, in Lahore, British India, and in San Antonio, Texas. He eventually returned to the liberated Korean peninsula in 1947.

He served with distinction in the Korean War, in which he flew in numerous combat operations. Afterwards, he served as Chief of Staff for Personnel and Administration and then as Chief of Staff for the Republic of Korea Air Force Headquarters. He later served as 6th Ambassador to Taiwan, the 21st Minister of Transport, and a member of the 9th National Assembly. In his later life, he worked on the National Conference for Unification chaired the Independence Hall of Korea, and led the Association of Commemorative Services for Patriot Kim Koo.

He died on May 19, 2016, and was buried in the Daejeon National Cemetery.

== Early life ==
Kim was born on September 21, 1922, in Shanghai, Republic of China. His father was notable Korean independence activist Kim Ku, and his mother was mother was Ch'oe Chun-rye (1889 – January 1, 1924). He had an older brother, Kim In. He was born into the Andong Kim clan.

Kim spent much of his early life during the Japanese occupation of Korea. His father was a prominent member of the Korean Provisional Government (KPG) and seen as a leader in the independence movement.

Kim's mother died when Kim was two years old. Afterwards, he and his paternal grandmother Kwak Nak-won left Kim Ku in China, and returned to the family's native Hwanghae Province in Korea. There, Kim Shin attended the Anshin School. He then rejoined his father in China in 1934. He attended the Tunxi Middle School in Anhui, and graduated from a middle school affiliated with National Central University (now Nanjing University) in Chongqing.

During the Second Sino-Japanese War in 1937, he experienced Japanese bombing runs while in Nanjing. This left a significant impact on him, as he decided that air power would be important for achieving Korea's independence.

He graduated from the National Southwestern Associated University in Kunming. Around this time, he also served in the KPG in the Ministry of Internal Affairs.

== Military career ==
In 1944, Kim enrolled in the Republic of China Air Force Academy (CAFA). As there was no adequate places for flight training in China, Kim received training from the US Air Force in Lahore, British India.

In August 1945, Korea was liberated. Kim was in the midst of his training in Lahore, and wished to immediately return to the Korean peninsula with his father. However, his father insisted that Kim finish his training in the United States, with the explanation that Kim could serve as a conduit for relations between the KPG and the US. Kim arrived in New York in December 1945. He then went to the Randolph Air Force Base near San Antonio, Texas. After graduating, Kim arrived in Shanghai at the end of August 1947, and then went to Nanjing to complete his training and graduate from the CAFA.

In early September 1947, for the first time in 13 years, he returned to the liberated Korean peninsula. He then joined his father at his father's residence and headquarters, Gyeonggyojang. There, he joined the South Korean Constabulary of Police Reserve and participated in the Republic of Korea Army Aviation Command (대한민국 육군 항공대).

He joined his father in attending the 1948 North–South Korea conference in Pyongyang. There, he shook hands with Kim Il Sung, who reportedly said to him: "Comrade, good work in taking care of your father's journey here". (Note: 『동무, 아버님을 모시고 오느라 수고 많았소』)

Kim was a founding member of Republic of Korea Air Force (ROKAF), which was established in 1948. In 1949, his father was assassinated. According to Kim's later memoirs, in the aftermath of the assassination, Kim was treated with suspicion by the higher ups in both the government and the ROKAF. Frustrated with constant monitoring of his superiors, Kim mockingly filed a report saying that he was going to fly over to the North. This caused his superiors to prevent Kim from flying. At one point, a young man who claimed to be sent from Kim Il Sung asked Kim for help in assassinating the South Korean president Syngman Rhee. Kim found this suspicious, and went to his superiors with the story. According to Kim, the young man was sent as a trap by South Korean intelligence agents.

=== Korean War ===
On June 26, 1950, a day after the outbreak of the Korean War, Kim and other executives in the ROKAF went over to Japan in order to facilitate the acquisition of F-51 Mustang jets from the United States Air Force. There, he received less than a week of training and returned to Korea for combat. In August 1951, he fought over Jirisan and in October he flew in a solo sortie operation. He ended up fighting in 19 battles during this time.

During the war, Kim served as the leader of the 10th Fighter Wing (제10전투비행전) and as the Director of Operations (작전국장) in the Republic of Korea Air Force Headquarters.

In January 1952, he successfully completed a bombing operation of a Sungho County rail bridge. This was seen as a significant feat by his contemporaries, as UN forces had made over 500 attempts to destroy the bridge previously.

=== Later military career ===
After the war, he served at the ROKAF Headquarters as Chief of Staff for Personnel and Administration (행정참모부장). From August 1960 to 1962, he served as the Chief of Staff of the Republic of Korea Air Force. During his tenure, he introduced the use of the T-28 for training purposes. He also acquired GAR-8 missiles, which were the ROKAF's first guided missiles.

During his tenure, the May 16 coup occurred, in which Park Chung Hee seized power and established a military dictatorship. According to Kim's memoirs, Kim witnessed a meeting between US General Carter Magruder and Park, in which Magruder asked Park to relinquish power. Park supposedly smiled and declined this request.

In 1961, he served as a leader in the military junta, the Supreme Council for National Reconstruction.

== Later career ==
After 1962, he worked in various roles. Beginning in September 1962, he worked for decades as the 6th Ambassador to Taiwan. He also worked as the 21st Minister of Transport. He also served as a member of the 9th National Assembly, and on the National Conference for Unification. He also became the first chairman of the Independence Hall of Korea.

In 1988, he retired from public roles and became honorary chairman of the Association of Commemorative Services for Patriot Kim Koo (백범김구선생사업협회). In this role, it was reported that by 2019, Kim Shin oversaw the distribution of around ₩42 billion ($36,000,000) to various organizations in order to promote Korea–US ties and publicize information about the Korean independence movement. This includes Harvard University, Brown University, Tufts University, and the Korea Society. However, as Kim did not properly file tax documents for his donations to foreign institutions, the Kim family were ordered to repay taxes amounting to ₩27 billion ($23,000,000).

After diplomatic relations were established between South Korea in China in 1986, Kim visited mainland China for the first time in 40 years. In 1990, he organized and participated in a ceremony at the Beijing Great Hall of the People that honored a Chinese translation of his father's autobiography, the Baekbeomilji.

In late 2013, he published his memoirs, entitled To Fly Korea's Skies (조국의 하늘을 날다; 2013). Kim wrote of his autobiography: (Note: 『1922년생인 내게 역사란 고난의 다른 이름이었다. 백범 김구의 가족'이라는 사실은 크나큰 자랑이자 버거운 숙명이었다. 우리 현대사의 한 자락을 조금이나마 더 밝혀주지 않을까 하는 기대로 책을 썼다』)

For me, who was born in 1922, 'history' was just another word for 'suffering'. Being 'the family of Kim Ku' is a great pride but a burdensome fate. The reason I wrote this book was to shed some light on our modern history.

== Death ==
He died at 12:22 am on May 19, 2016. He had a funeral ceremony in Seoul. His burial was held at 11:00 am at Lot 377 of the 2nd Cemetery of the Daejeon National Cemetery.

== Personal life ==
He had five children, including Kim Yang, who worked as Korean Consulate General in Shanghai in 2005 and as the Minister of Patriots and Veteran Affairs of Korea.

Kim was a Christian.

== Awards ==
In 1990, the South Korean government awarded him the Order of Merit for National Foundation, grade 5. Kim also has the Order of Military Merit, classes two through four.
