= Kim Shin =

- Hangul: 김신
- RR: Gim Sin
- MR: Kim Sin

Kim Shin, a Korean name consisting of the family name Kim and the given name Shin, may refer to:

- Kim Shin (general), founding member of Republic of Korea Air Force
- Kim Shin (footballer), K League player
