= Museum of Japanese Colonial History in Korea =

History museum in Seoul, South Korea

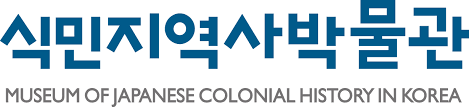

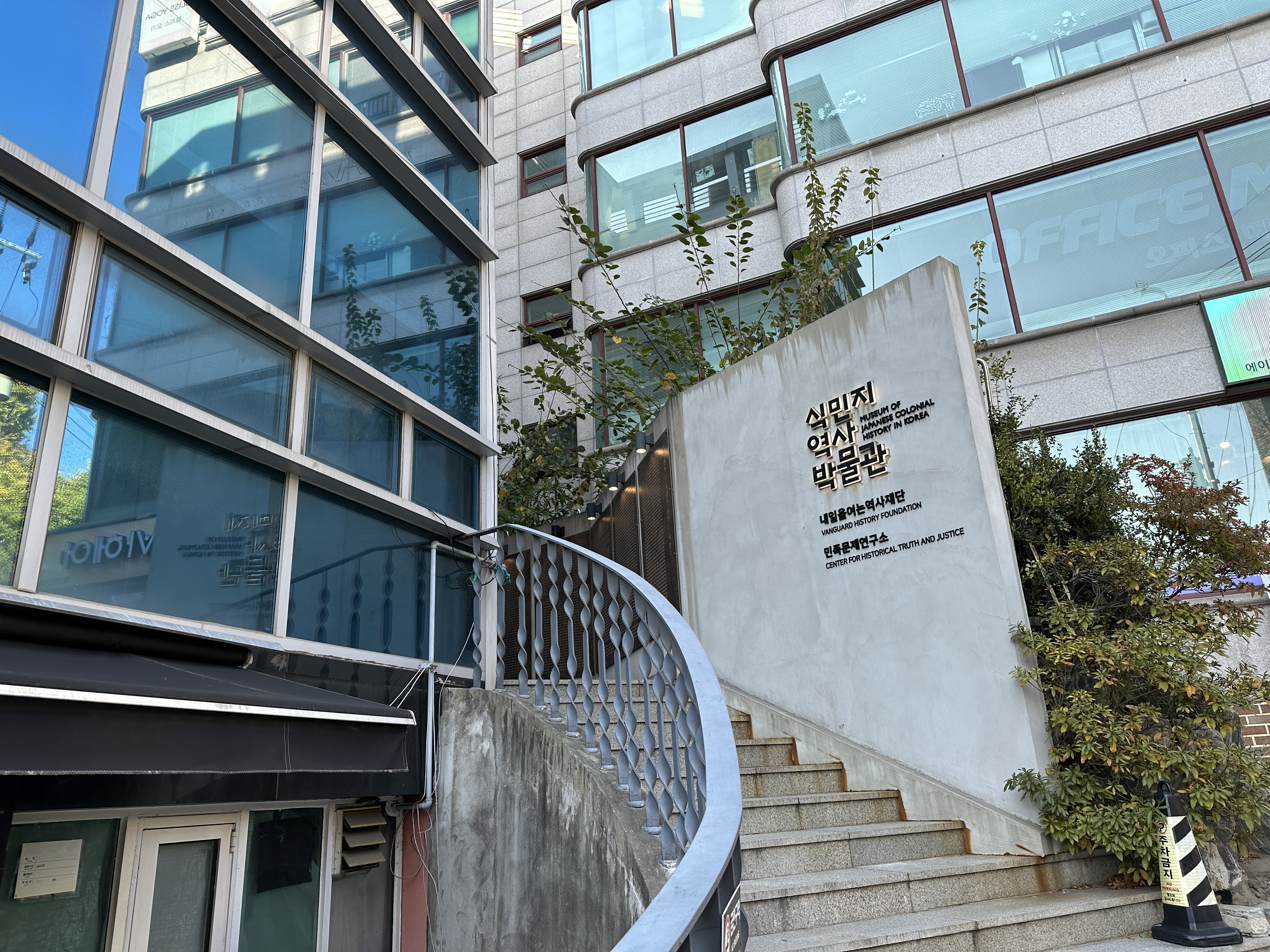
- The museum entrance (2023)
- Established: August 29, 2018
- Location: 27 Cheongpa-ro 47da-gil, Yongsan District, Seoul, South Korea
- Coordinates: 37.545747717533274°N 126.96683166871598°E
- Type: History museum
- Collection size: 70,000 (2018)
- Owner: Center for Historical Truth and Justice
- Website: historymuseum.or.kr (in Korean)

Korean name
- Hangul: 식민지역사박물관
- Hanja: 植民地歷史博物館
- RR: Singminji yeoksa bangmulgwan
- MR: Singminji yŏksa pangmulgwan

The Museum of Japanese Colonial History in Korea (Korean: 식민지역사박물관) is a privately owned history museum in the Yongsan District of Seoul, South Korea. Its collections cover the period between 1910 and 1945 when Korea was under Japanese rule. The museum is operated by Center for Historical Truth and Justice.

== Collections ==
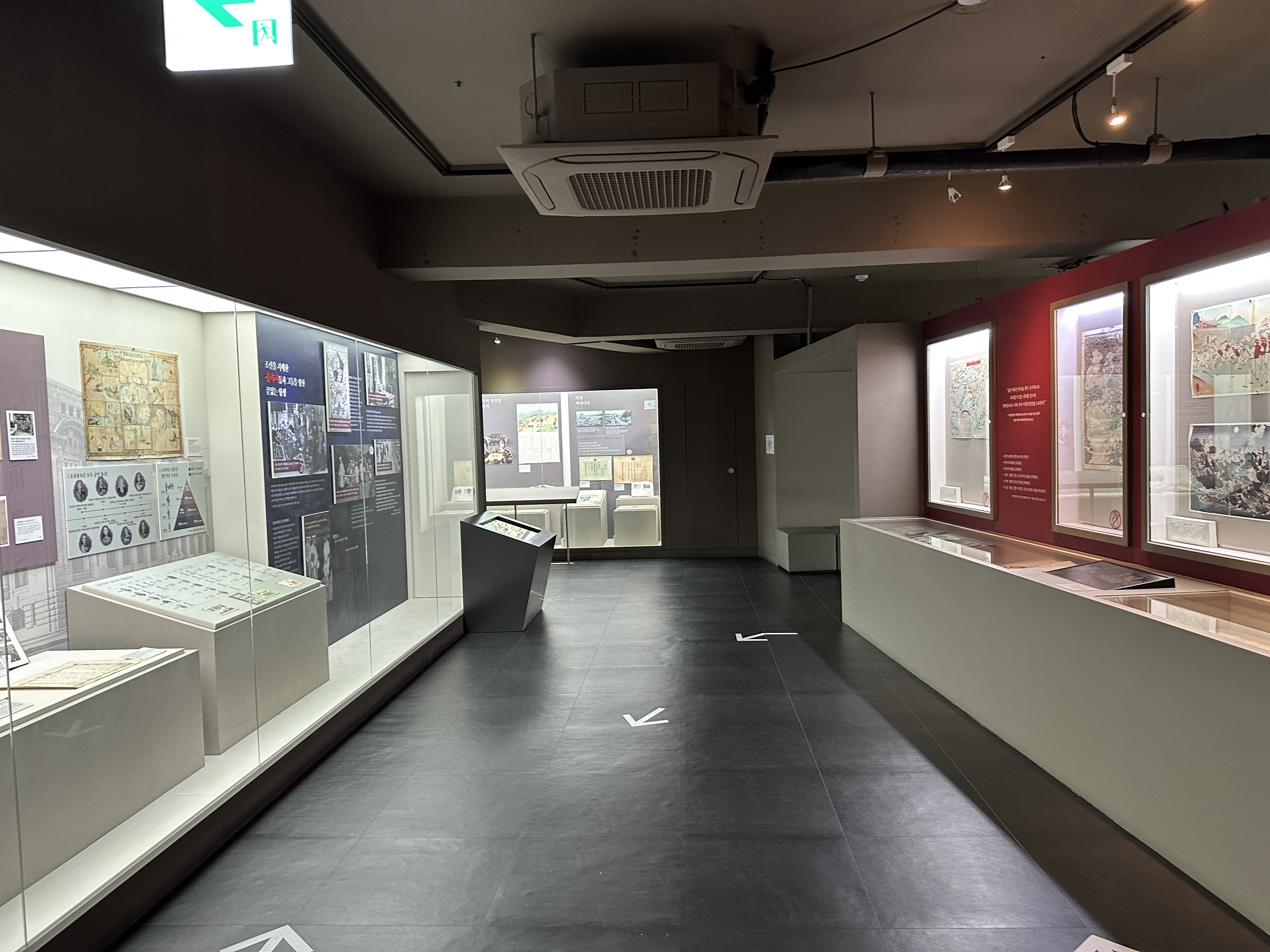
Exhibits on the second floor (2023)

The museum's permanent collection comprises over 70,000 artifacts from the colonial period. It has a full original copy of the Korean Declaration of Independence. The museum also has a copy of the autobiography of Kim Ku: the Diary of Kim Ku. Most of the collection consists of the everyday lives of normal people during the colonial period. A portion of the museum discusses ethnic Korean collaborators with the Japanese colonial regime.

== History ==
The museum is the first to be fully privately funded in South Korea. The museum was established 11 years after it was first proposed, and cost ₩5.5 billion ($5,000,000). ₩1.5 billion was raised by the donations of over 4,800 private citizens. ₩103 million came from Japanese donors. Of the total cost, ₩3.3 billion was secured by the time of the museum's establishment, and the rest was owed to lenders. The museum was established in the Yongsan District of Seoul on August 29, 2018. By the time of the museum's establishment, they had digitized 60% of their collection.

The museum was created by the organization Center for Historical Truth and Justice (CHTJ), which was established in 1991. The organization has since put significant effort in documenting people or groups that collaborated with the Japanese in committing human rights abuses. Before it had a museum, the CHTJ made a number of temporary exhibitions. Despite being made hastily, the exhibitions received a highly positive reception, with some even being shown in Pyongyang, North Korea. Between 1995 and 2015, the CHTJ created over 30. In 2011, they announced their intent to create a permanent exhibition space.

However, the group's stance against collaborators put it at odds with the previous conservative governments in South Korea. Kang, Lee, and Kim noted that South Korean conservatives are generally considered to portray the Japanese colonial period in a more positive light. Park Chung Hee, a landmark conservative president in South Korean history, features prominently in the CHTJ's displays on collaborators with the Japanese.

== See also ==
- National Memorial Museum of Forced Mobilization under Japanese Occupation
- National Memorial of the Korean Provisional Government
- Independence Hall of Korea
- Seodaemun Prison
- Gyeonggyojang
