= Moscow Conference (1945) =

Allied Powers' meeting for post-war plans in Asia

- Host country: Soviet Union
- Date: December 16 – 26, 1945
- Cities: Moscow, Soviet Union
- Participants: (Soviet Union) Vyacheslav Molotov (United Kingdom) Ernest Bevin (United States) James F. Byrnes
- Follows: Potsdam Conference

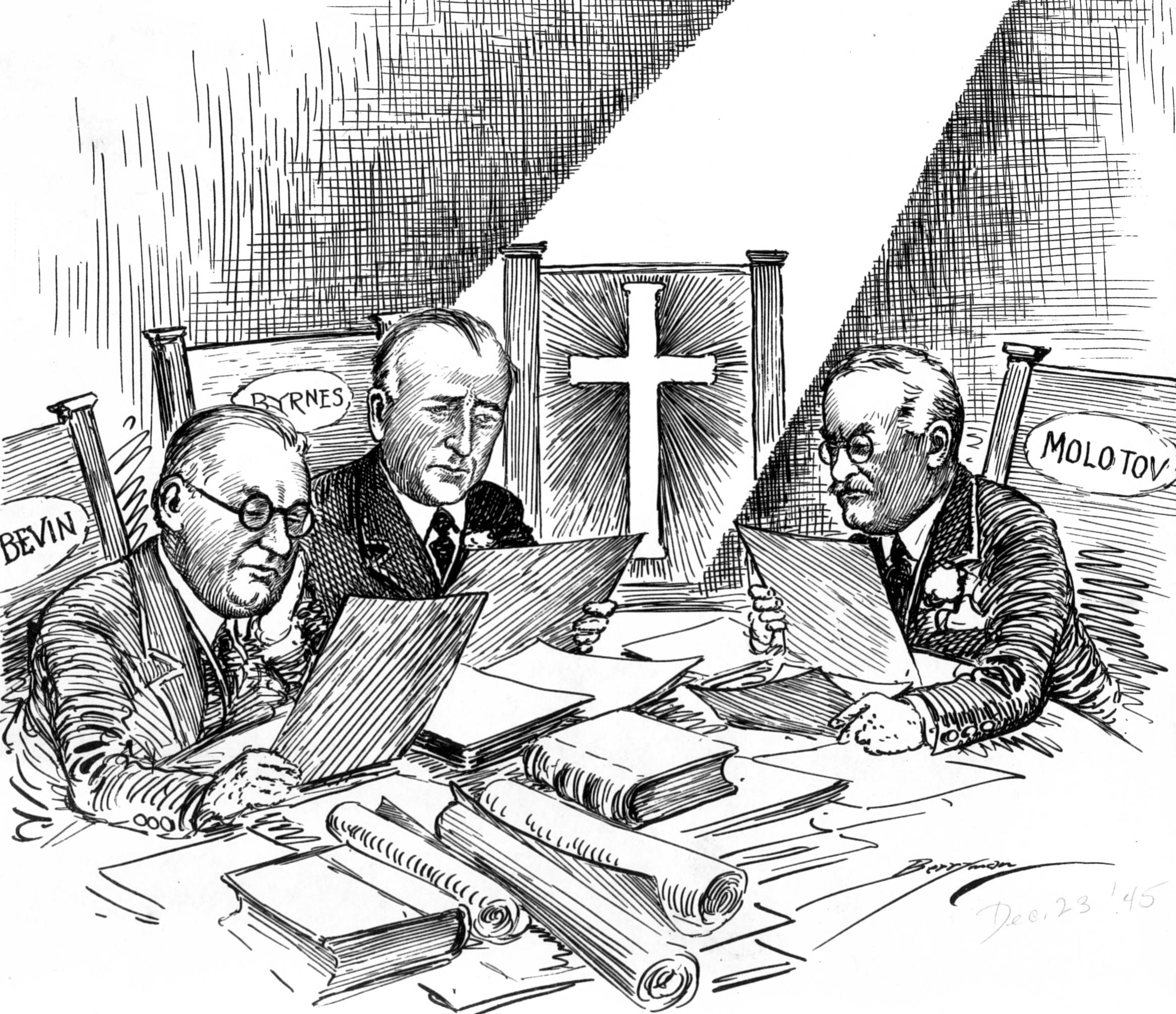
Cartoon by Clifford K. Berryman

The Moscow Conference of Foreign Ministers, also known as the Interim Meeting of Foreign Ministers, was held in Moscow between the foreign ministers of the United States, the United Kingdom, and the Soviet Union from December 16 to 26, 1945. They discussed the problems of occupation, establishing peace, and other Far Eastern issues.

James F. Byrnes represented the United States, Ernest Bevin the United Kingdom, and Vyacheslav Molotov the Soviet Union. They issued a communiqué after the conference on December 27, 1945.

The conference was one of a number of other Allied World War II conferences, including those at Cairo, Yalta and Potsdam.

== Articles ==
The result of the conference was the Soviet-Anglo-American Communiqué, which had the following articles:

1. Preparation of peace treaties with Italy, Romania, Bulgaria, Hungary and Finland.
2. Far Eastern Commission and Allied Council for Japan.
  - Far Eastern Commission
  - Allied Council for Japan
3. Korea
4. China
5. Romania
6. Bulgaria
7. The establishment by the United Nations of a commission for the control of atomic energy

== Aftermath ==
The Moscow Conference has been seen as advantageous for the Soviet Union. The conference was proposed by Byrnes, without an invitation offered to France or China and without first consulting with the United Kingdom. This was aligned with the goal the Soviet Union had previously wanted - that France and China would be excluded from peace settlements regarding the minor axis powers in Europe - and created a rift between the United Kingdom and United States. The conference also recognised the pro-Soviet governments in Romania and Bulgaria, granted the Soviet Union a role in post-war Japan, established international control of atomic energy, and achieved an agreement on a trusteeship in Korea - all were viewed as successes by the Soviet Union. Veteran American diplomat George F. Kennan, who was then serving in the US embassy in Moscow, observed the proceedings first hand, and wrote in his diary on US Secretary of State Byrnes: "The realities behind this agreement, since they concern only such people as Koreans, Rumanians, and Iranians, about whom he knows nothing, do not concern him. He wants an agreement for its political effect at home. The Russians know this. They will see that for this superficial success he pays a heavy price in the things that are real."

Writing in 1947, The Economist argued that the Moscow Conference "ended the phase of post-war in which the victors clung to the belief that they could work out agreed policies... Willy-nilly, world politics moves back towards the balance of power, and issues now tend to be determined by the relative strength or influence of the two groups."

=== Europe ===
The 1947 Paris Peace Treaties were the final peace settlement for Italy, Romania, Bulgaria, Hungary, and Finland.

=== Japan ===
The Moscow Conference established the Far Eastern Commission, based in Washington, D.C., which would oversee the Allied Council for Japan, replacing the Far Eastern Advisory Commission. The arrangement, which gave the United States a dominant position in Japan, was a mirror image to the situation in Hungary, Bulgaria, and Romania, where the Soviet Union was dominant. Both the far Eastern Commission and the Allied Council for Japan were dissolved following the Treaty of San Francisco in 1951.

=== Korea ===
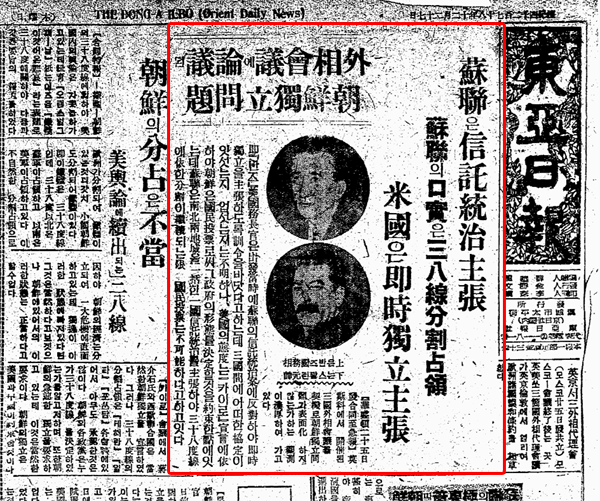
The December 27, 1945, issue of the Korean newspaper Dong-a Ilbo.

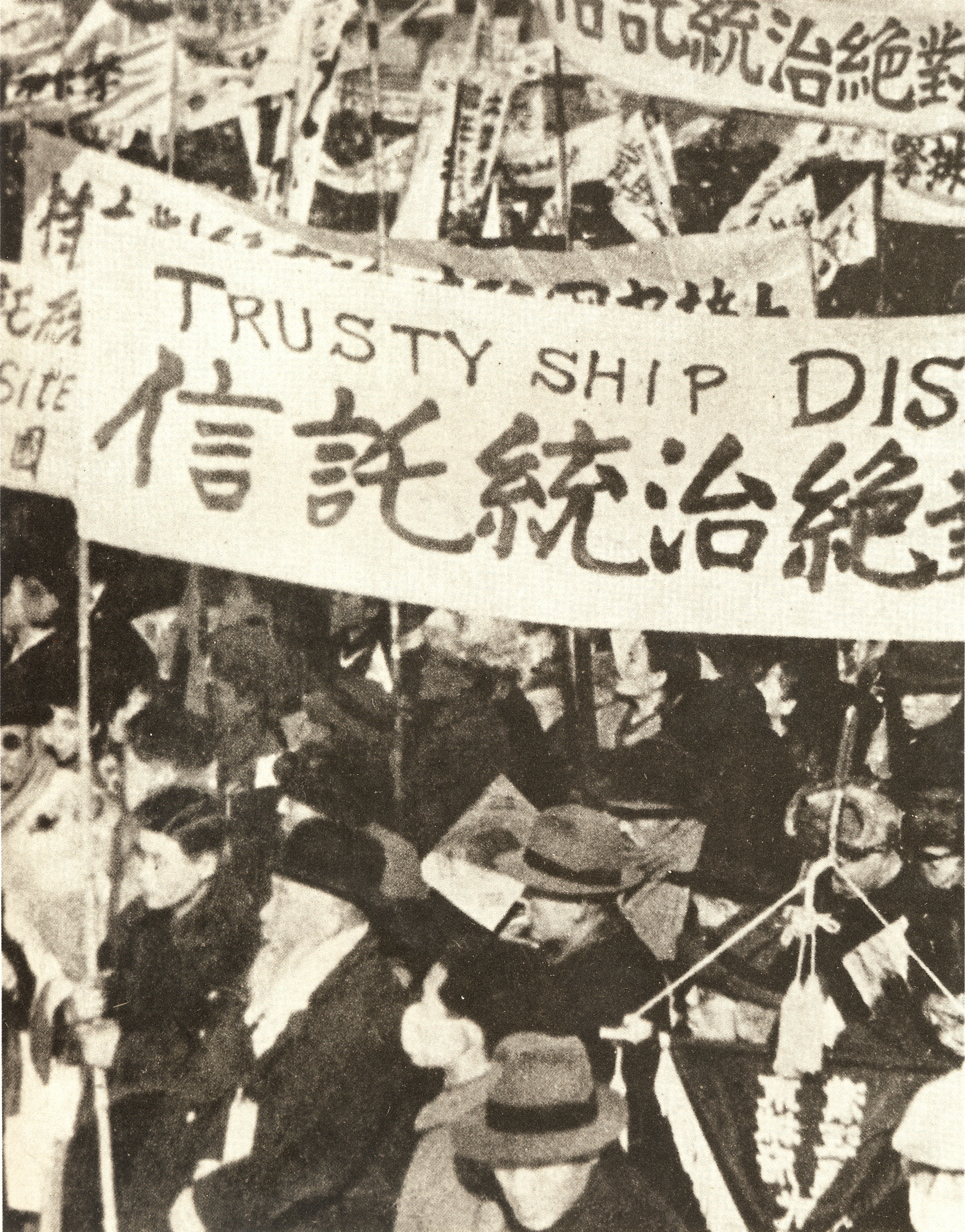
Anti-trusteeship rally, December 1945.

On December 25, 1945, prior to the announcement of the final decision of the conference, the United Press reported that "Secretary of State Byrnes went to Russia reportedly with instructions to urge immediate independence as opposed to the Russian thesis of trusteeship." Domestic media adopted the story on December 27. The communiqué was officially announced in Korea on December 28.

The section on Korea consisted of four paragraphs. The third paragraph called for the establishment of a Joint Commission, under the control of a consortium of the United States, Soviet Union, United Kingdom, and China, including the decision that a four-power trusteeship of up to five years would be needed before Korea attained independence. Both the political left and political right of Korea opposed this trusteeship plan, with it being suggested that such a plan made Korea a vassal of the four powers.

Protests against the trusteeship plan, which had also occurred on December 27, intensified on December 28. On the right, these protests were led by Kim Gu. On December 29, at Gyeonggyojang, a 76 member committee to oppose the trusteeship plan was formed, which included left wing leaders such as Pak Hon-yong of the Communist Party of Korea. Protests, leafletting, and discourse in the media continued the next few days. However, on January 3, 1946, the Communist Party reversed its position and issued a statement supporting the conference communiqué. This shift was not well received by the public. The shift coincides with the arrival of Soviet general Andrei Alekseevich Romanenko to Pyongyang on December 30, lending credence to the theory that the shift was due to a Soviet directive. The shift of the left away from the anti-trusteeship movement led to intensified confrontation between the left and right.

By January 23, unrest against the trusteeship plan had quietened somewhat, and right wing political groups stopped advocating for violence and for non-cooperation against military government. The Joint Commission convened throughout 1946 and 1947, but it was increasingly obstructed, mostly by the Soviet Union. The Soviet Union increased its military build-up in what would become North Korea and prevented the 1948 United Nations supervised election from occurring in the north. The failure of the Moscow Conference to peacefully settle the issue of Korea ultimately led to the Korean War in 1950.

The anti-trusteeship victory protests are celebrated in South Korea annually on December 28.

=== Atomic energy ===
The United Nations Atomic Energy Commission was founded on January 24, 1946, by the very first resolution of the United Nations General Assembly.

== Outstanding issues ==
The conference did not address outstanding issues regarding: Iran, Spain, Greece, Libya, and the Dardanelles. The Soviet Union was unwilling to withdraw from Iran, citing the Russo-Persian Treaty of Friendship and claiming their presence was legal to protect Baku. As a counter to Anglo-American demands for their withdrawal from Iran, the Soviet Union pressed for British withdrawal from Greece. Reiterating their position previously voiced at the Potsdam and London conferences, the Soviet Union once again made demands for a military base in the Dardanelles.

== See also ==
- Council of Foreign Ministers
- Moscow Conference (disambiguation)
- Potsdam Conference and the Potsdam Agreement of which the first article was the "establishment of a Council of Foreign Ministers to do the necessary preparatory work for the peace settlements"
