= Moscow Conference =

Five Moscow conferences took place during and just after World War II among representatives of the United Kingdom, the United States, and the Soviet Union:

- Moscow Conference (1941), from September 29, 1941, to October 1, 1941
- Moscow Conference (1942), from August 12, 1942, to August 17, 1942
- Moscow Conference (1943), from October 18, 1943, to November 11, 1943
- Moscow Conference (1944), on October 9, 1944
- Moscow Conference (1945) (also known as the Interim Meeting of Foreign Ministers) between December 16 and December 26, 1945
