= National Memorial Museum of Forced Mobilization under Japanese Occupation =

History museum in Busan, South Korea

- Museum exterior (2018)
- Established: December 10, 2015
- Location: 48532, 100, Honggok-ro, 320beon-gil, Nam District, Busan, South Korea
- Coordinates: 35.124972°N 129.092333°E
- Type: National history museum
- Director: Park Cheolgyu
- Public transit access: Daeyeon station, then bus
- Website: www.fomo.or.kr/museum/eng/Main.do (in English)

Korean name
- Hangul: 국립일제강제동원역사관
- Hanja: 國立日帝強制動員歷史館
- RR: Gungnip ilje gangje dongwon yeoksagwan
- MR: Kungnip ilche kangje tongwŏn yŏksagwan

The National Memorial Museum of Forced Mobilization under Japanese Occupation (Korean: 국립일제강제동원역사관) is a national history museum in Busan, South Korea. It first opened on December 10, 2015.

It covers the Japanese colonial period (1910–1945), in particular when Koreans were forced to perform labor and moved to other places to support Japan. The museum was founded by the South Korean Ministry of the Interior and Safety, although jurisdiction was transferred to the Ministry of Government Administration and Home Affairs in 2016.

As of 2023, admission into the museum is free of charge. Its director is Park Cheolgyu.

== History ==
In 2017, Jikai Taketomi, a Japanese man who runs a private war archive in Japan, donated 30 items from his collection to the museum, and offered his apologies for Japan's role in World War II.

In 2018, a bronze statue that had been illegally erected in protest in front of the Japanese Consulate General in Busan was moved to the museum, despite pushback from the protestors who installed it.

In October 2019, former Japanese Prime Minister Yukio Hatoyama visited the museum. Hatoyama said after the visit:

I hope that Japanese people visit this place, and humbly face the historic truth... I deeply apologize for the fact that 8 million of about 20 million Joseon (Korean) people at the time were forcefully mobilized as military personnel, civilians attached to the military, and forced laborers, and many lost lives... Japanese people should learn many things from history like this, and should open up the future with a sense of responsibility as perpetrators.

== See also ==
- Museum of Japanese Colonial History in Korea
