= Provisional Government of the Republic of Korea Memorial Hall, Hangzhou =

Korean history museum in Hangzhou, China

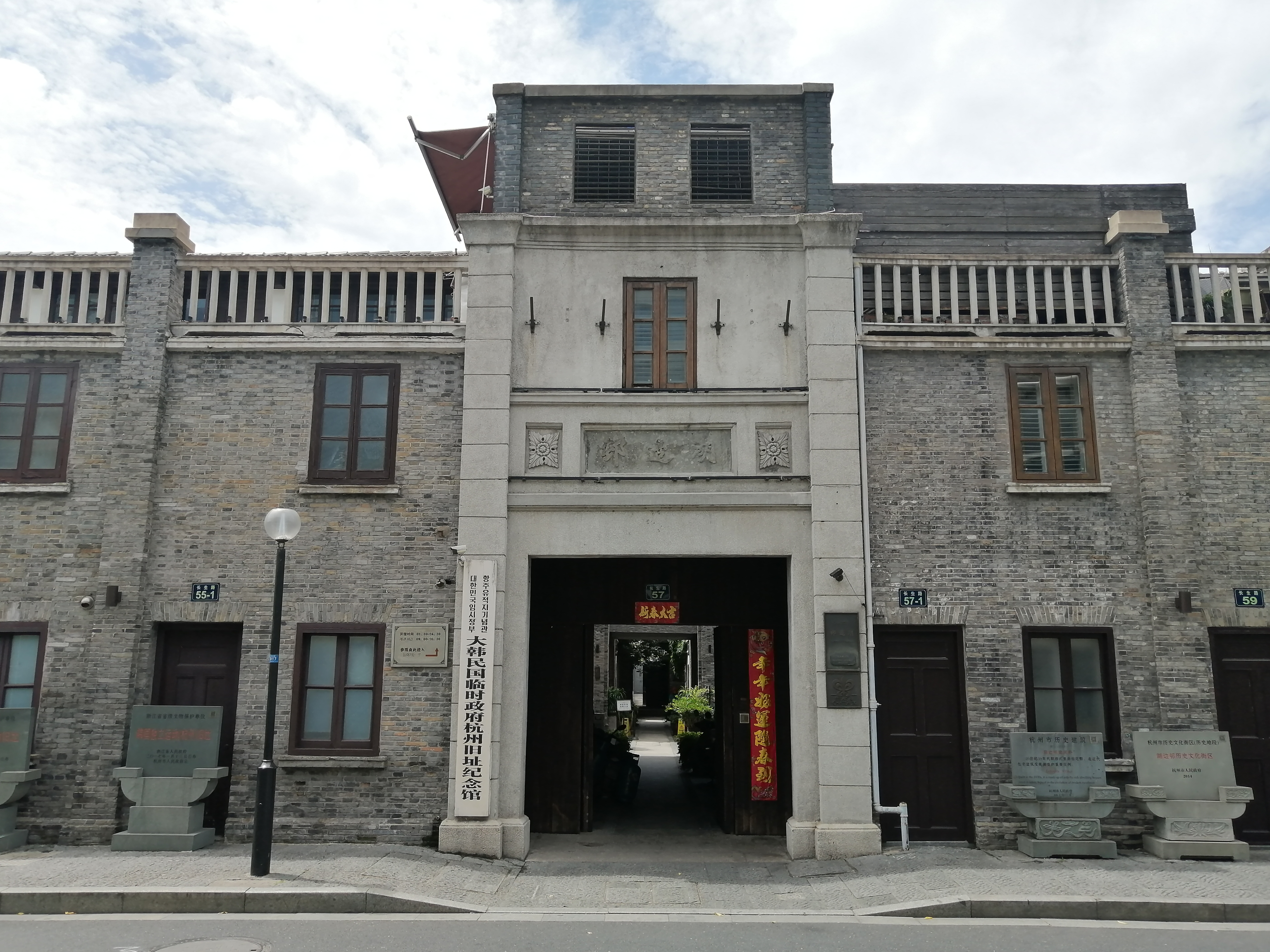
- Established: November 30, 2007
- Location: Hangzhou, China
- Coordinates: 30.2567°N 120.1611°E

The Provisional Government of the Republic of Korea Memorial Hall (Korean: 대한민국 임시정부 항저우 구지 기념관; Chinese: 大韩民国临时政府杭州旧址纪念馆) is a museum and former temporary headquarters of the Provisional Government of the Republic of Korea located in Hangzhou, China. It was used by that government from May 1932 to November 1935.

In August 2002, the Hangzhou city government purchased the land surrounding the memorial hall. In April 2005, it began restoring the building and converting it into a museum. These efforts were done in collaboration with the Independence Hall of Korea. The museum was opened on November 30, 2007.
