= Provisional Government of the Republic of Korea Memorial Hall, Shanghai =

History museum in Shanghai, China

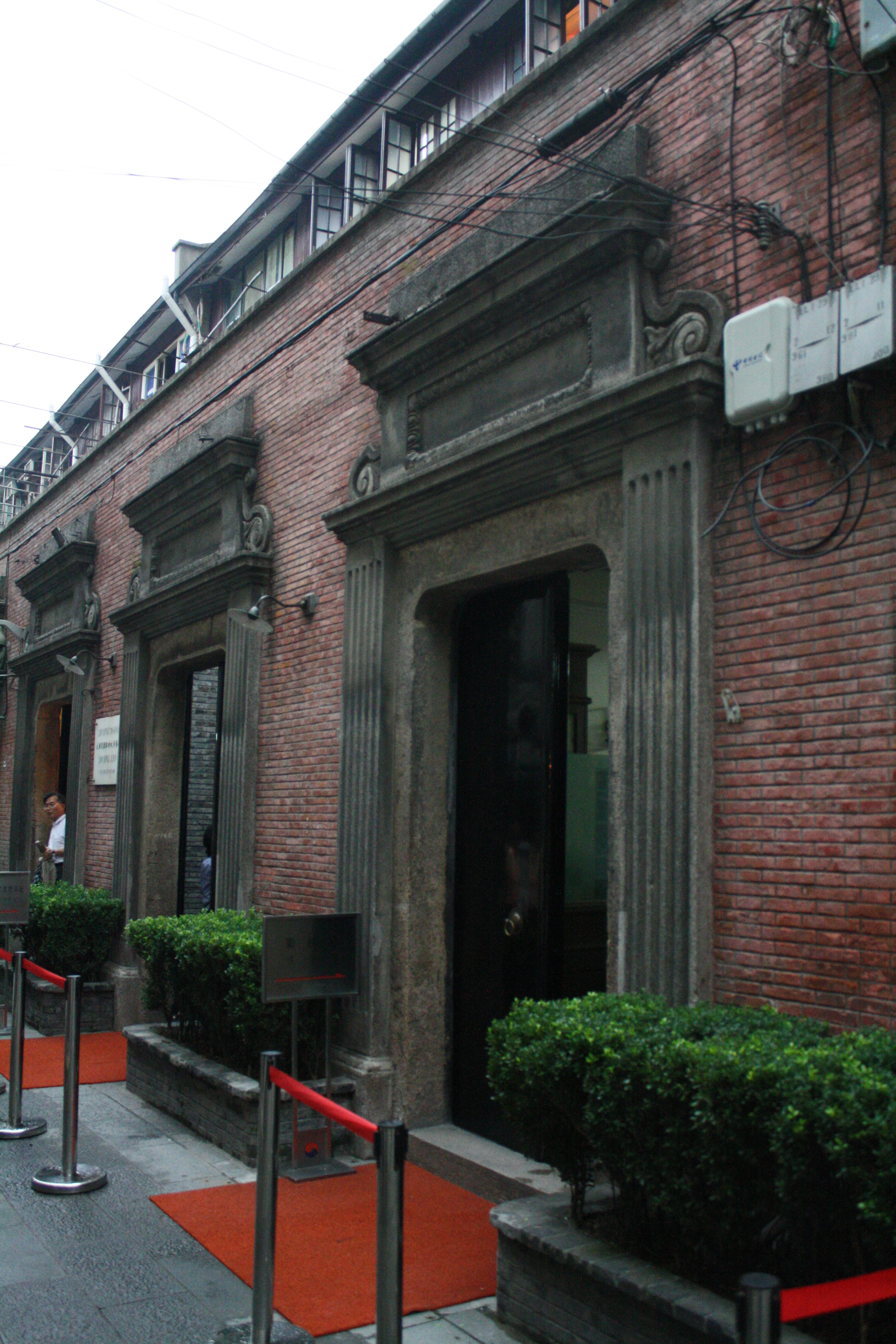
- Entrance (2010)
- Established: 1993 (as museum)
- Coordinates: 31.2172°N 121.4746°E

The Provisional Government of the Republic of Korea Memorial Hall (Korean: 대한민국 임시정부 유적지; Chinese: 大韩民国临时政府旧址) is a museum on the Provisional Government of the Republic of Korea located in Shanghai, China. This building was one of several headquarters of that government in Shanghai. They used this one from 1926 to 1932.

== Description ==
The Provisional Government of the Republic of Korea (Korean Provisional Government; KPG) was a government-in-exile established by Koreans during the 1910–1945 Japanese colonial period. It first settled in the French Concession area in Shanghai on April 10, 1919, but it moved locations several times to escape Japanese authorities and to cope with tight finances. They used this building from July 1926 to 1932.

In the late 1980s, South Koreans engaged in efforts to locate the various headquarters and historic sites of the KPG in China. They confirmed this as one of the buildings used by the KPG. It was originally built in 1925. Afterwards, the building was declared a cultural relic and designated for protection because of its significance to China and South Korea. Beginning in 1990, the local government, the Independence Hall of Korea, and Samsung C&T worked to restore the building and convert it into a museum. The building opened to the public on April 13, 1993. It was renovated and reopened in 2001.

The museum has three floors, with various recreations of the facilities of KPG members. It has exhibits and explanations about the history of the KPG. It received more than 3 million Korean tourists from 1993 to 2015.
