= Lequn Society building =

Historic building in Liuzhou, China

Coordinates: 24.3019°N 109.4046°E

- 乐群社旧址
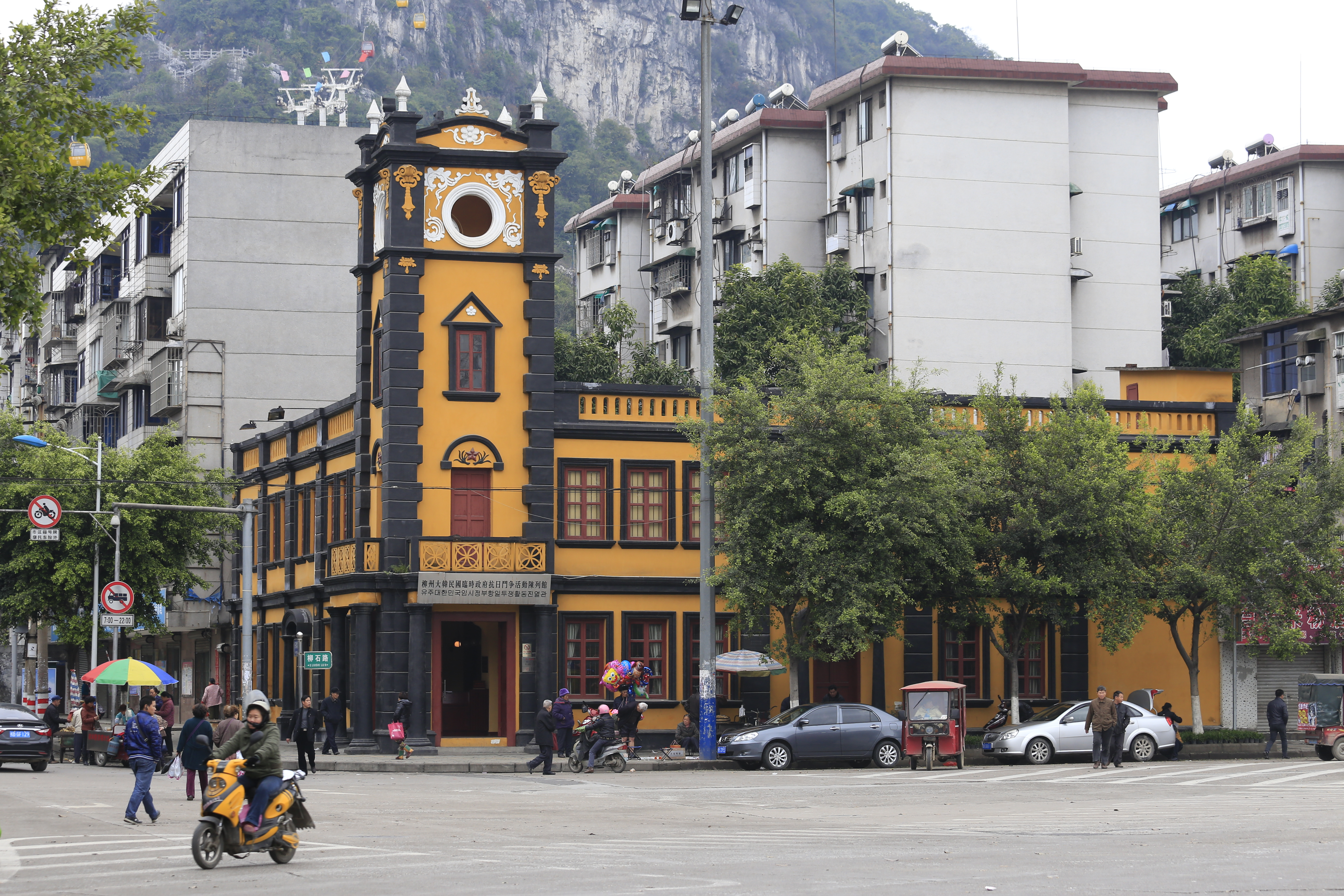
- The building (2014)

General information
- Location: Liuzhou, China

The Lequn Society former building (Chinese: 乐群社旧址) is a historic building located in Liuzhou, China. It was once used as the residence of Vietnamese revolutionary Ho Chi Minh and is a protected cultural property of the city.

The building currently houses the Provisional Government of the Republic of Korea Memorial Hall (Korean: 유주대한민국임시정부항일투쟁활동진열관; Chinese: 柳州大韩民国临时政府抗日斗争活动陈列馆), a museum on the Provisional Government of the Republic of Korea. That government was based in this building from November 1938 to April 1939. It was turned into a museum on that government in 2004.

== See also ==
- Provisional Government of the Republic of Korea Memorial Hall – other memorial halls to the provisional government

== Gallery ==
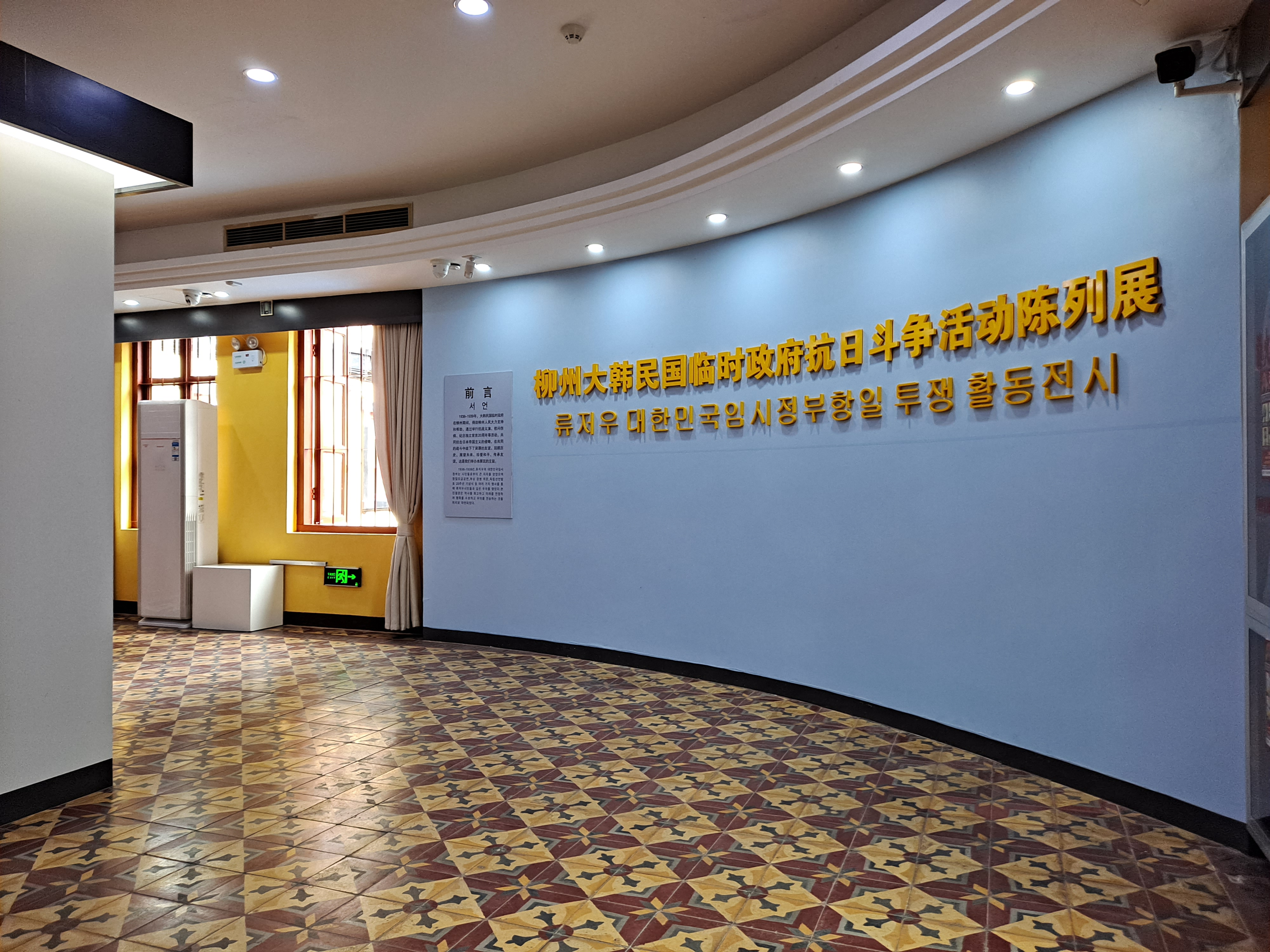
Building and museum interior (2022)

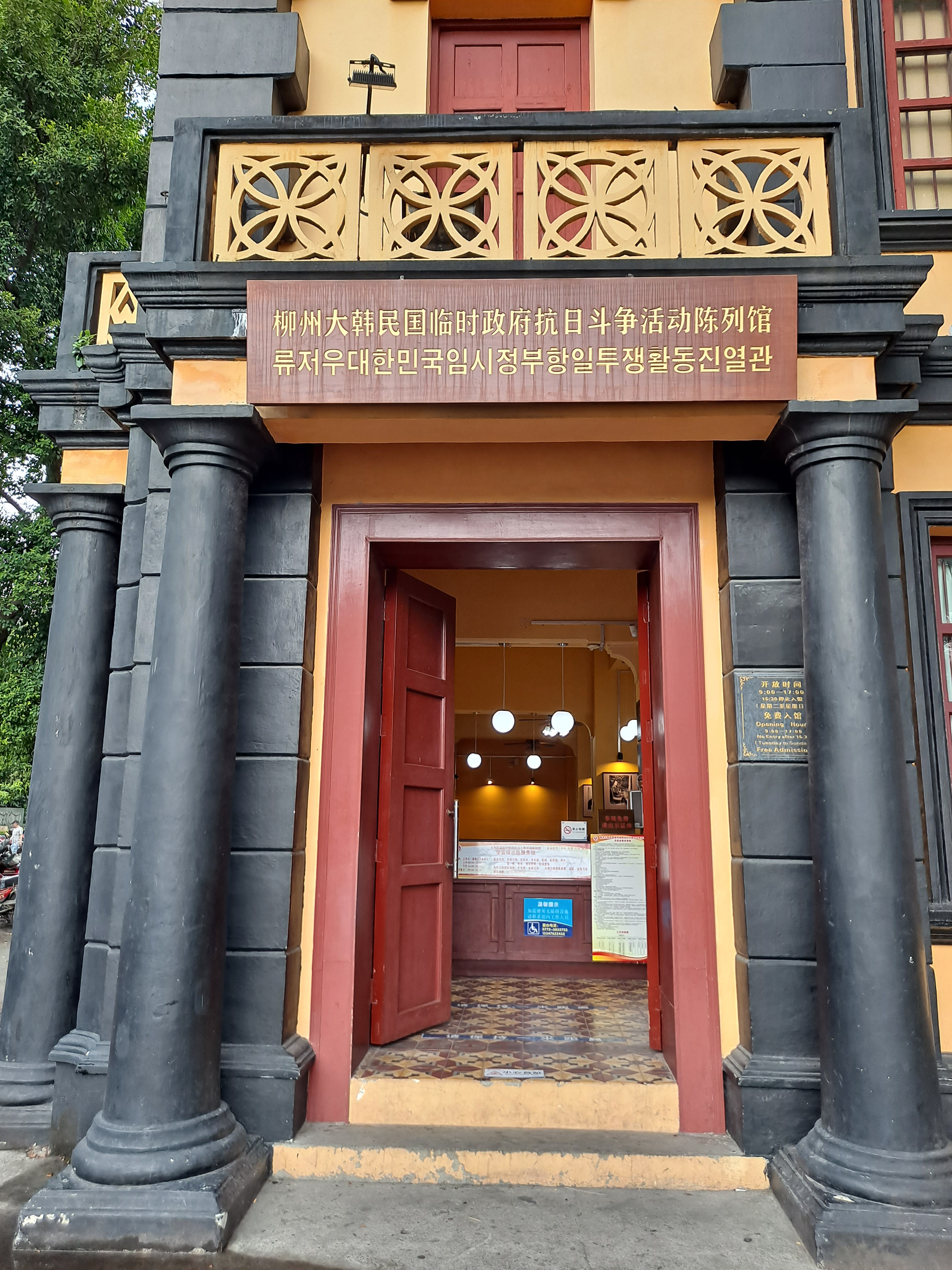
Building and museum entrance (2022)
