= Lim Heon-yong =

South Korean politician (born 1941)

- Hangul: 임헌영
- Hanja: 任軒永
- RR: Im Heonyeong
- MR: Im Hŏnyŏng

Alternate name
- Hangul: 임준렬
- Hanja: 任俊烈
- RR: Im Junryeol
- MR: Im Chullyŏl

Lim Heon-yong (Korean: 임헌영; born January 15, 1941) is a South Korean author, journalist, critic, educator. His birth name is Lim Joon-nyul (임준렬).

== Life ==
He was born in 1941 in Uiseong, North Gyeongsang Province, Korea, Empire of Japan. His father, Lim woo-bin, was killed by the government of South Korea in 1950. In 1965, he graduated from Chung-Ang University and in 1968 he received a master's of literature. From 1965 to 1972, he was a journalist for Pharmaceuticals News, Kyunghyangsinmun. He was an instructor at Chung-Ang University. From March 1996 to August 1998, he was Chung-Ang University Graduate School of Art's Visiting Professor and in 1998 Chung-Ang University Korean Languages Studies Professor.

== See also ==
- Center for Historical Truth and Justice
