= Potsdam Agreement =

1945 agreement between the major 3 Allies regarding the end of World War II

The "Big Three": Clement Attlee, Harry S. Truman, and Joseph Stalin

The Potsdam Agreement (German: Potsdamer Abkommen) was the agreement among three of the Allies of World War II: the United Kingdom, the United States, and the Soviet Union after the end of World War II in Europe that was signed on 1 August 1945 and published the following day. A product of the Potsdam Conference, it concerned the military occupation and reconstruction of Germany, its border, and the entire European Theatre of War territory. It also addressed Germany's demilitarisation, reparations, the prosecution of war criminals and the mass expulsion of ethnic Germans from various parts of Europe. France was not invited to the conference but formally remained one of the powers occupying Germany.

Executed as a communiqué, the agreement was not a peace treaty according to international law, although it created accomplished facts. It was superseded by the Treaty on the Final Settlement with Respect to Germany signed on 12 September 1990.

As De Gaulle had not been invited to the Conference, the French resisted implementing the Potsdam Agreement within their occupation zone. In particular, the French refused to resettle any expelled Germans from the east. Moreover, the French did not accept any obligation to abide by the Potsdam Agreement in the proceedings of the Allied Control Council; in particular resisting all proposals to establish common policies and institutions across Germany as a whole (for example, France separated Saarland from Germany to establish its protectorate on 17 December 1947), and anything that they feared might lead to the emergence of an eventual unified German government.

== Overview ==
After the end of World War II in Europe (1939–1945), and the decisions of the earlier Tehran, Casablanca and Yalta Conferences, the Allies assumed supreme authority over Germany by the Berlin Declaration of June 5, 1945.

At the Potsdam Conference the Western Allies were presented with Stalin's fait accompli awarding Soviet-occupied Poland the river Oder as its western border, placing the entire Soviet Occupation Zone east of it (with the exception of the Kaliningrad exclave), including Pomerania, most of East Prussia, and Danzig, under Polish administration. The German population who had not fled were expelled and their properties acquisitioned by the state.

The Three Power Conference took place from 17 July to 2 August 1945, in which they adopted the Protocol of the Proceedings, August 1, 1945, signed at Cecilienhof Palace in Potsdam. The signatories were General Secretary Joseph Stalin, President Harry S. Truman, and Prime Minister Clement Attlee, who, as a result of the British general election of 1945, had replaced Winston Churchill as the UK's representative. The three powers also agreed to invite France and China to participate as members of the Council of Foreign Ministers established to oversee the agreement. The Provisional Government of the French Republic accepted the invitation on August 7, with the key reservation that it would not accept a priori any commitment to the eventual reconstitution of a central government in Germany.

James F. Byrnes wrote "we specifically refrained from promising to support at the German Peace Conference any particular line as the western frontier of Poland". The Berlin Protocol declared: "The three heads of government reaffirm their opinion that the final delimitation of the western frontier of Poland should await the [final] peace settlement." Byrnes continues: "In the light of this history, it is difficult to credit with good faith any person who asserts that Poland's western boundary was fixed by the conferences, or that there was a promise that it would be established at some particular place." Despite this, the Oder–Neisse Line was set as Poland's provisional (and therefore theoretically subject to change) western frontier in Article 8 of the Agreement but was not finalized as Poland's permanent western frontier until the 1990 German–Polish Border Treaty, having been recognized by East Germany in 1950 (in the Treaty of Zgorzelec) and acquiesced to by West Germany in 1970 (in the Treaty of Moscow (1970) and the Treaty of Warsaw (1970)).

== Protocol ==
In the Potsdam Agreement (Berlin Conference) the Allies (UK, USSR, US) agreed on the following matters:

1. Establishment of a Council of Foreign Ministers, also including France and China; tasked the preparation of a peace settlement for Germany, to be accepted by the Government of Germany once a government adequate for the purpose had been established.
  See the London Conference of Foreign Ministers and the Moscow Conference which took place later in 1945.
2. The principles to govern the treatment of Germany in the initial control period.
  See European Advisory Commission and Allied Control Council.
  - A. Political principles.
  Post-war Germany to be divided into four Occupation Zones under the control of the United Kingdom, the Soviet Union, the United States and France; with the Commanders-in-chief of each country's forces exercising sovereign authority over matters within their own zones, while exercising authority jointly through the Allied Control Council for 'Germany as a whole'.
  Democratization. Treatment of Germany as a single unit. Disarmament and Demilitarization. Elimination of all Nazi influence.
  - B. Economic principles.
  Reduction or destruction of all civilian heavy industry with war potential, such as shipbuilding, machine production and chemical factories. Restructuring of German economy towards agriculture and light industry.
3. Reparations from Germany.
  This section covered reparation claims of the USSR from the Soviet occupation zone in Germany. The section also agreed that 10% of the industrial capacity of the western zones unnecessary for the German peace economy should be transferred to the Soviet Union within two years. The Soviet Union withdrew its previous objections to French membership of the Allied Reparations Commission, which had been established in Moscow following the Yalta Conference.
4. Disposal of the German Navy and merchant marine.
  All but thirty submarines to be sunk and the rest of the German Navy was to be divided equally between the three powers.
  The German merchant marine was to be divided equally between the three powers, and they would distribute some of those ships to the other Allies. But until the end of the war with the Empire of Japan all the ships would remain under the authority of the Combined Shipping Adjustment Board and the United Maritime Authority.
5. City of Königsberg and the adjacent area (then East Prussia, now Kaliningrad Oblast).
  The United States and the United Kingdom declared that they would support the transfer of Königsberg and the adjacent area to the Soviet Union at the peace conference.
6. War criminals
  This was a short paragraph and covered the creation of the London Charter and the subsequent Nuremberg trials:
  The Three Governments have taken note of the discussions which have been proceeding in recent weeks in London between British, United States, Soviet and French representatives with a view to reaching agreement on the methods of trial of those major war criminals whose crimes under the Moscow Declaration of October 1943 have no particular geographical localization. The Three Governments reaffirm their intention to bring these criminals to swift and sure justice. They hope that the negotiations in London will result in speedy agreement being reached for this purpose, and they regard it as a matter of great importance that the trial of these major criminals should begin at the earliest possible date. The first list of defendants will be published before 1st September.
7. Austria:
  The government of Austria was to be decided after British and American forces entered Vienna, and that Austria should not pay any reparations.
8. Poland
  There should be a Provisional Government of National Unity recognised by all three powers, and that those Poles who were serving in British Army formations should be free to return to Poland. The provisional western border should be the Oder–Neisse line, with territories to the east of this excluded from the Soviet Occupation zone and placed under Polish and Soviet civil administration. Poland would receive former German territories in the north and west, but the final delimitation of the western frontier of Poland should await the peace settlement; which eventually took place as the Treaty on the Final Settlement with Respect to Germany in 1990.
9. Conclusion on peace treaties and admission to the United Nations organization.
  See Moscow Conference of Foreign Ministers which took place later in 1945.
  It was noted that Italy had fought on the side of the Allies and was making good progress towards establishment of a democratic government and institutions and that after the peace treaty the three Allies would support an application from a democratic Italian government for membership of the United Nations. Further,
  [t]he three Governments have also charged the Council of Foreign Ministers with the task of preparing peace treaties for Bulgaria, Finland, Hungary and Romania. The conclusion of Peace Treaties with recognized democratic governments in these States will also enable the three Governments to support applications from them for membership of the United Nations. The three Governments agree to examine each separately in the near future in the light of the conditions then prevailing, the establishment of diplomatic relations with Finland, Romania, Bulgaria, and Hungary to the extent possible prior to the conclusion of peace treaties with those countries.
  The details were discussed later that year at the Moscow Conference of Foreign Ministers and the treaties were signed in 1947 at the Paris Peace Conference.
  By that time the governments of Romania, Bulgaria, and Hungary were Communist.
10. Territorial Trusteeship
  Italian former colonies would be decided in connection with the preparation of a peace treaty for Italy. Like most of the other former European Axis powers the Italian peace treaty was signed at the 1947 Paris Peace Conference.
11. Revised Allied Control Commission procedure in Romania, Bulgaria, and Hungary
  Now that hostilities in Europe were at an end the Western Allies should have a greater input into the Control Commissions of Central and Eastern Europe, the Annex to this agreement included detailed changes to the workings of the Hungarian Control Commission.
12. Orderly transfer of German Populations
  The Three Governments, having considered the question in all its aspects, recognize that the transfer to Germany of German populations, or elements thereof, remaining in Poland, Czechoslovakia and Hungary, will have to be undertaken. They agree that any transfers that take place should be effected in an orderly and humane manner.
  "German populations, or elements thereof, remaining in Poland" refers to Germans living within the 1937 boundaries of Poland up to the Curzon Line going East. In theory, that German ethnic population could have been expelled to the Polish temporarily administered territories of Silesia, Farther Pomerania, East Prussia and eastern Brandenburg.
  Because Allied-occupied Germany was under great strain, the Czechoslovak government, the Polish provisional government and the control council in Hungary were asked to submit an estimate of the time and rate at which further transfers could be carried out having regard to the present situation in Germany and suspend further expulsions until these estimates were integrated into plans for an equitable distribution of these "removed" Germans among the several zones of occupation.
13. Oil equipment in Romania
14. Iran
  Allied troops were to withdraw immediately from Tehran and that further stages of the withdrawal of troops from Iran should be considered at the meeting of the Council of Foreign Ministers to be held in London in September 1945.
15. The international zone of Tangier.
  The city of Tangier and the area around it should remain international and discussed further.
16. The Black Sea straits
  The Montreux Convention should be revised and that this should be discussed with the Turkish government.
17. International inland waterways
18. European inland transport conference
19. Directives to the military commanders on allied control council for Germany
20. Use of Allied property for satellite reparations or war trophies
  These were detailed in Annex II.
21. Military Talks
- Annex I
- Annex II

Moreover, towards concluding the Pacific Theatre of War, the Potsdam Conference issued the Potsdam Declaration, the Proclamation Defining Terms for Japanese Surrender (26 July 1945) wherein the Western Allies (UK, US, USSR) and the Nationalist China of General Chiang Kai-shek asked Japan to surrender or be destroyed.

== Aftermath ==
Already during the Potsdam Conference, on 30 July 1945, the Allied Control Council was constituted in Berlin to execute the Allied resolutions (the "Four Ds"):

- Denazification of the German society to eradicate Nazi influence
- Demilitarization of the former Wehrmacht forces and the German arms industry; however, the circumstances of the Cold War soon led to Germany's Wiederbewaffnung including the re-establishment of both the Bundeswehr and the National People's Army
- Democratization, including the formation of political parties and trade unions, freedom of speech, of the press and religion
- Decentralization resulting in the re-establishment of German federalism, along with disassemblement as part of the industrial plans for Germany. Dismantling was stopped in West Germany in 1951 according to the Truman Doctrine, whereafter East Germany had to cope with the impact alone.

=== Territorial changes ===
The northern half of the German province of East Prussia, occupied by the Red Army during its East Prussian Offensive followed by its evacuation in winter 1945, had already been incorporated into Soviet territory as the Kaliningrad Oblast. The Western Allies promised to support the annexation of the territory north of the Braunsberg–Goldap line when a Final German Peace Treaty was held.

The Allies had acknowledged the legitimacy of the Polish Provisional Government of National Unity, which was about to form a Soviet satellite state. Urged by Stalin, the UK and the US gave in to put the German territories east of the Oder–Neisse line from the Baltic coast west of Świnoujście up to the Czechoslovak border "under Polish administration"; allegedly confusing the Lusatian Neisse and the Glatzer Neisse rivers. The proposal of an Oder–Bober–Queis line was rejected by the Soviet delegation. The cession included the former Free City of Danzig and the seaport of Stettin on the mouth of the Oder River (Szczecin Lagoon), vital for the Upper Silesian Industrial Region.

Post-war, 'Germany as a whole' would consist solely of aggregate territories of the respective zones of occupation. As all former German territories east of the Oder–Neisse line were excluded from the Soviet Occupation Zone, they were consequently excluded from 'Germany as a whole'.

=== Expulsions ===
In the course of the proceedings, and after the German state killed around 5-6 million Polish citizens during the war, Polish communists had begun to suppress the German population west of the Bóbr river to underline their demand for a border on the Lusatian Neisse. The Allied resolution on the "orderly transfer" of German population became the legitimation of the expulsion of Germans from the nebulous parts of Central Europe, if they had not already fled from the advancing Red Army.

The expulsion of ethnic Germans by the Poles concerned, in addition to Germans within areas behind the 1937 Polish border in the West (such as in most of the old Prussian province of West Prussia), the territories placed "under Polish administration" pending a Final German Peace Treaty, i.e. southern East Prussia (Masuria), Farther Pomerania, the New March region of the former Province of Brandenburg, the districts of the Grenzmark Posen-West Prussia, Lower Silesia and those parts of Upper Silesia that had remained with Germany after the 1921 Upper Silesia plebiscite. It further affected the German minority living within the territory of the former Second Polish Republic in Greater Poland, eastern Upper Silesia, Chełmno Land and the Polish Corridor with Danzig.

The Germans in Czechoslovakia (34% of the population of the territory of what is now the Czech Republic), known as Sudeten Germans but also Carpathian Germans, were expelled from the Sudetenland region where they formed a majority, from linguistic enclaves in central Bohemia and Moravia, as well as from the city of Prague.

Though the Potsdam Agreement referred only to Poland, Czechoslovakia and Hungary, expulsions also occurred in Romania, where the Transylvanian Saxons were deported and their property seized, and in Yugoslavia. In the Soviet territories, Germans were expelled from northern East Prussia (Oblast Kaliningrad) but also from the adjacent Lithuanian Klaipėda Region and other lands settled by Baltic Germans.

== See also ==
- Territorial changes of Poland immediately after World War II
- History of Germany (1945–1990)
- Oder–Neisse line
