= Kwak Nagwŏn =

Korean independence activist (1859–1939)

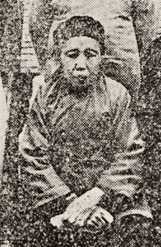
- Kwak in 1934, around age 75
- Born: 26 February 1859; Changyon County, Hwanghae Province, Joseon
- Died: 29 April 1939 (aged 80); Chongqing, Republic of China
- Burial place: Daejeon National Cemetery
- Known for: Korean independence activist and mother of Kim Ku
- Spouse: Kim Sun-yŏng
- Children: 1 (Kim Ku)
- Awards: Order of Merit for National Foundation

Korean name
- Hangul: 곽낙원
- Hanja: 郭樂園
- RR: Gwak Nakwon
- MR: Kwak Nagwŏn

Kwak Nagwŏn (Korean: 곽낙원; 26 February 1859 – 26 April 1939) was a Korean independence activist and the mother of Kim Ku. She joined her son in exile in the Republic of China and assisted him and her grandchildren in their resistance against the Empire of Japan. She, along with her son, are revered in South Korea, where she is seen as a paragon of Korean motherhood.

Kwak was born into a poorly-educated farming family in the last few decades of the Joseon kingdom. She gave birth to Kim Ku at age seventeen. She joined her son in exile in China between 1922 and 1925, as well as between 1934 and 1939. Her second period in exile overlapped with the Second Sino–Japanese War, and she followed her son and the Kuomintang as they escaped from the Japanese across China.

They eventually settled in Chongqing, but she took sick with pharyngitis on the journey and died at the age of 80, six years before the liberation of Korea. In 1992, she was posthumously awarded the Order of Merit for National Foundation from the South Korean government. She is now buried in the Daejeon National Cemetery.

She had a significant impact on her son and was reputed to be tenacious and fiercely devoted to the independence movement.

== Biography ==
Kwak was born on 26 February 1859, in Changyon County, Hwanghae Province, Joseon. Her bongwan is the Hyeonpung Gwak clan. She was married to Kim Sunyŏng. At age seventeen, she had her only child, Kim Ch'angam, who would later be known by his art name Kim Ku.

She came from a lower class and poorly educated farming family that experienced discrimination from the local elite. She was determined to ensure her son would avoid a similar fate, and enrolled him in a local seodang to learn to read and write and prepare for the gwageo civil service examinations.

In 1888, her husband suffered a stroke that left him paralyzed. Desperate to cure him, she sold off all of the family's belongings, including silverware, and left Kim Ku at a relative's house while she took her husband around the province in search of a doctor.

After the 1896 Chihapo incident, in which Kim Ku murdered a Japanese man, Kim was eventually imprisoned in an Incheon prison. Kwak went with her son and worked as a housemaid in Incheon, providing occasion care for him in the form of meals and news from the outside world. After Kim's escape and marriage in 1904, she reportedly made a point of consistently siding with her daughter-in-law whenever the couple argued.

She also provided care for him at Seodaemun Prison after his 1911 arrest due to his activities in the New People's Association.

In 1922, she left Korea to join her son in exile in Shanghai, and supported him while he worked at the Korean Provisional Government (KPG). The KPG consistently struggled with its finances throughout its history, and its members similarly struggled. Kwak and her family were no exception; after the unexpected early death of her daughter-in-law in January 1924, Kwak could not afford to properly care for her grandson Kim Shin, and so she temporarily placed him in an orphanage. She was hardly able to afford two meals per day, and for one birthday she received just two strips of phoenix oolong for tea. She and her two grandchildren returned to Korea in December 1925. There, she saved money and sent it over to Kim and the KPG.

In March 1934, she snuck past Japanese authorities and returned to China with her grandchildren. Their second stay in China was no less difficult; the KPG had been on the run from Japanese authorities and moved from city to city around this time. And after the Second Sino-Japanese War broke out in 1937, their retreat intensified, as they followed the Kuomintang across China, eventually ending up in Chongqing. In 1938, during this retreat, an ethnic Korean attempted to assassinate Kim in Changsha, in what became known as the Nammokcheong incident. Kim was on the verge of death, but eventually recovered. Upon his recovery, Kwak said she was confident that he would survive, and that the only pity was that the assassin was Korean.

For her 80th birthday (Korean age reckoning), she famously demanded that they spend money not on presents for her, but on pistols for Korean revolutionary fighters. Her son carried out her request and bought two pistols as well as fifty fountain pens to distribute amongst the independence movement to facilitate communication.

== Death and legacy ==
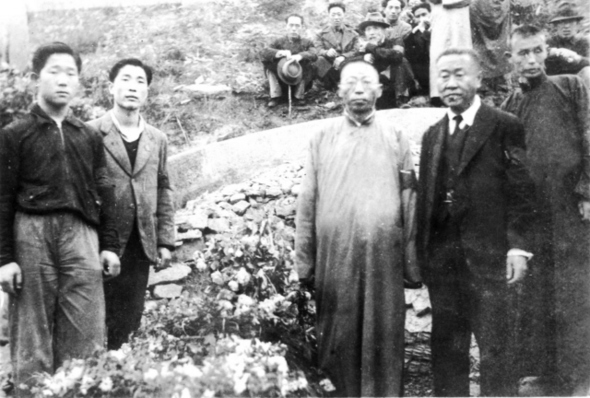
Kwak's funeral. From the left is her youngest grandson Shin, eldest grandson In, son Kim Ku, and Kim Hong-seo (26 April 1939)

She died on 26 April 1936 at age 80 (Note: 82 by Korean reckoning) in Chongqing, Republic of China from pharyngitis. She died before ever seeing an independent Korea, which was liberated in 1945.

Kim Ku consistently wrote extremely positively about her in his autobiography, the Diary of Kim Ku, even calling her the "mother of the nation" on several occasions. (Note: Korean: 국모; Hanja: 國母)

In 1992, she was posthumously awarded the Order of Merit for National Foundation award from the South Korean government. In 1999, she was reinterred at grave site No. 771 at the 2nd patriot branch of the Daejeon National Cemetery.

=== Statue in Incheon Grand Park ===
In 1948, a bronze statue of Kwak was created by a professor at Seoul National University. The statue depicts Kwak wearing a hanbok and with a bowl in hand, preparing food for Kim during one or perhaps symbolically both of his stays at an Incheon prison. The statue was first placed in the Kim Gu Museum & Library at Hyochang Park in Seoul, but it was relocated to Incheon Grand Park in the late 1990s. As of 2015, the statue stood at the park, ten meters away from a statue of her son. However, the existence of the statues are relatively unknown, which prompted proposals to move the statue to a more trafficked location in Wolmi Park in 2015.

== Personal life ==
She was married to Kim Sun-yŏng until his death in 1901.

She was reportedly shorter than 150 cm (4 ft 11 in) tall. She converted to Protestant Christianity around when her son converted in 1903. She was reportedly devout, and calmed herself through difficult periods by praying and singing hymns.

Through Kim Ku, she had two grandchildren who survived past childhood, Kim In and Kim Shin. Through Kim Shin, she has descendants who lived in Shanghai as of 2005.
