= National Memorial of the Korean Provisional Government =

History museum in Seoul, South Korea

- 국립대한민국임시정부기념관
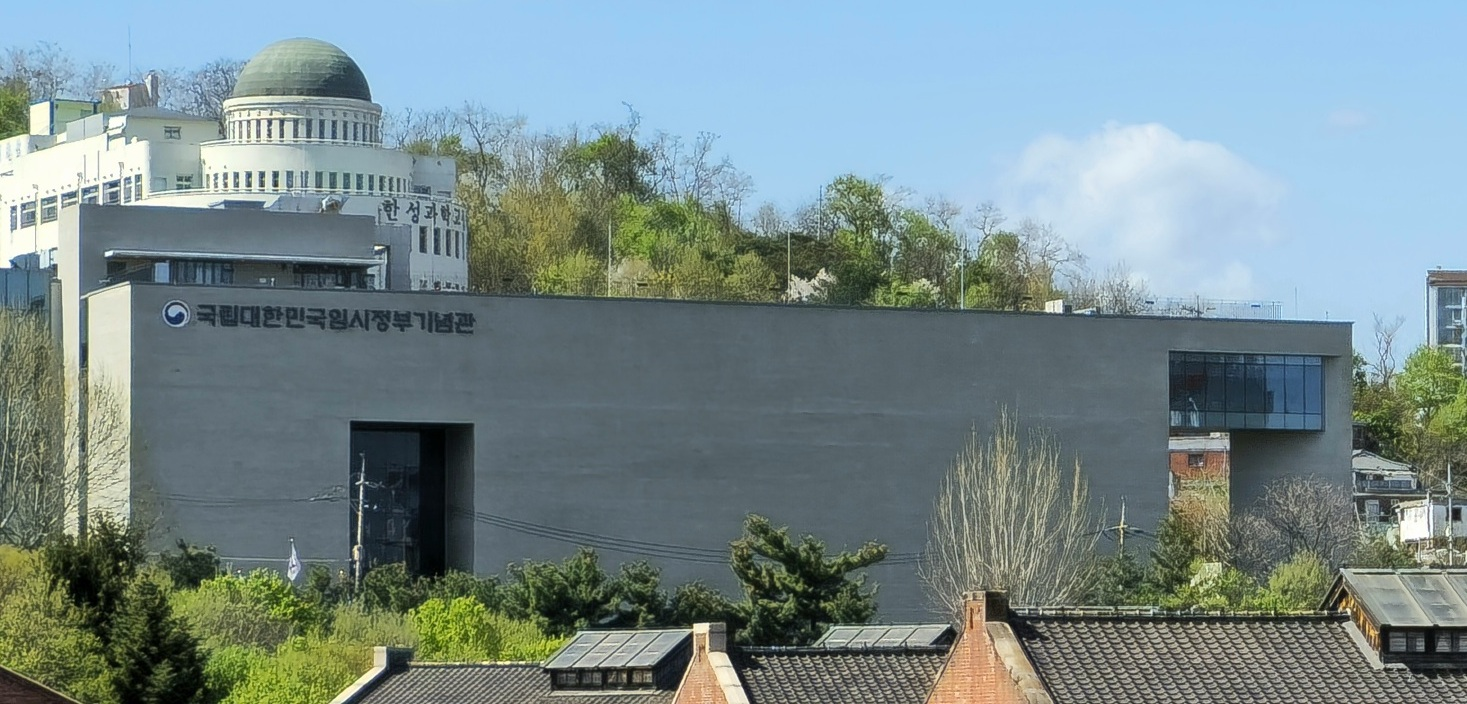
- The museum (2023)
- Established: March 1, 2022
- Location: Seoul, South Korea
- Coordinates: 37.5760°N 126.9543°E
- Type: History museum
- Website: www.nmkpg.go.kr/eng

The National Memorial of the Korean Provisional Government (Korean: 국립대한민국임시정부기념관) is a museum dedicated to the Provisional Government of the Republic of Korea located in Hyeonjeo-dong, Seoul, South Korea. It was established on March 1, 2022.

== Description ==
The museum covers the history of the Provisional Government of the Republic of Korea (Korean Provisional Government; KPG). That organization was established in 1919 in exile during the 1910–1945 Japanese colonial period and resisted the colonization.

The museum was first conceptualized in 2017. South Korean president Moon Jae-in gave a speech in which he vowed to create a memorial hall to the legacy of the provisional government. The museum was placed near Seodaemun Independence Park, which was formerly Seodaemun Prison: a site where Korean independence activists were imprisoned during the Japanese colonial period. It was originally supposed to open on November 23, 2021 (the anniversary of the KPG's return to Korea), but the opening was delayed due to the COVID-19 pandemic.

Upon the museum's establishment, it had a total floor area of 9,703 m^{2} (104,440 ft^{2}). It is a four-story building with three floors below ground. It has a rooftop garden and outdoor plaza. Visitors walk through the various exhibits, which show the history of the provisional government in chronological order. It has thousands of items related to the provisional government from a variety of sources.

== See also ==
- Kim Koo Museum
- Gyeonggyojang
- Museum of Japanese Colonial History in Korea
- Independence Hall of Korea
