= Provisional Government of the Republic of Korea Memorial Hall, Changsha =

Korean history museum in Changsha, China

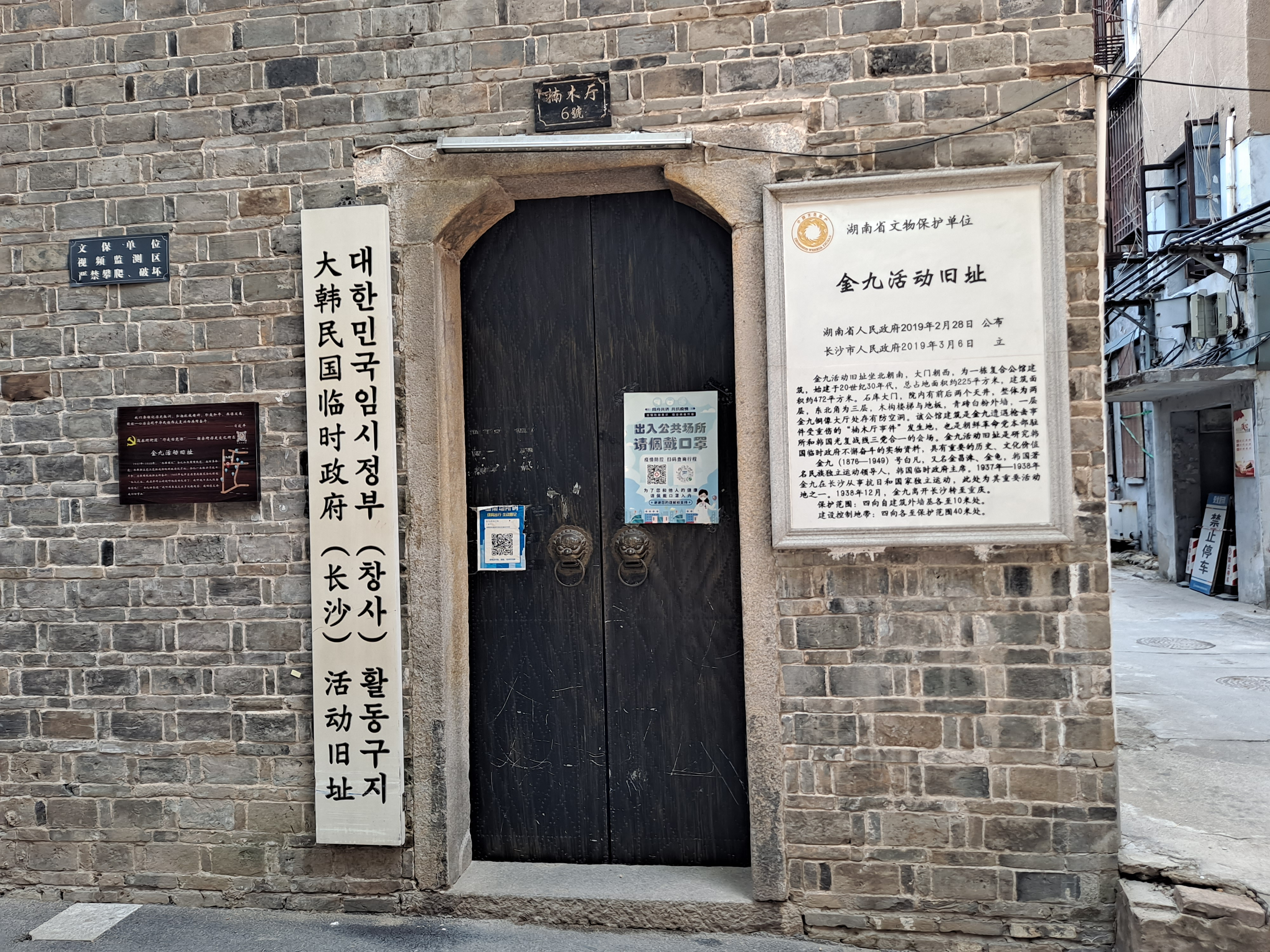
- Museum entrance (2022)
- Established: 2009
- Location: Changsha, China
- Coordinates: 28.2023°N 112.9737°E
- Type: History museum

The Provisional Government of the Republic of Korea Memorial Hall (Korean: 창사대한민국임시정부청사; Chinese: 大韩民国临时政府活动旧址) is a museum on the Provisional Government of the Republic of Korea located in Changsha, China. It was opened in 2009.

== Description ==
The Provisional Government of the Republic of Korea (Korean Provisional Government, KPG), a government-in-exile established by Koreans in China during the 1910–1945 Japanese colonial period, stayed around this area in Changsha from November 1937 to July 1938. The original building they stayed in has since disappeared. On May 7, 1938, KPG member Kim Ku and several others were shot around this area by an assassin. Kim survived, but others died.

In 2009, the city of Changsha opened a memorial hall for the KPG in the area. It was closed for renovations from 2017 to 2019.
