= Center for Historical Truth and Justice =

South Korean research institute

The Center for Historical Truth and Justice
- President: Lim Heon-yong
- Slogan: 인권 · 평화 · 미래를 생각하는 역사행동 ('Human rights, peace, and future-oriented historical action')
- Location: Cheongparo-47, Dagil-27, Yongsan District, South Korea
- Website: www.minjok.or.kr

The Center for Historical Truth and Justice (Korean: 민족문제연구소; Hanja: 民族問題硏究所; lit. 'Research Institute of Ethnic Issues') (Note: When the organization was established in 1991, its official name was 반민족문제연구소 (反民族問題硏究所; Research Institute of Anti-national/ethnic Problems), but since 1995 its official name has been 민족문제연구소.) or Korea Culture & Heritage Society is a research institute on historical issues established in 1991, and was established following the maintenance of Im Jong-guk, a social activist against Japanese imperialism and support anti-Collaborationism.

== Stance ==
The organization does not support any particular political party, but conservative South Korean media rate the organization as a left-leaning or progressive. The organization is strongly opposed to Japanophilic New Right politics.

This organization criticizes the Syngman Rhee administration for using pro-Japanese collaborators without purging them and for forcibly dissolving Special Investigation Committee of Anti-National Activities. The organization also criticizes Park Chung Hee's pro-Japanese collaborationism and dictatorship during his administration.

=== Korean nationalism ===
The organization has many minjokjuui-oriented figures, but these argue that minjokjuui (민족주의) is not at all exclusive or chauvinistic, but rather Korean minjokjuui is love human rights and peace. They argue that "far-right" (pro-Japanese) politicians like Park Chung Hee are "fake minjokjuui". Depending on the context, the Korean word minjokjuui may mean Korean nationalism, but it may also mean Korean ethnic nationalism. The organization opposes South Korea-centered state-based nationalism called kukkajuui (국가주의), and it is also opposes right-wing anti-communism.

When the ROKS Cheonan sinking occurred, the organization claimed that it was not an attack from North Korea. The organization opposes the military alliance with Japan and supports peaceful relations with North Korea.

The organization legally and institutionally supports the protection of the rights and interests of victims of "forced labor", a war crime committed by Japanese imperialism.

== Dictionary of Pro-Japanese Collaborators ==
The Dictionary of Pro-Japanese Collaborators is a biographical dictionary that lists Collaborators during the Korea under Japanese rule. The book was published by The Center for Historical Truth and Justice on Nov. 8, 2009.

== Museum of Japanese Colonial History in Korea ==
The Museum of Japanese Colonial History in Korea (식민지역사박물관) is a privately owned history museum in the Yongsan District of Seoul, South Korea. Its collections cover the period between 1910 and 1945 when Korea was under Japanese rule. The museum is operated by Center for Historical Truth and Justice.

== See also ==
- Korean nationalist historiography - the organization opposes pro-Japanese "colonialist historiography" (식민사학) and supports anti-colonial "minjok historiography" (민족사학).
- List of people in Pro-Japanese Biographical Dictionary
