= Daejeon National Cemetery =

Cemetery for veterans in South Korea

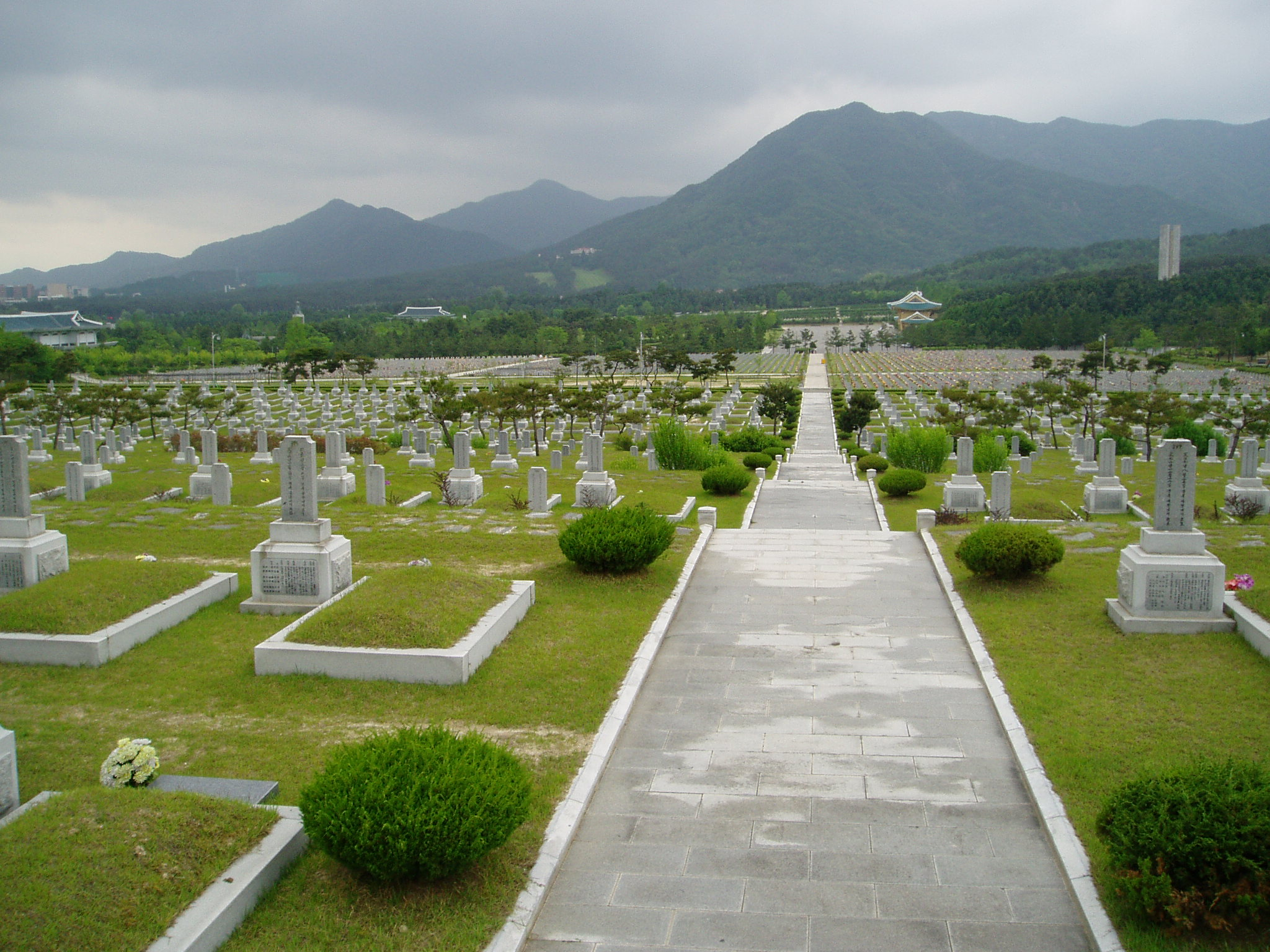
- View from inside the cemetery (2006)
- Interactive map of Daejeon National Cemetery

Details
- Established: 1976
- Location: Hyeonchungwon-ro, Yuseong-gu, Daejeon, Republic of Korea; 36°22′17″N 127°17′48″E
- Country: South Korea
- No. of graves: 110,000+

Korean name
- Hangul: 국립대전현충원
- Hanja: 國立大田顯忠院
- RR: Gungnip Daejeon hyeonchungwon
- MR: Kungnip Taejŏn hyŏnch'ungwŏn

The Daejeon National Cemetery (Korean: 국립대전현충원) is located in Hyeonchungwon-ro, Yuseong-gu, Daejeon, South Korea. It is South Korea's second national cemetery after the Seoul National Cemetery and is overseen by the Ministry of Patriots' and Veterans' Affairs (South Korea).

The cemetery is reserved for Korean veterans, including those who died in the Korean independence movement, Korean War, Vietnam War and post–Korean War clashes with North Korea.

== History ==
As the Seoul National Cemetery was reaching capacity in the early 1970s, on 16 December 1974, then President Park Chung-hee ordered that investigations commence for the establishment of a new national cemetery site. The Daejeon site was selected on 14 April 1976. Construction of the cemetery began on 1 April 1979 and the first burial took place on 27 August 1982. The cemetery was officially inaugurated on 13 November 1985.

The cemetery covers an area of 3,300,150 m^{2} and facilities include a Memorial Tower and Memorial Gate, Patriotic Spirit Exhibition Center, an outdoor exhibition space, fountains, statues, sculptures, pavilions, and Hyeonchungji, a man-made pond in the shape of the Korean Peninsula.

The cemetery allows access to the public.

== Baseline of usage ==
- The President, the President of the National Assembly
- Chief Justice of the Supreme Court or the President of the Constitutional Court
- The person who died as a patriotic branch and the patriotic line-up in accordance with Article 4 of the Act on the Honorable Treatment of independent Beneficiaries.

== Notable burials ==
- Hong Beom-do (1868-1943), a Korean independence fighter who died and was buried in Kazakhstan, with his body repatriated to his homeland 78 years later
- Sohn Kee-chung (1912–2002), first Korean to win a medal at the Olympic Games
- Hwang Jang-yop (1923–2010), highest-ranking North Korean politician who defected to South Korea in 1997
- Choi Kyu-hah (1919–2006), fourth President of South Korea
  - Hong Gi (1916–2004), wife of former president Choi
- Lee Jong-wook (1945–2006), director-general of the World Health Organization
- Shin Hyun-joon (1915–2007), first commander of the Republic of Korea Marine Corps
- All 46 crewmembers killed in the 2010 ROKS Cheonan sinking
- Hasa (Sergeant) Seo Jeong-wu and Ilbyeong (Lance Corporal) Moon Gwang-wuk, both South Korean marines, killed in the 2010 Bombardment of Yeonpyeong
- Kintarō Ōki (1929–2006), professional wrestler also known as "Kim Il".
- Lho Shin-yong (1930–2019), Prime Minister of South Korea between 1985–87
- Paik Sun-yup (1920–2020), first four-star general in the history of the South Korean military
- Kwak Nak-wŏn (1859–1939), mother of Kim Ku.
- Byun Hui-su (1998–2021), the first known transgender soldier in South Korea and Transgender rights activist.

== See also ==
- Cemetery for North Korean and Chinese Soldiers – in Paju, South Korea
- History of South Korea
- Kumsusan Palace of the Sun – in North Korea
- List of national cemeteries by country
- Patriotic Martyrs' Cemetery – in North Korea
- Revolutionary Martyrs' Cemetery – in North Korea
- Seoul National Cemetery
- United Nations Memorial Cemetery – in Busan
- War Memorial of Korea – in Seoul
