= Gyeonggyojang =

1938 historic building in South Korea

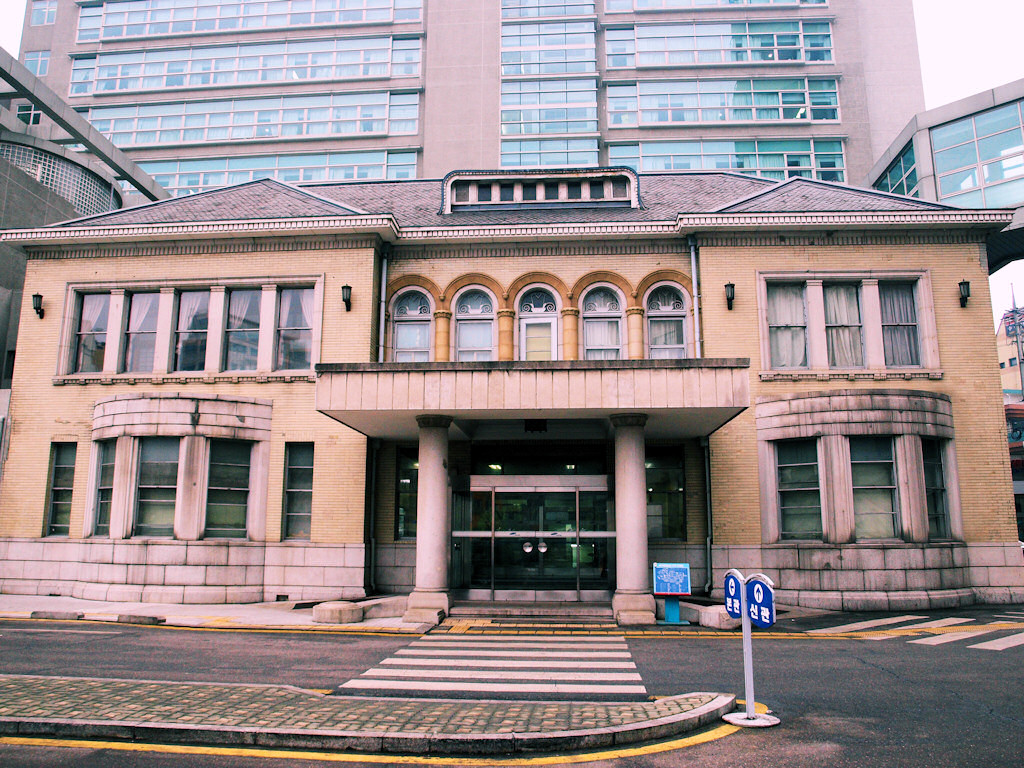
- The building exterior (2009)
- Interactive map of the Gyeonggyojang area

General information
- Type: House
- Location: 108-1, Pyeong-dong, Jongno District, Seoul, South Korea
- Coordinates: 37.5682°N 126.9680°E
- Opened: 1938

Design and construction
- Designations

Historic Sites of South Korea
- Official name: Gyeonggyojang House, Seoul
- Designated: 2005-06-13
- Reference no.: 465

Website
- museum.seoul.go.kr/eng/about/annex/gyeonggyojang.jsp

Korean name
- Hangul: 경교장
- Hanja: 京橋莊
- Revised Romanization: Gyeonggyojang
- McCune–Reischauer: Kyŏnggyojang

Original name
- Hangul: 죽첨장
- Hanja: 竹添莊
- Revised Romanization: Jukcheomjang
- McCune–Reischauer: Chukch'ŏmjang

Gyeonggyojang (Korean: 경교장) is a historic building located in Jongno District, Seoul, South Korea. It was built in 1938, during the Japanese colonial period. From November 4, 1945 to 1949, it was the private residence of Kim Ku, the President of the Provisional Government of the Republic of Korea, as well as the headquarters of that government and Kim's Korea Independence Party.

From 1949 to 1952, it was used as the embassy building of the Republic of China. It was used as part of Korea Hospital beginning in 1967. It was designated National Designated Cultural Heritage No. 465 on June 13, 2005.

== Description ==
Gyeonggyojang is located across the East Theater between Gwanghwamun and Seodaemun, which is the site of Samsung Medical Center in Pyeong-dong, Jongno District, near Seodaemun Station.

The building has two floors above ground and one basement floor. It is a Japanese-style house, which was built with a total floor area of 396.69 m^{2} and a total floor area of 945.45 m^{2} in 1938. The building was originally designed by Kim Se-yeon (김세연; 金世演; 1897–1975) and is considered to reflect the style of buildings in the 1930s.

The right and rear sides of the buildings are connected to the Gangbuk Samsung Hospital complex. However, inside the building, 391.67 m^{2} of the space is protected for historical purposes.

== History ==
Gyeonggyojang was originally built in 1938 by Choi Chang-hak. It was originally called "Jukcheomjang" (죽첨장; 竹添莊). Choi had accumulated great wealth through a mining business during the Japanese occupation of Korea.

After the liberation of Korea in 1945, it became the residence of Kim Ku and the headquarters of the Korean Provisional Government (KPG). Kim changed the building's name to "Gyeonggyojang", after the name of a nearby stream. It remained this way until Kim's assassination by Ahn Doo-hee on June 26, 1949.

Afterwards, it was returned to Choi Chang-hak, and used for a variety of purposes over the next few decades. It was used as the Taiwanese Embassy, a medical station during the Korean War, and the Vietnamese Embassy. In 1968 it became part of Korea Hospital (currently Gangbuk Samsung Hospital) and owned by Samsung. It was then attached to the main building of the hospital and has been used as an entrance to the hospital complex since.

Originally designated as Seoul Tangible Cultural Heritage No. 129 on April 6, 2001, it was promoted to National Designated Cultural Heritage No. 465 on June 13, 2005, after the importance of the building in modern and contemporary Korean history was reevaluated. Kim Ku's old office, located on the second floor of the building and west of the building, was also operated by Samsung as a Kim Ku memorial hall.

On August 14, 2009, the entire Gyeonggyojang was to be restored after 60 years, and all the hospital facilities in the building were moved and the construction began in March 2011 and opened on March 1, 2013.

== Gallery ==
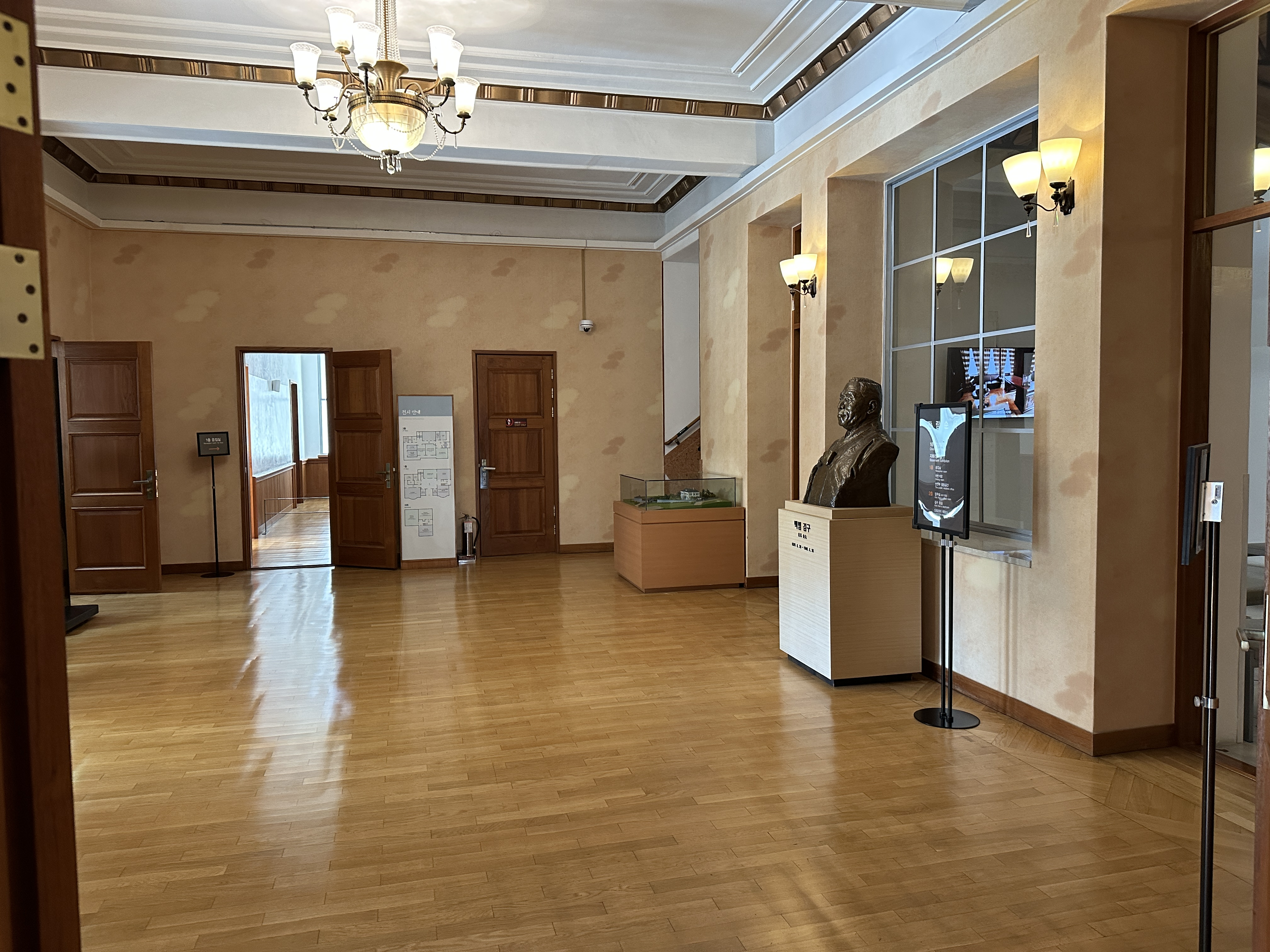
First floor, main entrance (viewed from the right hallway from entrance). A bust of Kim Ku is displayed (2023)

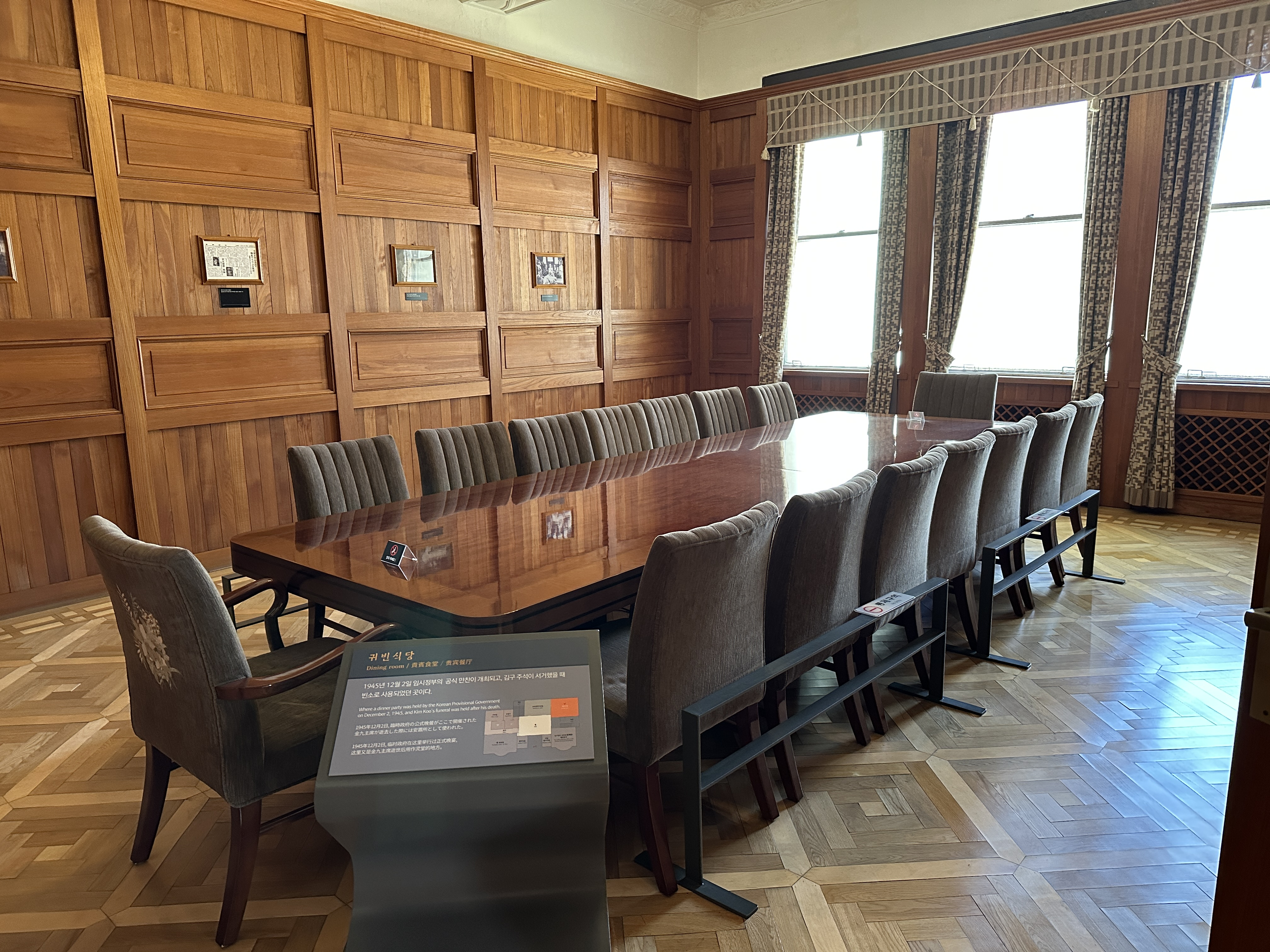
First floor, dining room (2023)

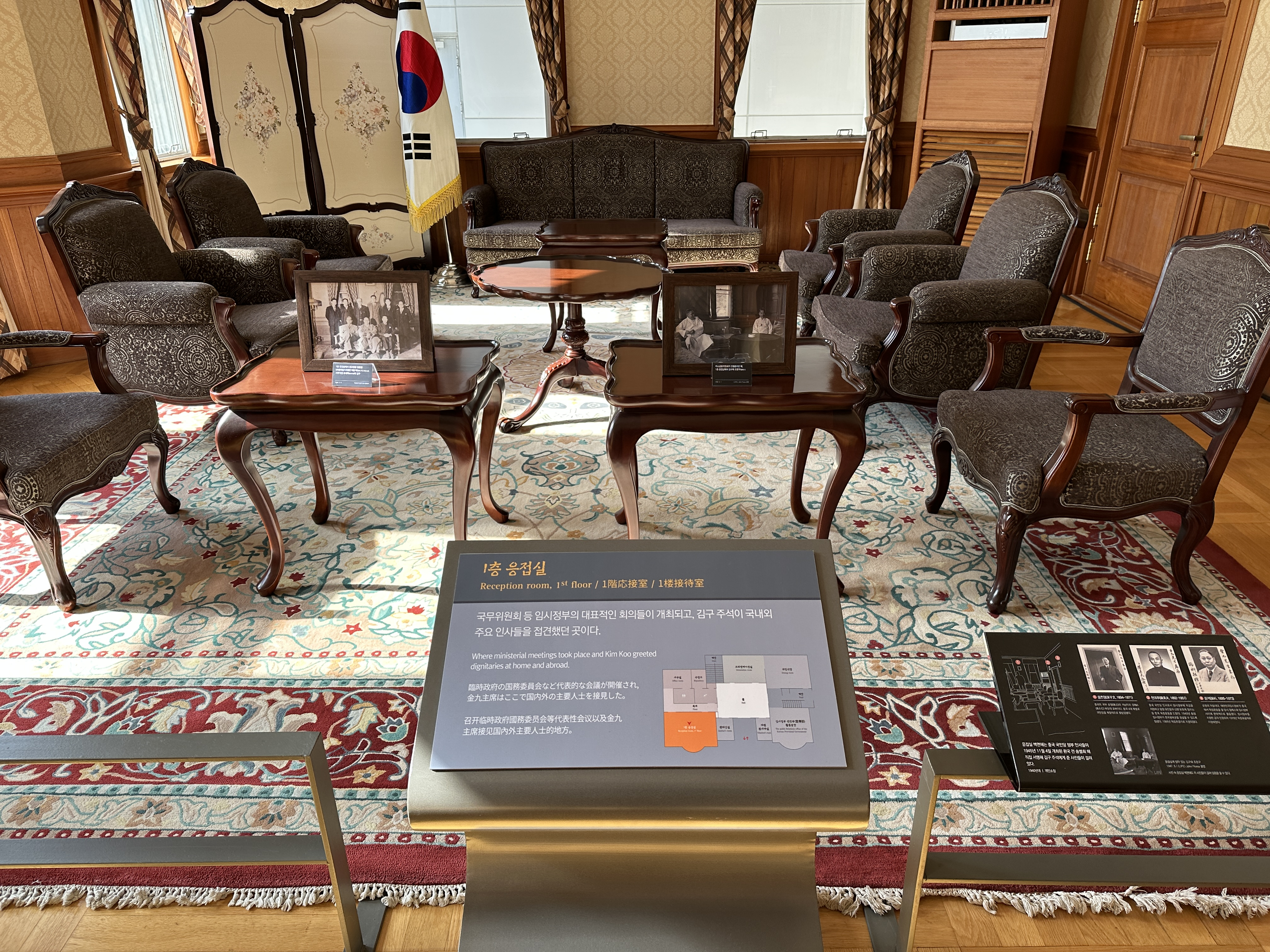
First floor, reception room (2023)

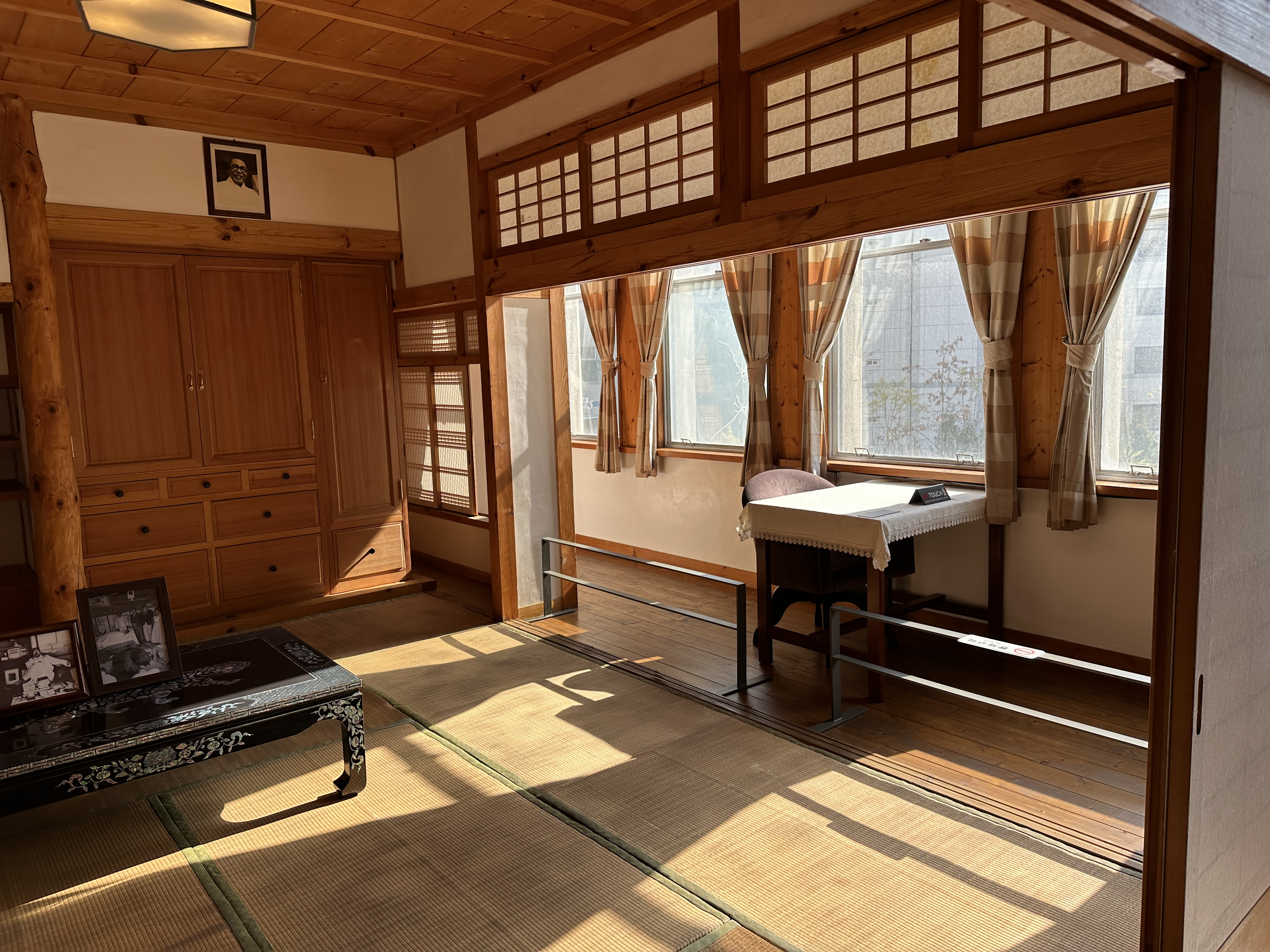
Second floor, Kim Ku's office, where he was assassinated. A nearby exhibit claims that the original bullet holes from the assassination were left in the third window from the right (2023)

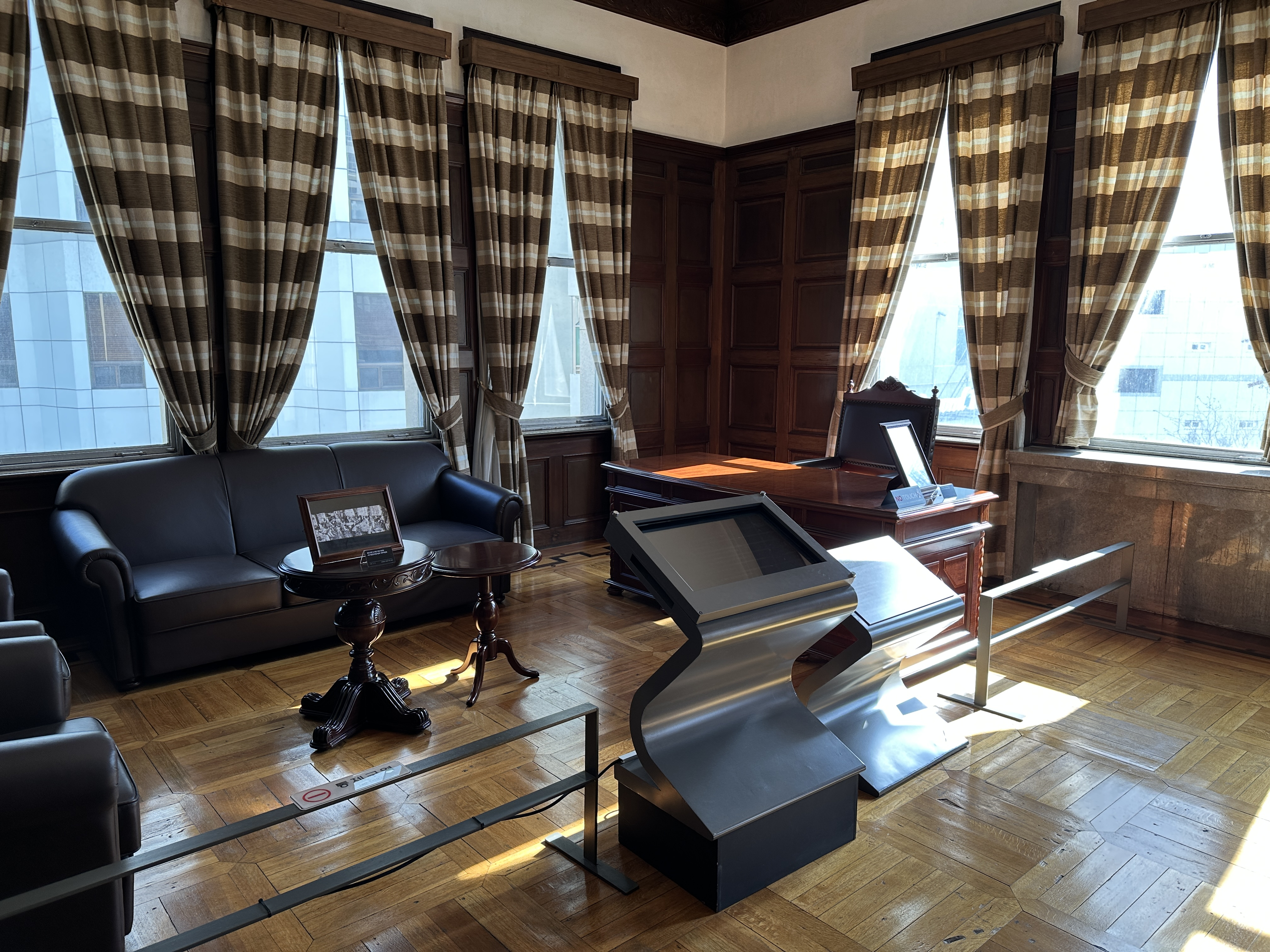
Second floor, meeting room (2023)

== See also ==
- National Memorial of the Korean Provisional Government
- Independence Hall of Korea
- Seodaemun Prison
- Museum of Japanese Colonial History in Korea
