= Independence Hall of Korea =

History museum in Cheonan, South Korea

Coordinates: 36.7836°N 127.2230°E

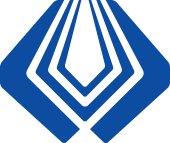

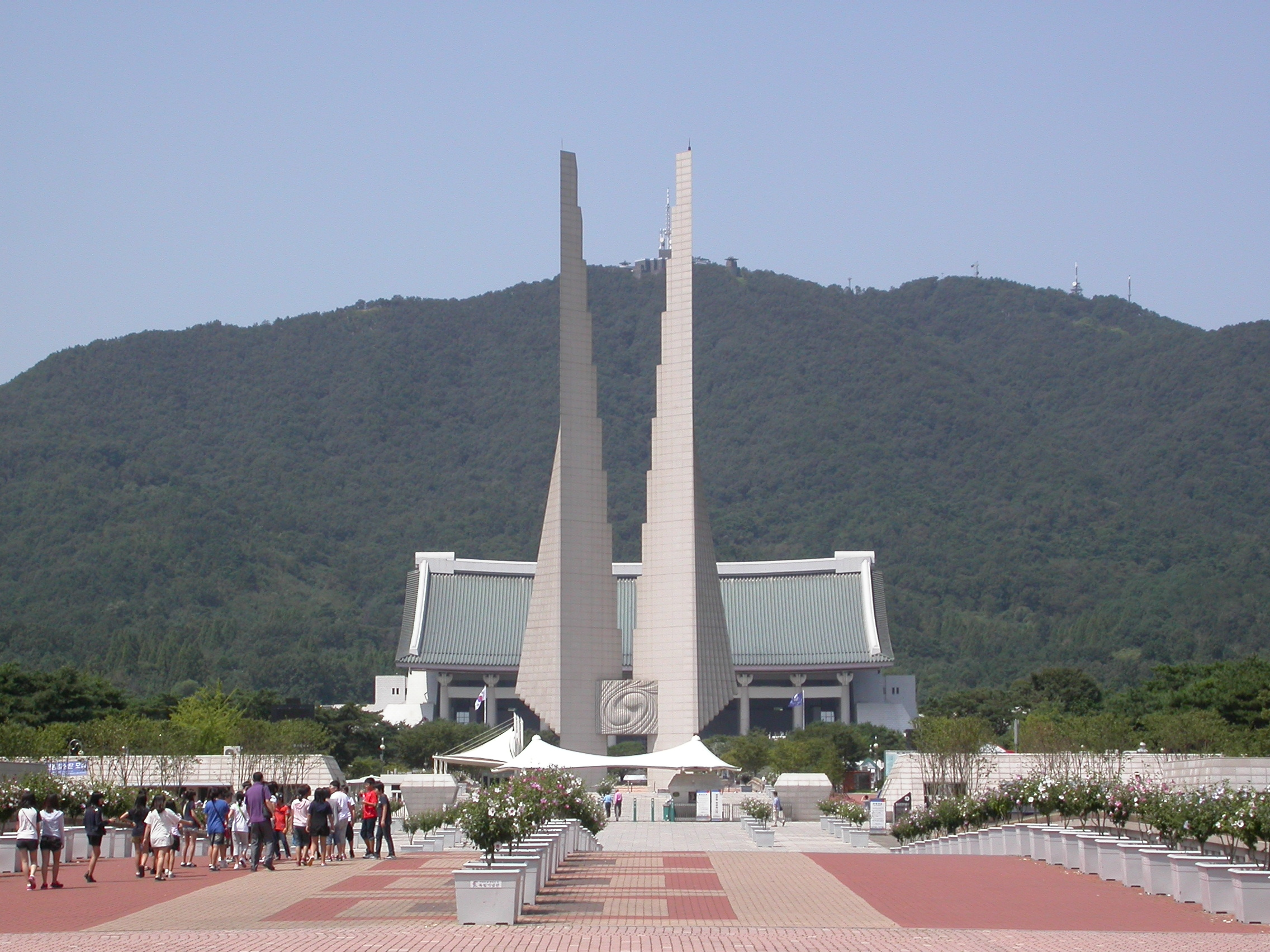
- Established: August 17, 1987
- Location: 230 Namhwari, Mokcheon-eup, Dongnam District, Cheonan, South Chungcheong Province, South Korea
- Type: History
- Director: Kim Nung-Jin
- Website: global.i815.or.kr/en (in English)

Korean name
- Hangul: 독립기념관
- Hanja: 獨立紀念館
- RR: Dongnip ginyeomgwan
- MR: Tongnip kinyŏmgwan

The Independence Hall of Korea (Korean: 독립기념관) is a Korean history museum in Cheonan, South Korea. Opened on August 15, 1987, it has the largest exhibition facility in South Korea, with a total floor area of 23424 m^{2}.

The museum primarily focuses on the Korean independence movement of the Japanese colonial period. However, the first exhibition hall, the Hall of National Heritage, is dedicated to the period ranging from prehistoric times to the Joseon dynasty. It has seven indoor exhibition halls and a Circle Vision Theater.

== Exhibits ==
There are seven exhibition spaces.

The first exhibition includes the Veritable Records of the Joseon Dynasty, a manual that shows the interpretation of Hangeul and its usage with also the introduction written by King Sejong the Great, and other artifacts, and a recreation of the turtle ship.

The second exhibition covers the period from the 1860s to the 1940s. It contains a copy of the first issue of the first privately owned Korean newspaper, Tongnip Sinmun. It also contains a copy of the Japan–Korea Treaty of 1905, and other artifacts from the Japanese colonial period.

The third exhibit contains artifacts related to the 1919 March 1st Movement, including a copy of the Korean Declaration of Independence.

The fourth exhibition hall focuses on the impact of the independence movement. In this hall there are four symbolic paths that the visitor can follow.

The fifth exhibition hall is called “Patriotic struggle for national independence” and it covers the anti-Japanese armed resistance that occurred in areas both inside and outside the nation. It contains a Taegeukgi used during the 1920 Battle of Fengwudong.

The sixth exhibition named “Establishing the Great Korea” covers people's independence movement and the activities of the Korean Provisional Government which is the first democratic government and also the supreme organization of independence movement established after the March 1st Movement.

The seventh are movies themed on Korean History.

There are also remnants of the old Japanese headquarters, the Government-General of Chōsen Building.

== Events ==
The Independence Hall of Korea also hosts different events across the year, including a reenactment of the March 1st Movement on its anniversary, events for children on Children's Day, a large event on National Liberation Day on August 15, and a Fall Cultural Zone event in October.

Despite the challenges of the COVID-19 pandemic, the Independence Hall of Korea hosted National Liberation Day festivities on August 15 throughout the pandemic. On August 8, 2024, newly appointed director Kim Hyeong-seok, decided to cancel the 2024 festival. Despite not canceling a single Liberation Day Festival since opening in 1987, Director Kim stated that he had decided to attend the Liberation Day celebration event hosted by the government instead. In response, the floor leader of the Democratic Party Park Chan-dae demanded a revocation of the appointment of Director Kim Hyeong-seok and threatened a Democrat-led impeachment protocol for the Director.

== History ==
In March 2013, actress Song Hye-kyo donated the production cost of braille brochures for the Hall. With the help of scholar Seo Kyung-duk of Sungshin Women's University, 1,000 copies are to be made available with more in the planning, as not many museums provide braille brochures for the blind. She reportedly decided to help after playing a blind woman in 2013 Seoul Broadcasting System drama That Winter, the Wind Blows.

== See also ==
- National Museum of Korea
- National Museum of Korean Contemporary History
- Independence Gate
- Kim Koo Museum
- Museum of Japanese Colonial History in Korea
- National Memorial of the Korean Provisional Government
