= List of gates in Korea =

There are a number of significant extant and destroyed gates in North and South Korea. The following list is arranged alphabetically by official English name.

== Gates in North and South Korea ==
Official name	Alternate names	City, country	Notes	Image
Bukammun (북암문) North Secret Gate		Suwon, South Korea	North Secret Gate of Hwaseong Fortress.	Bukammun Gate, Suwon, Korea
Changnyongmun (창룡문)	Dongmun East Gate	Suwon, South Korea	East Gate of Hwaseong Fortress.	Changryongmun Gate, Suwon, Korea
Changuimun (창의문; 彰義門) Showing the Correct Thing Gate	Buksomun (북소문) North Small Gate North West Gate Jahamun	Seoul, South Korea	Originally built in 1396. Gatehouse was burned down in 1592, and rebuilt in 1740.	Changuimun Gate, Seoul, Korea
Chilsongmun		Pyongyang, North Korea	The northern gate in walled city of Pyongyang. Originally built in 6th century. National treasure#18 of North Korea.	
Daehanmun		Seoul, South Korea	The main gate of Deoksugung Palace.	
Dongammun (동암문) East Secret Gate		Suwon, South Korea	East Secret Gate of Hwaseong Fortress.	Dongammun Gate, Suwon, Korea
Dongnimmun (독립문; 獨立門)	Independence Gate	Seoul, South Korea	Constructed in 1896–97. Relocated in 1979. Located in Seodaemun Independence Park	Independence Gate, Seoul, Korea
Donuimun (돈의문; 敦義門) Loyalty Gate	Seodaemun (서대문) West Great Gate	Seoul, South Korea	Originally built in 1396. No longer exists. Torn down in 1915 during the Japanese colonial period.	Donuimun Gate, Seoul, Korea
Gaeseonmun (개선문; 凱旋門)	Arch of Triumph	Pyongyang, North Korea	Built in 1982. Commemorates Korean resistance against Japanese rule.	Gaeseonmun Gate, Pyongyang, North Korea
Geonchunmun		Seoul, South Korea	The east gate of Gyeongbokgung Palace.	
Geunjeongmun		Seoul, South Korea	The third inner gate of Gyeongbokgung Palace.	
Gwanghuimun (광희문; 光熙門) Bright Light Gate	Namsomun (남소문) South Small Gate South East Gate	Seoul, South Korea	Originally built in 1396. Rebuilt 1711–1719. Largely destroyed during the Korean War, but restored in 1976.	Gwanghuimun Gate, Seoul, Korea
Gwanghwamun (광화문; 光化門)		Seoul, South Korea	Originally built in 1395. The south and main gate of Gyeongbokgung Palace.	Gwanghwamun Gate, Seoul, Korea
Heunginjimun (흥인지문; 興仁之門) Rising Benevolence Gate	Dongdaemun (동대문) East Great Gate	Seoul, South Korea	Originally built 1398. Originally called Heunginmun (slightly different from present name). Present construction dates from 1869.	Heunginjimun Gate, Seoul, Korea
Heungnyemun		Seoul, South Korea	The second inner gate of Gyeongbokgung Palace.	
Hwahongmun (화홍문)	Buksumun North Water Gate	Suwon, South Korea	North Water Gate of Hwaseong Fortress.	Hwahongmun Water Gate, Suwon, Korea
Hwaseomun (화서문)	West Gate	Suwon, South Korea	West Gate of Hwaseong Fortress.	Hwaseomun Gate, Suwon, Korea
Hyehwamun (혜화문; 惠化門) Distribution of Wisdom Gate	Dongsomun (동소문) East Small Gate Honghwamn	Seoul, South Korea	Originally built in 1396. Originally called Honghwamun. Destroyed during the Japanese colonial period, but restored in 1992.	Hyehwamun Gate, Seoul, Korea
Jangammun (장안문)	Bungmun North Gate	Suwon, South Korea	North Gate of Hwaseong Fortress.	North Gate, Suwon, Korea
Jeonsungmun (전승문; 戰勝門)	Bukmun (북문) North Gate	Seongnam, South Korea	North Gate of Namhansanseong Fortress.	North Gate of Namhansanseong, Seongnam, Korea
Jihwamun (지화; 至和門)	Nammun (남문) South Gate	Seongnam, South Korea	South Gate of Namhansanseong Fortress.	South Gate of Namhansanseong, Seongnam, Korea
Joaikmun (좌익문; 左翼門)	Dongmun (동문) East Gate	Seongnam, South Korea	East Gate of Namhansanseong Fortress.	East Gate of Namhansanseong, Seongnam, Korea
Namdaemun (남대문) South Great Gate		Kaesong, North Korea	South gate of the old walled city of Kaesong. Originally constructed between 1391 and 1393. Listed among the National Treasures of North Korea.	Namdaemun Gate in Kaesong
Namsumun (남수문) South Floodgate		Suwon, South Korea	South Floodgate of Hwaseong Fortress. Destroyed in 1922 and reconstructed in 2012.	
Paldalmun (팔달문)	Nammun (남대문) South Gate	Suwon, South Korea	South gate of Hwaseong Fortress.	Paldalmn Gate, Suwon, Korea
Potongmun (보통문)		Pyongyang, North Korea	West gate of the old walled city of Pyongyang. Originally constructed in the 6th century. Listed as #3 among the National Treasures of North Korea.	
Pungnammun (보통문; 普通門)		Jeonju, South Korea	The South Gate of Jeonju.	Pungnammun Gate, Jeonju, South Korea
Seoammun (서암문) West Secret Gate		Suwon, South Korea	West Secret Gate of Hwaseong Fortress.	Seoammun Gate, Suwon, Korea
Seonam Ammun (서남암문) South-West Secret Gate		Suwon, South Korea	South-West Secret Gate of Hwaseong Fortress.	Seonam Ammun Gate, Suwon, Korea
Sinmumun		Seoul, South Korea	The north gate of Gyeongbokgung Palace.	
Souimun (소의문; 昭義門) Promotion of Justice Gate	Seosomun (서소문) West Small Gate Sodeongmun South West	Seoul, South Korea	Originally built in 1396. Originally called Sodeongmun. No longer exists. Torn down in 1914 during the Japanese colonial period.	Souimun Gate historical image, Seoul, Korea
Sukjeongmun (숙정문) Rule Solemnly Gate	Bukdaemun (북대문) North Great Gate	Seoul, South Korea	Originally built in 1396. Originally called Sukcheongmun.	Sukjeongmun Gate, Seoul, Korea
Sungnyemun (숭례문; 崇禮門) Exalted Ceremonies Gate	Namdaemun (남대문) South Great Gate	Seoul, South Korea	Originally built in 1398. Heavily damaged by fire in 2008. Currently being restored (2012).	Korea-Seoul-Namdaemun-Sungnyemun-11
Taedongmun (대동문; 大同門) Great East Gate		Pyongyang, North Korea	East gate of the old walled city of Pyongyang. Originally constructed in the 6th century. Listed as #4 among the National Treasures of North Korea.	Taedongmun Gate, Pyongyang, North Korea
Wooikmun (우익문; 右翼門)	Seomun (서문) West Gate	Seongnam, South Korea	West Gate of Namhansanseong Fortress.	West Gate of Namhansanseong, Seongnam, Korea
Yeongchumun		Seoul, South Korea	The west gate of Gyeongbokgung Palace.	
Yeongeunmun (迎恩門)		Seoul, South Korea	Only remnants of this gate remain. Located in Seodaemun Independence Park.	Yeongeunmun-Inwang

== See also ==
- List of fortresses in Korea
- Korean architecture
