= Sinyeong-dong =

- Interactive map of Sinyeong-dong
- Country: South Korea

Area
  - Total: 0.36 km^{2} (0.14 sq mi)

Korean name
- Hangul: 신영동
- Hanja: 新營洞
- RR: Sinyeong-dong
- MR: Sinyŏng-dong

Sinyeong-dong (Korean: 신영동) is a dong (neighbourhood) of Jongno District, Seoul, South Korea. It is a legal dong (법정동 法定洞) administered under its administrative dong (행정동 行政洞), Buam-dong.

== See also ==
- Administrative divisions of South Korea
