= The Eight Gates of Seoul =

Historic buildings in Seoul, South Korea

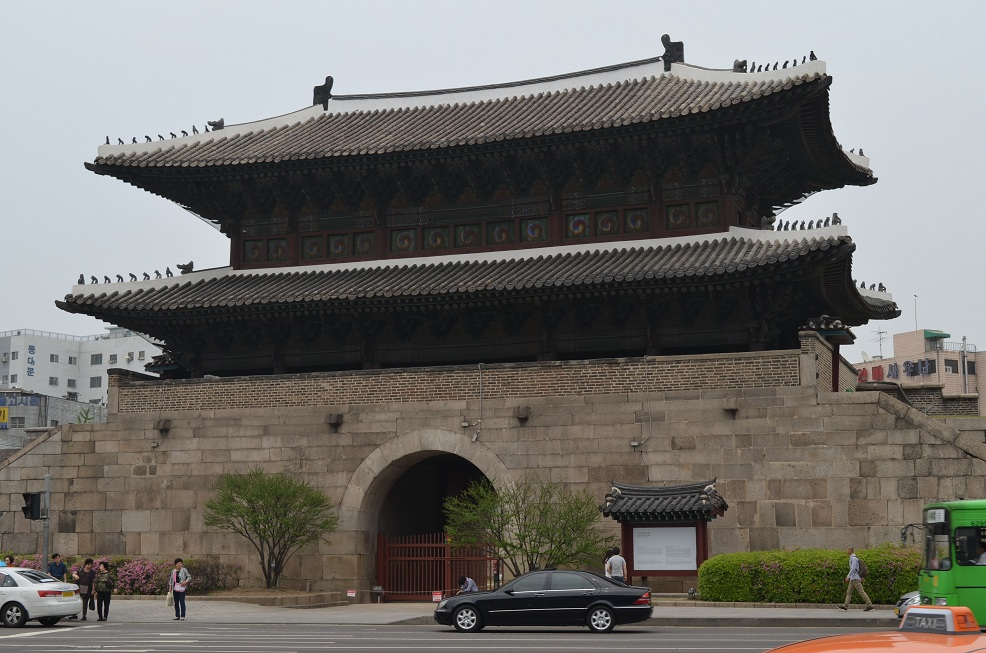
Heunginjimun, one of the Eight Gates (2012)

The Eight Gates of Seoul are a series of historic gates located in Seoul, South Korea. Two of the gates are now destroyed, although the others are still standing. The gates were constructed between 1396 and 1398, and allowed access to the city, which was surrounded by the Seoul City Wall during the Joseon period.

== Introduction ==
Locations of the Eight Gates (marks in a circle)

The Eight Gates were based roughly in the four cardinal and four intermediate directions of the compass. Of the eight gates, the North, South, East, and West were known as the “Four Great Gates” (사대문), while the Northwest, Northeast, Southeast, and Southwest gates were known as the “Four Small Gates” (사소문).

Of the eight gates, two (West and Southwest) no longer exist. Memorials are currently placed roughly where the West and Southwest gates once stood (July 2012). There has been discussion and announcements about rebuilding the West Gate, but no construction has yet been undertaken (as of July 2012) for this gate.

On February 10, 2008, the South Gate was severely damaged in a fire set by an arsonist. The gate was rebuilt over five years, and reopened to the public on May 4, 2013. This gate has the designation of National Treasure No. 1 of South Korea. Of the eight gates, the South and East gates are the largest, and both are located in busy market areas (Namdaemun Market and Dongdaemun Market, respectively).

== Names ==
The eight gates have had various names over the centuries, and may still be referenced by different names. The charts below give the most common names for the gates. Official names and spellings are taken from signage currently found at and on the gates themselves. Note that Hanja is read right-to-left at times, and left-to right at other times. Thus, the character for "gate" (mun, 門) may appear either on the left or right side of actual signboards.

=== The Four Great Gates ===
	signboard	Heunginjimun Signboard, Seoul, Korea	Heunginjimun Signboard, Seoul, Korea	Sungnyemun Signboard, Seoul, Korea, May 2013	Donuimun Signboard, Seoul, Korea
		North Gate	East Gate	South Gate	West Gate
Official names	Romanization	Sukjeongmun	Heunginjimun	Sungnyemun	Donuimun
	Korean Hangul	숙정문	흥인지문	숭례문	돈의문
	Sino-Korean Hanja	肅靖門	興仁之門	崇禮門	敦義門
	literal translation	Rule Solemnly Gate	Rising Benevolence Gate	Exalted Ceremonies Gate	Loyalty Gate
directional names	Romanization	Bukdaemun	Dongdaemun	Namdaemun	Seodaemun
	Korean Hangul	북대문	동대문	남대문	서대문
	Sino-Korean Hanja	北大門	東大門	南大門	西大門
	literal meaning	“north big gate”	“east big gate”	“south big gate”	“west big gate”
	other names	Originally called Sukcheongmun.	Originally called Heunginmun (slightly different from present name).		
	notes	Originally built in 1396.; Gatehouse later burned down; current gatehouse dates from 1976.	Originally built 1398. Present construction dates from 1869.	Originally built in 1398.; Heavily damaged by fire in 2008. Reopened in May 2013.	Originally built 1396.; No longer exists. Torn down in 1915 during the Japanese colonial period. Plans to rebuild exist, and is presumed to start in 2022.

==== The Four Small Gates ====
	signboard	Changuimun Signboard, Seoul, Korea	Hyehwamun Signboard, Seoul, Korea	Gwanghuimun Signboard, Seoul, Korea	Souimun Gate Marker, detail, Seoul, Korea
		Northwest Gate	Northeast Gate	Southeast Gate	Southwest Gate
official names	Romanization	Changuimun	Hyehwamun	Gwanghuimun	Souimun
	Korean Hangul	창의문	혜화문	광희문	소의문
	Sino-Korean Hanja	彰義門	惠化門	光熙門	昭義門
	literal translation	Showing the Correct Thing Gate	Distribution of Wisdom Gate	Bright Light Gate	Promotion of Justice Gate
directional names	Romanization	Buksomun	Dongsomun	Namsomun	Seosomun
	Korean Hangul	북소문	동소문	남소문	서소문
	Sino-Korean Hanja	北小門	東小門	南小門	西小門
	literal meaning	"north small gate"	"east small gate"	"south small gate"	"west small gate"
	other names	Jahamun.	Originally called Honghwamun.	Originally called Sugumun ("Water Channel Gate")	Originally called Sodeokmun.
	notes	Originally built in 1396.; Gatehouse was burned down in 1592, and rebuilt in 1740–1741. The gate currently has the oldest gatehouse of the small gates.	Originally built in 1396.; Destroyed during the Japanese colonial period, but restored in 1992.	Originally built in 1396.; Rebuilt 1711–1719. Largely destroyed during the Korean War, but restored in 1976.	Originally built in 1396.; No longer exists. Torn down in 1914 during the Japanese colonial period.

== Images ==
gate	front view	other view
Northwest Gate Changuimun	Changuimun Gate, Seoul, Korea	Changuimun Gate, rear view, Seoul, Korea
North Gate Sukjeongmun	Sukjeongmun Gate, Seoul, Korea	Sukjeongmun Gate, rear view, Seoul, Korea
Northeast Gate Hyehwamun	Hyehwamun Gate, Seoul, Korea	Hyehwamun Gate, detail, Seoul, Korea
East Gate Heunginjimun	Heunginjimun Gate, Seoul, Korea	Heunginjimun Gate, side view, Seoul, Korea
Southeast Gate Gwanghuimun	Gwanghuimun Gate, Seoul, Korea	Gwanghuimun Gate, with Fortress Wall, Seoul, Korea
South Gate Sungnyemun	Sungnyemun Gate, Seoul, Korea. Front of gate, photographed April, 2013	Sungnyemun Gate, Seoul, Korea. Rear of gate, photographed April, 2013
Southwest Gate Souimun (No longer exists)	Souimun Gate historical image, Seoul, Korea	Souimun Gate marker, Seoul, Korea
West Gate Donuimun (No longer exists)	Donuimun Gate, Seoul, Korea	Donuimun Gate Memorial, Seoul, Korea

== See also ==
- List of gates in Korea

== Notes ==
=== References ===
- Heunginjimun: https://web.archive.org/web/20120611045420/http://www.exploringkorea.com/heunginjimun-gate/ Retrieved 2012.06-16.
- Sukjeongmun: Retrieved 2012-06-16.
- Sungnyemun (South gate): http://english.visitkorea.or.kr/enu/SI/SI_EN_3_1_1_1.jsp?cid=264257 Retrieved 2012-06-16.
- Changuimun: http://english.visitkorea.or.kr/enu/SI/SI_EN_3_1_1_1.jsp?cid=1035096 Retrieved 2012-06-16.
- Hyehwamun: http://english.visitkorea.or.kr/enu/SI/SI_EN_3_1_1_1.jsp?cid=1061567 Retrieved 2012-06-16.
- Gwanghuimun: https://web.archive.org/web/20120611045410/http://www.exploringkorea.com/gwanghuimun-gate/ Retrieved 2012-06-16.
- Donuimun: http://english.chosun.com/site/data/html_dir/2009/10/22/2009102200725.html Retrieved 2012-06-16.
- Translations: Retrieved 2012.06.16.
