= Changuimun =

Old northwest gate of Seoul, South Korea

Coordinates: 37°35′33.41″N 126°57′59.74″E

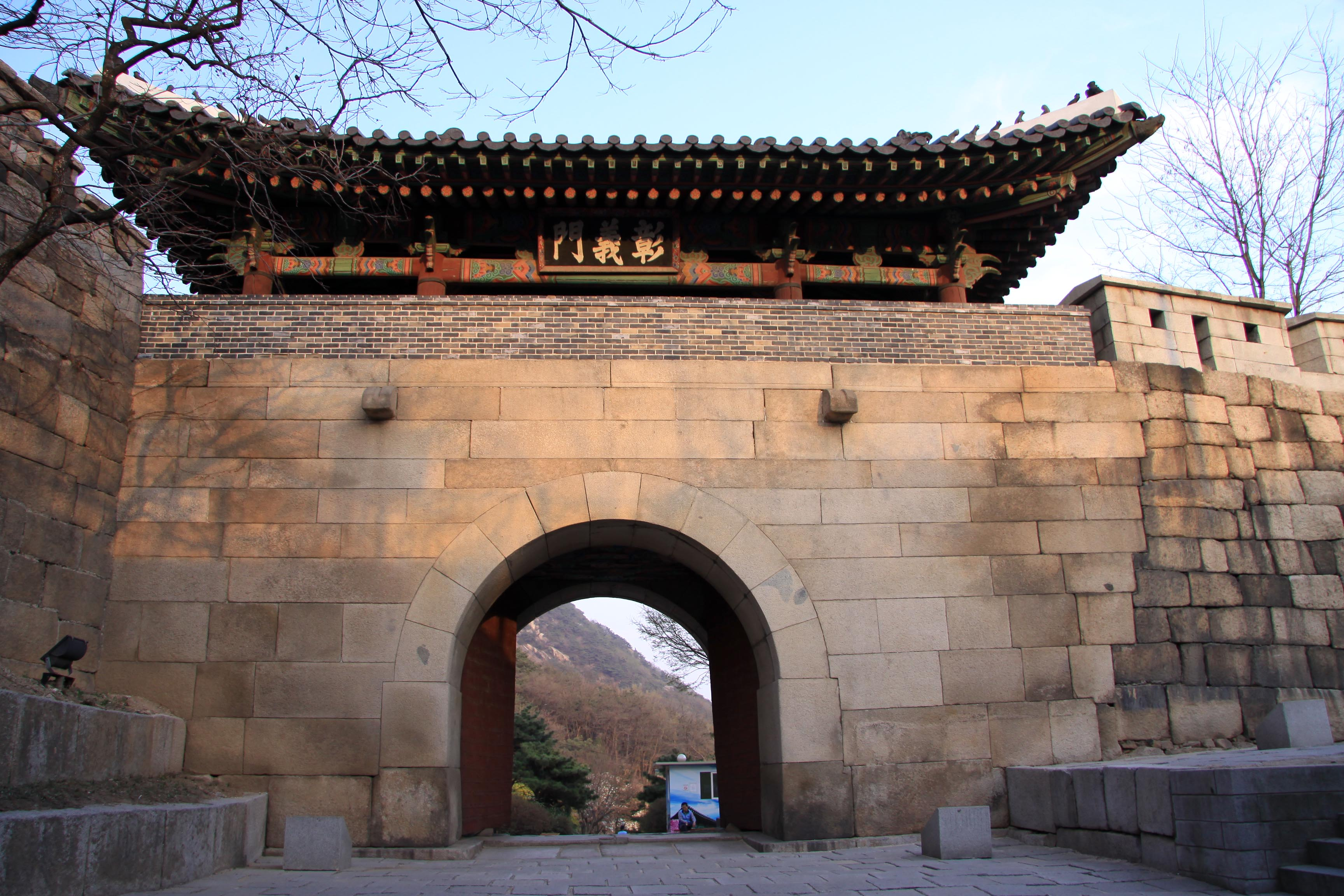

Korean name
- Hangul: 창의문
- Hanja: 彰義門
- RR: Changuimun
- MR: Ch'angŭimun

Changuimun (Korean: 창의문; Hanja: 彰義門; also known as Northwest Gate) is one of the Eight Gates of Seoul in the Fortress Wall of Seoul, South Korea, which surrounded the city in the Joseon period. The gate is also known as Buksomun (북소문; lit. North Small Gate) and Jahamun (자하문).

== History ==
Changuimun was originally built in 1396. Along with Hyehwamun (the Northeast Gate), Changuimun served as a major portal for those exiting the walled city of Seoul, then known as Hanyang (한양; 漢陽) to travel north. (Sukjeongmun, the North Gate, had a largely ceremonious function.) The wooden gatehouse above Changuimun was burned down during the 16th century invasions by Japan, but was rebuilt in 1740 or 1741. The gatehouse is currently the oldest gatehouse of those on the "Four Small Gates" (사소문) in the Fortress Wall of Seoul. The name Changuimun means literally "Showing the Correct Thing Gate."

== Preservation ==
Changuimun is located in Jongno District, Buam-dong, Seoul. It can be accessed easily via taking subway line 1 to Jonggak Station exit 3, then taking bus 7022 at Jeil Bank, and getting off at Jahamun Tunnel. Visitors to the gate today are allowed access to the front and the back of the gate, and under the gate itself. Visitors may also carefully view the wooden gatehouse above the gate, but are not allowed inside, and should not approach too closely due to a laser alarm system (July 2012).

If approaching the gate from the west, visitors notice there is a gate-like tunnel leading up to the gate itself. (See image below.)

The gate is known for being in a very early state of preservation, compared with the rest of the Eight Gates of Seoul.

The wooden rafters on the interior of the gate are decorated with chickens, which were known as enemies of the centipede. This is in contrast to Hyehwamun, whose rafters are decorated with the phoenix, enemies of small birds.

Very close to Changuimun are memorials to two people who lost their lives defending South Korea during the Blue House Raid on January 21, 1968: Superintendent General Choi Gyu-sik (see image below); and the Assistant Inspector Officer, Jung Jong-su.

Visitors can walk through the passageway to view gate. People are allowed to go up the stairs.

== Images ==
Changuimun, front of gate, June 2012.	Changuimun Gate, Seoul, Korea
Changuimun, rear of gate, June 2012. Visitors walking through gate.	Changuimun Rear View, Seoul, Korea
Changuimun, rear of gate, showing wooden gatehouse, June 2012.	Changuimun Gate, rear view, Seoul, Korea
Changuimun, signboard of gate.	Changuimun Signboard, Seoul, Korea
Changuimun, rafter detail inside gate showing chicken design.	Changuimun Gate, rafter detail, Seoul, Korea
Changuimun gatehouse, reconstructed in the 18th century.	Changuimun Gate, Gatehouse, Seoul, Korea
Changuimun gatehouse detail, showing Fortress Wall continuation across street.	Changuimun Gatehouse, Fortress Wall, Seoul, Korea
Changuimun, photo taken from underneath gate, showing tunnel leading up to gate.	Changuimun Gate, tunnel, Seoul, Korea
Statue of Choi Gyu-sik, located next to Changuimun. in Buam-dong, Seoul. Choi Gyu-sik (1932–1968) is a police officer who was killed during the 21 January Incident when North Korean agents attempted to assassinate then-President Park Chung Hee.	Changuimun, Choi Gyu-sik memorial, Seoul, Korea
