= Buam-dong =

Buam-dong may refer to:

- Buam-dong, Seoul in Jongno-gu, Seoul, South Korea
- Buam-dong, Busan in Busanjin-gu, Busan, South Korea
