= Namdaemun =

Old south gate of Seoul, South Korea

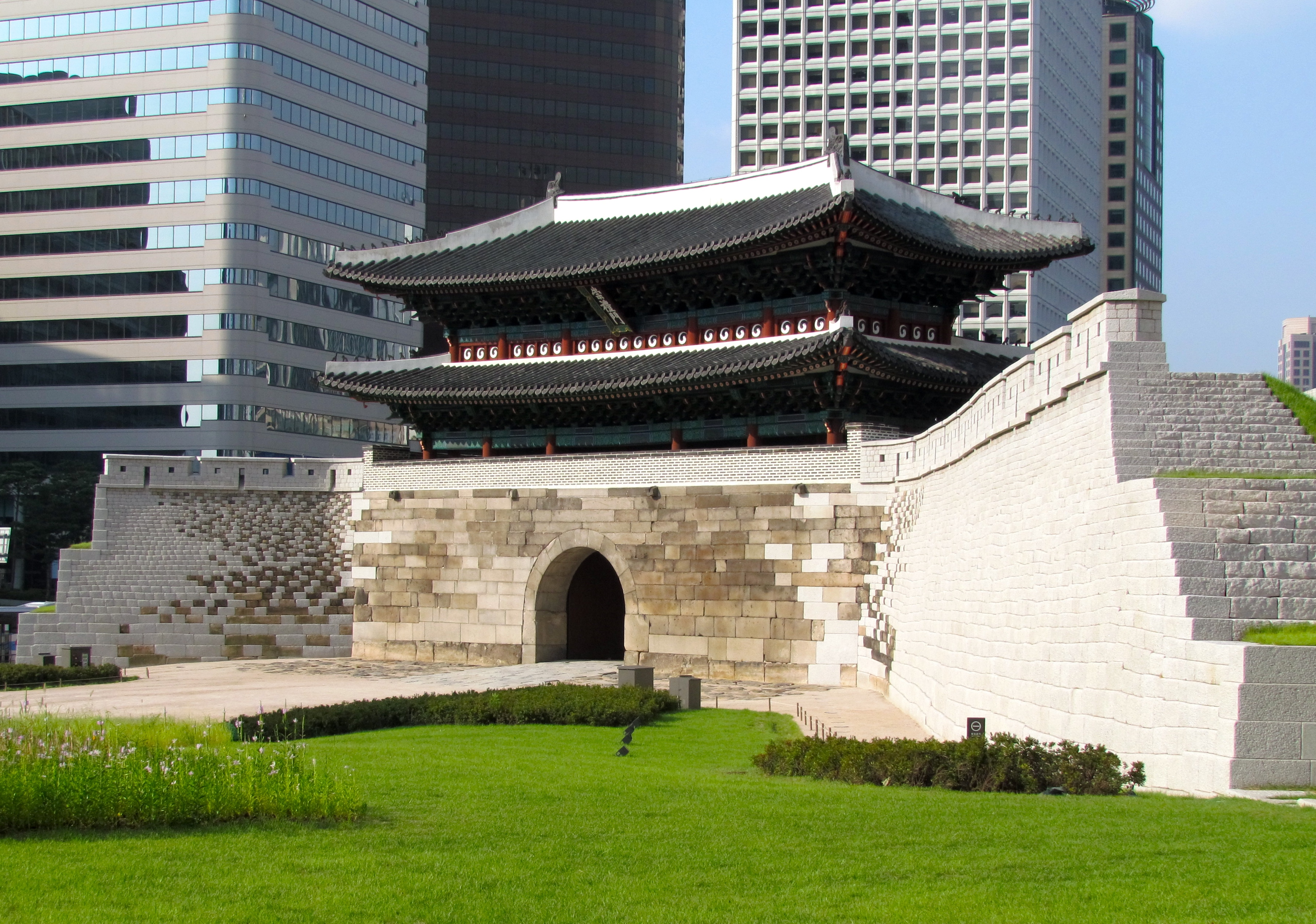
- Namdaemun in 2013

General information
- Location: Jung District, Seoul, South Korea
- Coordinates: 37°33′36″N 126°58′31″E
- Opened: 1398

Design and construction
- Designations

National Treasure (South Korea)
- Designated: 1962-12-20
- Reference no.: 1

Korean name
- Hangul: 남대문; 숭례문
- Hanja: 南大門; 崇禮門
- RR: Namdaemun; Sungnyemun
- MR: Namdaemun; Sungnyemun

Namdaemun (Korean: 남대문; lit. 'South Great Gate'), a.k.a. the Sungnyemun (숭례문; lit. 'Honoring Propriety Gate'), is the southern gate of The Eight Gates of Seoul making part of the Seoul City Wall marking the city's original boundary during the Joseon period, although the city has since significantly outgrown it after that. It is located in Jung District between Seoul Station and Seoul Plaza, with the historic 24-hour Namdaemun Market next to the gate.

The gate, first built in the last year of King Taejo of Joseon's reign in 1398, is a historic pagoda-style gateway, and is designated as South Korea's first National Treasure. It was once one of the three major gateways through Seoul's city walls which had a stone circuit of 18.2 kilometres (11.3 mi) and stood up to 6.1 metres (20 ft) high. It was rebuilt in 1447.

Namdaemun was the oldest wooden structure in Seoul until 2008, when its wooden pagoda atop the gate was severely damaged by arson. Restoration work on the gateway started in February 2010 and was completed on 29 April 2013. The gate was reopened on 4 May 2013.

== Name ==
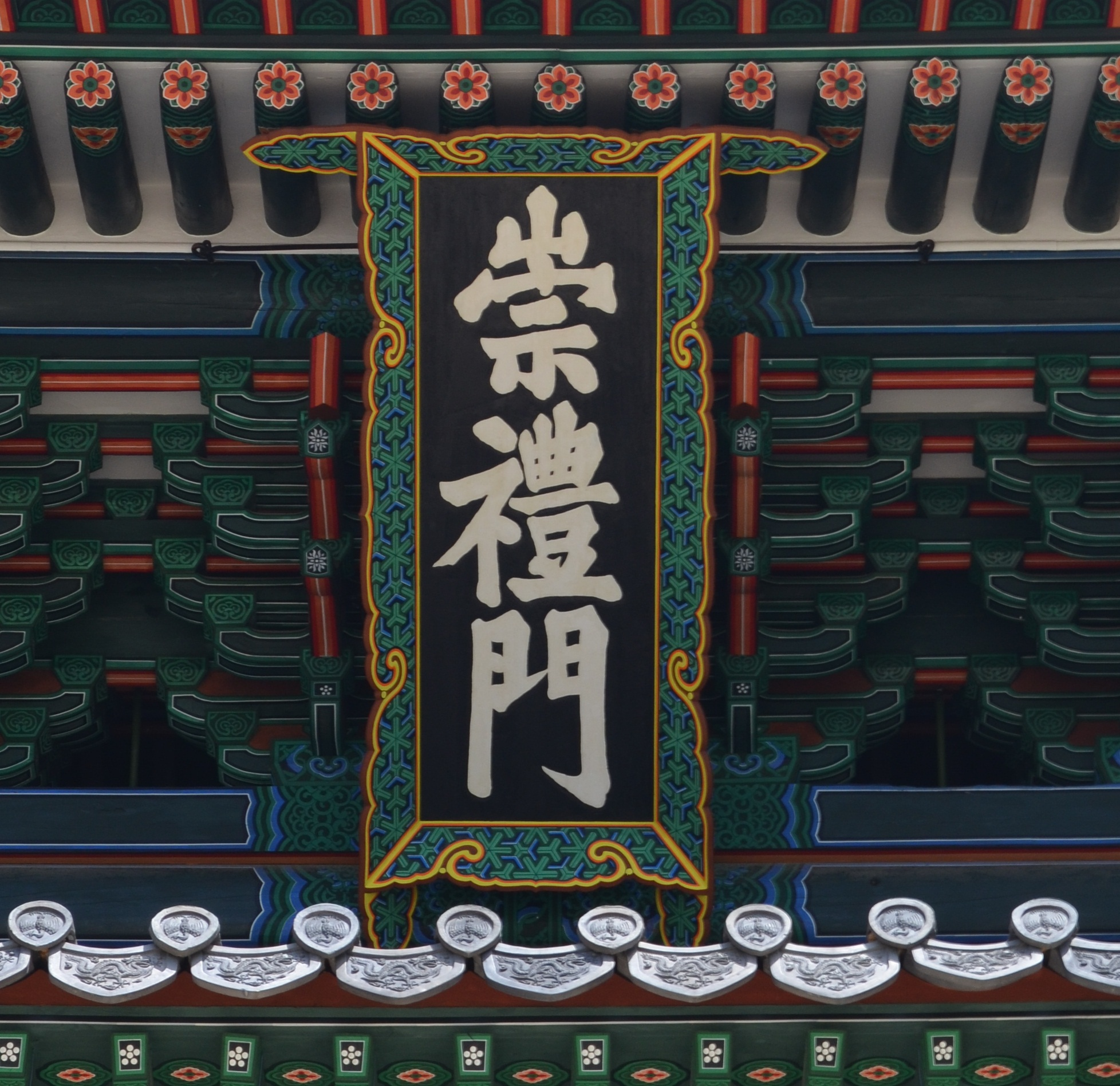
Plaque showing the official name of the gate, Sungnyemun, in Hanja

The gate was commonly known as Namdaemun since the Joseon period. When the first king of that period Yi Seonggye (from 1335 to 1408) constructed Seoul, he believed that the element fire would reach to Gyeongbok Palace, as well as to the capital city, as Mt. Gwanak nearby is shaped like fire according to feng shui principles. Sungnyemun's name means "fire", which is from the harmony of the Five Elements and, if written vertically, the Chinese character "fire" looks as if it is providing protection. The gate's sign was made by Taejong's (1367–1422) first son, Yangnyeongdaegun (1394–1462). "Sungnyemun" has also become the official name given by the South Korean government,

A common belief in Korea is that the name "Namdaemun" was imposed forcibly during the Japanese colonial period, and therefore should not be used. However, Joseon dynasty annals indicate that naming the eight gates of Seoul after their respective directions was common colloquial usage before the Japanese arrived.

== History ==
=== Before the 2008 fire ===
The city gate, made of wood and stone with a two-tiered, pagoda-shaped tiled roof, was completed in 1398 and originally used to greet foreign emissaries, control access to the capital city, and keep out Siberian tigers, which have long been gone from the area. Construction began in 1395 during the fourth year of the reign of King Taejo and was finished in 1398. The structure was rebuilt in 1447, during the 29th year of King Sejong's reign, and has been renovated several times since. It was originally one of three main gates, the others being Dongdaemun (East Gate) and the now-demolished Seodaemun (West Gate) in the Seodaemun District.

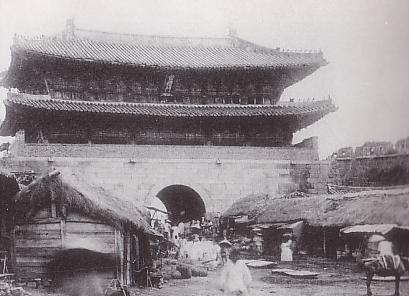
Namdaemun during the Joseon period (c. 1890s)

It is the location of the Battle of Namdaemun.

In the early part of the 20th century, the city walls that surrounded Seoul were demolished to make the traffic system more efficient. A visit to Seoul by the Crown Prince of Japan prompted the demolition of the walls around Namdaemun, as the prince was deemed to be too exalted to pass through the gateway. The gate was closed to the public in 1907 after the authority constructed an electric tramway nearby. In 1938, Namdaemun was designated as Korean Treasure No. 1 by the Governor-General of Korea.

Namdaemun was extensively damaged during the Korean War and was given its last major repair in 1961, with a completion ceremony held on 14 May 1963. It was given the status of "National Treasure No. 1" on 20 December 1962.

The gate was renovated again in 2005 with the building of a lawn around the gate, before being opened once again to the public with much fanfare on 3 March 2006. During the restoration, 182 pages of blueprints for the gate were made as a contingency against any emergencies which may damage the structure. Three years later, such an emergency arose.

=== 2008 fire ===
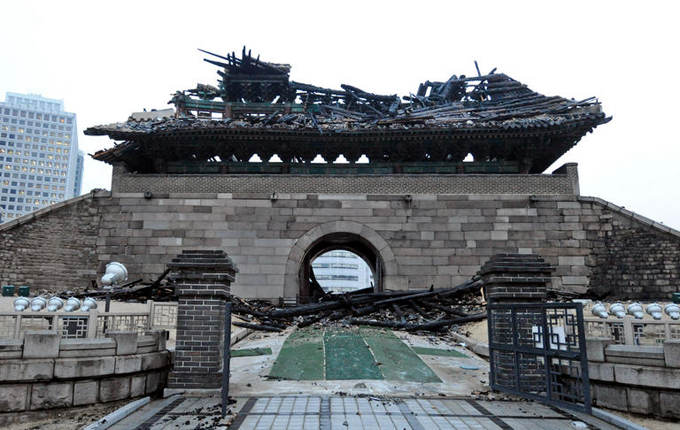
Aftermath of the fire (February 2008)

At approximately 8:50 p.m. on 10 February 2008, a fire broke out and severely damaged the wooden structure at the top of the Namdaemun gate. The fire roared out of control again after midnight and finally destroyed the structure, despite the efforts of more than 360 firefighters. Many witnesses reported seeing a suspicious man shortly before the fire, and two disposable lighters were found where the fire was believed to have started. A 69-year-old man identified as Chae Jong-gi was arrested on suspicion of arson and later confessed to the crime. A police captain reported that Chae had sprayed paint thinner on the floor of the structure and then set fire to it. Police say that Chae was upset about not being paid in full for land he had sold to developers. The same man had been charged with setting a fire at Changgyeonggung in Seoul in 2006. On 25 April 2008, Chae was convicted and sentenced to ten years' imprisonment by the Seoul Central District Court.

=== Restoration ===
The Cultural Heritage Administration of South Korea said that it would undertake a three-year project that would cost an estimated ₩20 billion (approximately $14 million) to rebuild and restore the historic gate, making it the most expensive restoration project in South Korea. President Lee Myung-bak proposed starting a private donation campaign to finance the restoration of the structure.

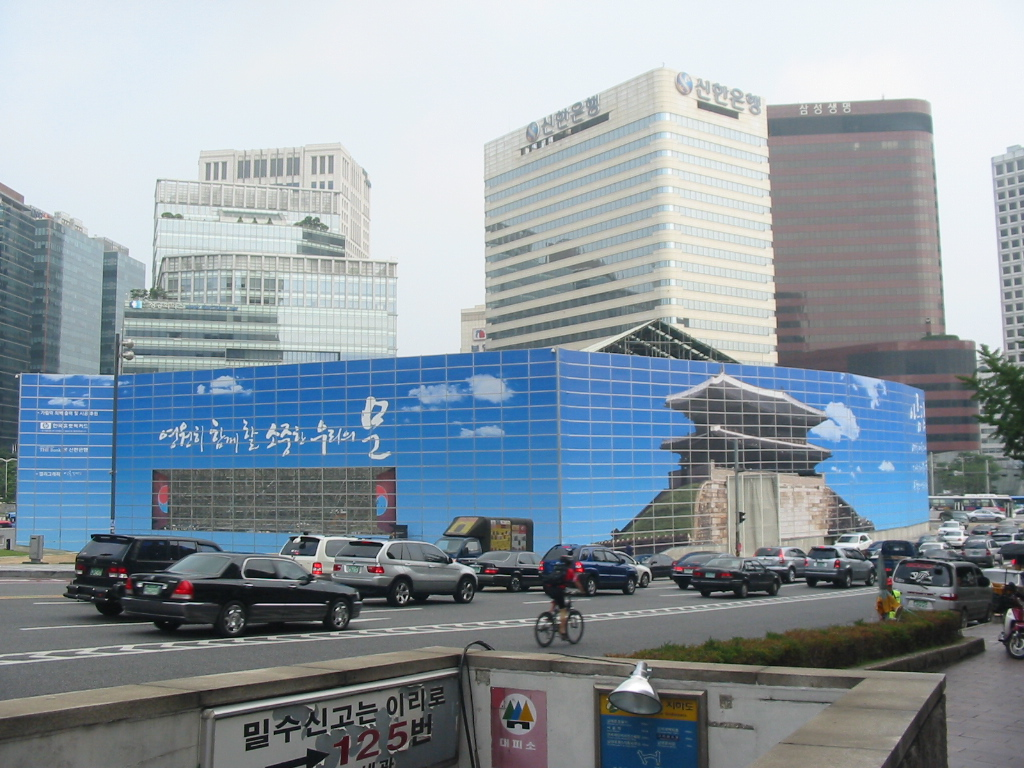
Restoration work in July 2008

By January 2010, 70% of the pavilion gate, the first floor and 80% of the fortress wall had been completed. Work on the roof began in April after the completion of the wooden second floor, with 22,000 roof tiles produced in a traditional kiln in Buyeo, South Chungcheong Province. The wall and basic frame were scheduled to be finished in April and May respectively. The pillars and rafters are to be elaborately decorated, with the ornamental patterns and colors based on those used in the large-scale repair in 1963, which was closest to the early-Chosun original.

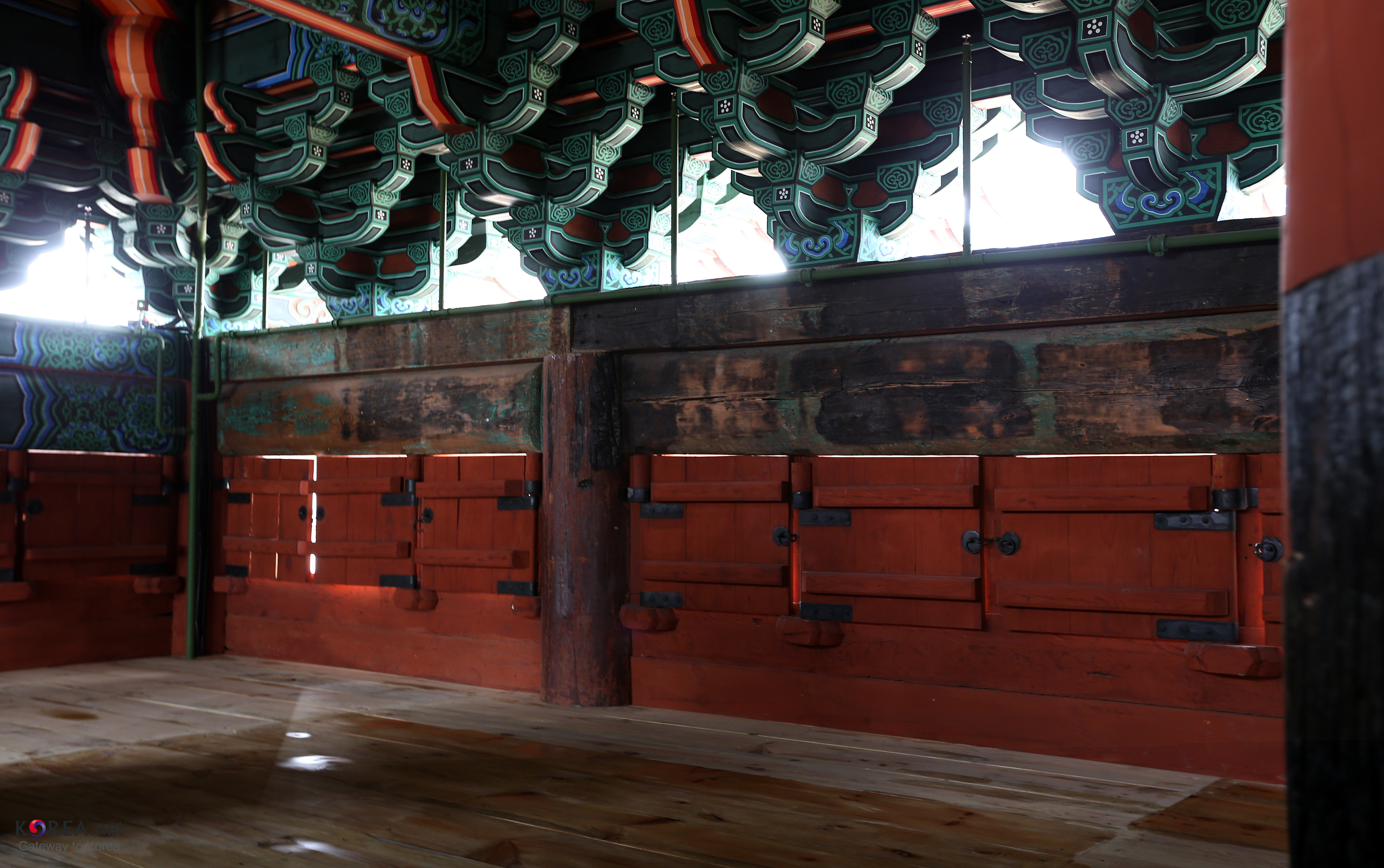
Interior of the wooden structure

In January 2013, it was estimated by an official that restoration of the gate would be completed around May 2013. Construction had been delayed by four months due to harsh weather conditions in Seoul. On 17 February 2013, the gate was 96% completed, and all steel-frame scaffolding had been removed. On 29 April 2013, restoration work was completed, and the public opening was scheduled for 4 May 2013, a day before Children's Day. It was officially reopened on 5 May 2013, after a five-year restoration period.

Only six months after the restoration was completed, paint started to chip off and wood cracked. President Park Geun-hye ordered an investigation into the matter.

== See also ==
- Seoul City Wall
- Namdaemun Market
- Shinhan Bank
- Deoksugung Palace
