= Souimun =

Old southwest gate of Seoul, South Korea

Coordinates: 37.5623°N 126.971745°E

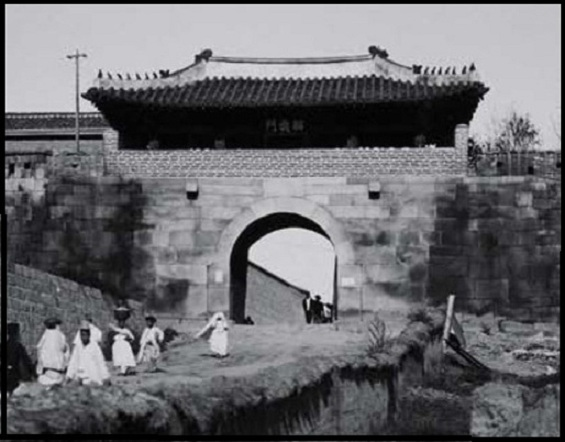

Korean name
- Hangul: 소의문
- Hanja: 昭義門
- RR: Souimun
- MR: Soŭimun

Souimun (Korean: 소의문; Hanja: 昭義門; lit. 'Promotion of Justice Gate'; also known as Southwest Gate) was one of the Eight Gates of Seoul in the Fortress Wall of Seoul, South Korea, which surrounded the city in the Joseon period. It was also known as Seosomun (서소문; lit. 'West Small Gate'). During the early years of Japanese occupation, the gate was demolished. The Seoul Metropolitan Government has placed a marker roughly where the gate once stood.

== History ==
Souimun was originally built in 1396. The Japanese authorities had the gate torn down in 1914 during their colonial rule of the country.

== Commemoration ==
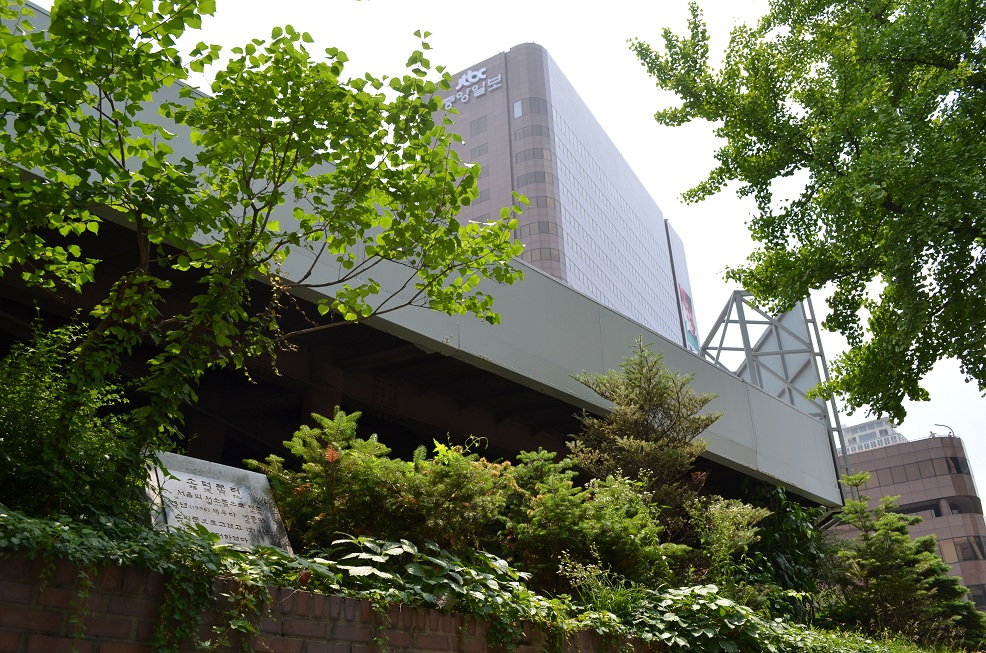
Souimun, Memorial marker, showing JoongAng Ilbo building in background.

A memorial marker has been erected near to where Souimun once stood. It is located next to a multi-storey car park structure, which is adjacent to the JoongAng Ilbo newspaper building on Seosomun-ro (street) in Jung District, Seoul.
