= Gwanghuimun =

Old southeast gate of Seoul, South Korea

Coordinates: 37°33′51.75″N 127°00′36.27″E

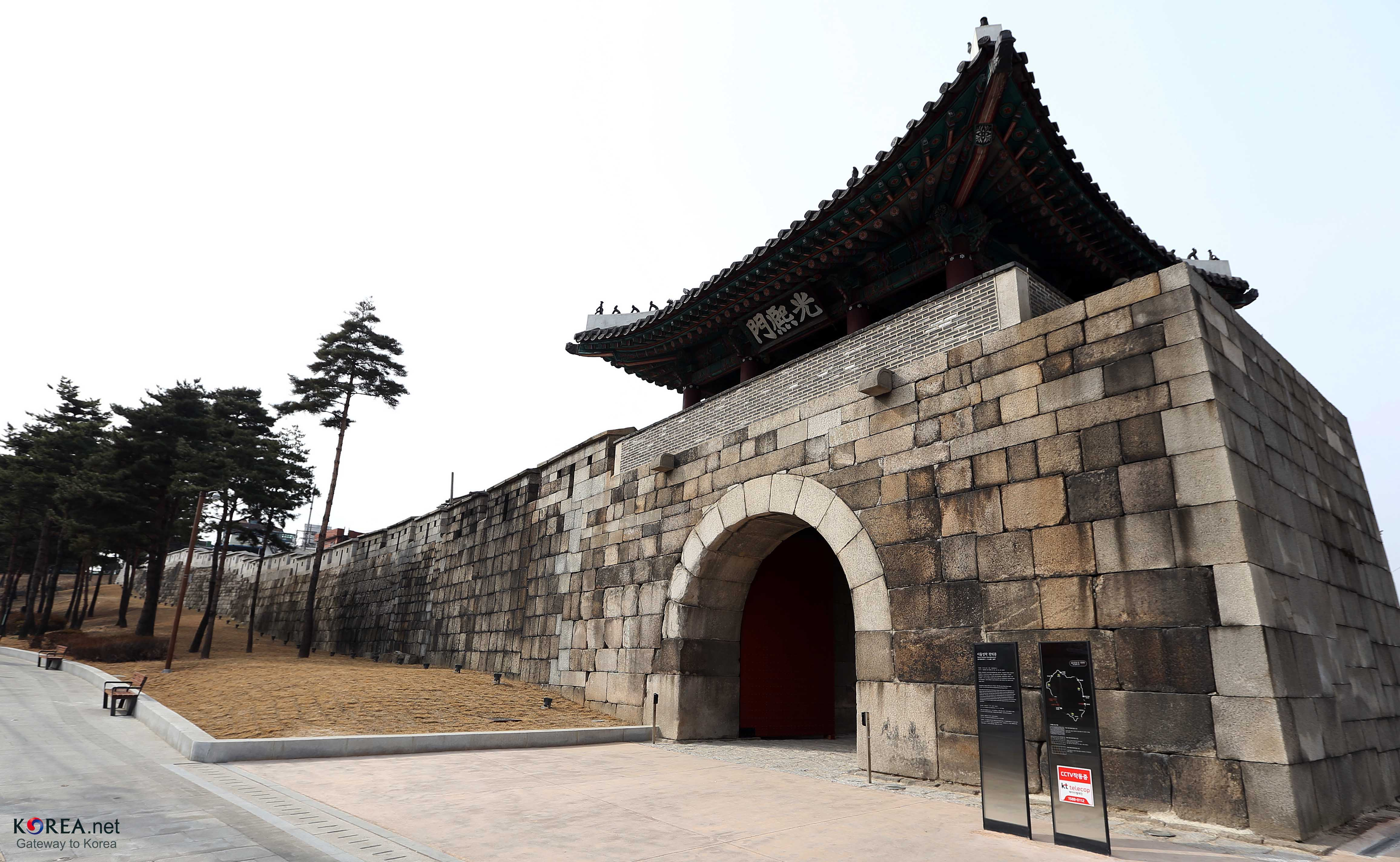
- Gwanghuimun, February 2014

Korean name
- Hangul: 광희문
- Hanja: 光熙門
- RR: Gwanghuimun
- MR: Kwanghŭimun

Gwanghuimun (Korean: 광희문; Hanja: 光熙門; lit. 'Bright Light Gate'; also known as Southeast Gate) is one of The Eight Gates of Seoul in the Fortress Wall of Seoul, South Korea, which surrounded the city in the Joseon period. The gate is also known as Namsomun (남소문; lit. 'South Small Gate'). It was originally called Sugumun (수구문; 水口門; lit. 'Water Channel Gate').

== History ==
Gwanghuimun was originally built in 1396, and was rebuilt from 1711 to 1719. It was the only gate to be left virtually untouched during the Japanese Occupation. However, it was largely destroyed during the Korean War, but was restored in 1976.

== Preservation ==
Gwanghuimun is located in Gwanghui-dong 2-ga, Jung District, Seoul, at the intersection of Geumhodong-gil and Toegye-ro. The current gate is located slightly further south than the original gate, due to road construction.

The gate can be easily accessed from the Dongdaemun History & Culture Park Station, which is located on both subway line 2 and subway line 4. It is located about 1/2 block south from subway line 2, exit 3; and about 2 1/2 blocks east from subway line 4, exit 4. Visitors to the gate today are not allowed access above the gate, but can go through the gate and circle the section of the Fortress Wall it is connected to.

== Gallery ==
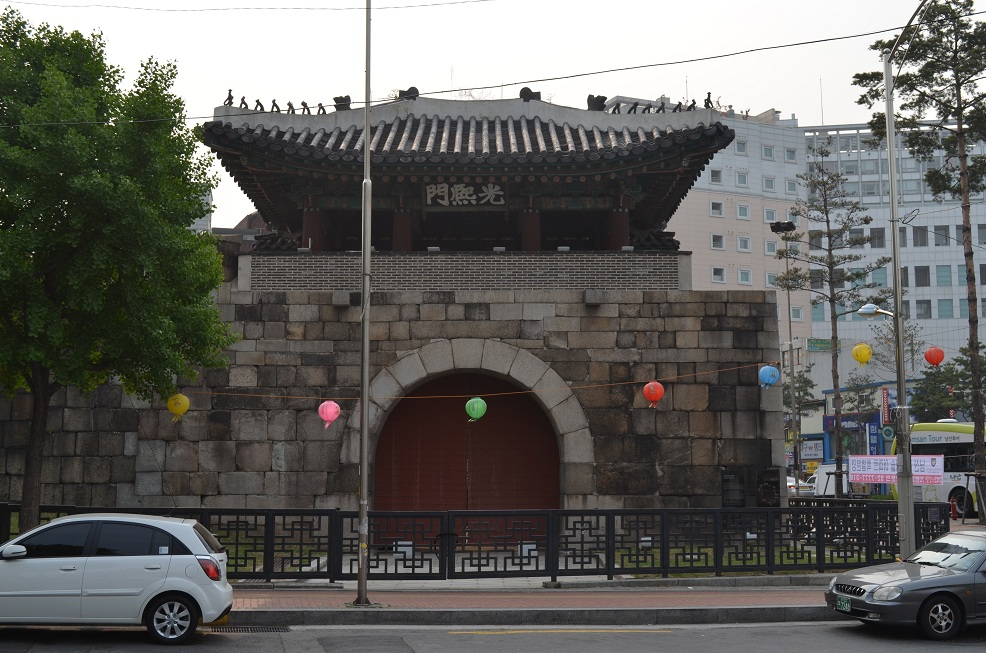
Gwanghuimun Gate, Seoul, Korea

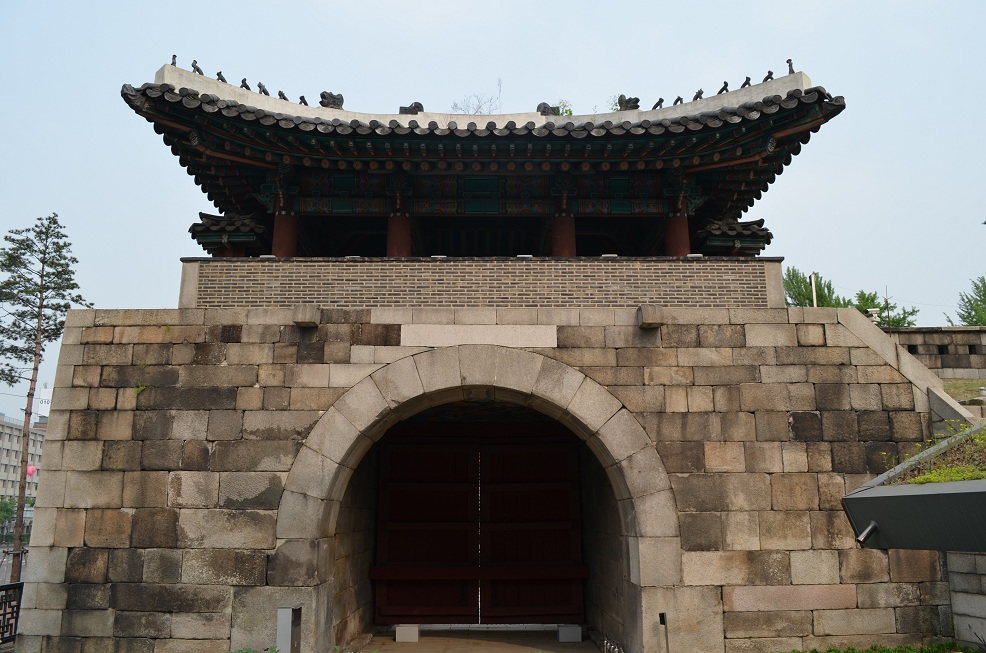
Gwanghuimun gate Back, Seoul, Korea

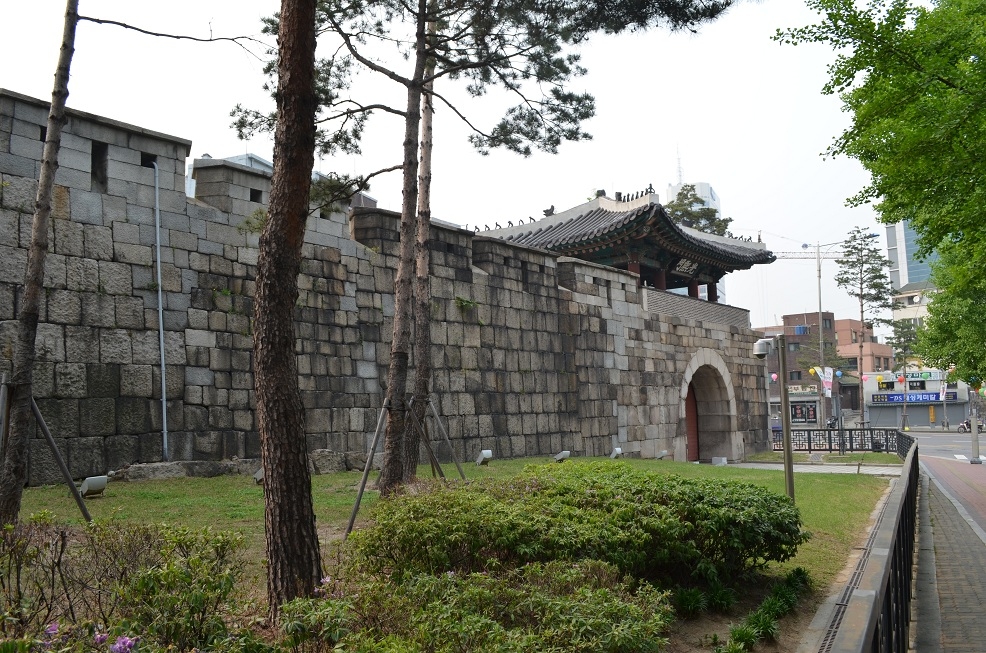
Gwanghuimun Gate, with Fortress Wall, Seoul, Korea

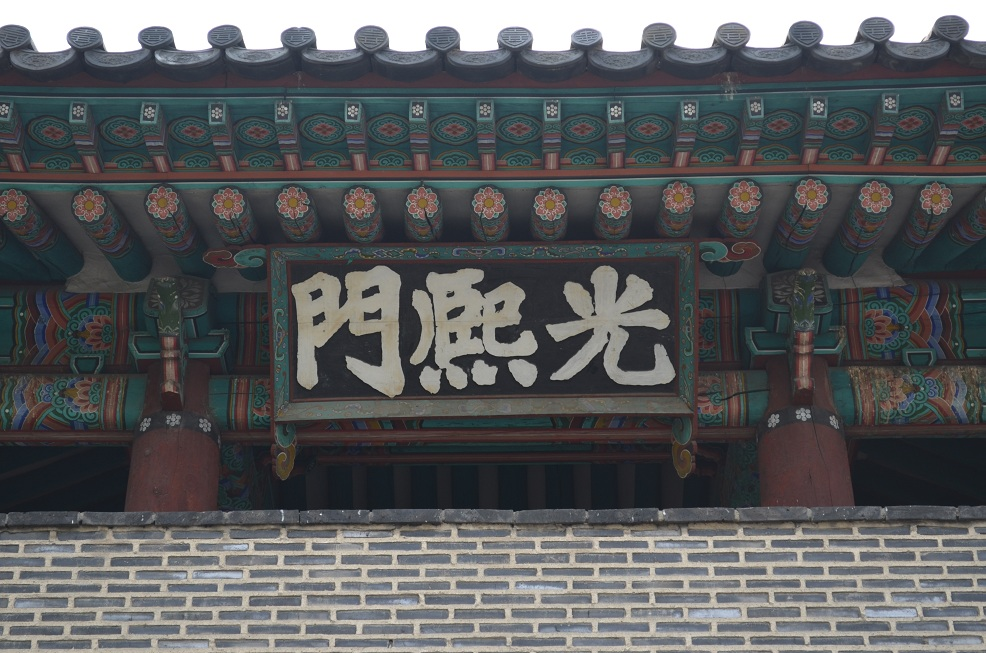
Gwanghuimun Signboard, Seoul, Korea

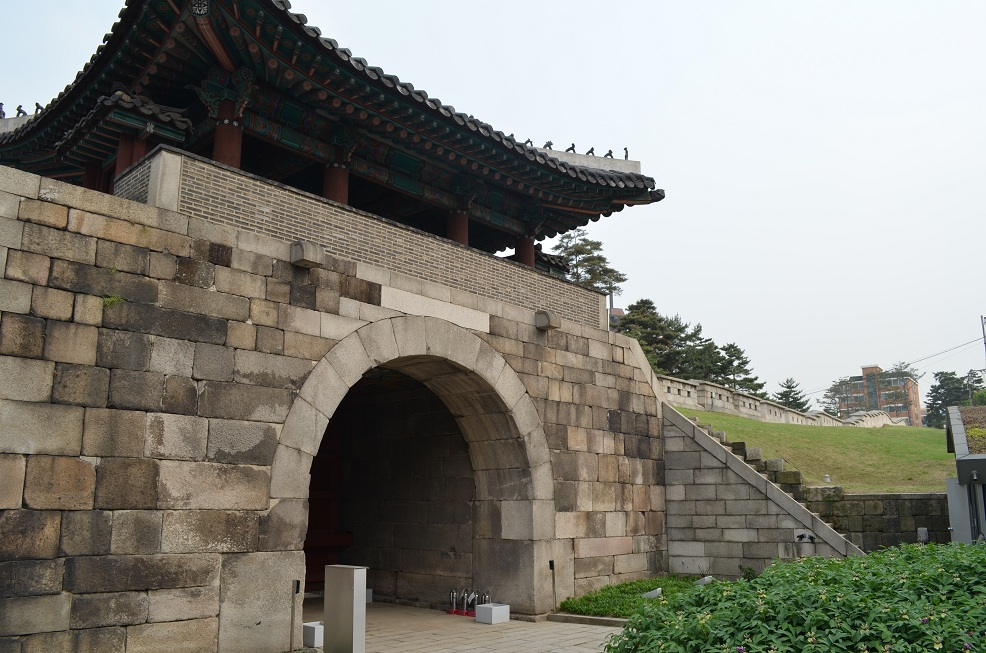
Gwanghuimun Gate, back with Fortress Wall, Seoul, Korea

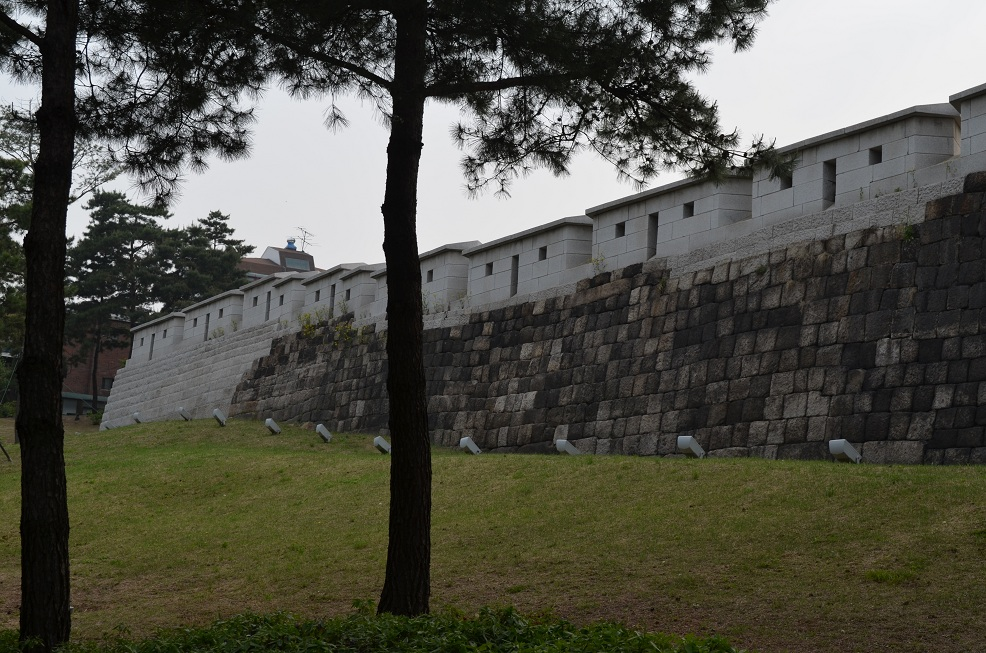
Gwanghuimun Gate, front, stonework of Fortress Wall, Seoul, Korea

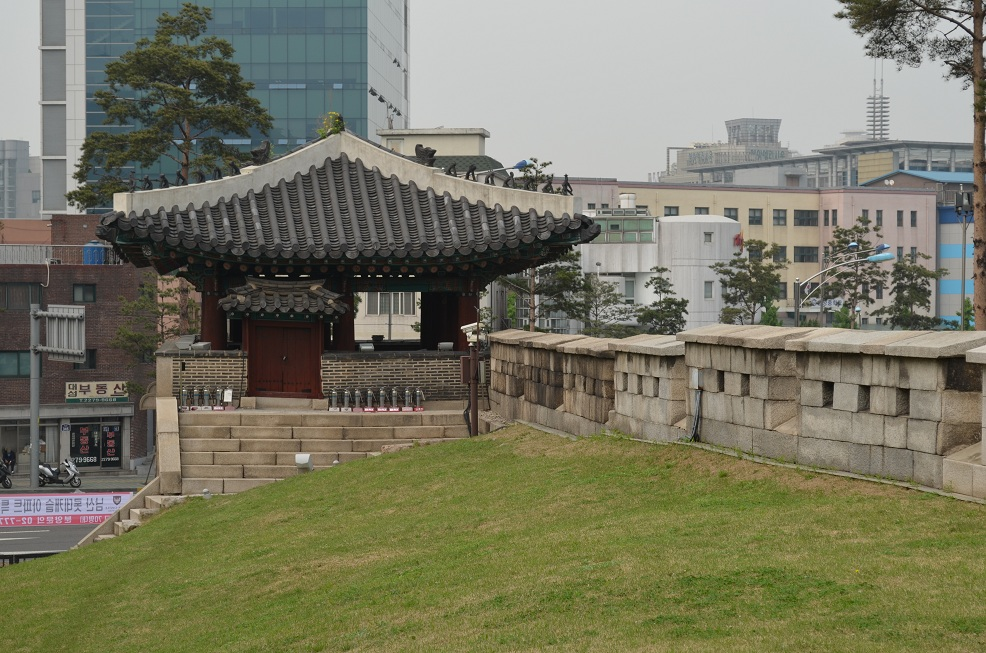
Gwanghuimun Gate, back stonework, Seoul, Korea

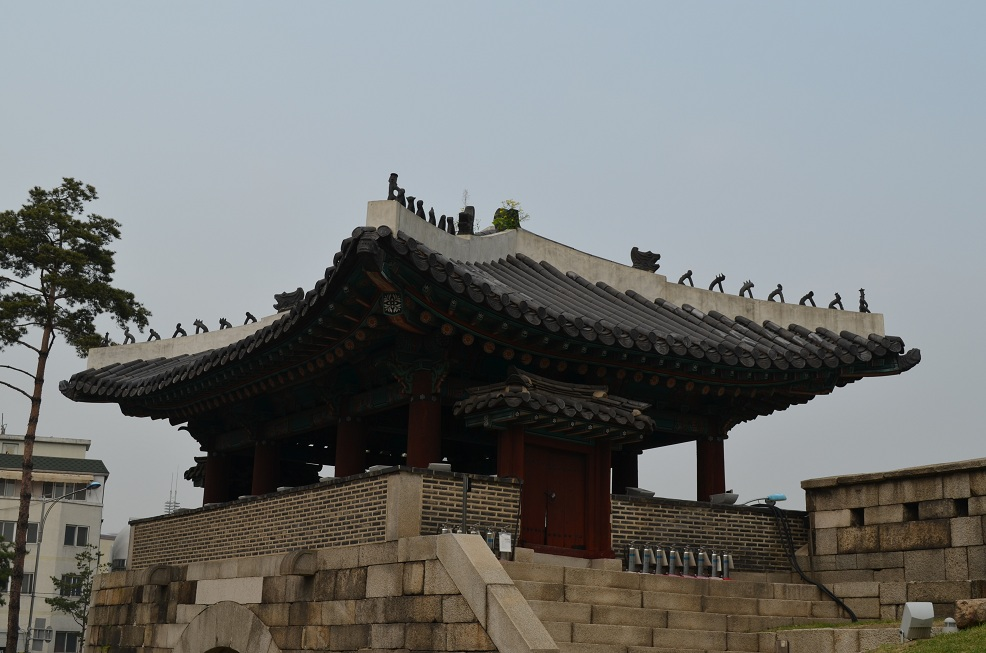
Gwanghuimun Gate, Gatehouse, Seoul, Korea

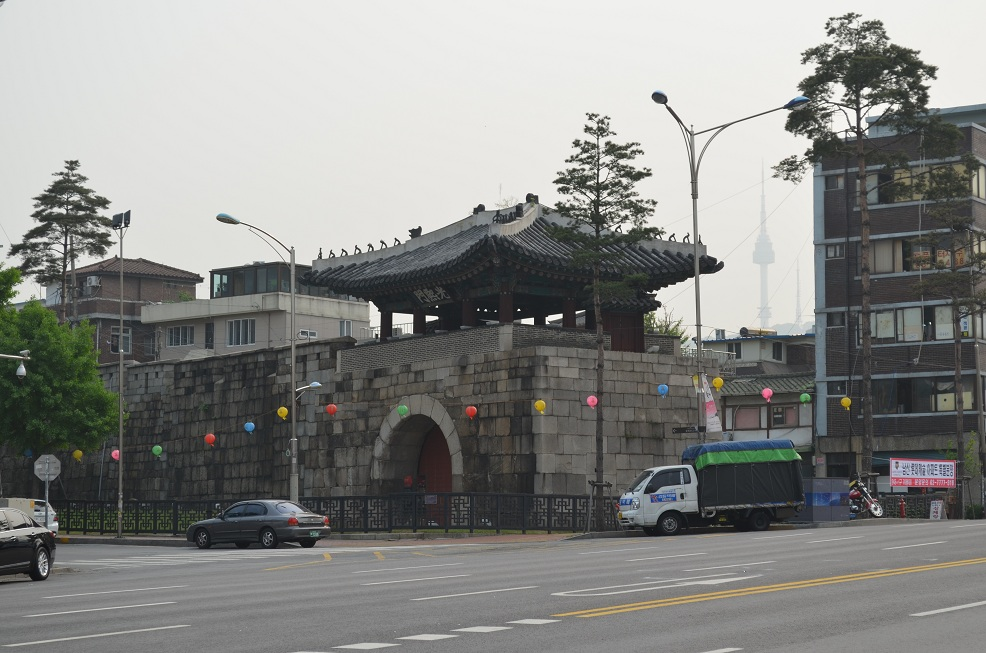
Gwanghuimun Gate, across street, Seoul, Korea
