= Potongmun =

West gate of Pyongyang, North Korea

Coordinates: 39°01′38″N 125°44′30″E

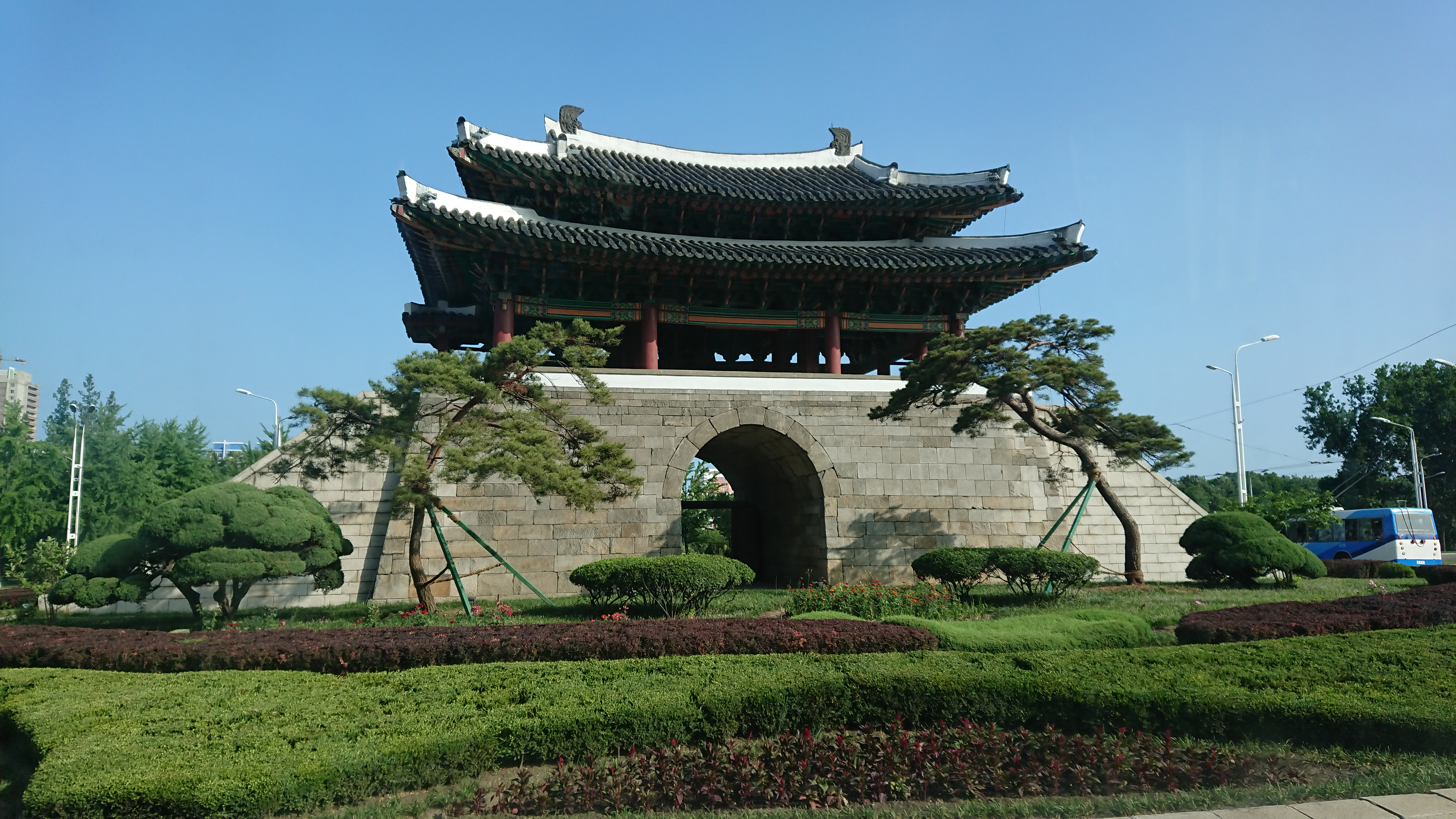
- The gate in 2019
- Interactive map of the Potongmun area

Korean name
- Hangul: 보통문
- Hanja: 普通門
- RR: Botongmun
- MR: Pot'ongmun

Potongmun (Korean: 보통문; lit. 'Potong Gate') is the western gate of the inner system of the walled city of Pyongyang (Pyongyang Castle). It was originally built in the sixth century as an official Koguryo construction, and was later rebuilt in 1473. It features a granite base topped by a two-story structure. The gate's structure was destroyed by American air attacks during the destruction of Pyongyang in Korean War, but was later reconstructed in 1955.

It is listed as National Treasures #3 in North Korea.

== See also ==
- Taedongmun
- National Treasures of North Korea
