= Buam-dong, Seoul =

Coordinates: 37.592°N 126.964°E

Buam-dong
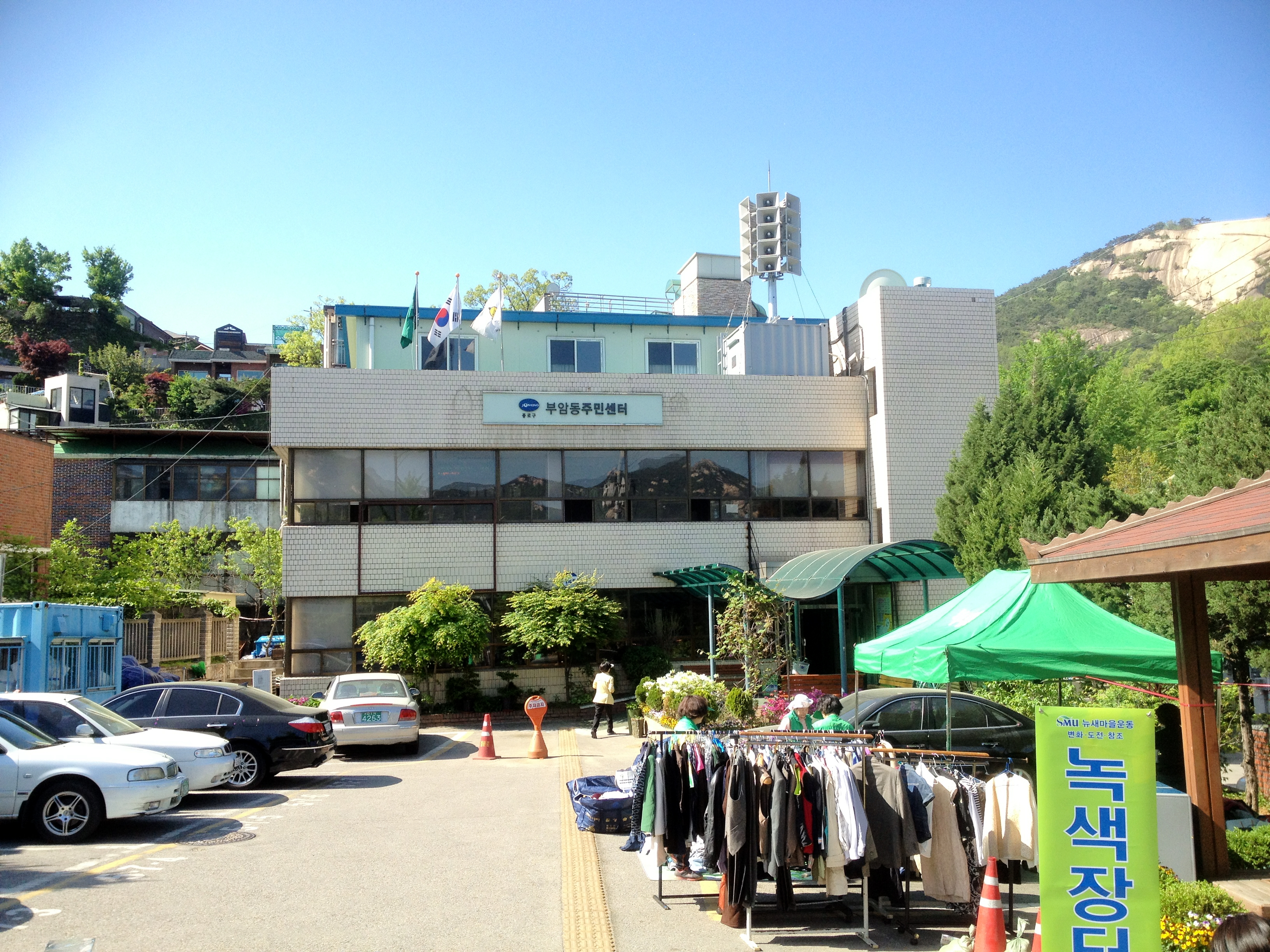
- Buam-dong Community Service Center
- Interactive map of Buam-dong
- Country: South Korea

Area
  - Total: 2.27 km^{2} (0.88 sq mi)

Population (2024)
  - Total: 9,051
  - Density: 3,990/km^{2} (10,300/sq mi)

Korean name
- Hangul: 부암동
- Hanja: 付岩洞
- RR: Buam-dong
- MR: Puam-dong

Buam-dong (Korean: 부암동) is a dong (neighborhood) of Jongno District, Seoul, South Korea.

== Attraction ==
A bronze statue of Choi Gyu-sik (최규식) is on Jaha Gate (Changuimun) hill near the Buam-dong residential service office. Choi was a chief of the Jongno police station who was killed in the line of duty during the 21 January Incident when North Korean spies tried to penetrate Cheong Wa Dae, South Korean presidential office and residence in 1968.

Another attraction to Buam-dong is the Changuimun Gate, otherwise known as the Northwest Gate of the Fortress Wall of Seoul. Changuimun is one of the Eight Gates of Seoul; its gatehouse is the oldest among the "Four Small Gates" (사소문).

The area is home to a store founded in 1969, Dongyang Bangagan, that sells tteok, traditional rice cakes. It grinds rice to make them at home and sells many varieties, as well as seasonal specialties.

== See also ==
- Administrative divisions of South Korea
