= Hyehwamun =

Old northeast gate of Seoul, South Korea

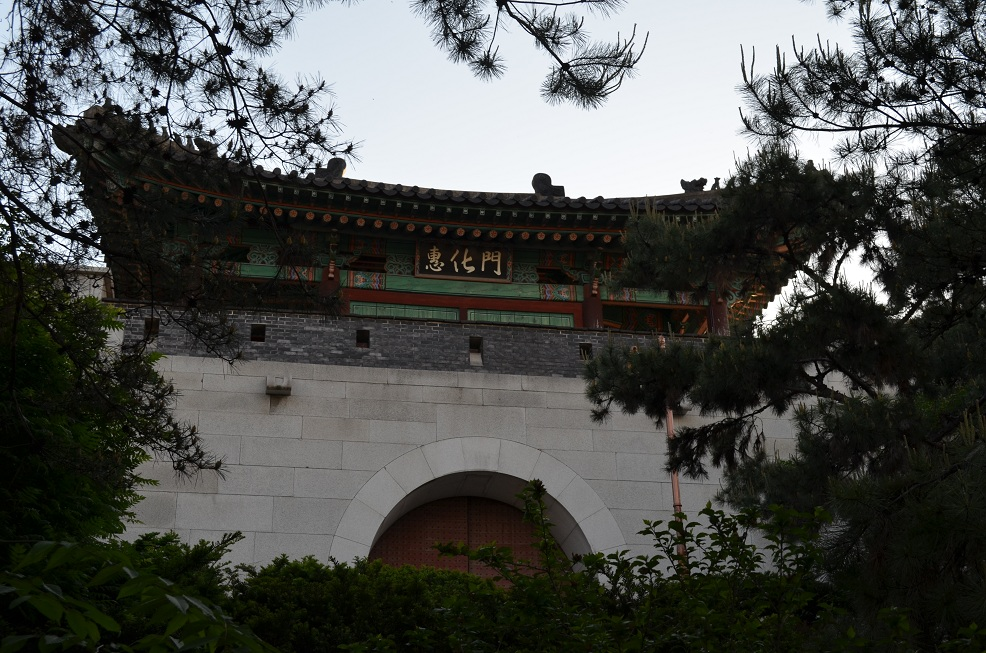
- Front of Hyehwamun, viewed from the east, May 2012
- Interactive map of the Hyehwamun area

General information
- Type: Gate
- Location: Seoul, South Korea
- Coordinates: 37°35′16.58″N 127°00′14.16″E
- Year built: 1396, 1992 (rebuilt)

Korean name
- Hangul: 혜화문
- Hanja: 惠化門
- RR: Hyehwamun
- MR: Hyehwamun

Hyehwamun (Korean: 혜화문), also known as Northeast Gate, is one of the Eight Gates of Seoul in the Fortress Wall of Seoul, South Korea, which surrounded the city in the Joseon period. The gate is also known as Dongsomun (동소문; lit. 'East Small Gate').

The gate was originally called Honghwamun (홍화문; 弘化門).

== History ==
Hyehwamun was originally built in 1396, and was originally called Honghwamun. But this name came into conflict with the east gate of Changgyeonggung Palace, built in 1483. So in 1511, the name was changed to its current name. The gate's wooden gatehouse, constructed either in 1684 or 1744, was brought down in 1928, leaving only the stone archway standing. Later in the Japanese colonial period, the entire gate was brought down to make room for a street car line linking Hyehwa-dong and Donam-dong. The gate was rebuilt in 1992, slightly further north than the site of the previous gate. The name Hyehwamun means literally "Distribution of Wisdom Gate." It is one of the Four Small Gates (사소문) in the Fortress Wall of Seoul. Since the gate to the north, it was an important gate for people to move toward the north of the country.

== Preservation ==
Hyehwamun is located along a busy street (Dongsomun-ro, 동소문로). The gate is incorporated into the Fortress Wall to its north. Immediately to its south is the street, but then the Fortress Wall continues on the other side of the street, running all the way down to the East Gate, Heunginjimun. Visitors to the gate today are allowed access to the front and the back of the gate, and under the gate itself. Visitors may also carefully view the wooden gatehouse above the gate, but are not allowed inside, and should not approach too closely due to a laser alarm system (July 2012).

The gate can be accessed via subway line 4, from either Hyehwa Station exit 4, or Hansung University Station exit 5. Hansung University Station is the closer of the two, being only about 1.5 city blocks from the gate.

Visitors can find it via Sajik Tunnel, Inwangsan (Mt. Inwang), Bukaksan (Mt. Bukak), Changdeokgung Palace, and Sungkyunkwan University. It intersects with the road toward Uijeongbu. People can see Bukaksan and Bukak Pavilion to the west of Hyehwamun Gate.

== Images ==
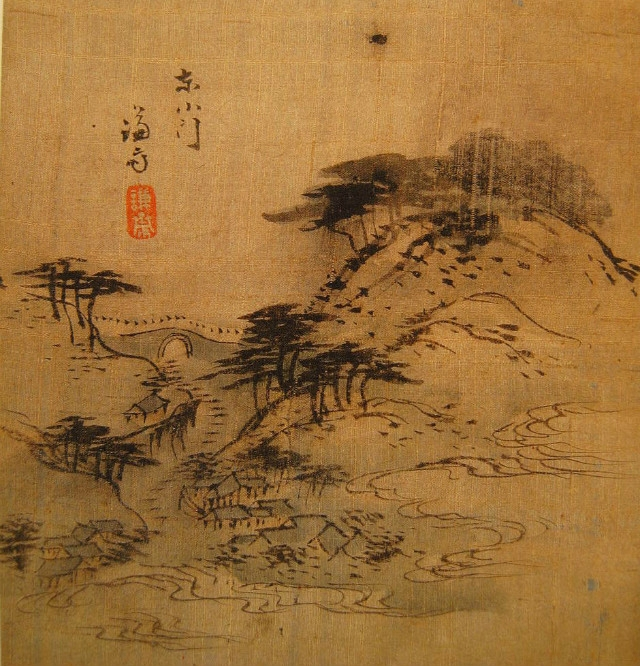
17th century painting of the gate

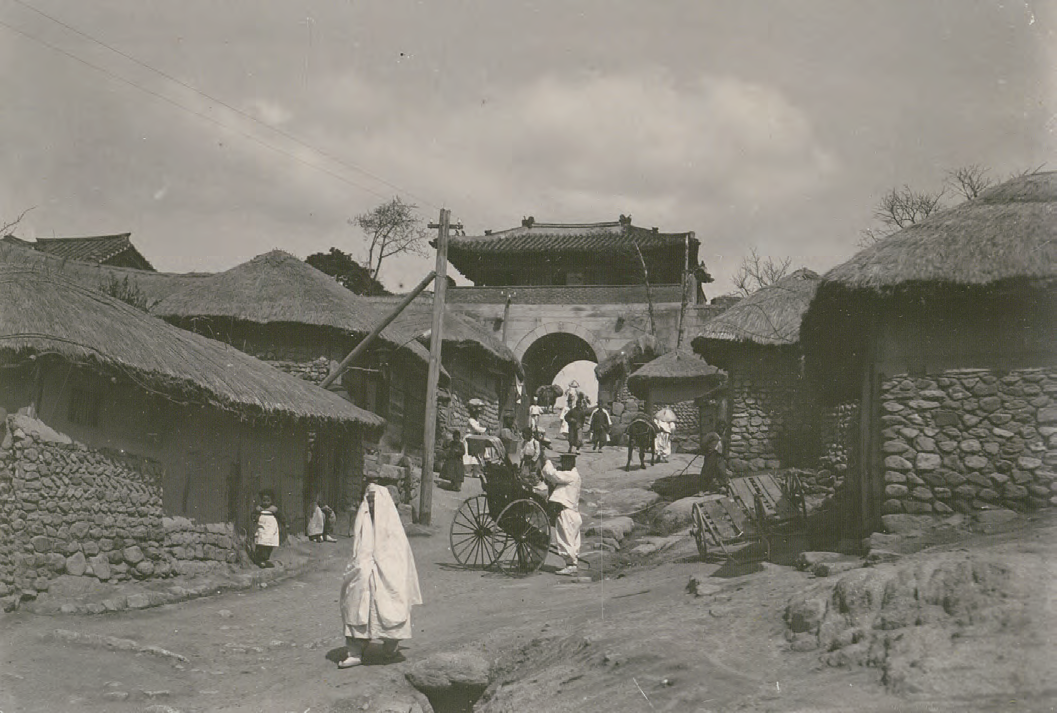
Just inside the gate (c. 1910)

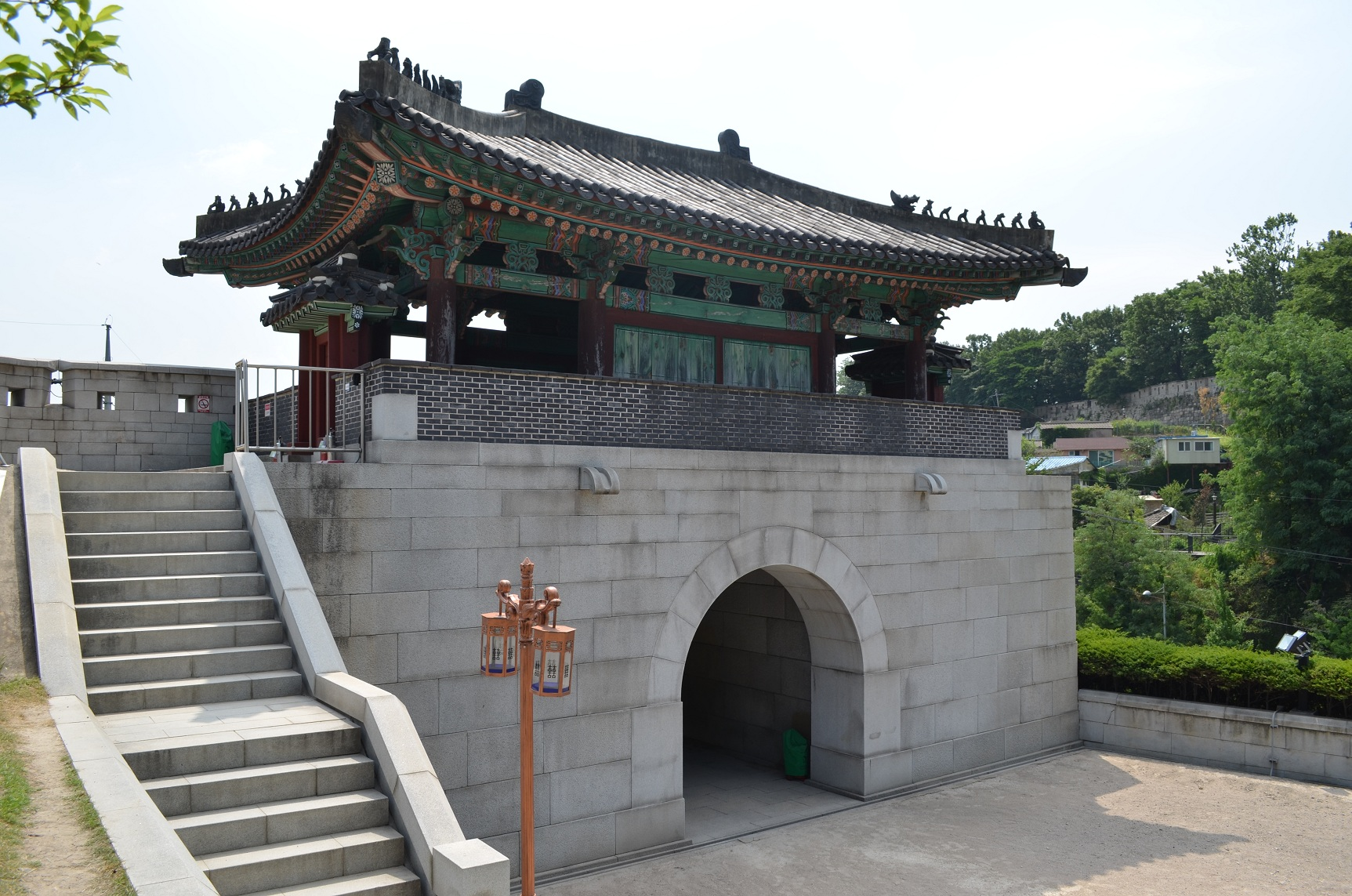
Rear (2012)

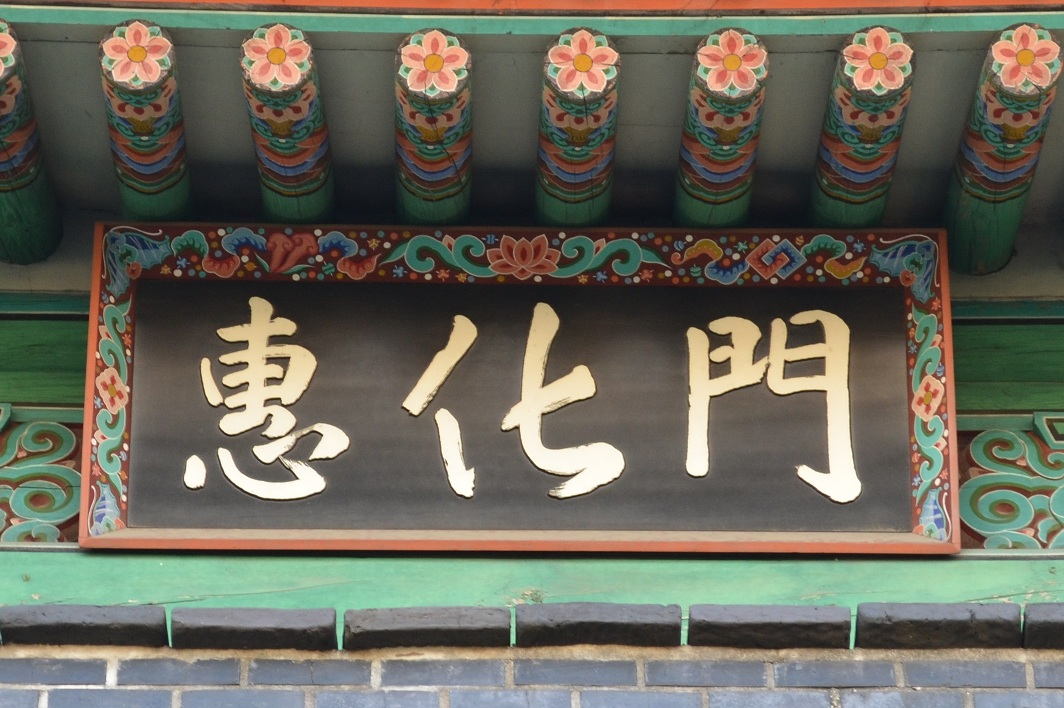
Signboard of gate, viewed from east. Name of gate, written from left to right. (2012)

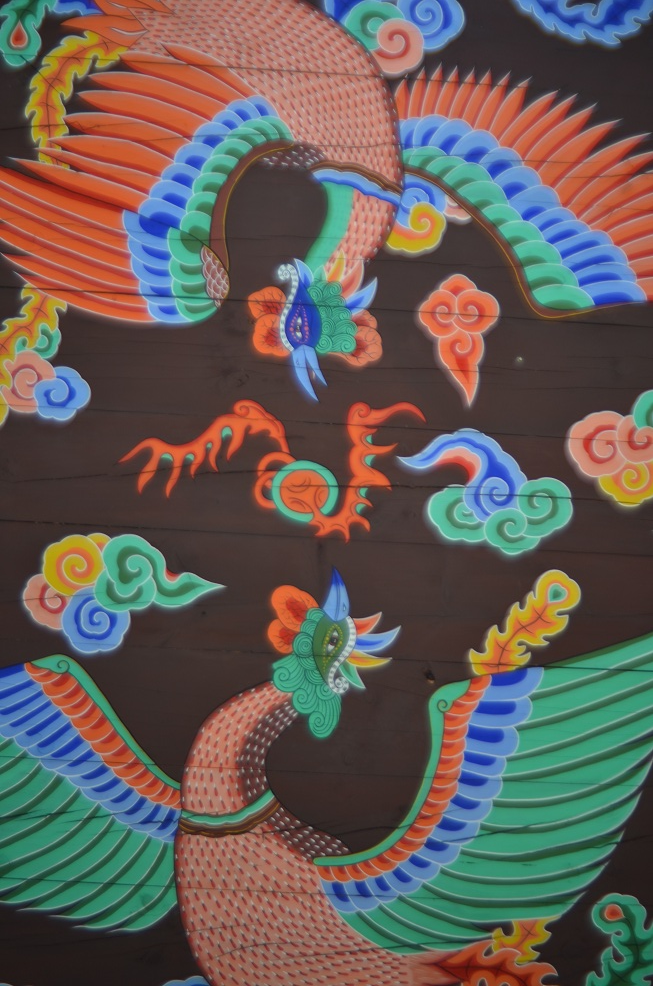
Detail of wooden roof decoration inside gate (2012)

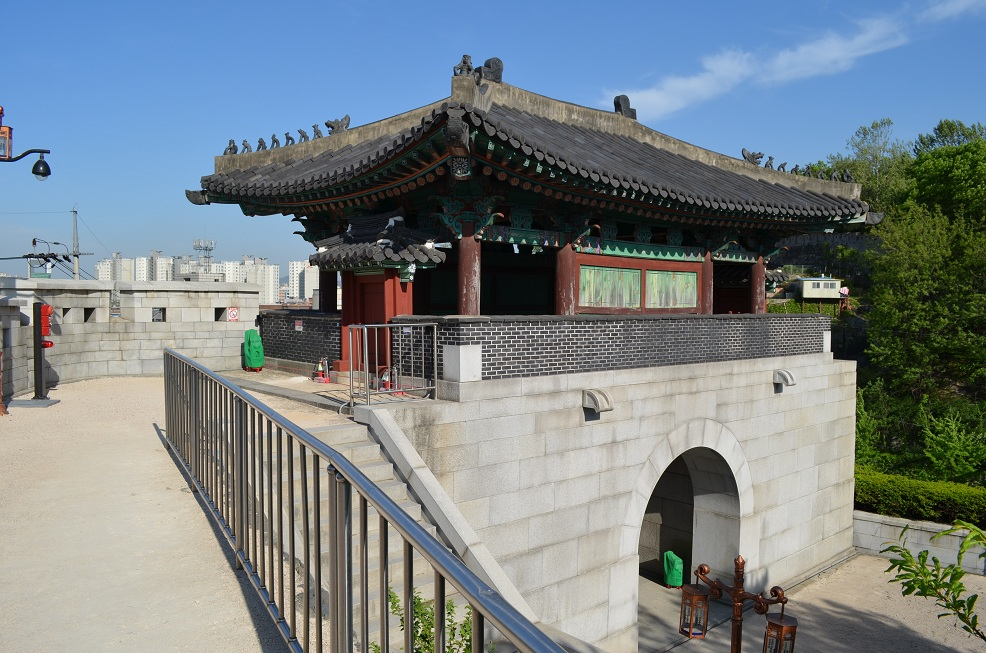
From rear, showing upper gatehouse (2012)

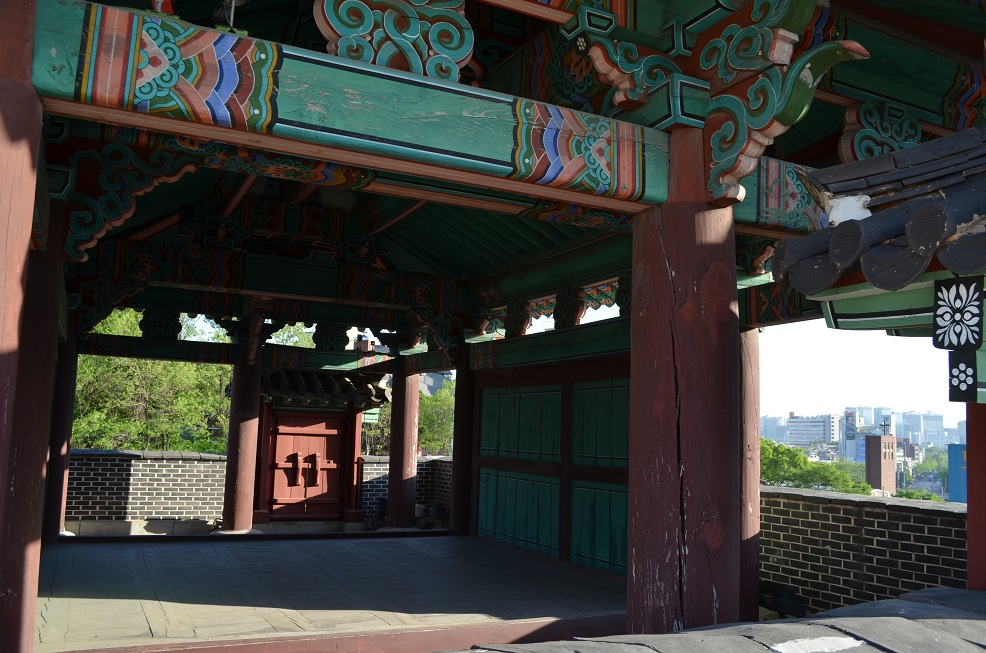
Interior of gatehouse above gate, with city in background (2012)
