= 2008 Namdaemun fire =

Arson attack in Seoul, South Korea

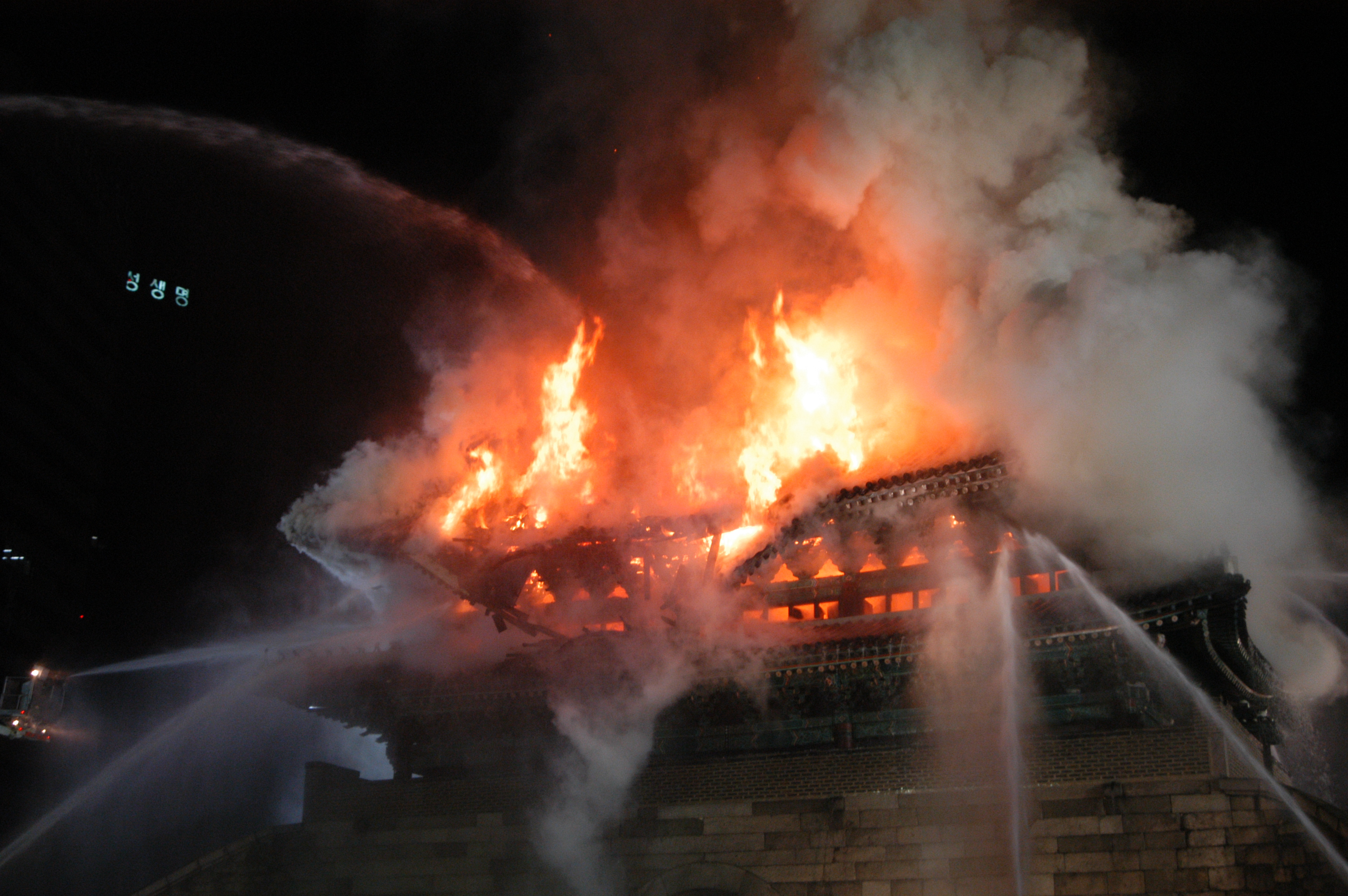
- Namdaemun on fire
- Date: February 10, 2008
- Time: 8:50 p.m
- Location: Seoul, South Korea; 37°33′36″N 126°58′31″E
- Cause: Arson
- Outcome: Extinguished, no casualties reported

On February 10, 2008, an arsonist set fire to the historic Namdaemun gate (officially "Sungnyemun") in Seoul, South Korea, causing severe damage to the 550-year-old structure. The monument was restored and reopened to the public in 2013.

== Fire ==
The fire reportedly broke out at approximately 8:50 p.m. on February 10, 2008. Firefighters soon arrived on the scene and started dousing the blaze with water in an attempt to extinguish the fire. Initially, the effort seemed successful: by the latter part of the day, firefighters said they believed that they had contained the fire, with only minimal damage done to the wooden structure topping the otherwise stone structure. According to reports, they had been instructed by authorities not to be aggressive in fighting the fire out of fear that the structure would be damaged by the high-pressure water.

After midnight, however, the dying fire suddenly reignited, quickly getting out of control. Despite the efforts of the more than 360 firefighters who were at the scene, the fire soon ended up destroying the entire wooden structure and causing substantial damage to the stone walls. The fire did not result in any injuries.

== Arsonist ==
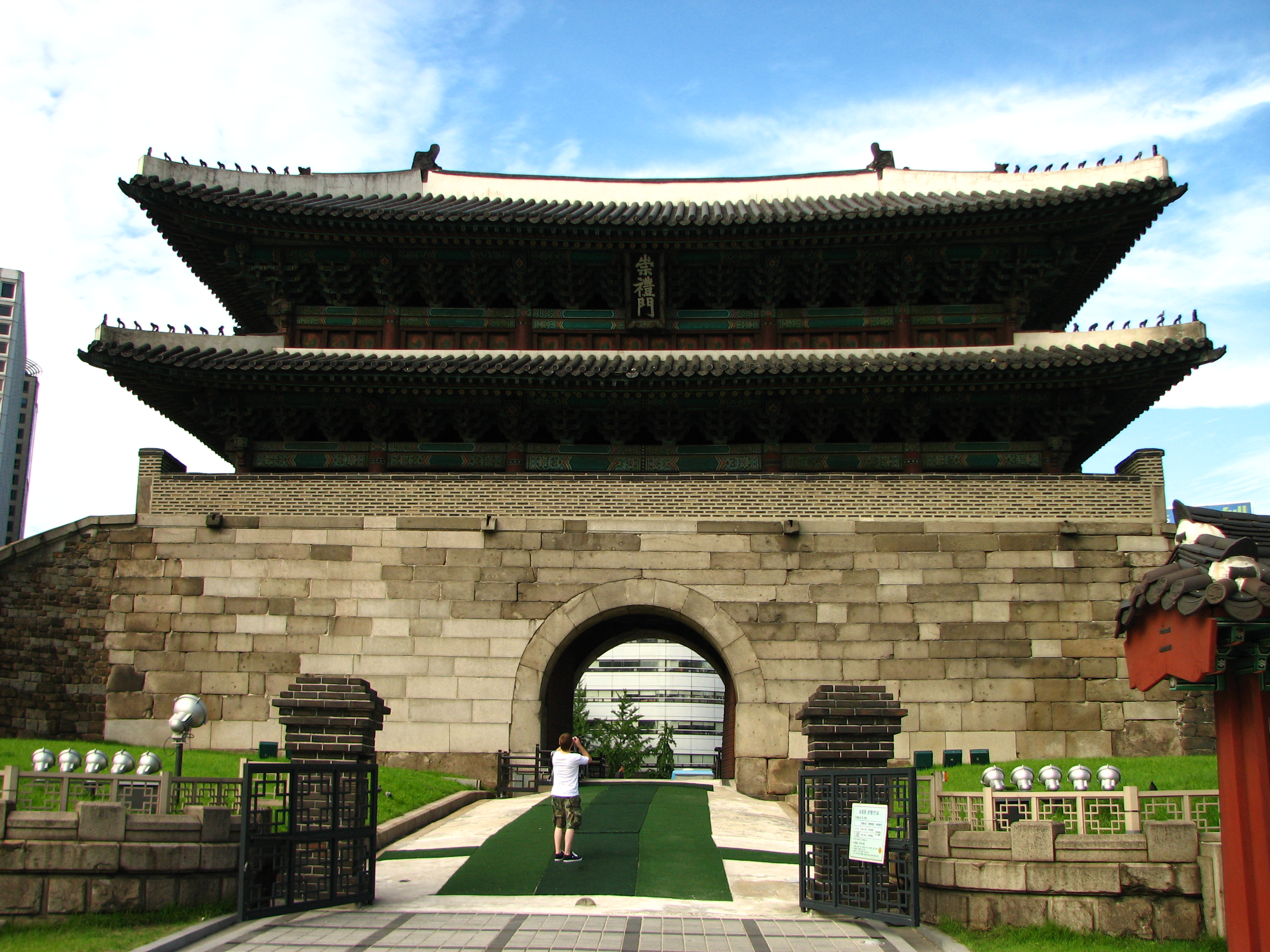
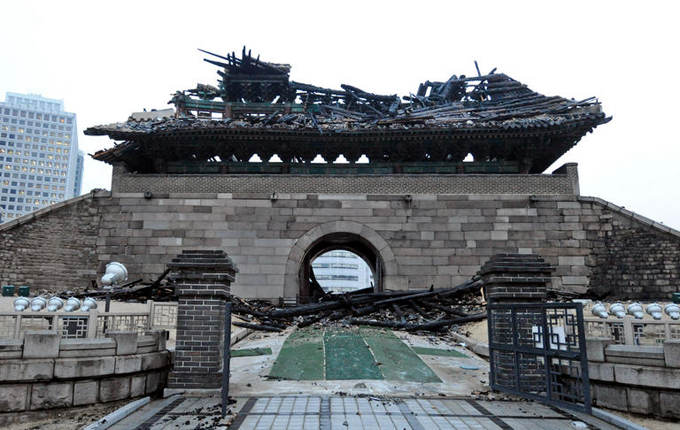
Namdaemun before the fire (left) and after

Originally, the fire had been suspected to be accidental. However, many witnesses reported seeing someone enter the gate shortly before the fire, and two disposable lighters were found where the fire was believed to have started.

Later investigations revealed that the fire was indeed an act of arson. A 69-year-old man, identified as Chae Jong-gi (Korean: 채종기; Hanja: 蔡宗基), was taken into police custody on February 12, on the suspicion that he started the fire. Chae confessed to the crime 30 minutes after his arrest. According to police reports, Chae arrived at Namdaemun around 8:35 p.m. carrying an aluminum ladder, three 1.5-liter bottles of paint thinner, and two cigarette lighters. With the ladder, he climbed the western wall of the gate, entered the gate, and walked up to the second floor. There, he started the fire by sprinkling the floor with paint thinner and lighting it. Chae stated that he had started the fire because he was upset about not having been paid in full for land he had sold to developers. Chae had also been charged with setting fire to the Changgyeonggung palace complex in Seoul in 2006.

The reason he targeted Namdaemun was because it was easily accessible and was only secured by motion sensors. He also considered attacking trains or buses, but decided against it due to the high number of casualties this would cause.

On April 25, 2008, Chae was convicted and sentenced to ten years imprisonment by the Seoul Central District Court.

== Aftermath ==
South Korean newspapers blamed the government for failing to provide more security.

The Cultural Heritage Administration of South Korea stated that it would take three years and $21 million to rebuild and restore the historic gate. In 2006, 182 pages of blueprints of the gate had been made as a contingency measure against possible damages, making reconstruction possible.

President Lee Myung-bak proposed starting a private donation campaign to finance the restoration of the gate. Many people felt that the government should pay for the restoration because it had failed to adequately protect the structure. Lee's transitional committee clarified the president-elect's comments by stating that the government would pay for the majority of the restoration.

The restored gate reopened to the public on May 5, 2013, having been rebuilt using traditional tools and techniques. The project cost 25 billion won to complete and includes new fire suppression systems and closed-circuit television cameras.

== See also ==
- Daegu subway fire
