= Seodaemun =

1396–1915 west gate of Seoul, South Korea

Coordinates: 37°34′05.68″N 126°58′08.31″E

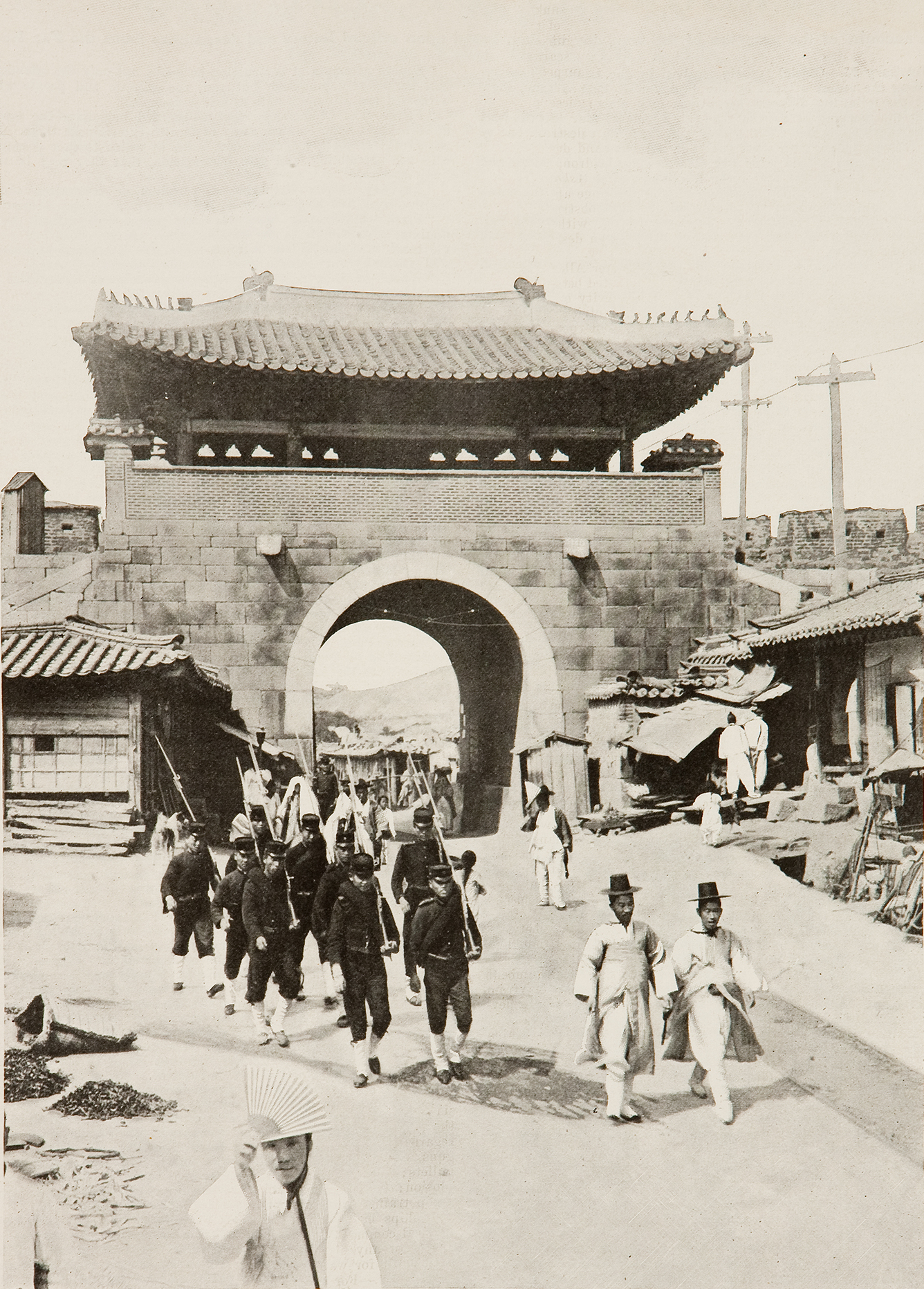
- Donuimun, as photographed in 1904 by Horace Grant Underwood "...Japanese troops entering the city of Seoul..."

Korean name
- Hangul: 서대문; 돈의문
- Hanja: 西大門; 敦義門
- RR: Seodaemun; Donuimun
- MR: Sŏdaemun; Tonŭimun

Donuimun (Korean: 돈의문; lit. 'Loyalty Gate'), sometimes called the West Gate or Seodaemun (서대문; 西大門; lit. 'West Big Gate'), was one of the Eight Gates of Seoul in Seoul, South Korea. The gate served as the western opening to the Fortress Wall that surrounded the city during the Joseon period.

It was originally built in 1396, destroyed during the 16th century, and then rebuilt in 1711. However, it was again destroyed in 1915, during the Japanese occupation of Korea, and has not since been rebuilt.

== History ==
Donuimun was originally built in 1396. It was burned as a result of the 16th century invasions by Japan, but was rebuilt in 1711. In 1413, the gate was closed. In 1422, Donuimun gate was repaired. Donuimun Gate was rebuilt in 1711. In 1915, the gate was again destroyed during the Japanese colonial period. The gate was photographed at various times before its destruction, most notably in a series of photographs taken by Presbyterian missionary Horace Grant Underwood in 1904. Some of these photographs show the tracks of an "American Electric Tramway" running through the gate.

The name Donuimun means literally "Loyalty Gate." It was one of the Four Great Gates in the Fortress Wall of Seoul.

== Preservation ==
Donuimun was demolished in 1915, during Japanese rule of Korea, in order to facilitate the construction of a tram line. In 2009, Seoul Metropolitan Government announced plans to rebuild Donuimun, using maps from the Joseon era to the present day, in addition to conducting surveys and excavations.

Officials originally envision the project to be complete by 2013, but was delayed to 2022, due to budget issues.

Currently, an art piece titled "Invisible Gate" stands over the Donuimun site.

== Images ==
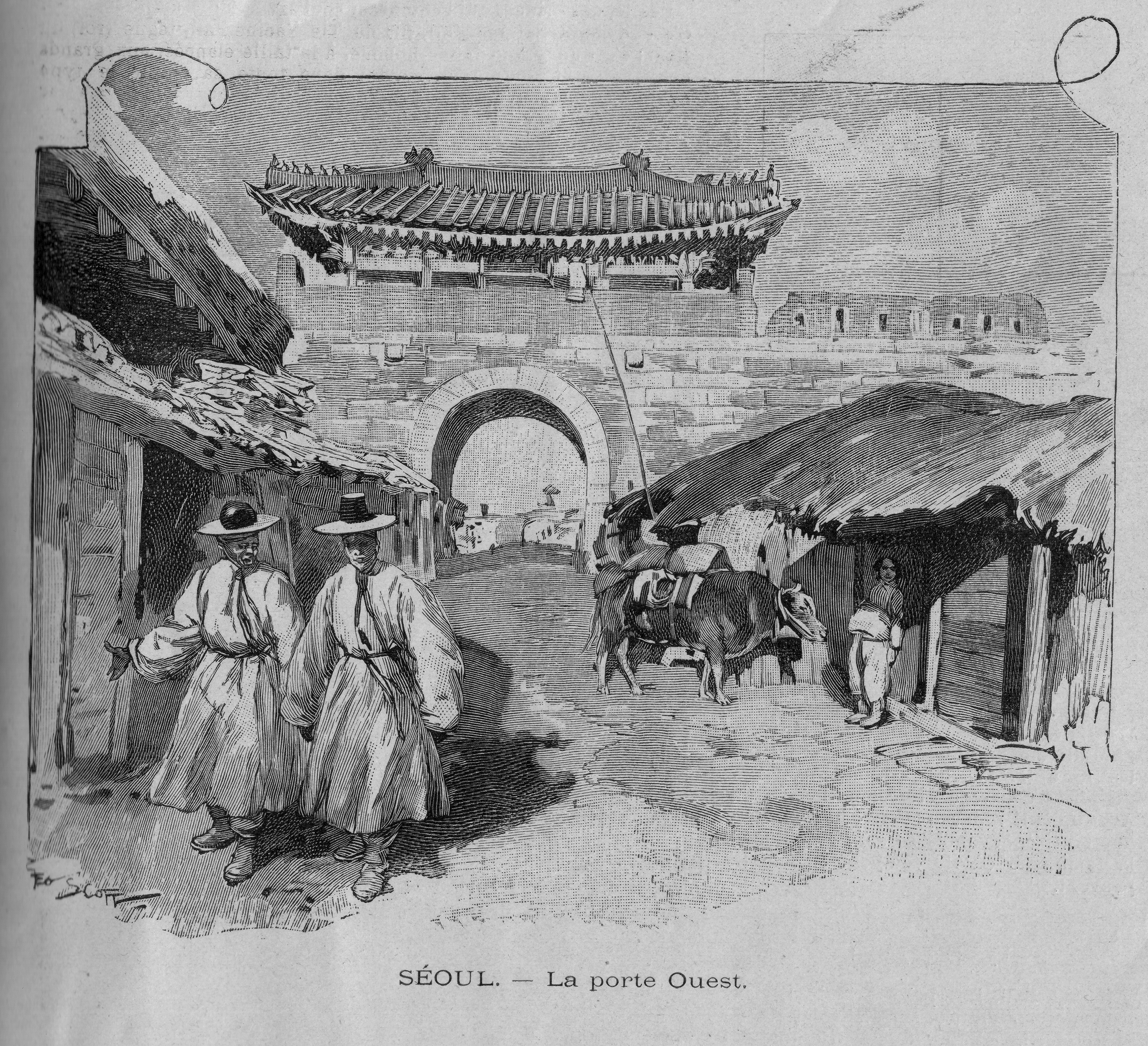
Donuimun sketch, ca. 1894.

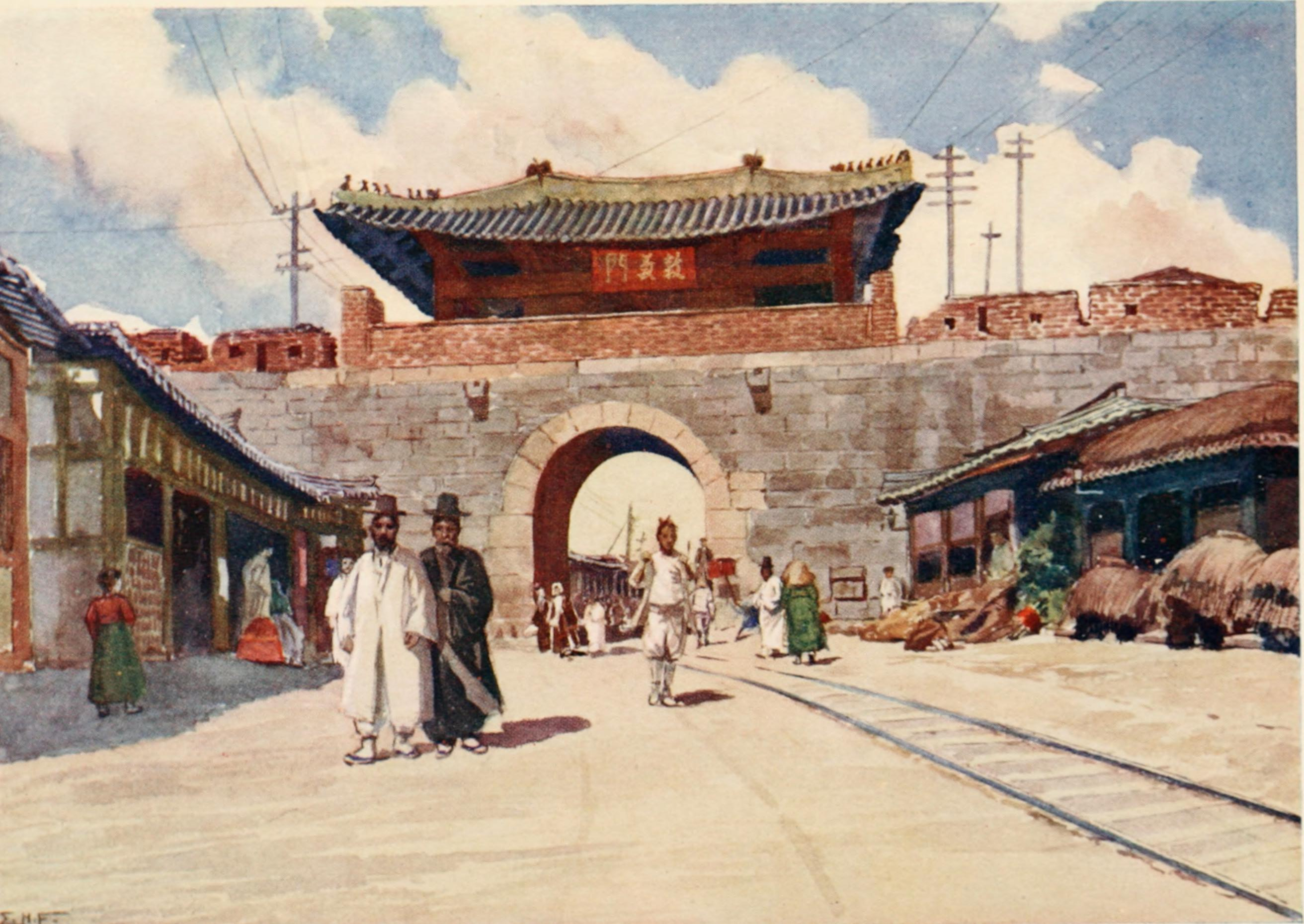
Painting by Constance J. D. Coulson (1910)

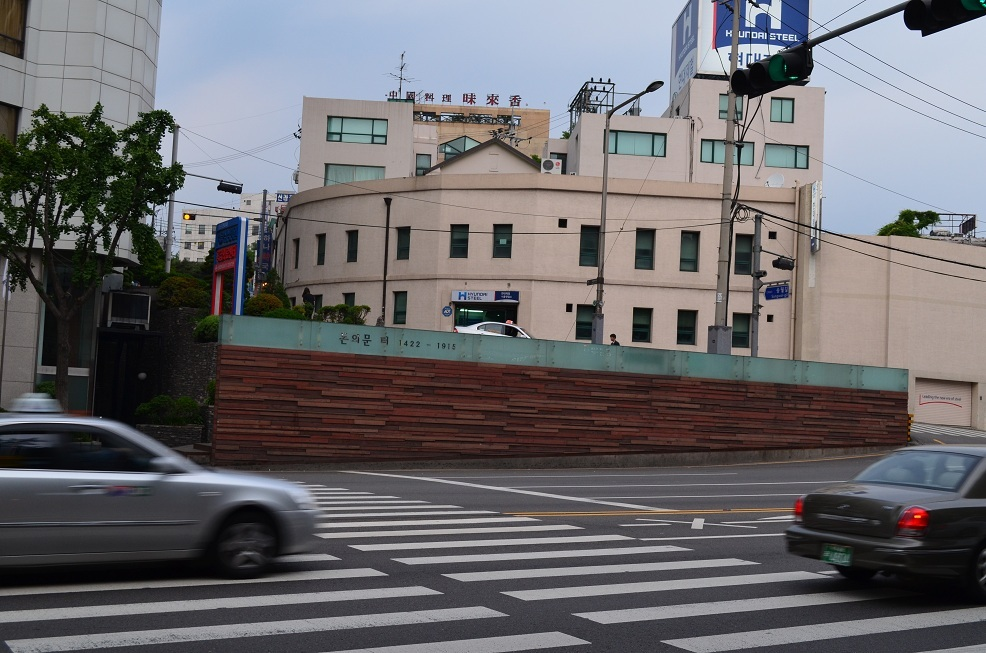
Donuimun Memorial, May 2012.

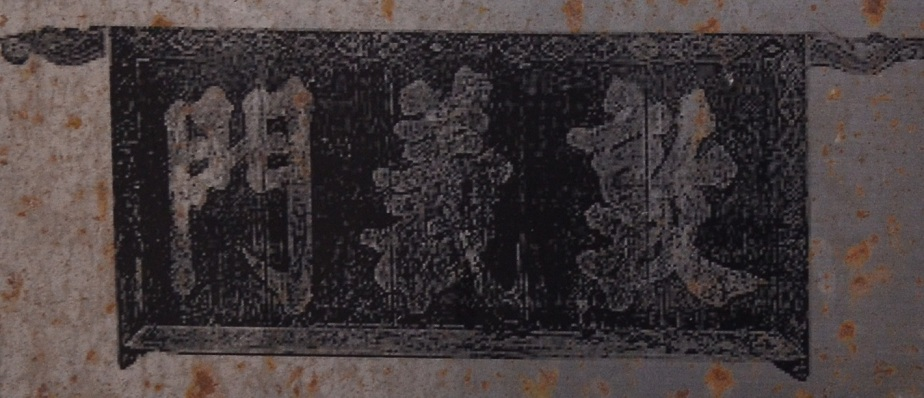
Donuimun Signboard, as represented on the current memorial.

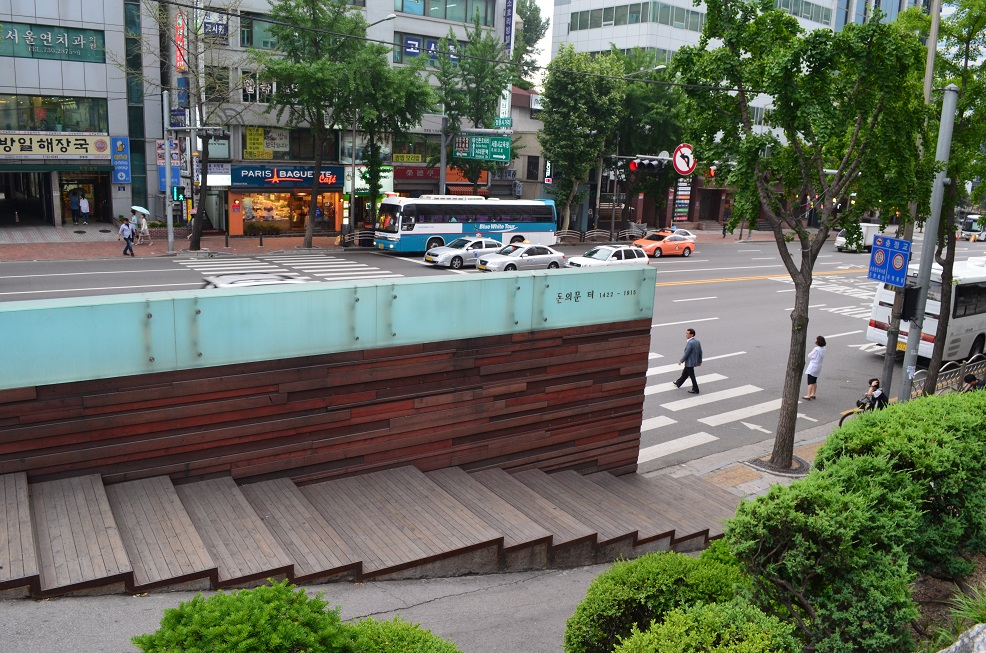
Back of Donuimun Memorial, May 2012.

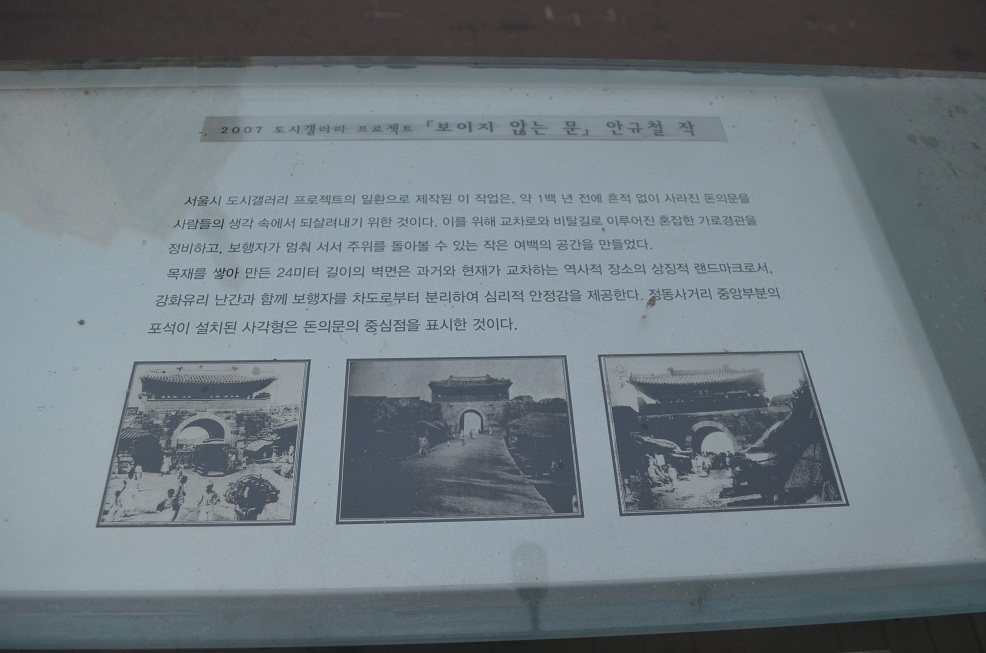
Signage from back of Donuimun Memorial, May 2012.
