= Sukjeongmun =

Old north gate of Seoul, South Korea

Coordinates: 37°35′44″N 126°58′52″E

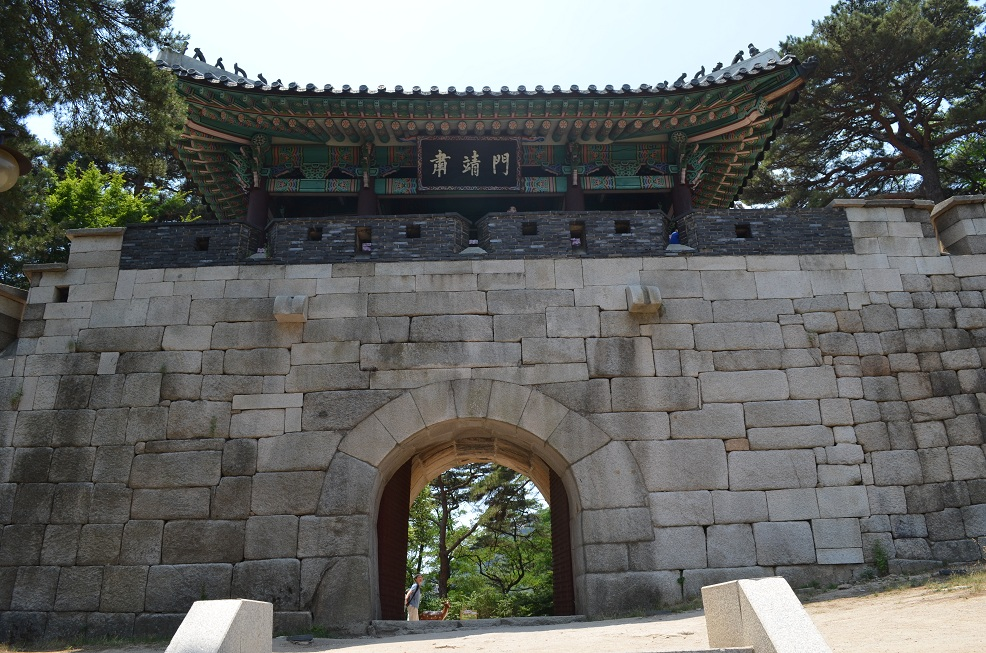
- Sukjeongmun, front of gate, viewed from the north, June 2012.

Korean name
- Hangul: 숙정문
- Hanja: 肅靖門
- RR: Sukjeongmun
- MR: Sukchŏngmun

Sukjeongmun (Korean: 숙정문; Hanja: 肅靖門; also known as North Gate) is one of the Eight Gates of Seoul in the Fortress Wall of Seoul, South Korea, which surrounded the city in the Joseon period. The gate is also known as Bukdaemun (북대문; 北大門; lit. North Big Gate). It was built north of Seoul behind Gyeongbokgung. It was rarely used. It was only used in ceremonious and symbolic functions. In order to visit, identification such as a passport is required for access.

== History ==
Sukjeongmun was originally built in 1396, and was originally called Sukcheongmun (肅淸門), but its name was modified slightly to its current name (肅靖門) in the early 16th century. Being situated so close to the Royal Palace of the Joseon Dynasty, it was rarely used for receiving visitors, and had more of a ceremonious function. The original wooden gatehouse over the gate was destroyed by fire, and the current gatehouse dates from 1976.

The name Sukjeongmun means literally "Rule Solemnly Gate". It is one of the Four Great Gates (사대문) in the Fortress Wall of Seoul.

== Preservation ==
After the infiltration of North Korean agents during the Blue House Raid in 1968, both the gate and the surrounding area were closed off for security reasons. They were opened again for public touring by 2007.

== Image gallery ==
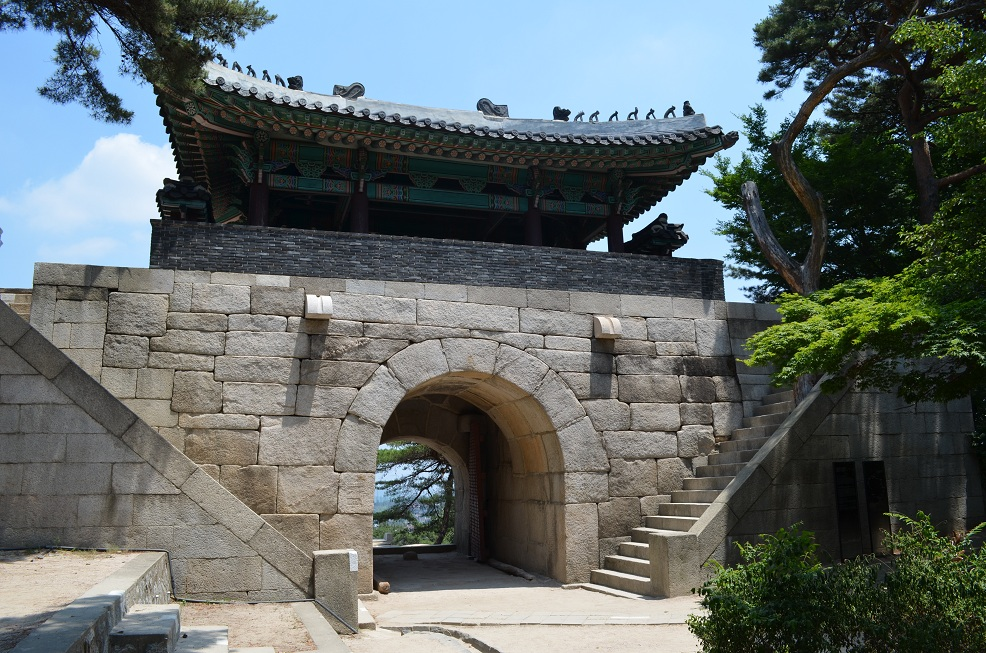
Sukjeongmun Gate, back of gate, viewed from south

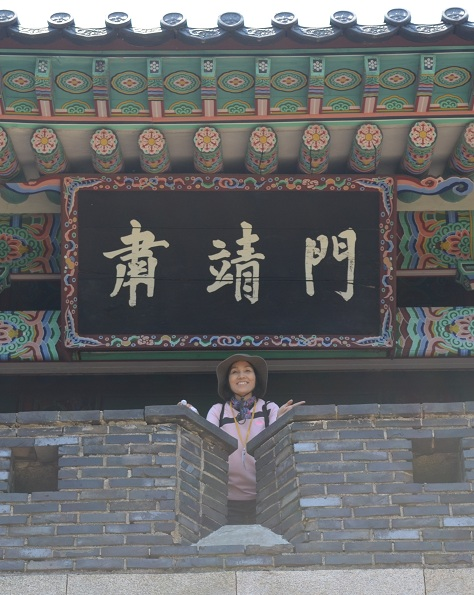
Sukjeongmun signboard of gate, viewed from north

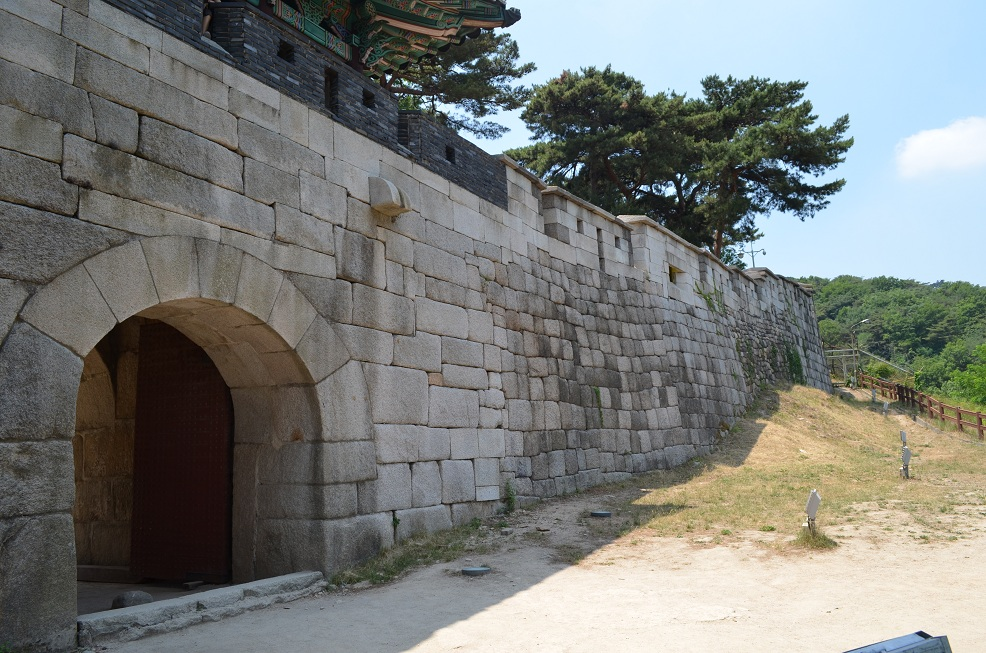
Viewed from the north, showing incorporation into the Fortress Wall

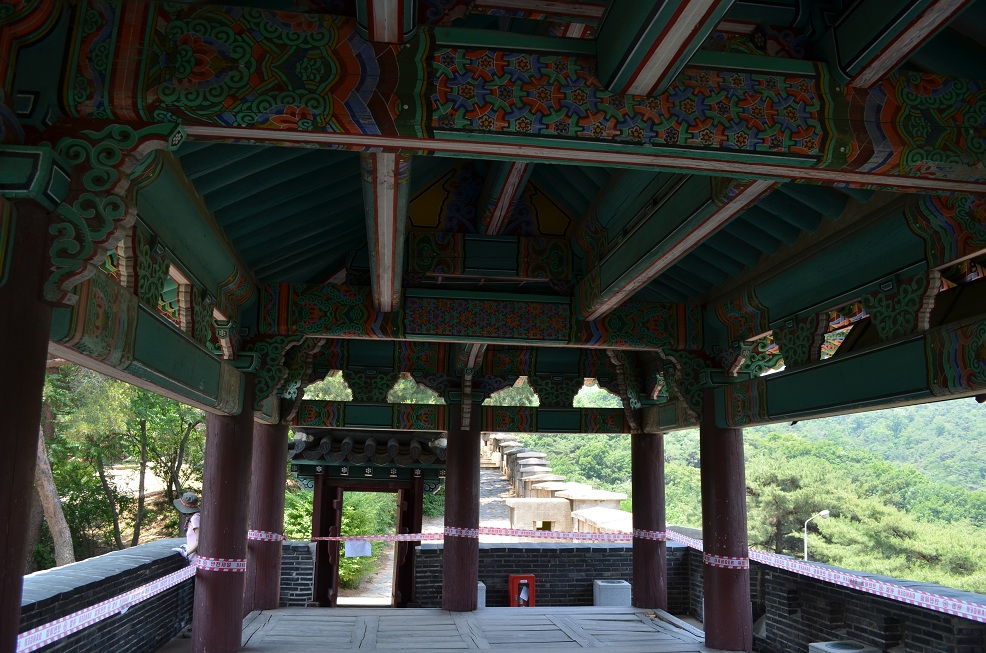
Wooden gatehouse, above the stone gate

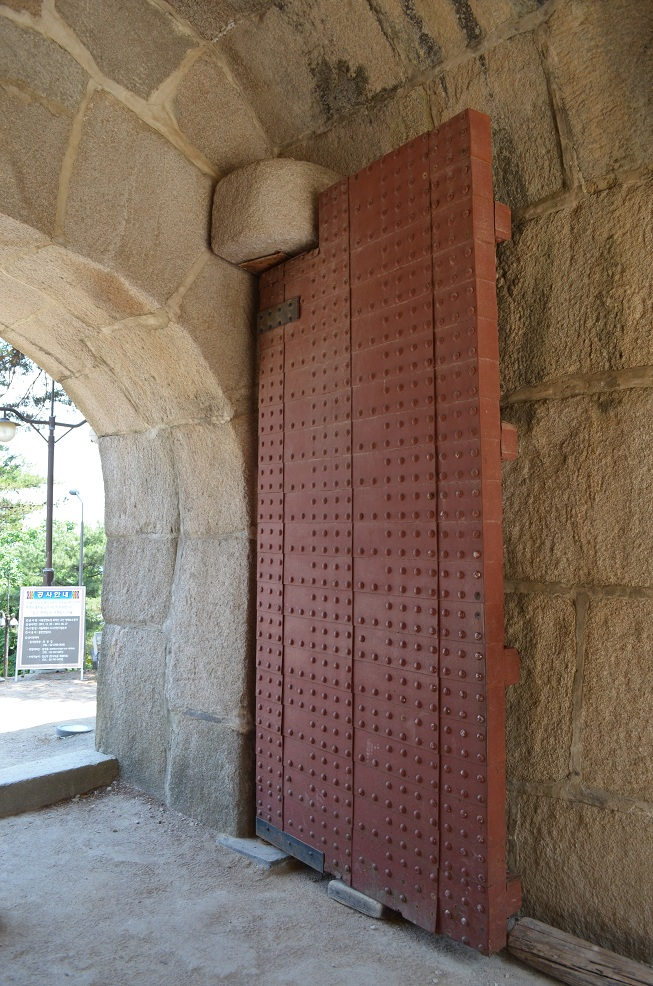
Door, photographed from within the gate

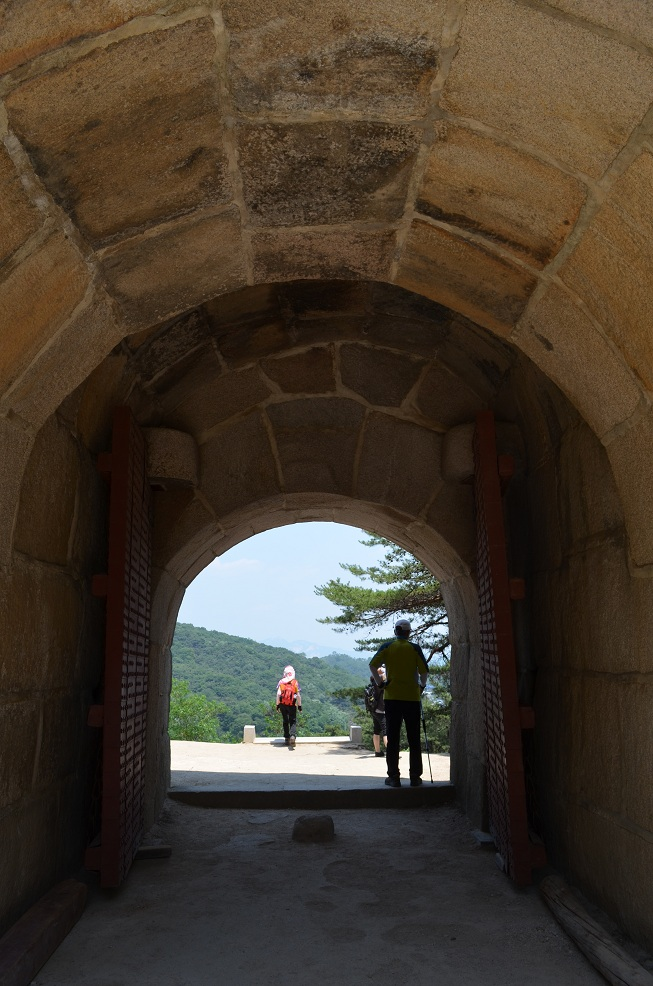
Photo taken from inside gate, looking north

== See also ==
- Bugaksan
- Bukhansan
