= History of Seoul =

Historical account of Seoul

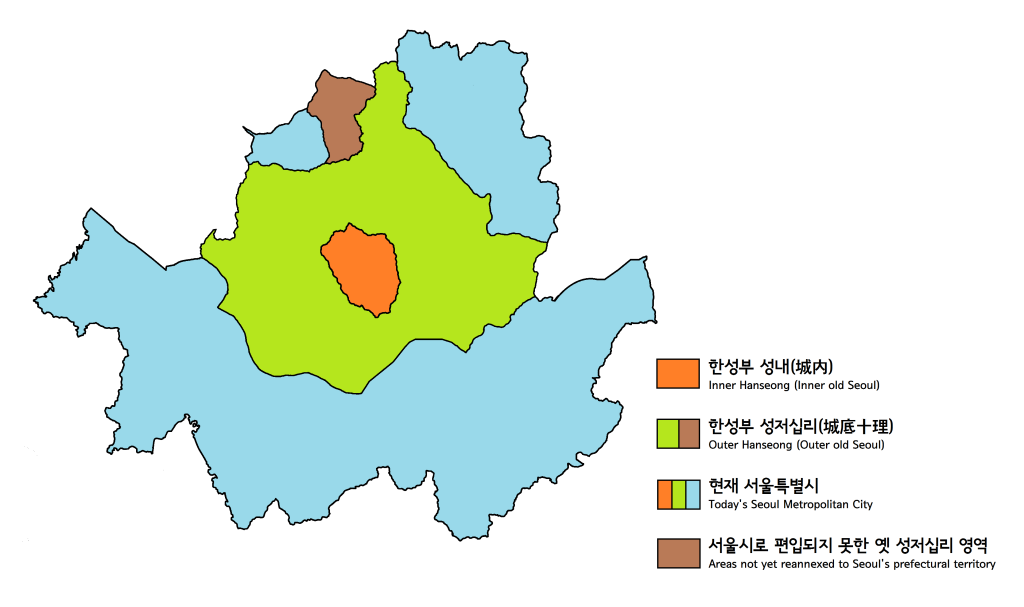
Map of Hanseongbu's territory

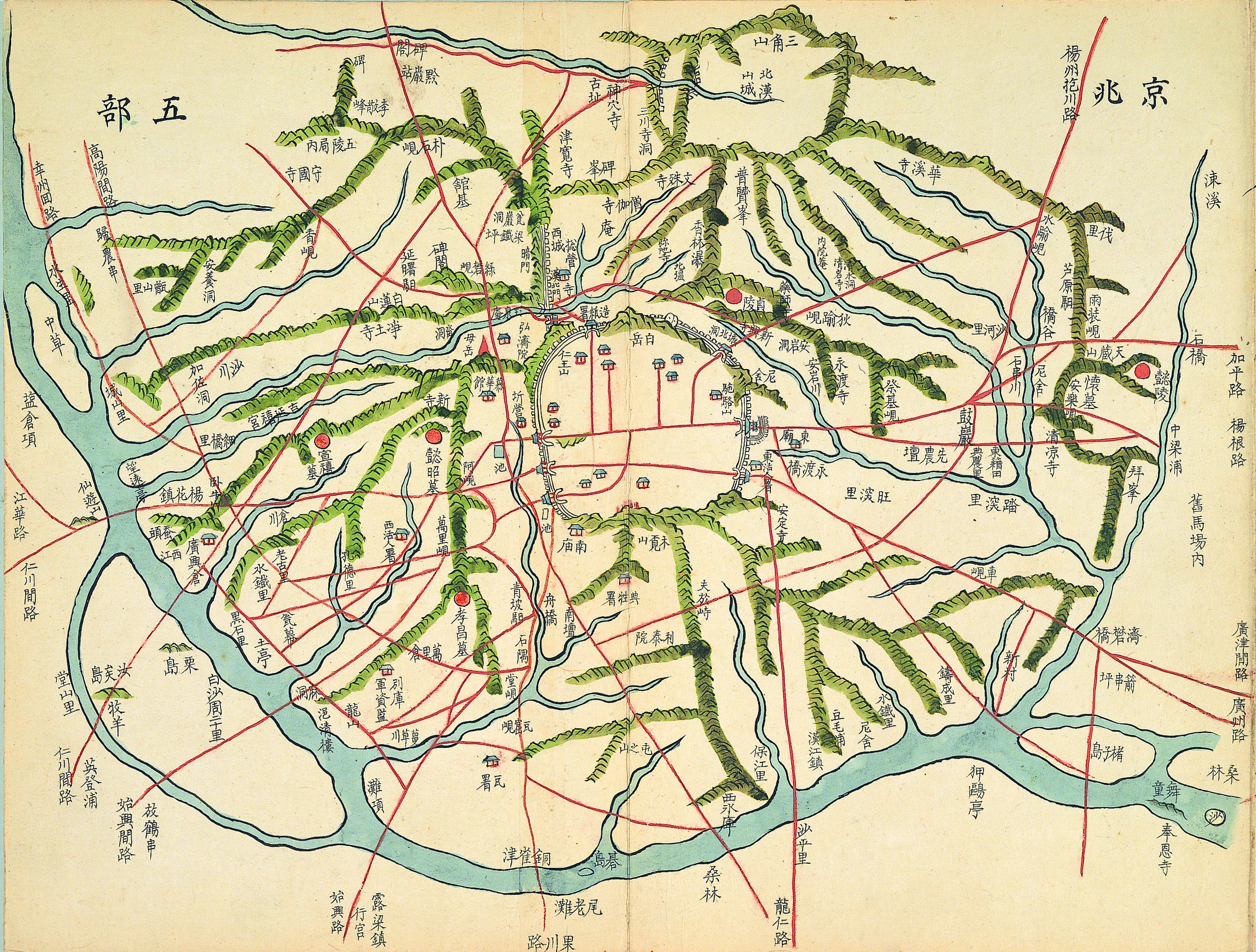
Gyeongjo-obu-do, an old map of Seoul

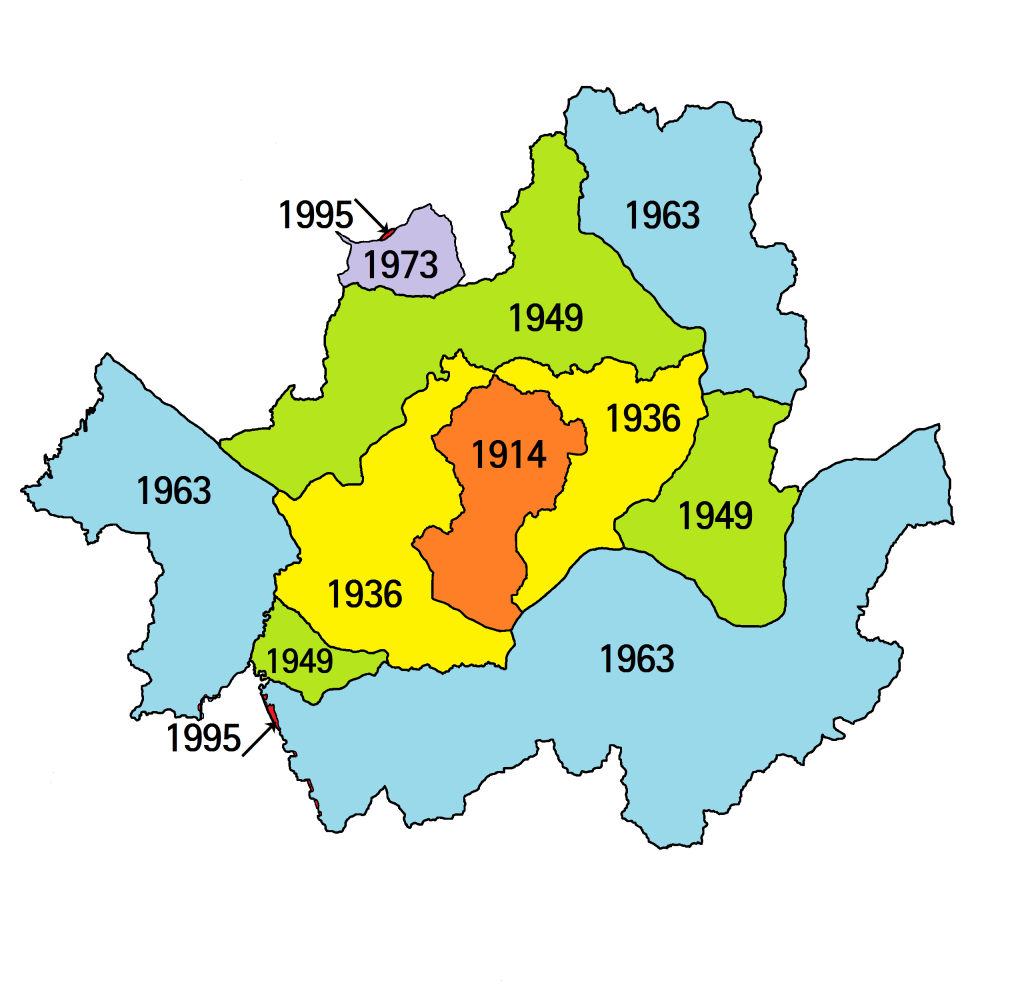
Map of boundary expansion of modern Seoul (from 1914 to 1995)

The region now corresponding to Seoul, South Korea, has been inhabited since the Paleolithic Age. It has been the capital of a number of kingdoms since it was established.

== Prehistoric ==
It is believed that humans were living in the area that is now Seoul along the lower reaches of the Han River during the Paleolithic Age and archaeological research shows that people began to lead settled lives starting in the Neolithic Age. Prehistoric remains that are unearthed in the Amsa-dong Prehistoric Settlement Site, located in Gangdong District, date back to about 3,000 to 7,000 years ago. With the introduction of bronze ware from about 700 BC, settlements gradually began to spread from the river basin toward inland areas.

== Three Kingdoms and Unified Silla period ==
In 18 BC, the kingdom of Baekje founded its capital city, Wiryeseong, which is believed to be inside modern-day Seoul. Baekje subsequently developed from a member state of the Mahan confederacy into one of the Three Kingdoms of Korea. There are several city wall remains in the Seoul area dating from this time. Among them, Pungnap Toseong, an earthen wall in the southeastern part of modern-day Seoul (in Pungnap-dong, just near Jamsil-dong area), is widely believed to be the main Wiryeseong site. Yet another earthen wall, Mongchon Toseong, located nearby, is also dated from the early Baekje era.

All of these sites are in the south of the Han River, and do not belong to the historic Seoul district (centered in modern-day Jongno District), which is well in the north of the river.

Historical Records
Year (Lunar)	Samguk Sagi Joseon Edition / Goryeosa	Samguk Sagi Goryeo Edition / Stone Scripts	After comparison	Conclusion
553	Silla takes control of northeast frontier of Baekje, and installed Sin Province (신주; 新州; literally New Province).	Not available		
554	Combined force of Baekje and Gaya was defeated by Sin Provincial Military Governor Kim Mu-ryeok, and Seong of Baekje was killed during battle. Kim Yu-sin's grandfather Kim Mu-ryeok defeated enemies and captured Seong of Baekje.			
557	Silla abolished Sin Province, and established Bukhansan Province (북한산주; 北漢山州; North Hansan Province).	Not available		
568	Silla abolished Bukhansan Province, and established Namcheon Province (남천주; 南川州; South River Province). Silla abolished Sin Provincial HQ (신주정; 新州停), and established Namcheon HQ (남천정; 南川停).			
603	Goguryeo attacked Bukhansan City (북한산성; 北漢山城; North Hansan City), but retreated after 10,000 Silla reinforcement led by the king himself crossed Hanshui (한수; 漢水).			
604	Silla abolished Namcheon Province, and reestablished Bukhansan Province. Silla abolished Namcheon HQ (남천정; 南川停), and established Hansan HQ (한산정, 漢山停).			
611	Baekje laid siege and captured Gajam City (가잠성; 椵岑城).	Baekje laid siege on Gajam City (가잠성; 椵岑城). Silla king ordered to dispatch reinforcements from Sang Province (상주; 上州; Upper Province), Ha Province (하주; 下州; Lower Province), and Sin Province (신주; 新州; New Silla Province), but was defeated after a battle.	Goryeo Edition overrides Joseon Edition. Sin Province was not abolished. Sin Province and Hansan Province were different entities.	
618	Byeonpum, the Bukhansan Provincial Army Lord and Haeron fought against Baekje to retake Gajam City.	Haeron, the Banner Master of Geumsan, and Byeonpum, the Governor of Hansan Province (한산주; 漢山州) took control of Gajam City.	Goryeo Edition overrides Joseon Edition. Bukhansan did not exist as province but as a city. In addition, Bukhansanseong should be translated as Bukhansan City (북한산성; 北漢山城; North Hansan City) due to the existence of Hansan Province and Hansan HQ.	
661	Combined force of Goguryeo and Malgal laid siege on Bukhansan City.			
668		Munmu the Great lead an army of 200,000 and arrived at Bukhansan City (북한산성; 北漢山城; North Hansan City).		
704		Gim Dae-mun becomes governor of Hansan Province.		

In 554, Baekje and Gaya attempted to retake the region, but the Silla army led by Sin Province Lord (신주군주; 新州軍主) Kim Mu-ryeok (김무력; 金武力) defeated the combined force and killed the Seong of Baekje.

Silla soon gained full control of the city and then the peninsula, and during the Unified Silla period, Hanyang (한양; 漢陽) first referred to a district in the city, and later the city itself.

== Goryeo period ==
It was thought that the kingdom that controlled the Han River valley would also have strategic control of the whole peninsula, because it was a center of transportation.

In 1104, King Sukjong of the Goryeo Dynasty built a palace near present-day Gyeongbokgung, which was then referred to as Namgyeong (남경; 南京) or "Southern Capital". Seoul grew into a full-scale city with political significance during this time.

== Joseon period ==
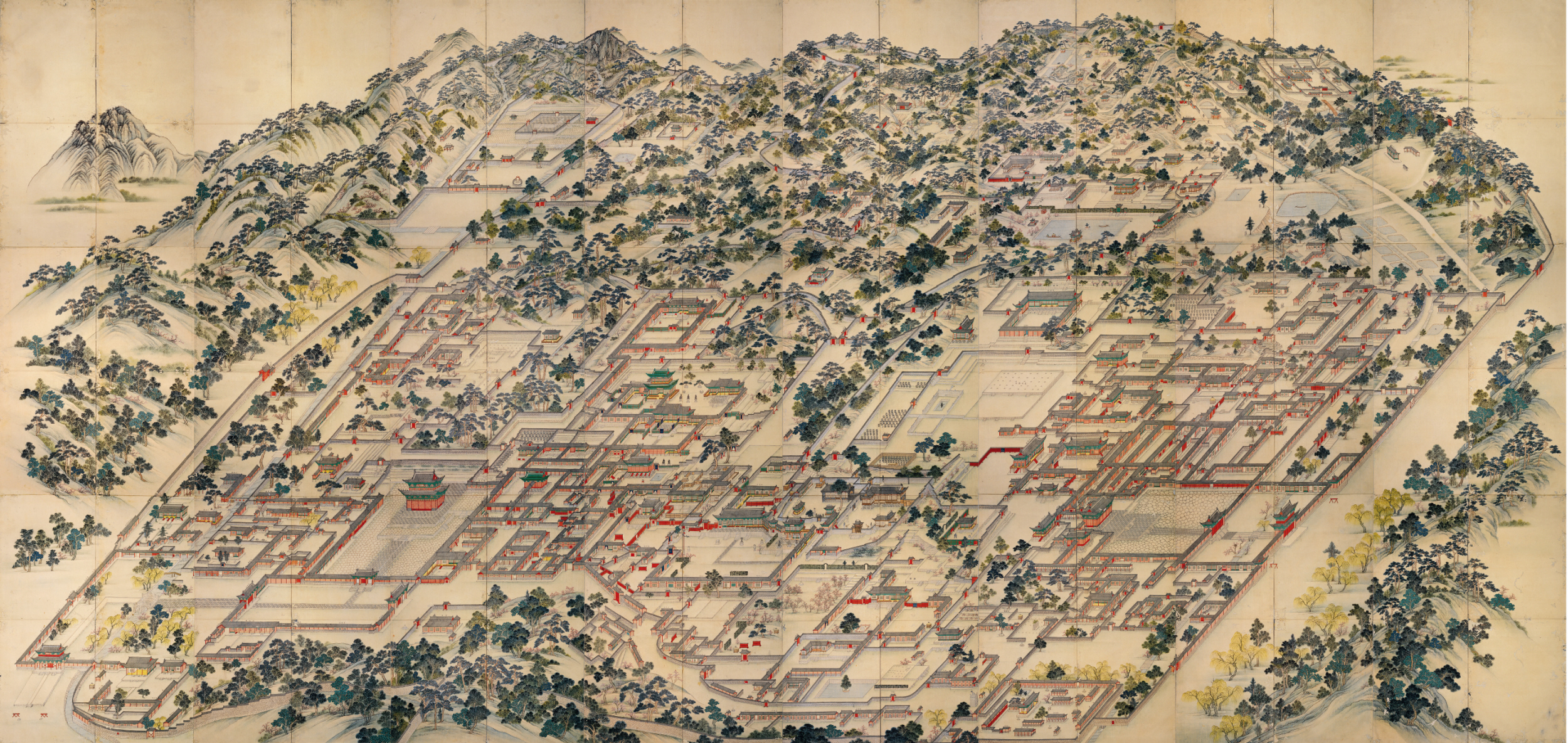
Donggwoldo, Joseon Dynasty painting of main royal palaces of Seoul

At the beginning of the Joseon Dynasty in 1394, the capital was moved to Seoul, also known as Hanyang and later as Hanseong (한성, 漢城 'Fortress city [on] the Han [River]'), where it remained until the fall of the dynasty.

Originally entirely surrounded by a massive circular wall (a 20-foot (6.1 m)-high circular stone fortress) to provide its citizens security from wild animals such as the tigers as well as thieves and attacks. The city has grown beyond those walls and although the wall no longer stands (outside of the mountains north of the downtown area), the gates remain near the downtown district of Seoul, including most notably Sungnyemun (commonly known as Namdaemun 'South Gate') and Heunginjimun (commonly known as Dongdaemun 'East Gate') but also Sukjeongmun (commonly known as Bukdaemun 'North Gate') and four smaller gates included Changuimun and Hyehwamun. During the Joseon Dynasty, the gates were opened and closed each day, accompanied by the ringing of large bells. A capital prefecture, Hanseong, consisted of inner districts (i.e. 사대문안; lit. 'inside of the city wall') and outer districts (성저십리; lit. 'outside of the city wall'; approximately 4 kilometres (2.5 mi) off the city wall). The Jungnangcheon River, the Han River, Mount Bukhan, and Hongjecheon formed the administrative prefectural boundary.

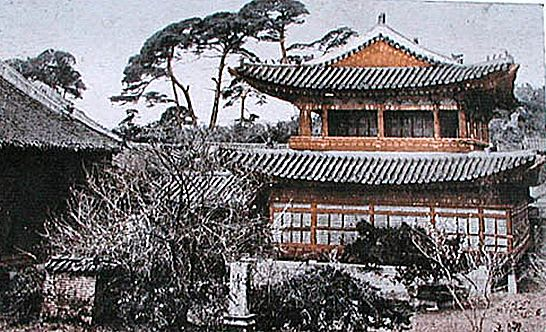
Gyeonghungak was an attached two-storied building of Daejojeon Hall of Changdeok Palace. The first story was Gyeonghungak, and the second story was Jinggwangru.

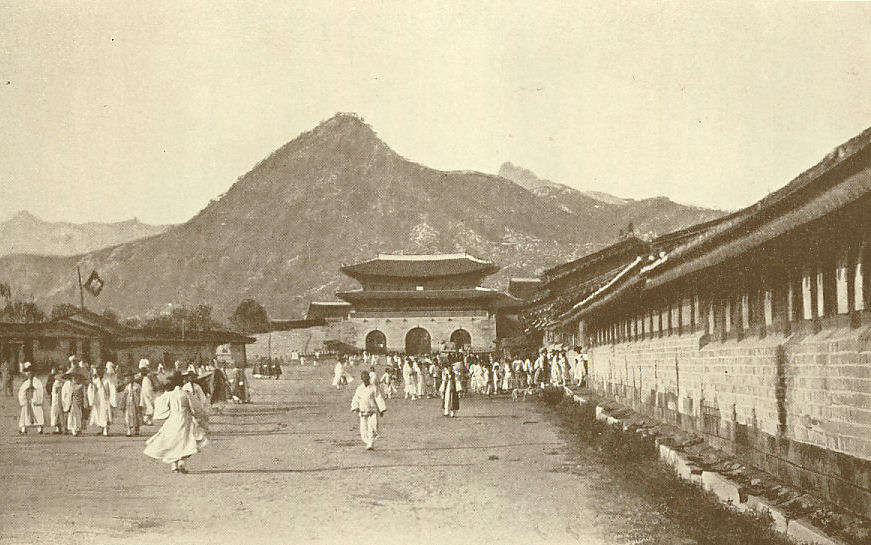
The street in front of Gyeongbokgung palace in the late 19th century

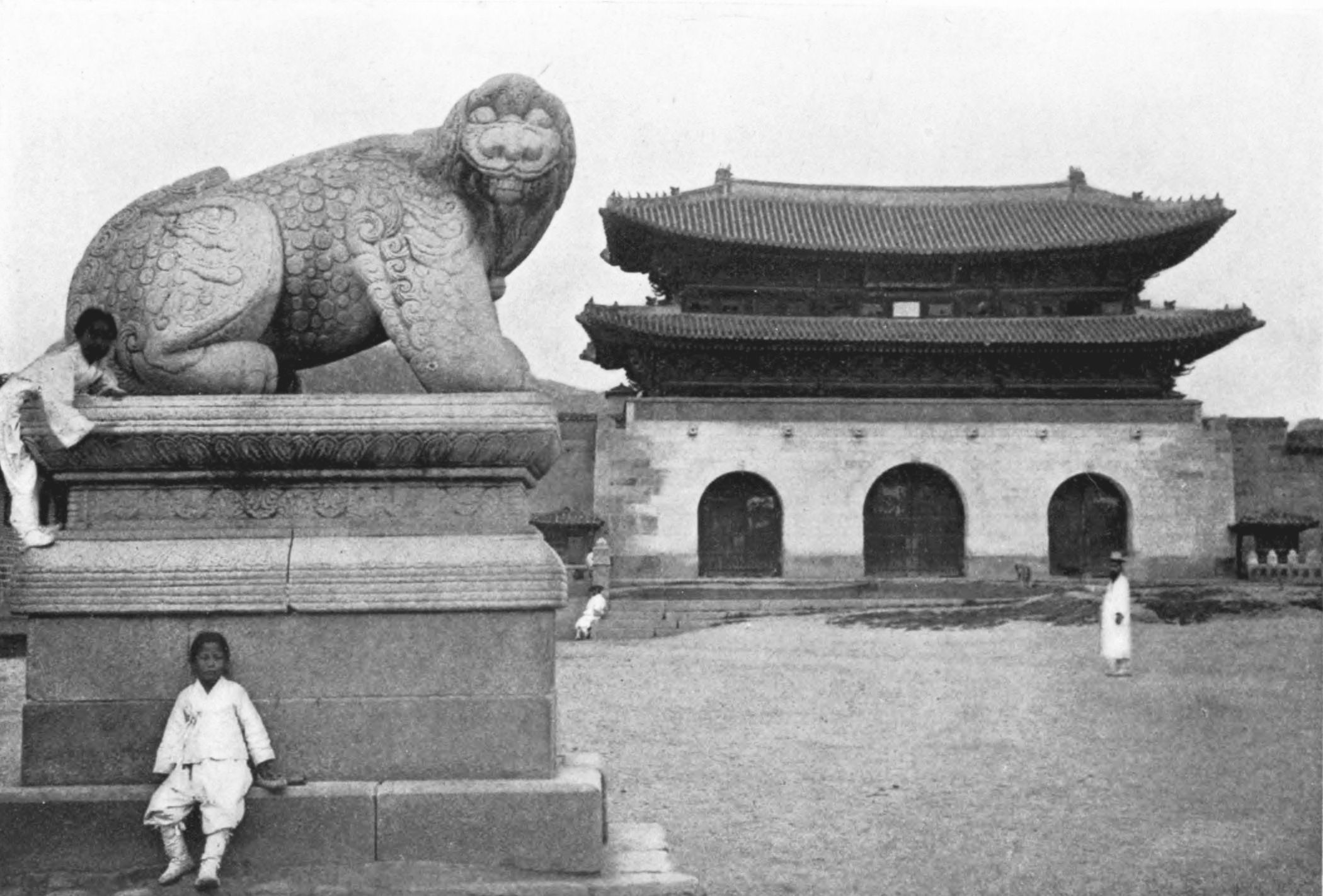
Gwanghwa Gate, the main gate of Gyeongbokgung Palace

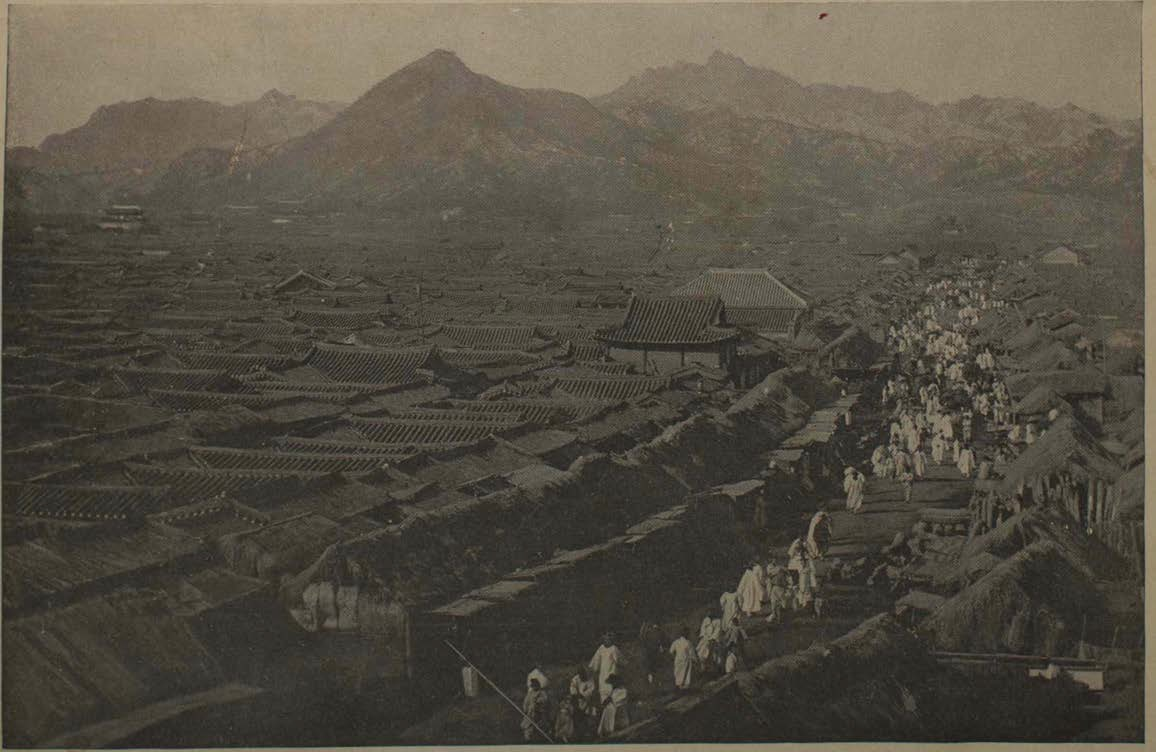
Seoul in 1894

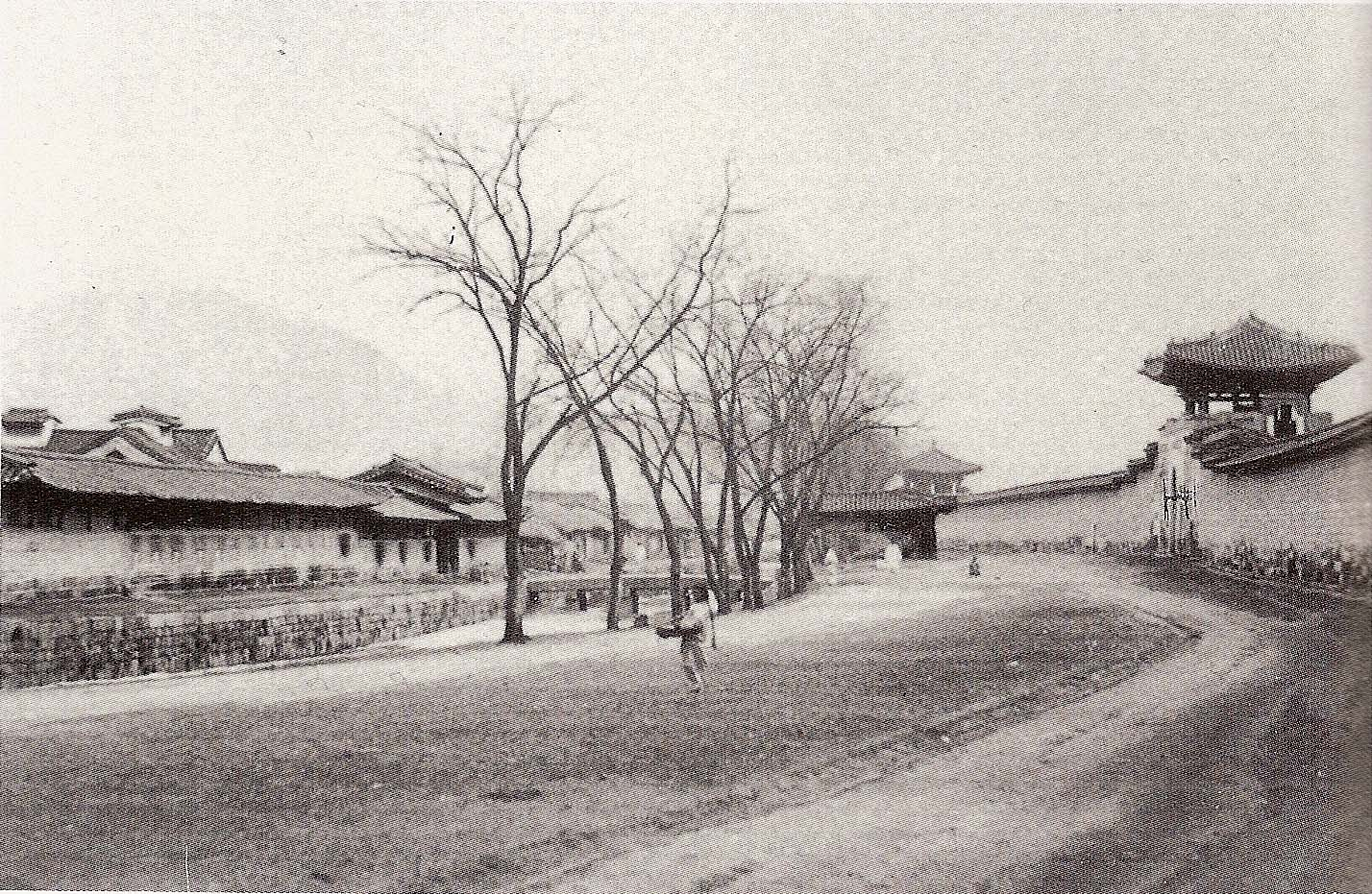
Waryong-dong, Seoul, in the late Joseon Dynasty

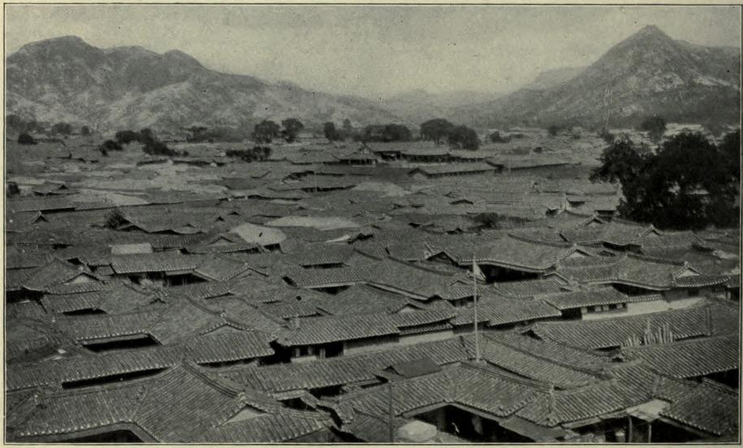
Streetscape in front of Changdeokgung (1931)

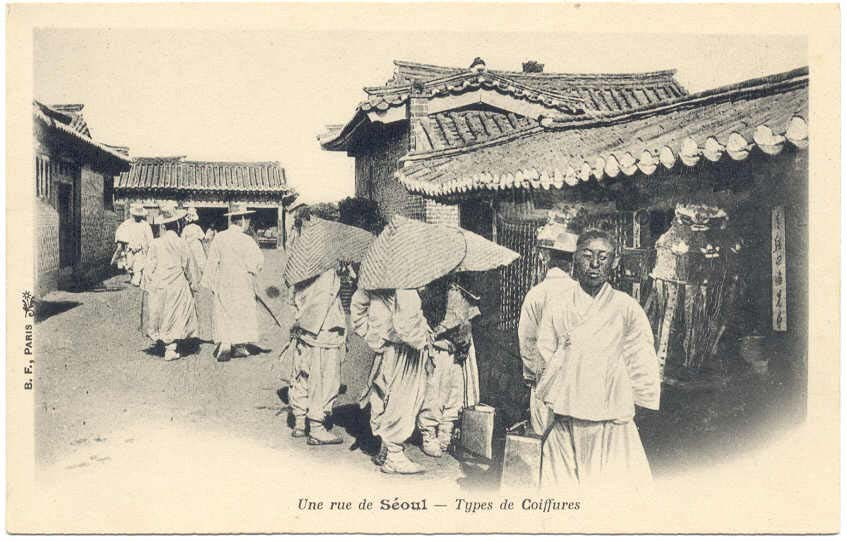
A narrow street of 19th-century Seoul

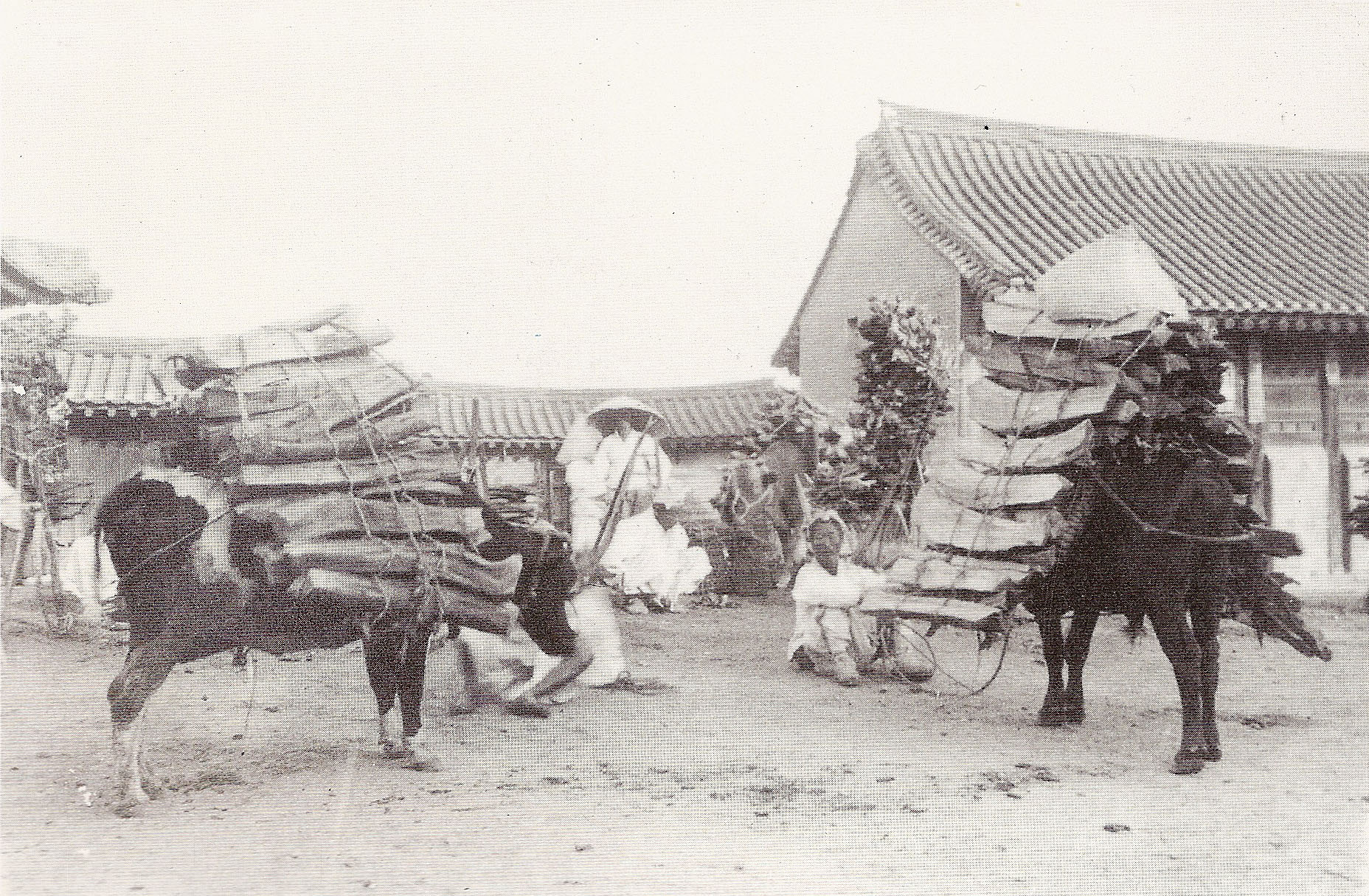
A street of 19th-century Seoul

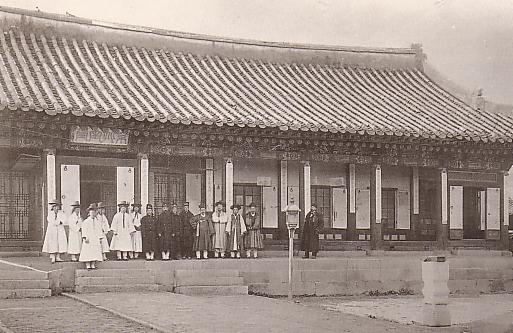
Hanseong Municipal Government

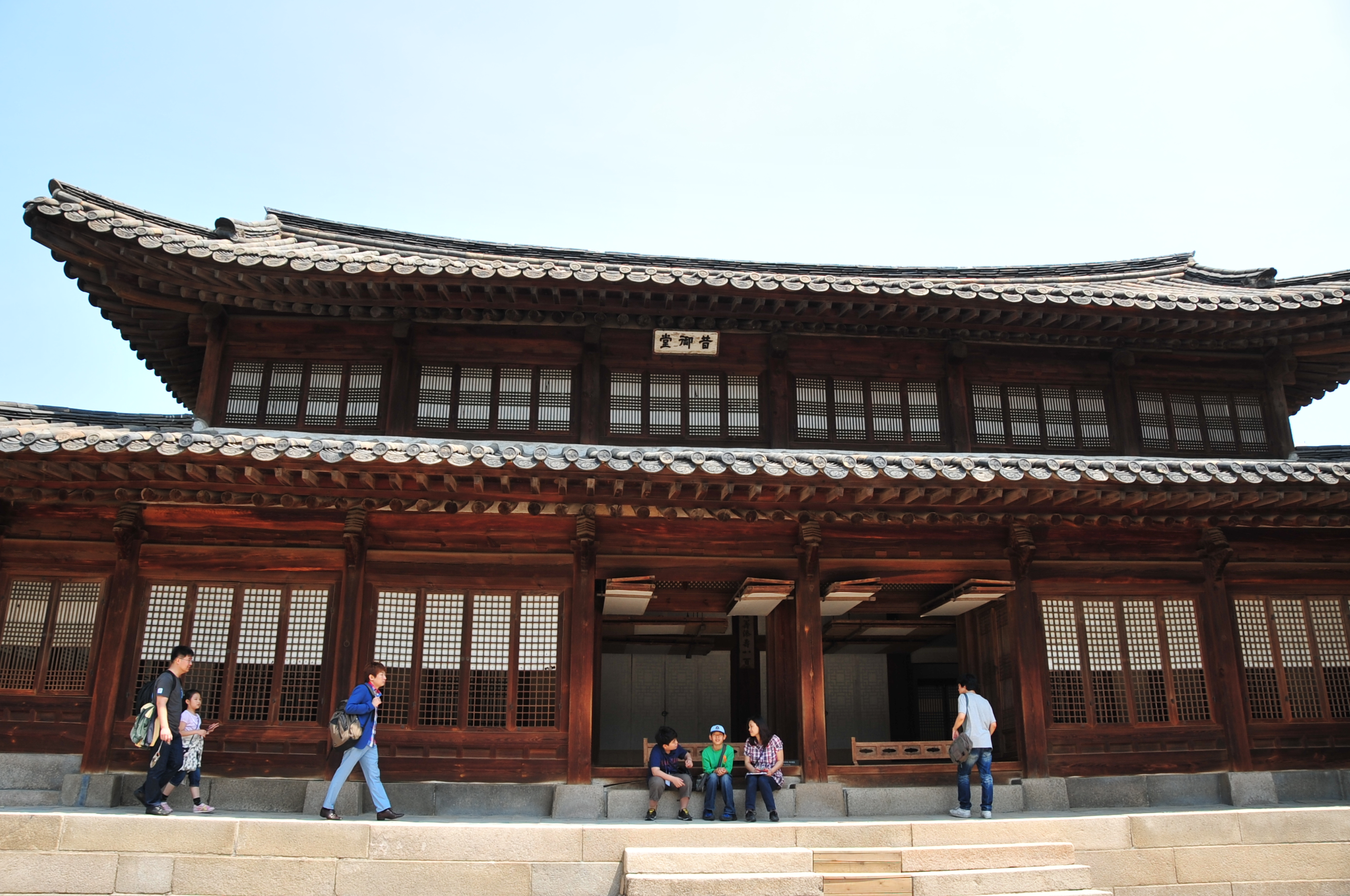
Seokeodang is a two-storey building of Deoksugung Palace built in the style of a private residence.

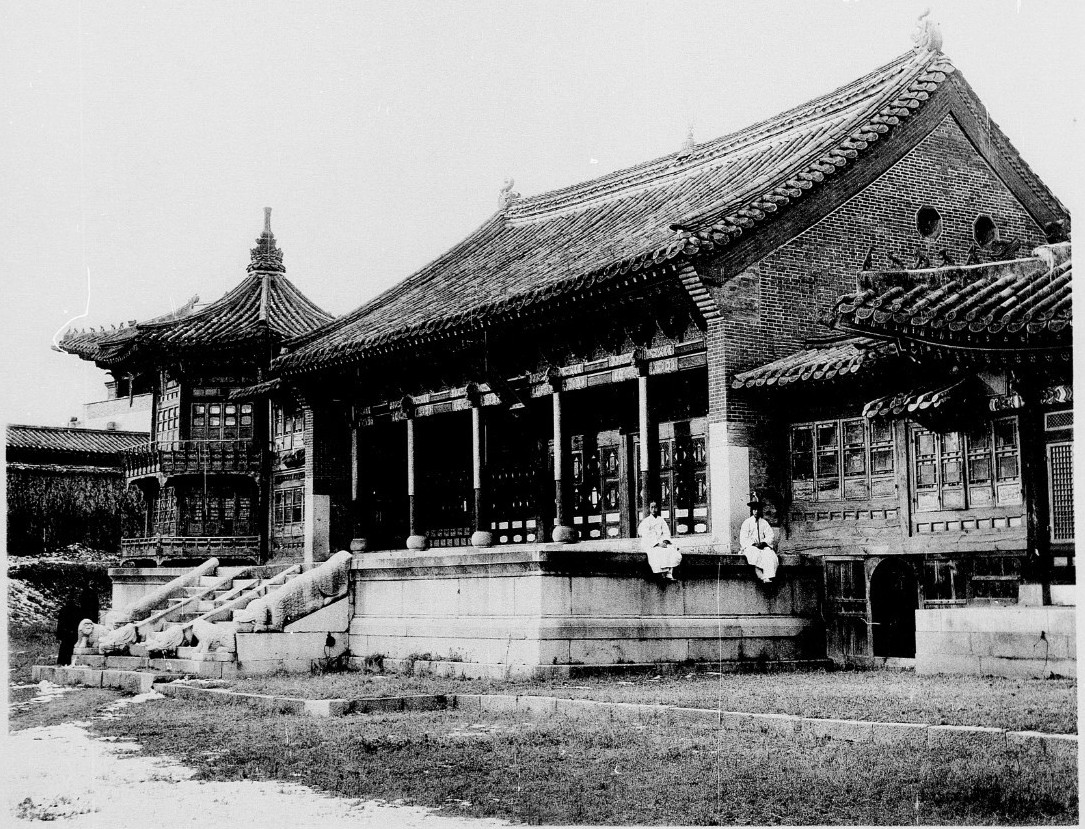
Jibokjae, the Royal Library of Seoul in the late Joseon period

== Korean Empire period ==
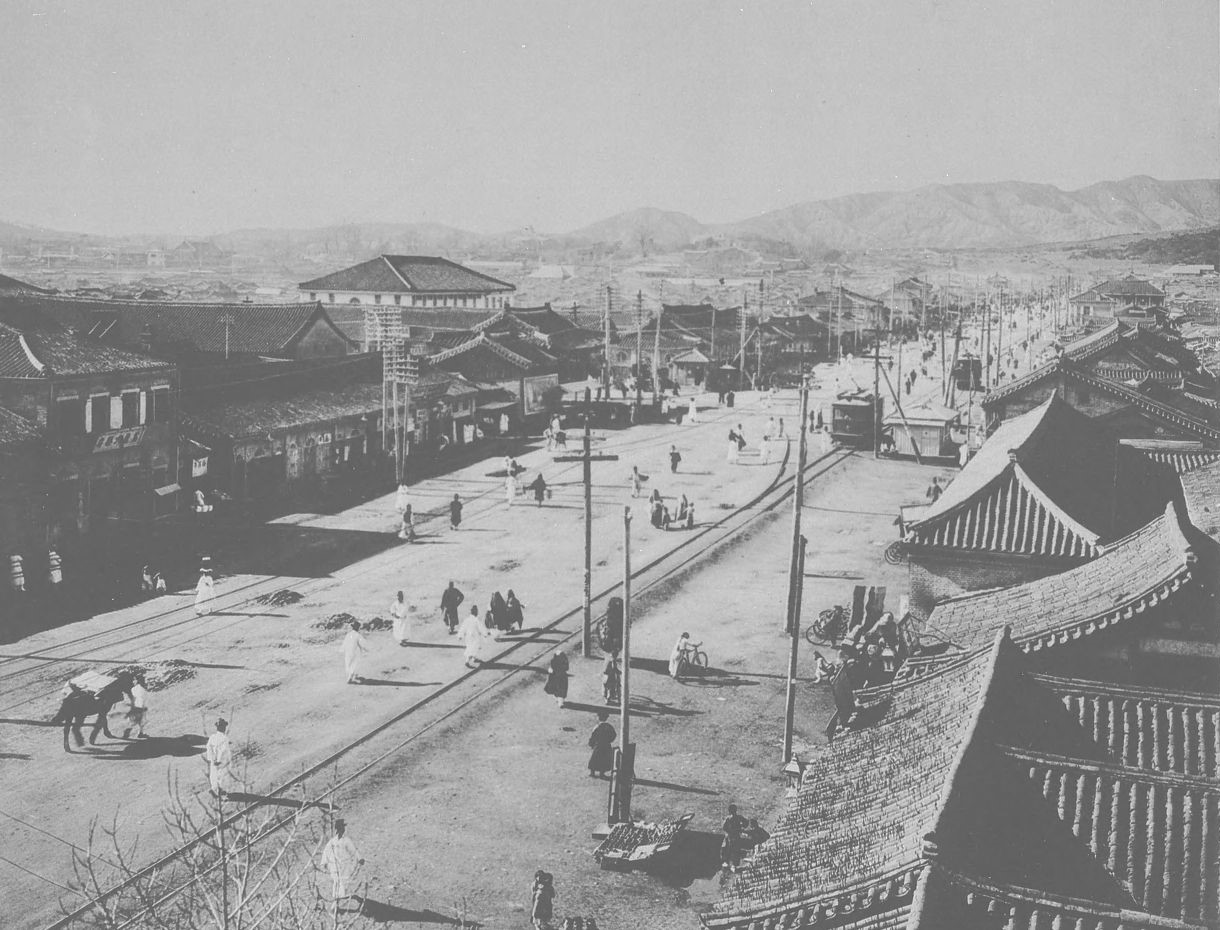
Seoul, capital city of the Korean Empire, in 1905, showing contrast between tradition and modernity

In the late 19th century, after hundreds of years of isolation, Seoul opened its gates to foreigners and began to modernize. Seoul became the first city in East Asia to have electricity, trolley cars, water, telephone, and telegraph systems all at the same time. Much of this was due to trade with foreign countries like France and United States. For example, the Seoul Electric Company, Seoul Electric Trolley Company, and Seoul Fresh Spring Water Company were all joint Korean-American owned enterprises. In 1904, an American by the name of Angus Hamilton visited the city and said, "The streets of Seoul are magnificent, spacious, clean, admirably made and well-drained. The narrow, dirty lanes have been widened, gutters have been covered, roadways broadened. Seoul is within measurable distance of becoming the highest, most interesting and cleanest city in the East".

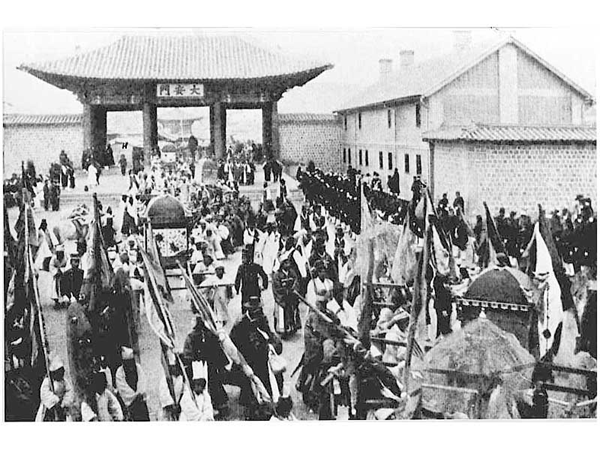
Funeral of Empress Myeongseong, 21 November 1897

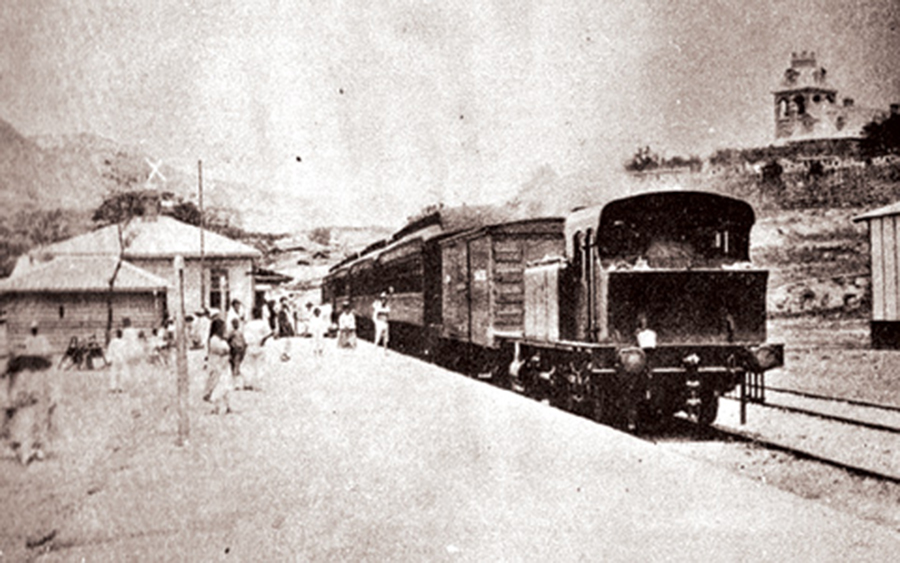
The West Gate of Seoul, Korean Empire (대한제국 서대문역), a railway station constructed during the Gwangmu Reform

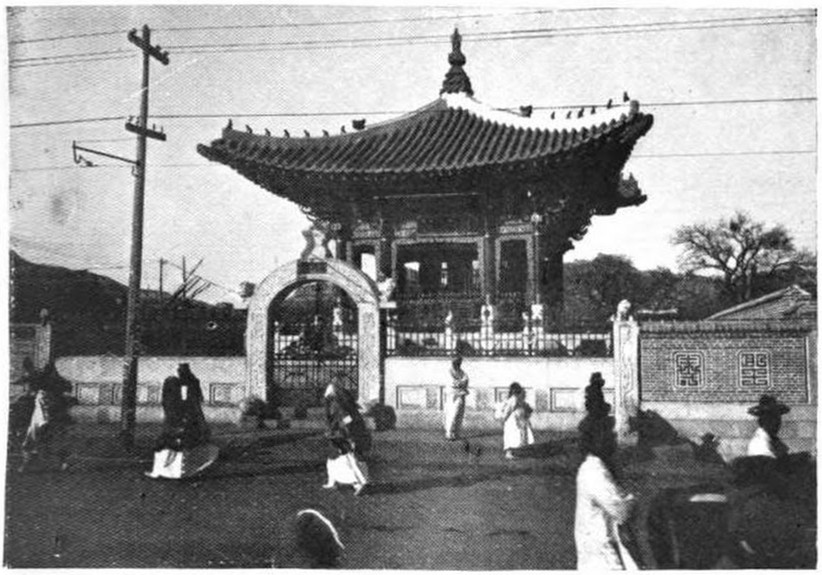
Bigak (Monument for the 40th Anniversary of Emperor Gojong's Enthronement), built in 1902

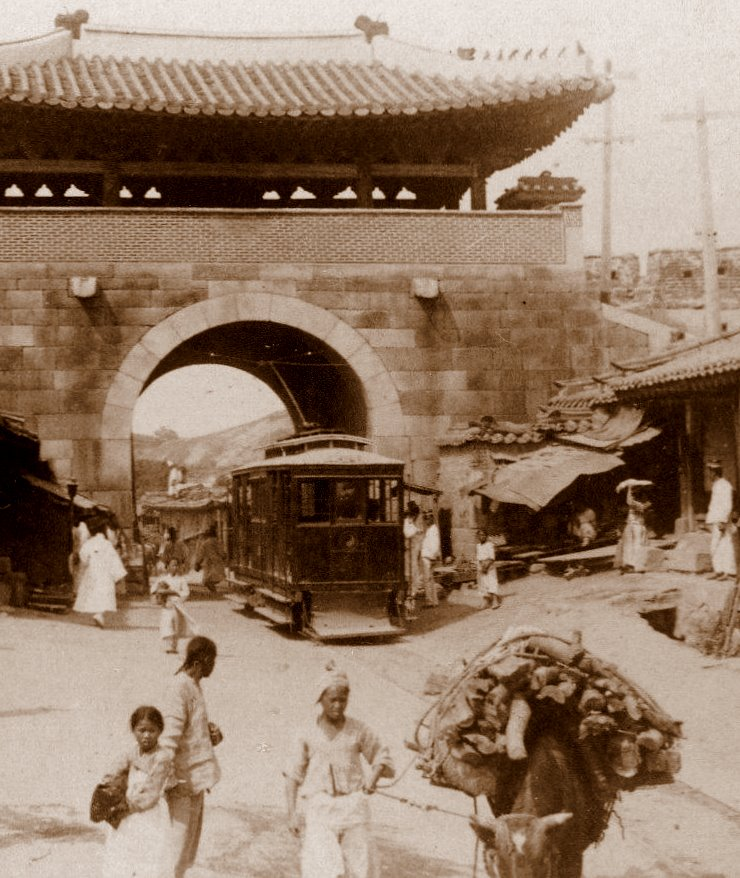
Streetcar in Seoul, 1903

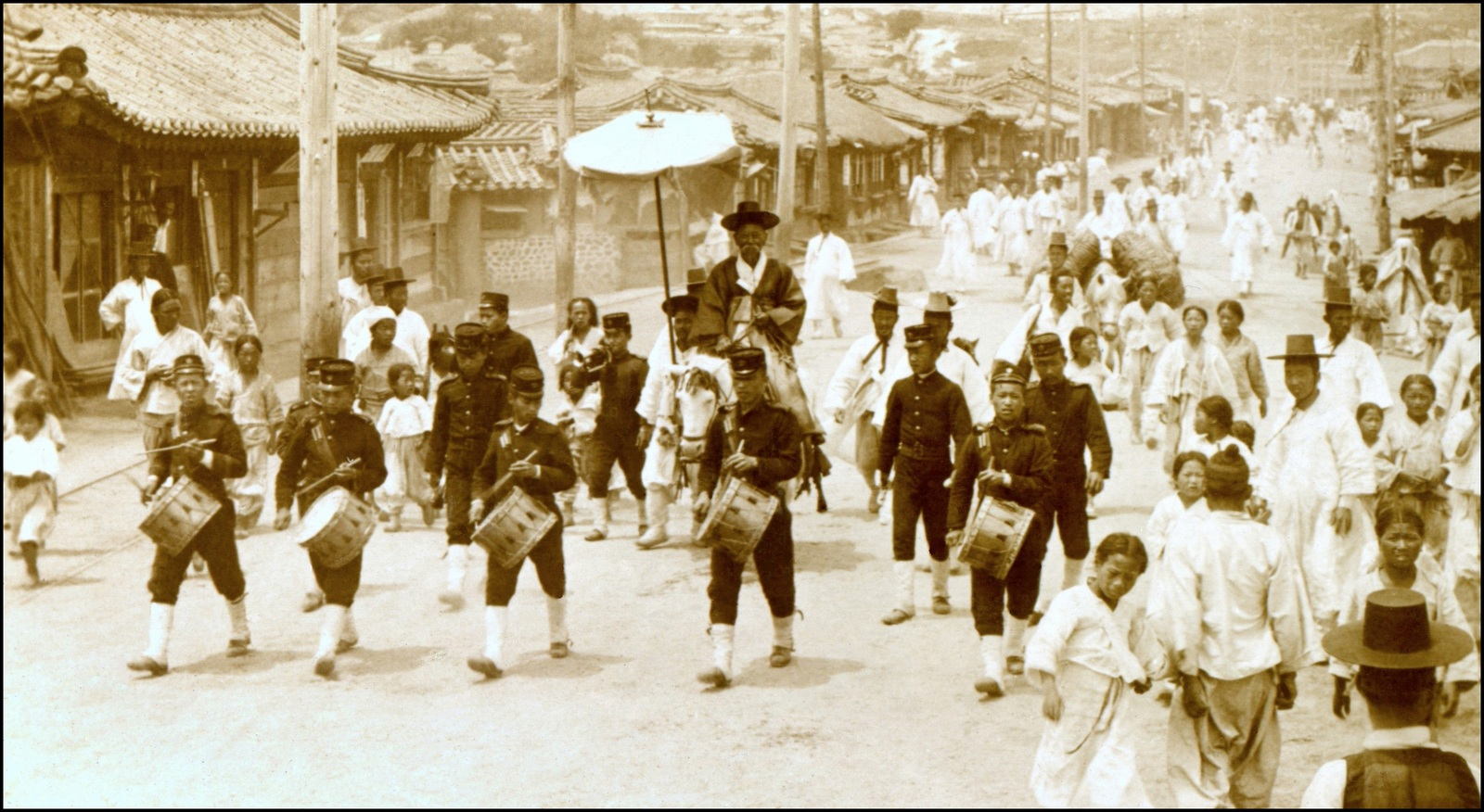
A Korean Drum & Bugle corps escorts the Grand-Master of the Emperor's royal stables through Seoul in 1903.

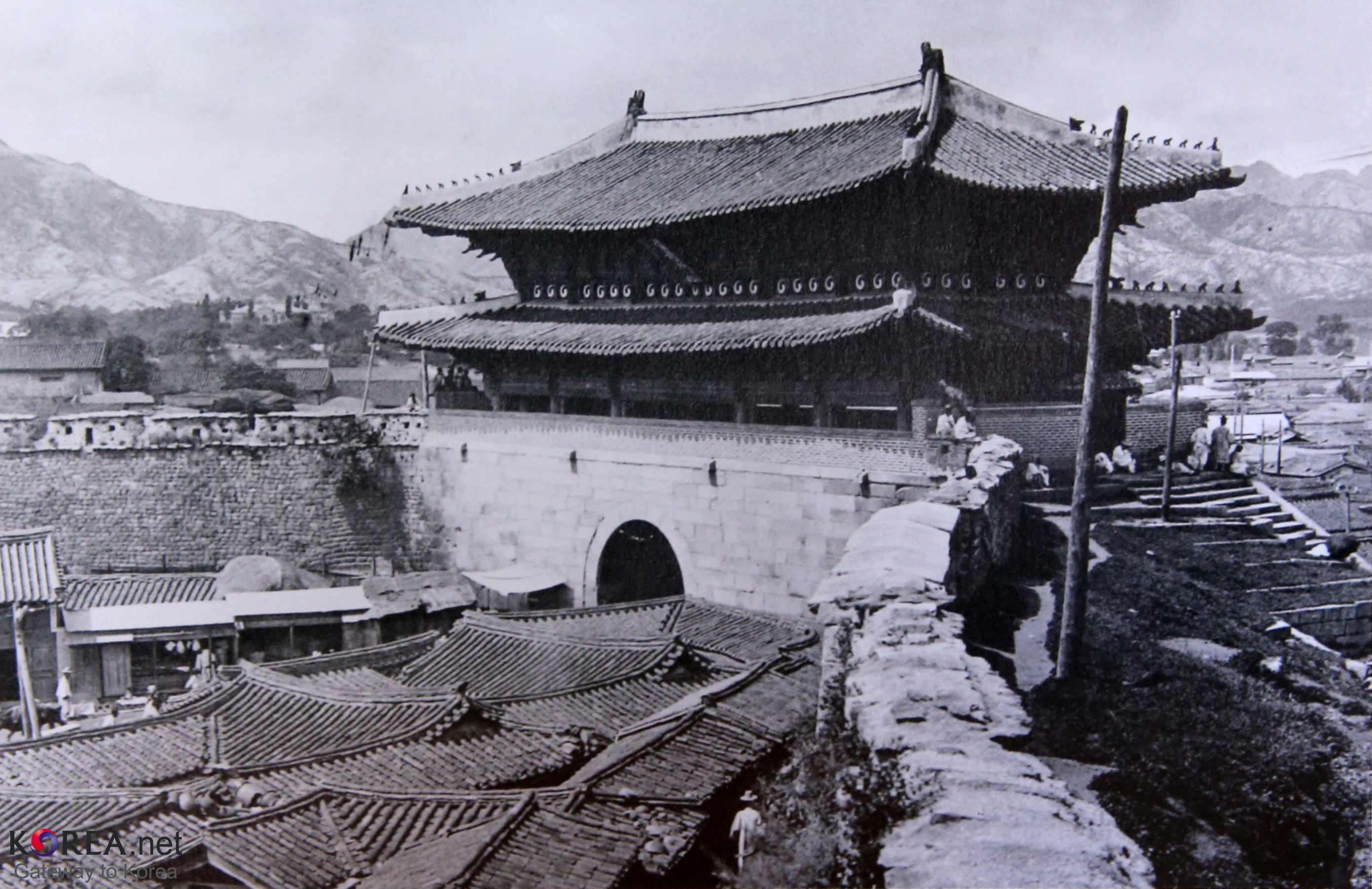
Sungnyemun, 1904

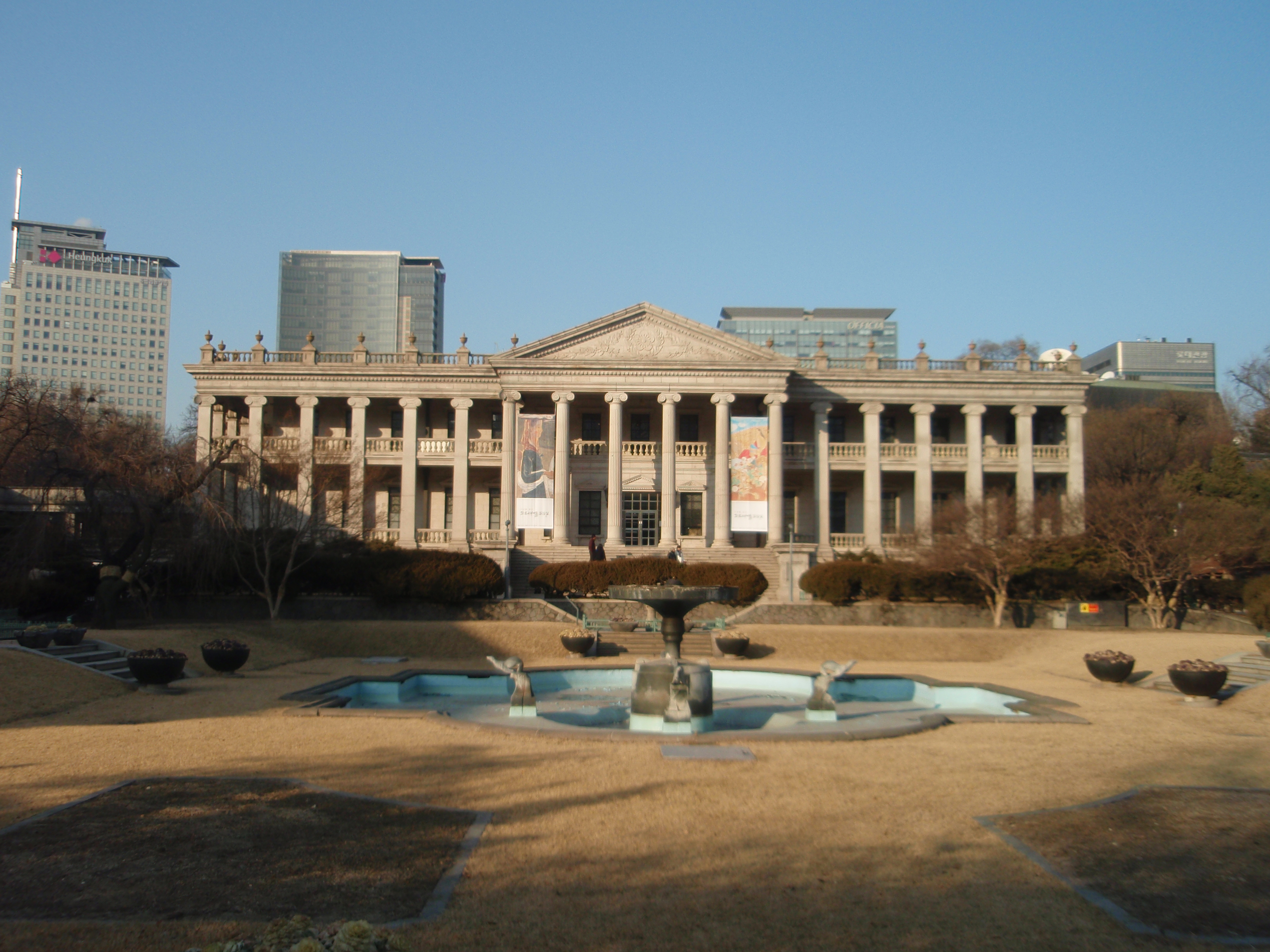
Seokjojeon, Imperial palace of Korean Empire

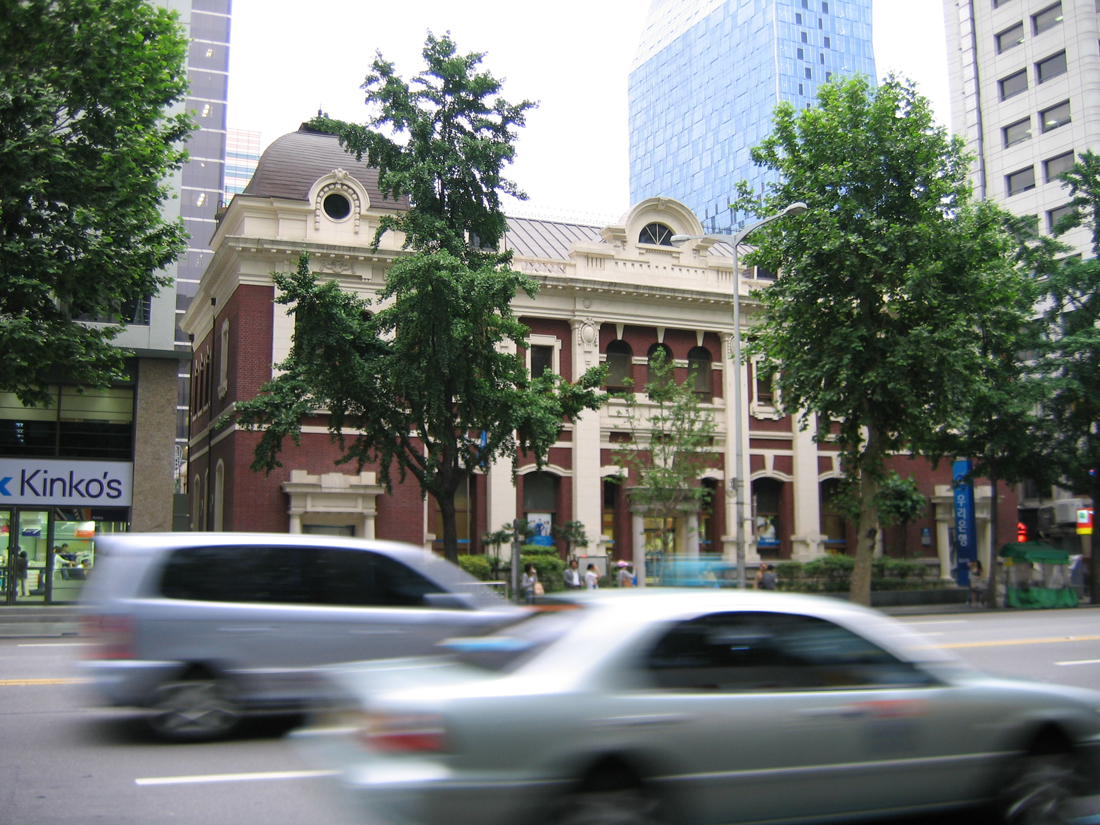
Gwangtonggwan, the head office building of former Daehan Cheon-il Bank

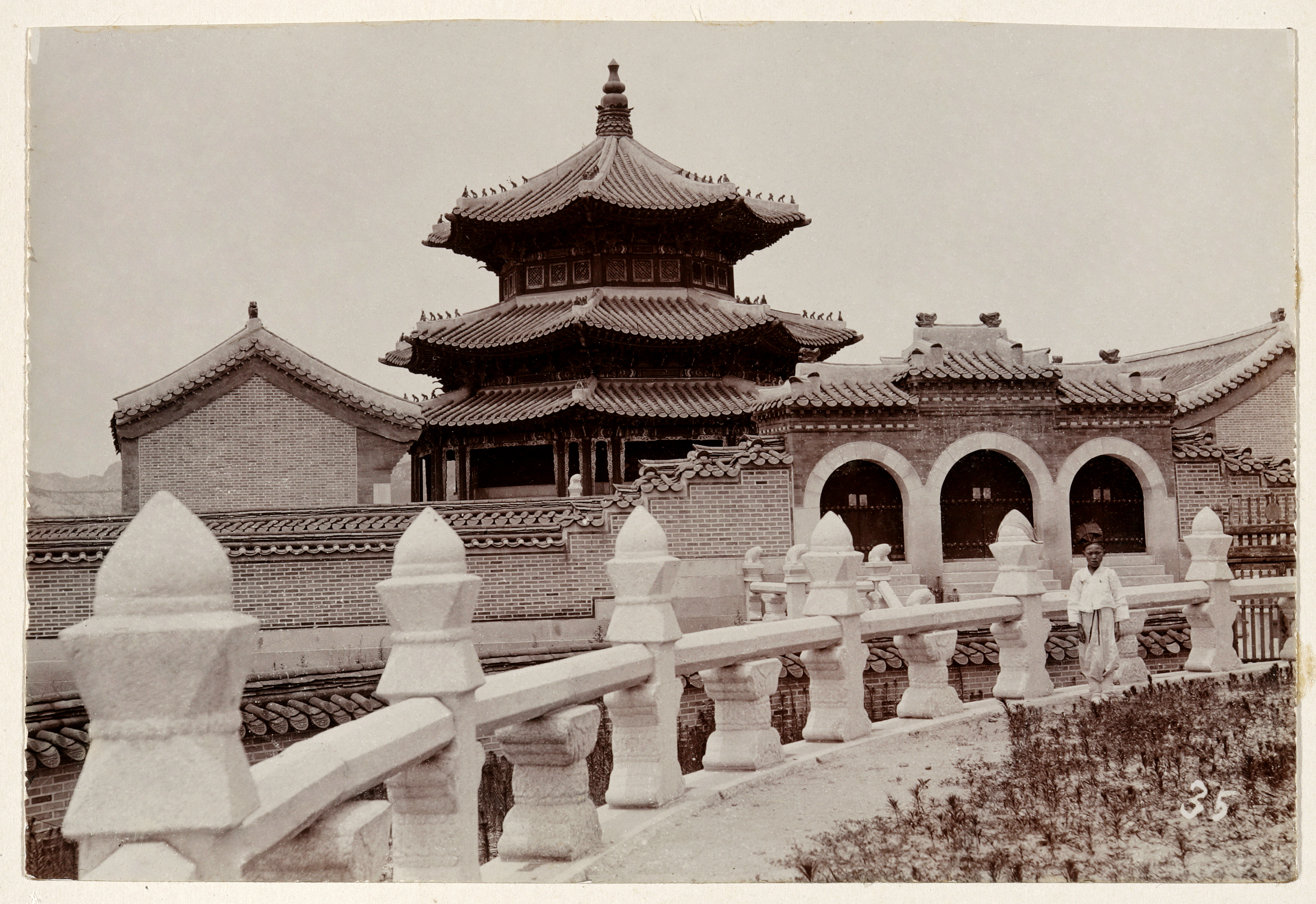
Hwangudan (1906)

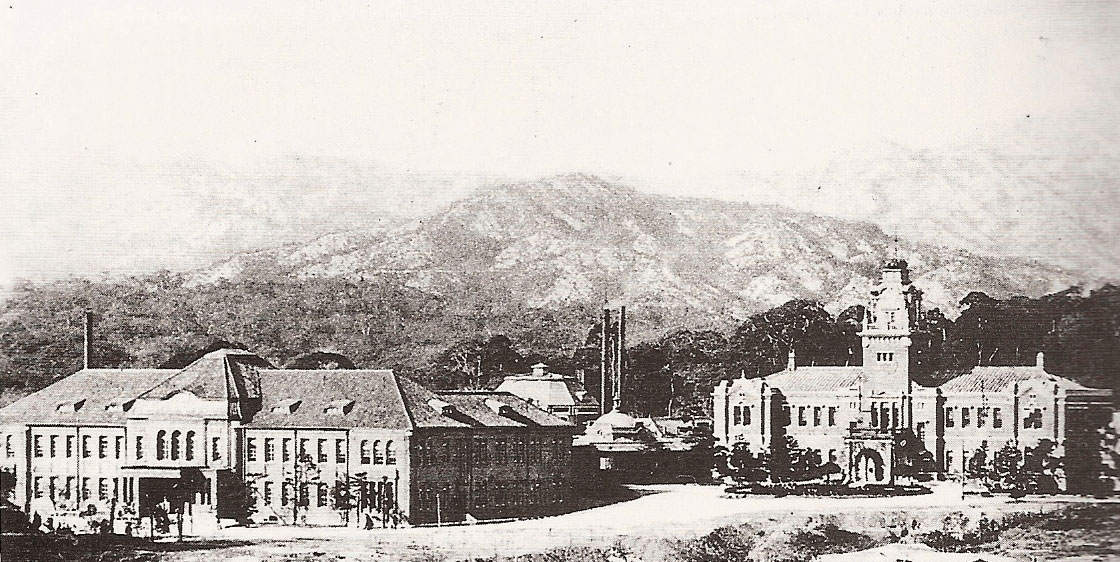
Taehan Hospital of Seoul during the Gwangmu Reform

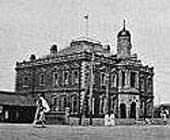
Seoul Electric Company Building, built in 1901.

== Japanese colonial period ==
Emblem of Keijō, 1925–1945

James A. FitzPatrick-produced documentary short film about life in Seoul c. 1931

Seoul in the 1920s

When the Empire of Japan annexed the Korean Empire, it made Seoul the colonial capital. While under colonial rule (1910–1945), the city was called Keijō (京城); (Korean: 경성; RR: Gyeongseong; MR: Kyŏngsŏng, literally meaning "capital city" in Hanja.). Keijō was an urban city (부/府) that had 2 wards: Keijō itself and Ryusan-ku (龍山區, 용산구, りゅうさんく). Gyeongseong was part of Gyeonggi Province, instead of being an independent city or prefecture as in Joseon and present days. In 1914, several outer districts of the prefecture were annexed to neighboring Goyang County (now Goyang City), reducing the administrative size of the prefecture. In 1936, Gyeongseong expanded itself as it annexed Yeongdeungpo from Siehung County (Now Siehung City) and recombined some parts of former Gyeongseong districts (Sungin, Yeonghee, etc.) from Goyang County. The Government-General Building served as the seat of the colonial government of Colonial Korea but was torn down in 1995.

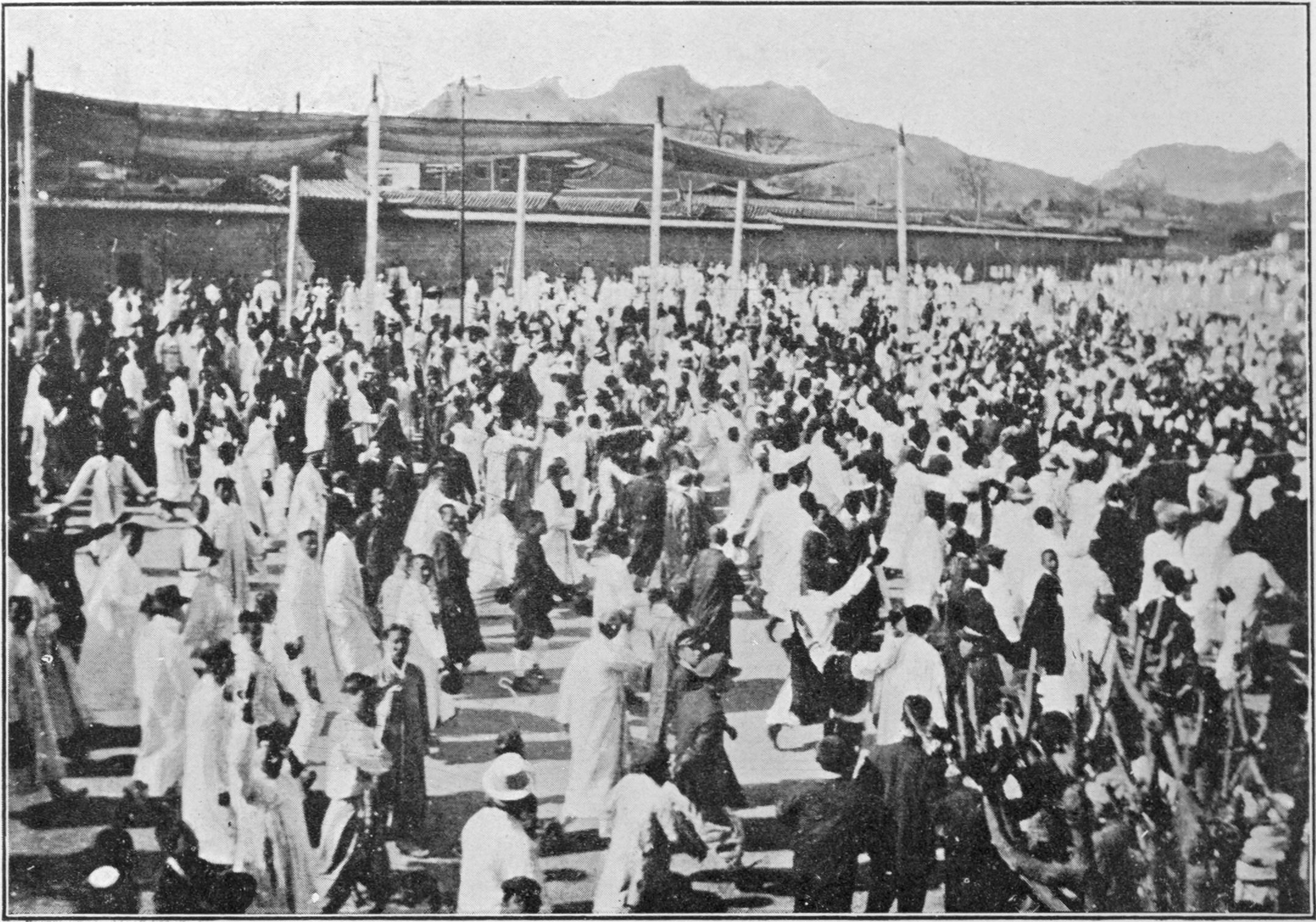
March 1st Movement, 1919

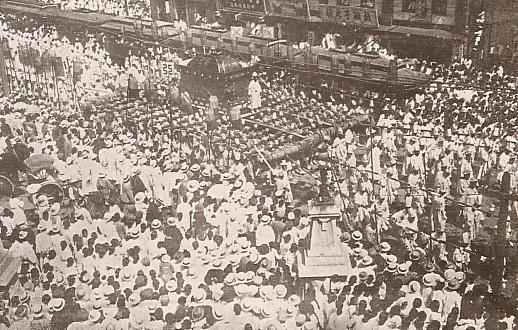
Funeral for Emperor Sunjong, 10 June 1926

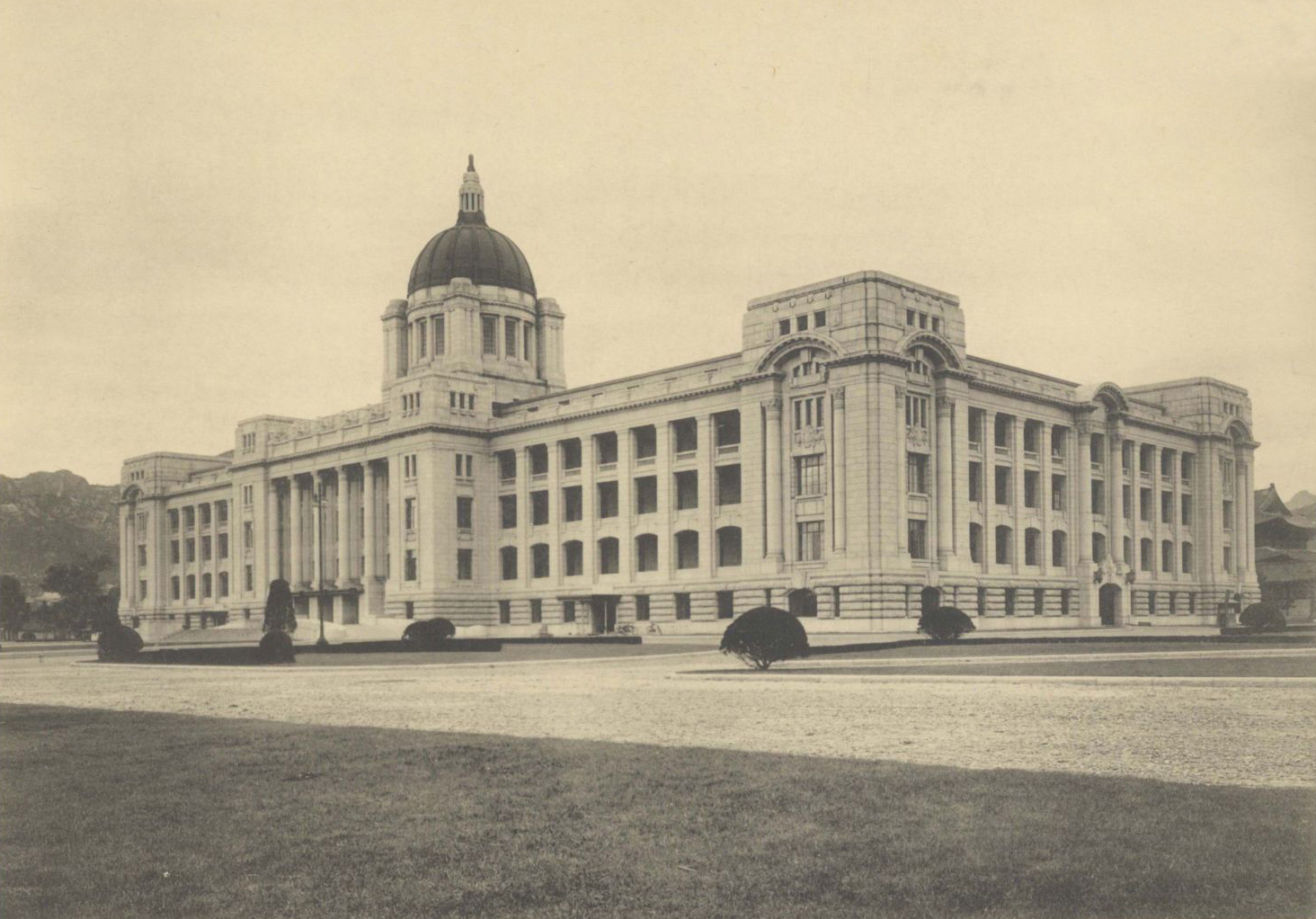
Government-General Building, built in 1926

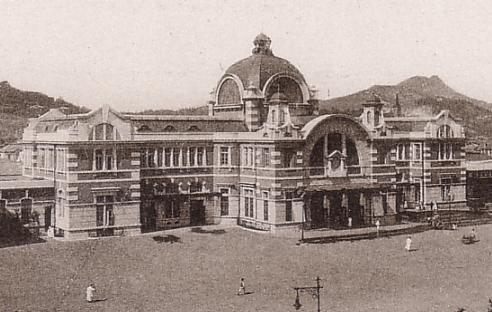
Keijo Station (currently Seoul Station)

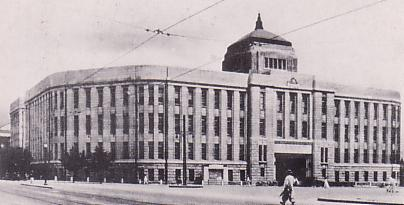
Keijo City Hall (currently Seoul Metropolitan Library)

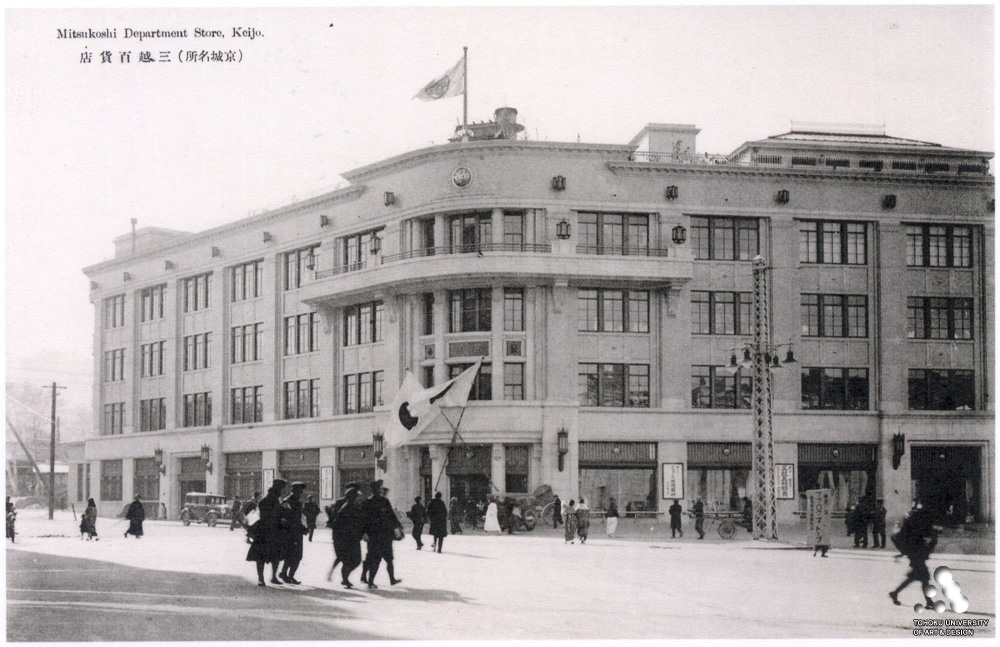
Mitsukoshi department store (now Shinsegae Main store)

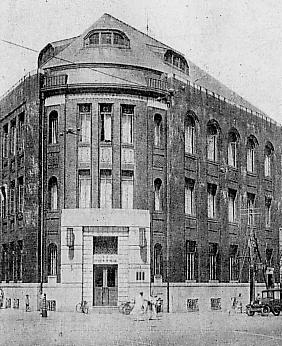
Chosen Commercial Bank Head Office

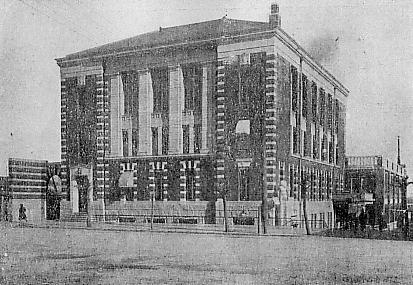
Keijō Nippō (京城日報) Company Building

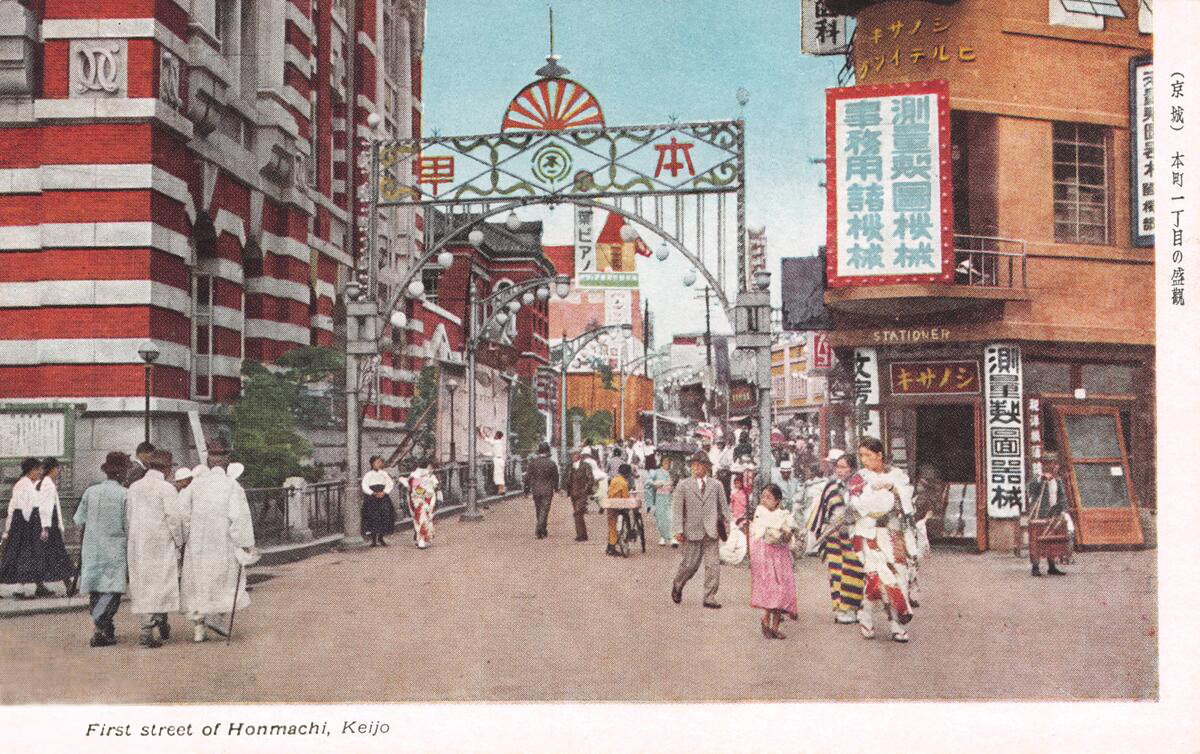
Gate of Hommachi, Japanese main residence area

== Modern history ==
Flag of Seoul (1946–1996)

After World War II and Korea's liberation, the city took its present name of Seoul. When the Republic of Korea (South Korea) was declared, the new state adopted the city as its capital. In 1949, Seoul administrative area expanded to Ui-dong to the north, and Guro-dong and Daerim-dong to the south, recombining some areas which were annexed from original Seoul to Goyang County in 1914.

In 1950, the Korean War broke out and Seoul changed hands between the North Korean forces and South Korean forces four times, leaving the city largely destroyed at the end of the war. One estimate of the extensive damage states that at least 191,000 buildings, 55,000 houses, and 1,000 factories lay in ruins. In addition, there were a flood of refugees from the North, swelling the city's population to an estimated 2.5 million persons. More than half of them were homeless.

The government considered moving its capital city to Yeongdeungpo and Bupyeong, which are south of the Han River.

Following the war, Seoul became the focus of an immense reconstruction and modernization effort. Rapid economic growth achieved during the industrialization of the 1960s and 1970s raised living standards of residents considerably in Seoul.

In 1963, Seoul greatly expanded in size by annexing a number of towns and villages from several surrounding counties in Gyeonggi Province, such as Bucheon, Siheung, Gwangju, Yangju, and Gimpo. However, many newly annexed districts were still rural until Gangnam area began to be developed into urban neighborhoods from the late 1970s. At the same time, Gwacheon Township (today's Gwacheon city) and the northern part of West Township (today's Gwangmyeong city) in Siheung County, parts of Ojeong Township in Bucheon County, and Sindo Township in Goyang County were also annexed to the Seoul Metropolitan Urban Planning Districts (서울특별시 도시계획구역), taking these areas as provisional districts for further official municipal annexation to Seoul in the future. In 1973, some parts of Sindo Township in Goyang County (today's Jingwan-dong in the Eunpyeong District) were officially annexed to Seoul. The remaining parts of Sindo Township, Goyang and the northern part of West Township, Siheung (today's Gwangmyeong City) were provisionally planned to be annexed to Seoul, but the municipal annexation plan foundered in the end, in which the symbolic event for this was the establishment of Gwangmyeong City (other than annexation to Guro-gu) in 1981, as the rapid growth of Seoul City was a great concern for governmental officials.

High-rise office buildings and apartments began sprouting throughout the city during the construction boom of the 1980s. Pollution and traffic jams became major issues as urbanization in the country accelerated and more and more people began moving to Seoul and its surrounding areas. Despite a green belt established around the city to prevent urban sprawl, the Seoul metropolitan area soon became the third largest in the world in terms of population and one of the most crowded.

Seoul was the host city of the 1988 Summer Olympics as well as one of the venues of the 2002 FIFA World Cup.

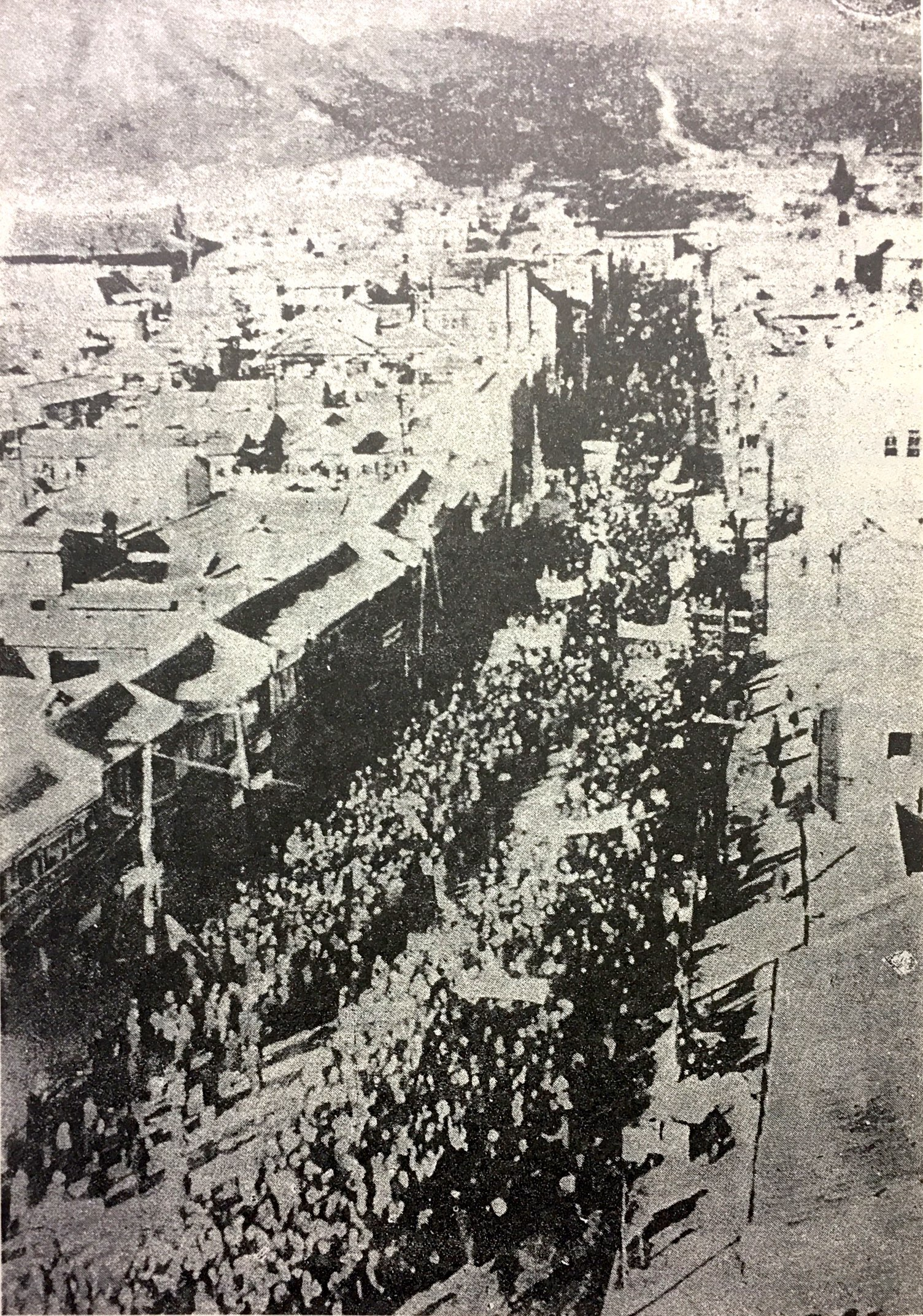
In front of Seoul Station, 15 August 1945 (Liberation of Korea)

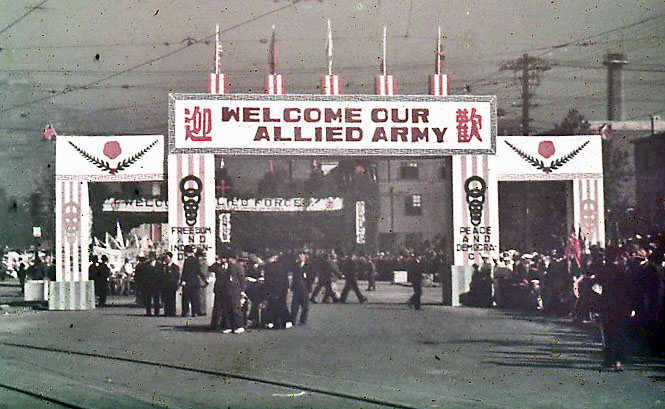
Korean welcomes Allied army, early October 1945

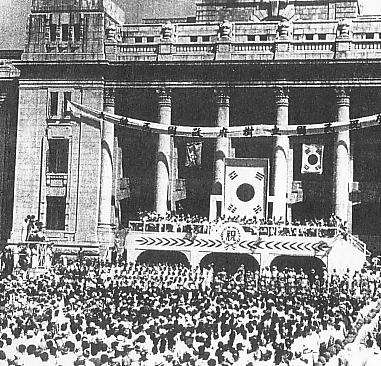
Ceremony inaugurating the government of the Republic of Korea, 15 August 1948

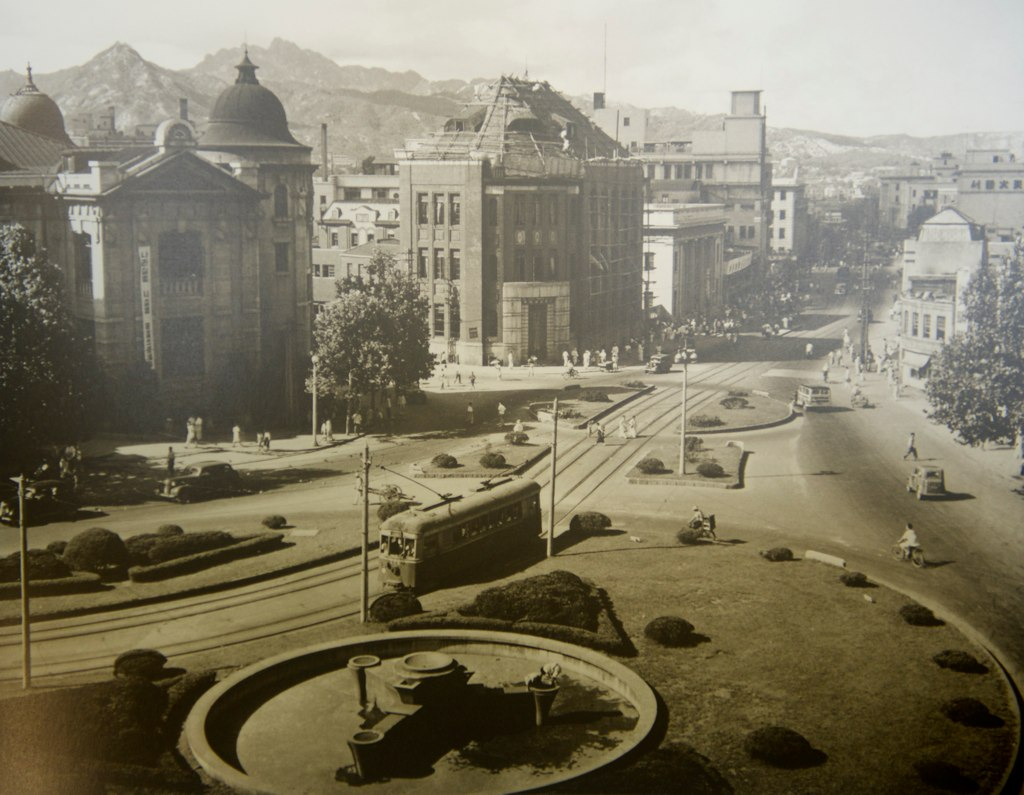
In front of the Bank of Korea, June 1950

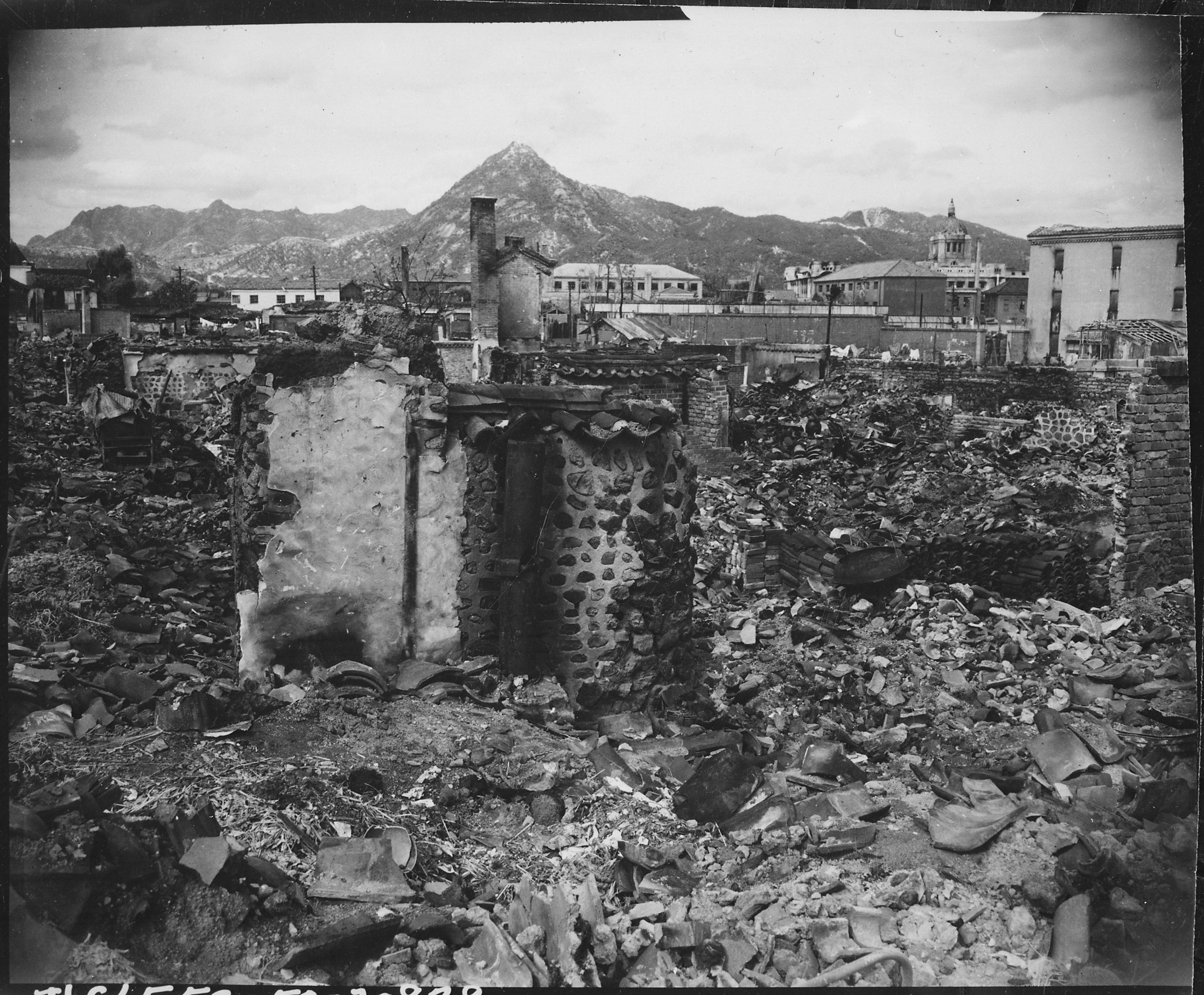
Scene of war damage in residential section of Seoul. The capitol building can be seen in the background (right). 18 October 1950.

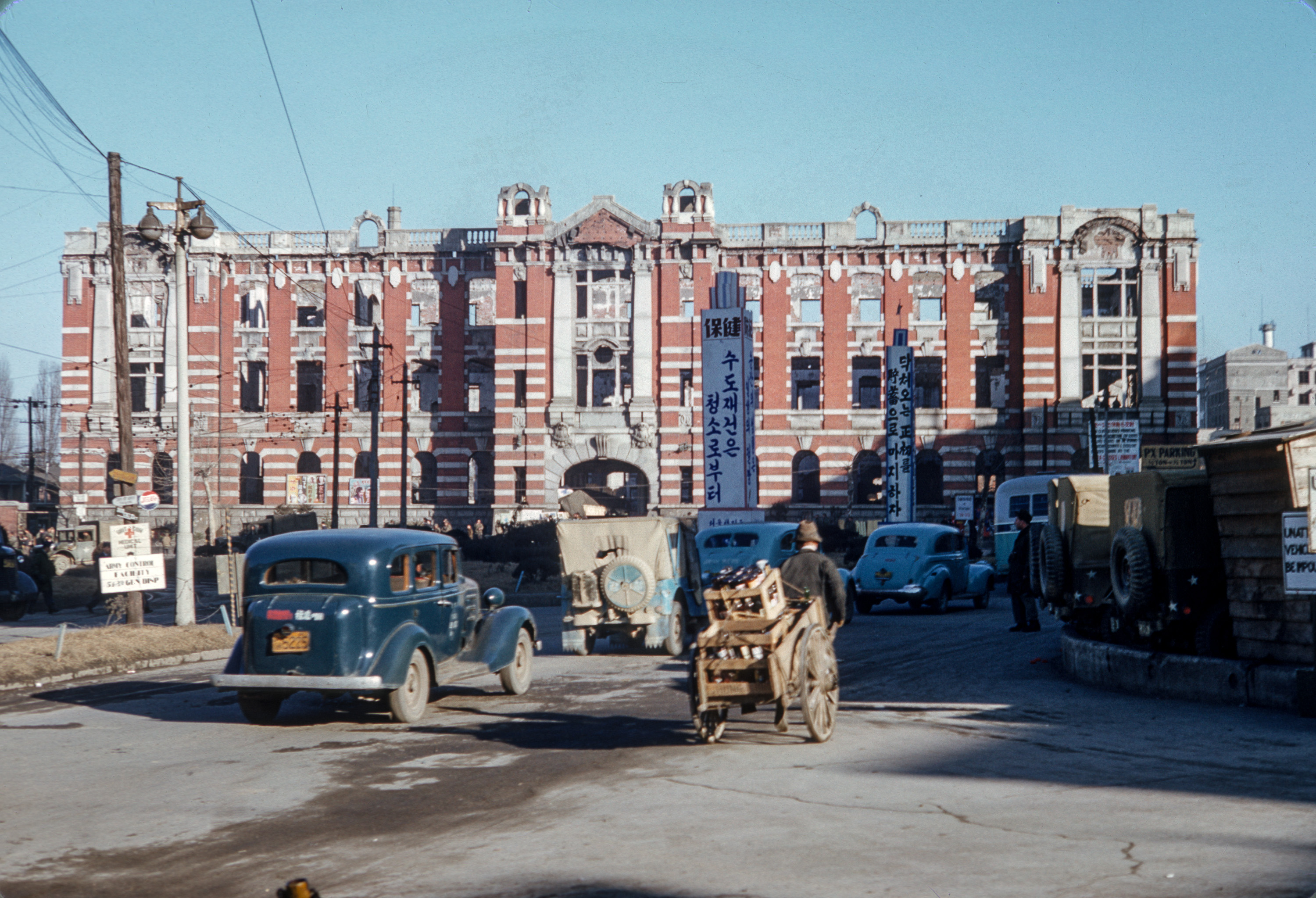
The old Central Post Office, 1954 (demolished 1957)

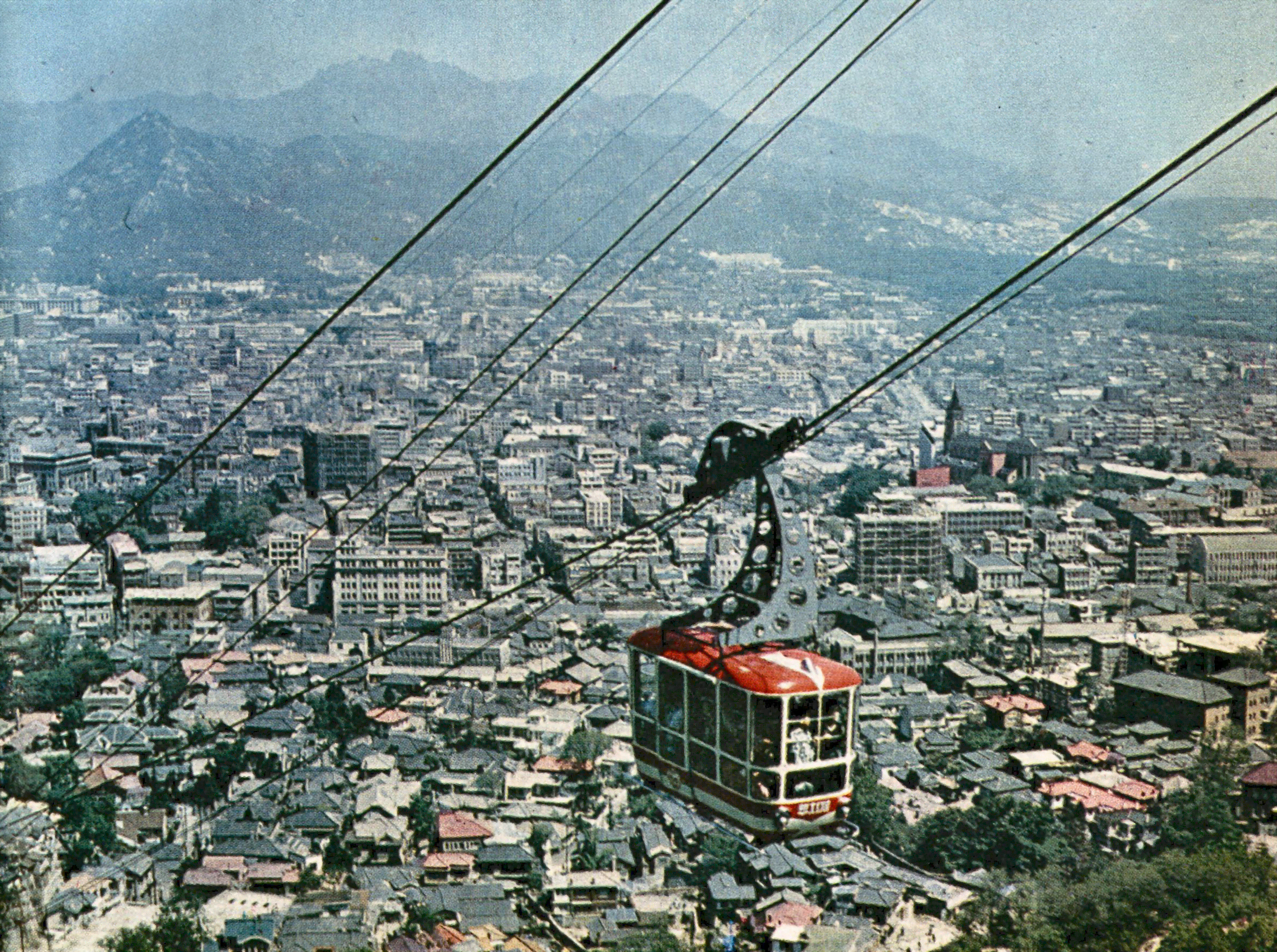
Bird's eye view of Seoul from the Namsan cablecar, 1962

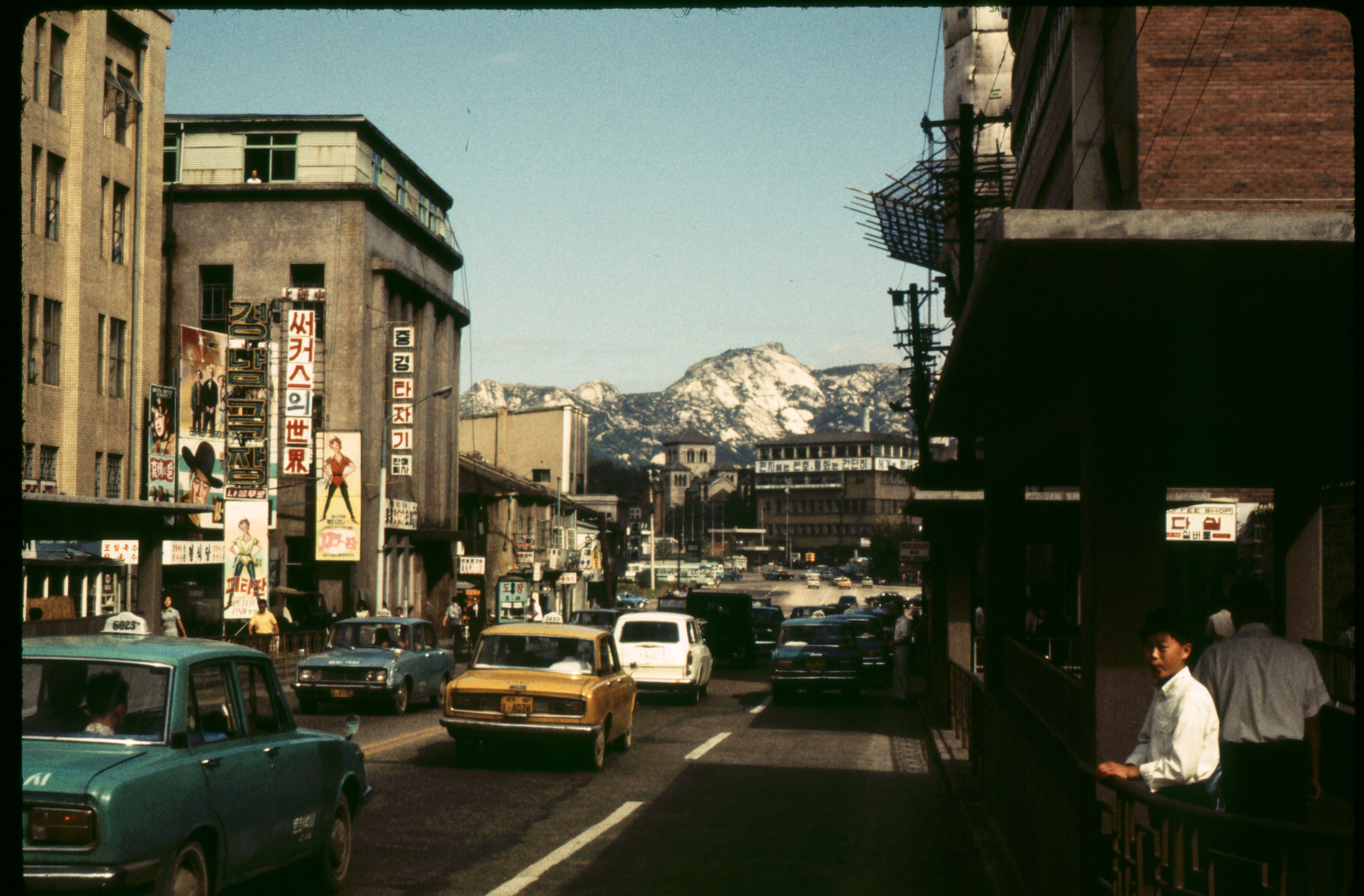
Sogong-dong, Seoul, August 1970

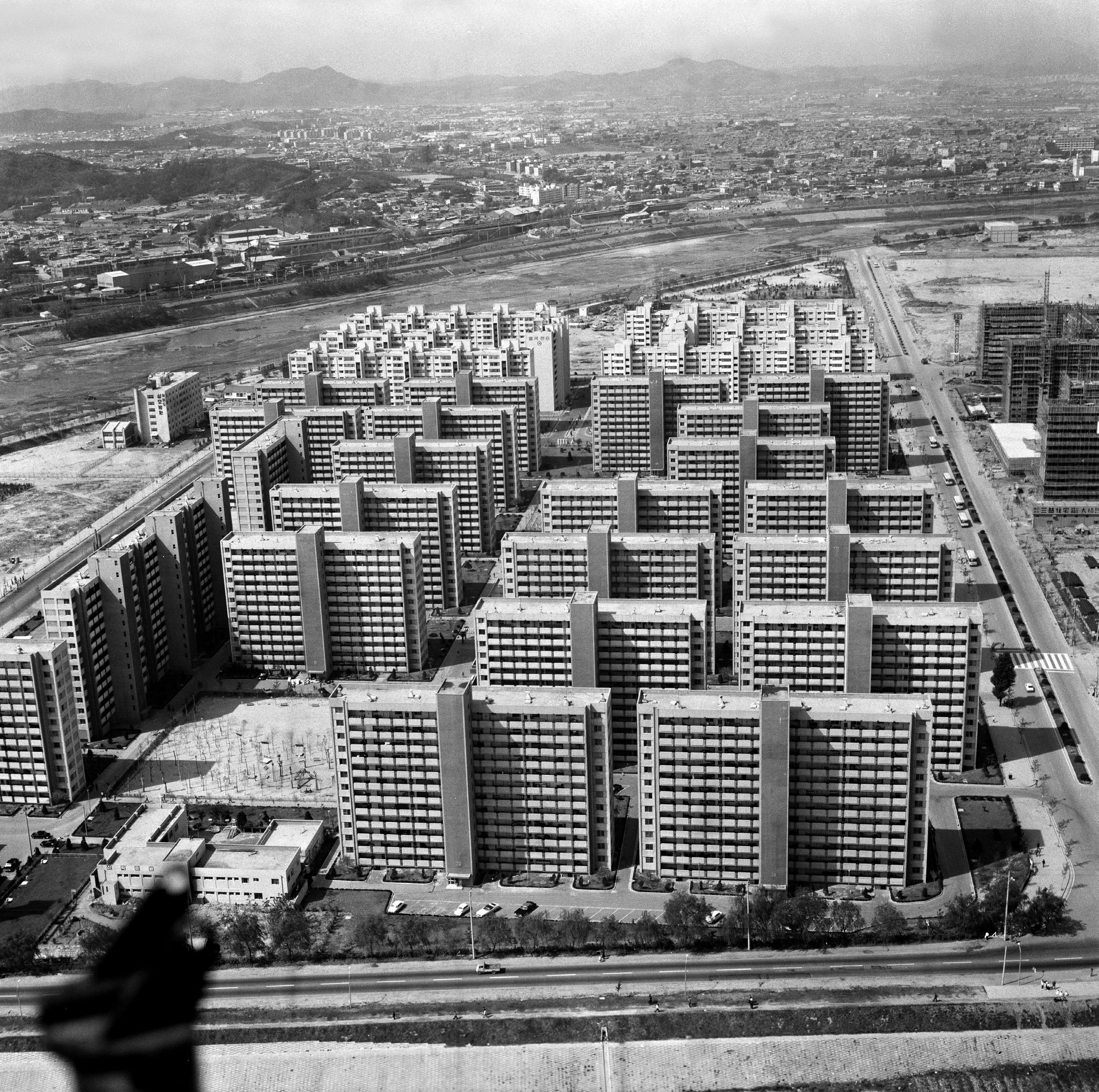
Yeouido apartment buildings, 1975

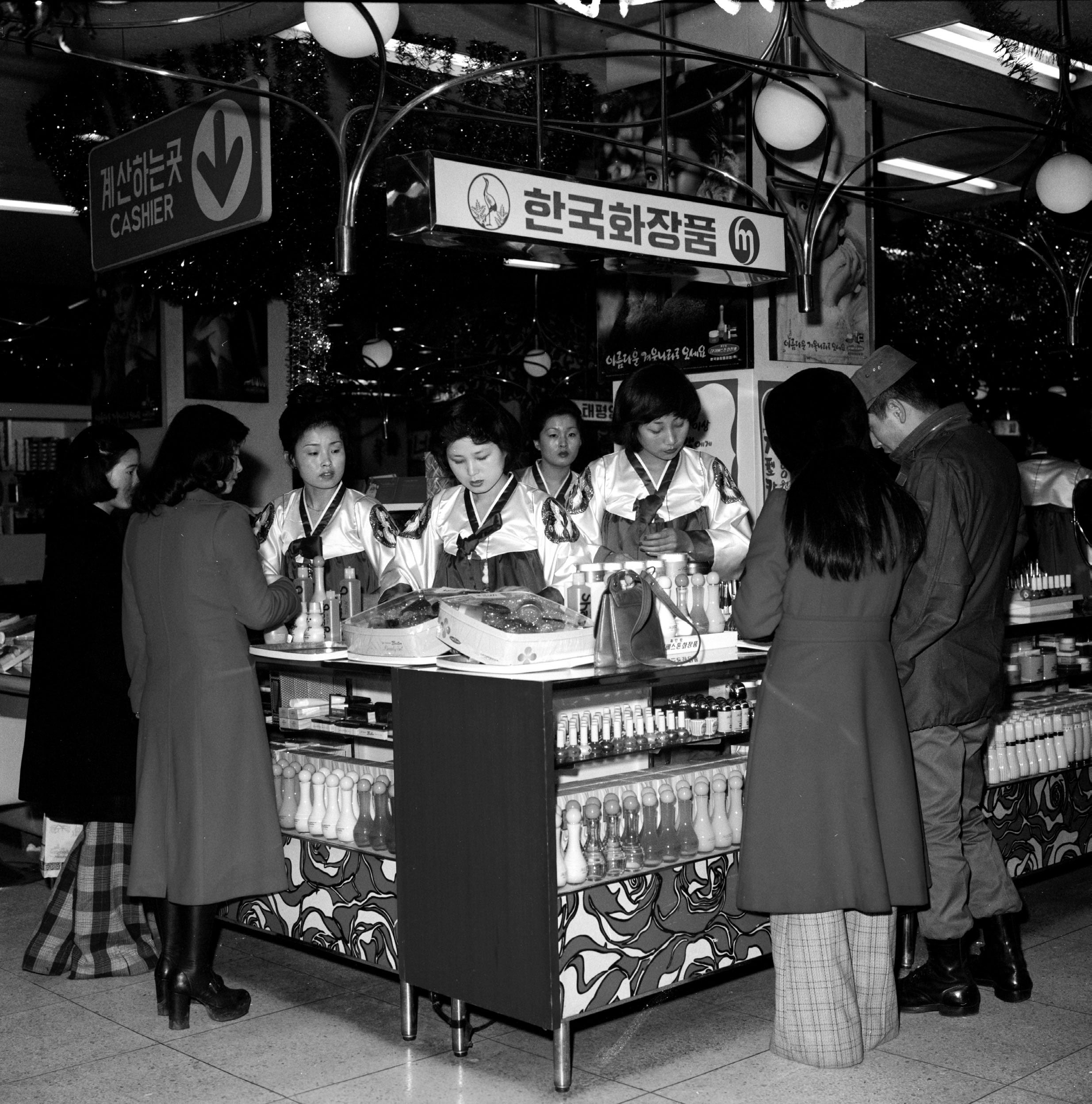
Midopa department store, 24 December 1975

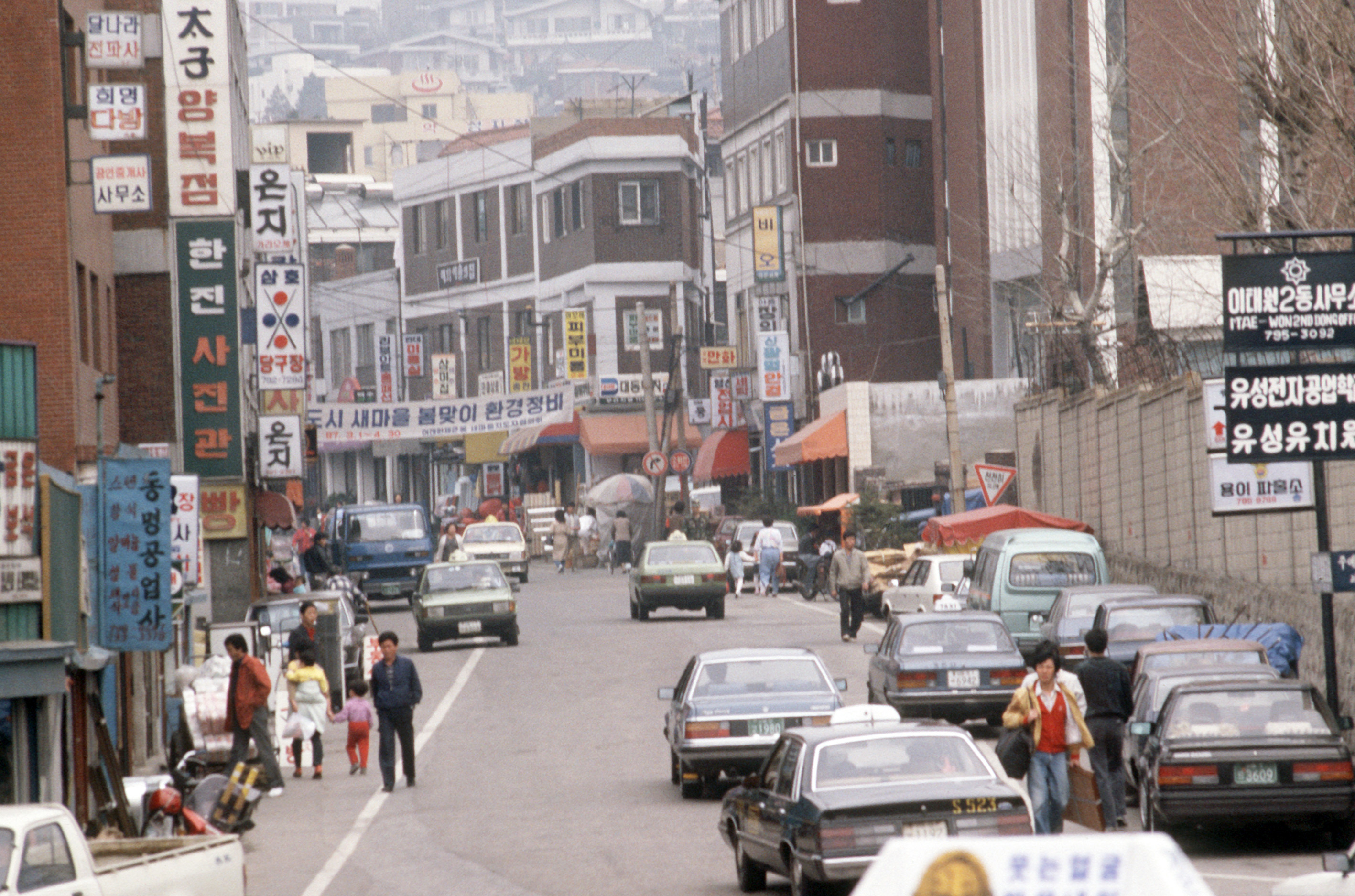
Itaewon-dong, 1986

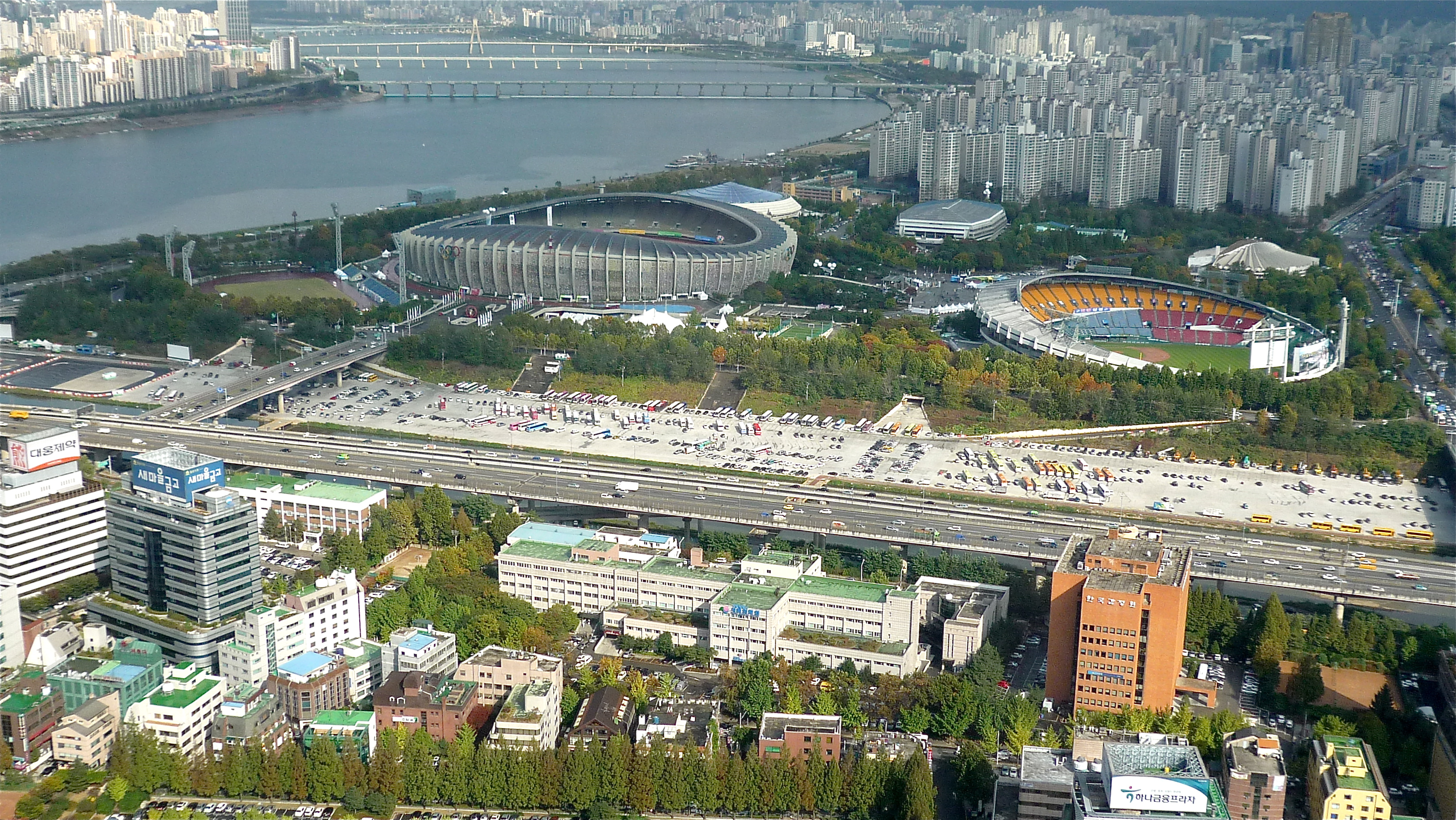
Seoul Olympic Stadium, built for the 1988 Summer Olympics and the 10th Asian Games in 1986

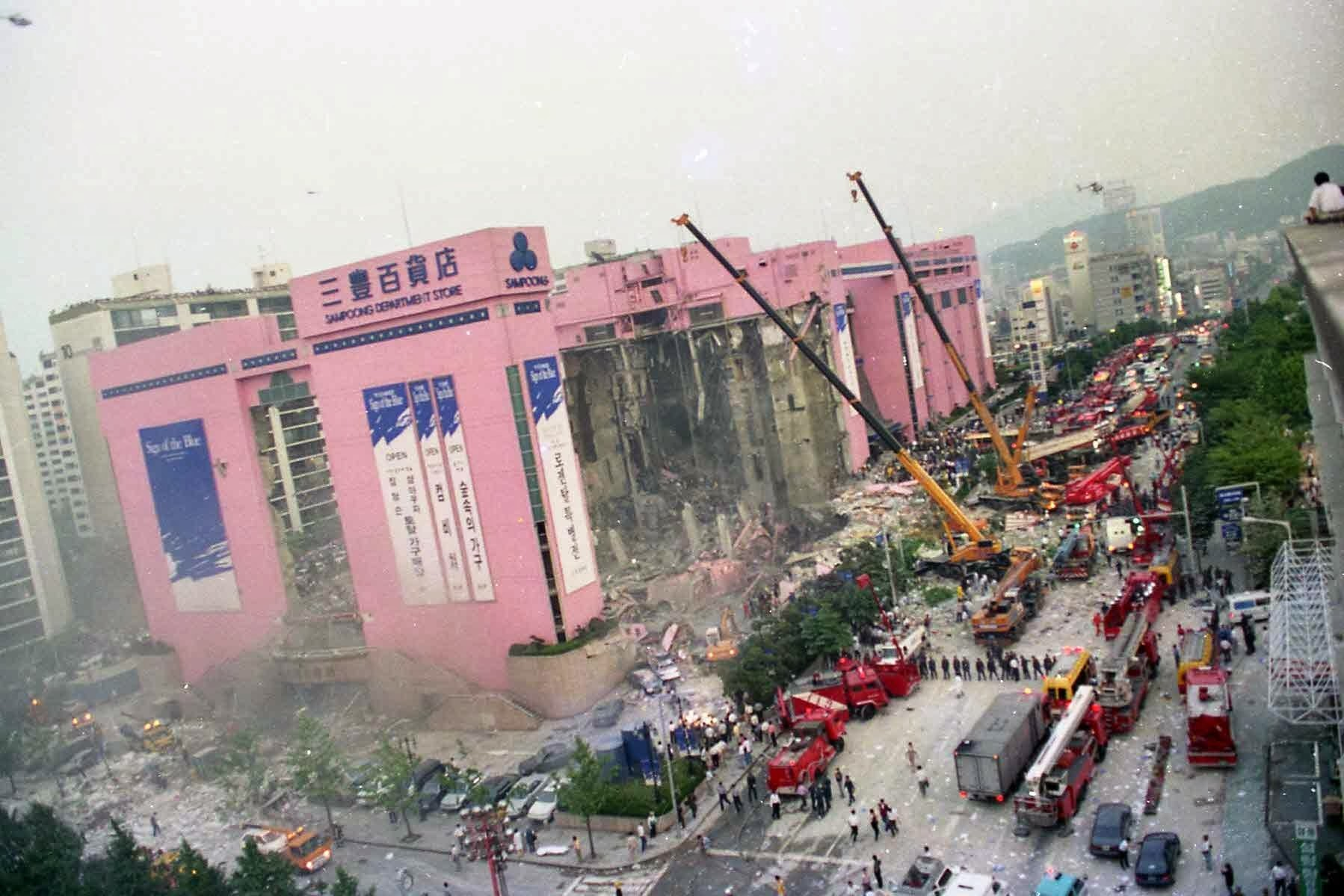
Sampoong Department Store collapse, 1995

Young people watching the 2002 FIFA World Cup

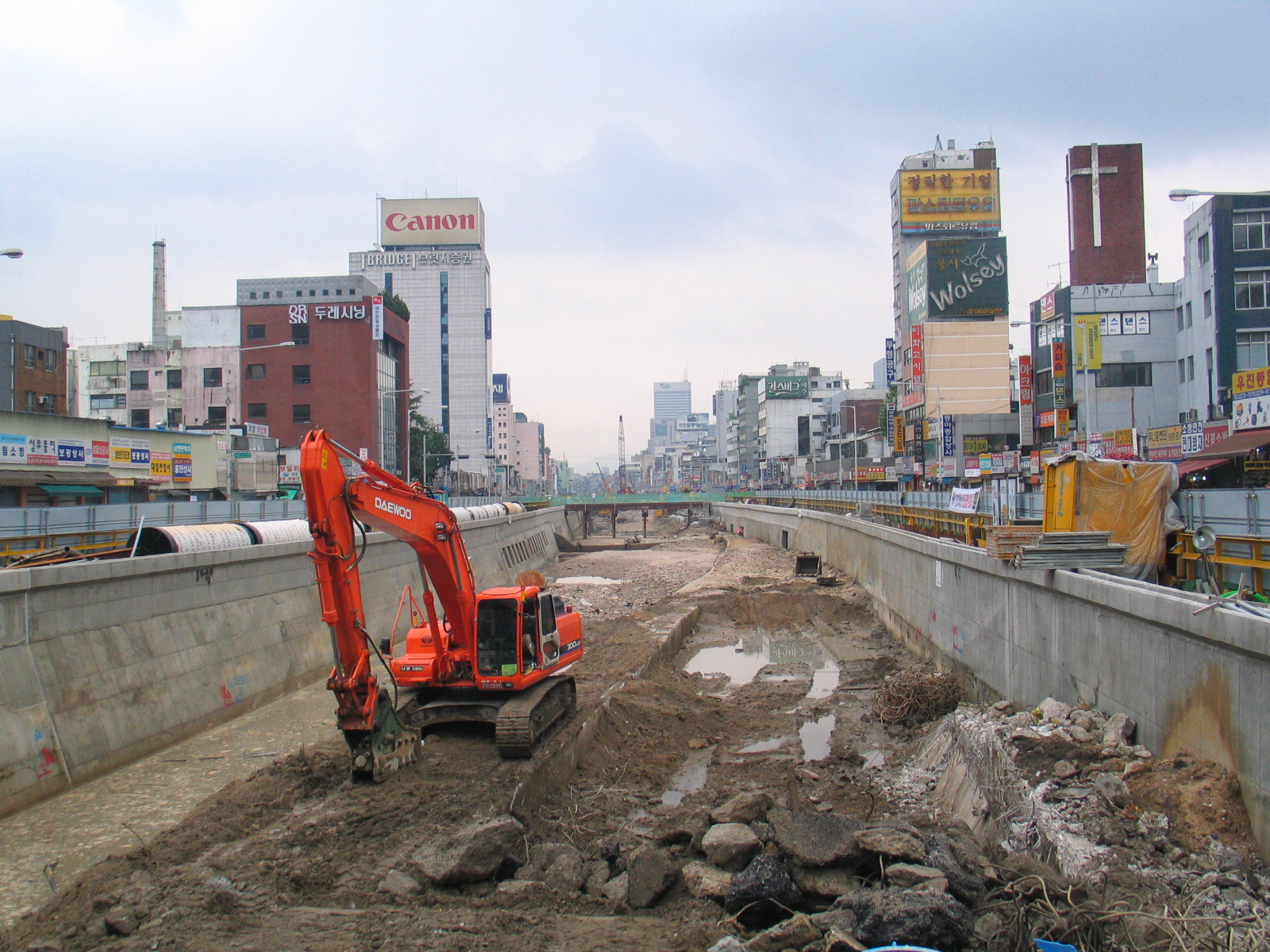
Cheonggyecheon under construction, 2004

Today, the population of the Seoul area comprises 20% of the total population of South Korea.

During the 1990s, the city began to attract many workers from other countries, changing demographics. Previously, nearly all of Seoul's residents were Korean. Today, there are an estimated 200,000 foreign nationals living in Seoul. These include tens of thousands of English teachers from the United States, Canada, United Kingdom, Australia, New Zealand, and other English-speaking countries, as well as laborers from Bangladesh, China, India, Indonesia, Mongolia, Nigeria, Pakistan, the Philippines, Uzbekistan, and Vietnam.

In 1995, the boundary between Seoul and Gwangmyeong rearrangement was implemented, merging parts of Cheolsan 3-dong, Gwangmyeong in the Geumcheon District of Seoul. Around the time of the 1995 municipal annexation in South Korea, the government once seriously considered a division of Seoul into several municipal or metropolitan cities, but the division plan foundered as it would be expected to cause serious problems in aspects of metropolitan governance in Seoul.

In the same year, a building collapse killed over 500 people in Seoul, mainly due to rushed construction, lack of evacuation, and selfish management by the owners. The collapse caused outrage across the country, and it was almost entirely preventable.

In addition, there are many language instructors from English-speaking countries such as Canada, Australia, New Zealand, South Africa, United States, and the UK. As a major business and financial center, Seoul also has many executives and analysts from North America, Europe, and Japan. Seoul ranks seventh in the world in terms of the number of Fortune 500 transnational companies headquartered there. It is also the world's second most expensive city, ahead of Tokyo and Hong Kong (ranked 3rd and 4th, respectively).

On 29 October 2022, a crowd crush ended up killing at least 156 people, including at least 19 foreign nationals.

=== Failed relocation of the capital ===
On 11 August 2004, the South Korean government announced they would relocate the capital city from Seoul to the Gongju area as of 2007, to ease population pressure on Seoul and to get the government to a safer distance from North Korea in case of a Northern military invasion. Gongju is approximately 120 km (75 mi) south of Seoul. The Government estimated that the move would probably not be completed before 2012. Although part of the election manifesto, this plan ignited nationwide controversy. On 21 October 2004, the Constitutional Court of Korea ruled that mostly based on custom law, the special law for the relocation of the capital is unconstitutional since the relocation is a serious national matter requiring national referendum or revision of the constitution, thus effectively ending the dispute.

In late 2004, however, the South Korean government announced plans to move most of the national government branches, except the Executive Branch, to Gongju, thus evading violation of the Constitutional Court ruling and still allow Seoul to be a National Capital. Since this plan was supported by the late president Roh Moo-hyun and bitterly opposed by the current ruling party and the former president (Lee Myung-bak – the former mayor of Seoul) the planned move was scaled back dramatically when Lee Myung-bak took office. As of 2011, some preliminary work has begun on construction of new government buildings in the Gongju area. No government agencies want to move away from the center of power in Seoul, so which agencies will be forced to move is the subject of intense behind-the-scenes debate.

Sejong City was founded in 2007 as part of efforts to relocate the national capital. It was created from territory of South Chungcheong and North Chungcheong provinces to ease congestion in Seoul and encourage investment in the country's central region. Since 2012, the Government of South Korea has relocated numerous ministries and agencies to Sejong, but many still reside in other cities - namely Seoul where the National Assembly, the Blue House and many important government bodies remain.

== See also ==
- History of Korea
- Names of Seoul
- Timeline of Seoul history
