= Monument for the 40th Anniversary of King Gojong's Enthronement =

Historic pavilion in Seoul, South Korea

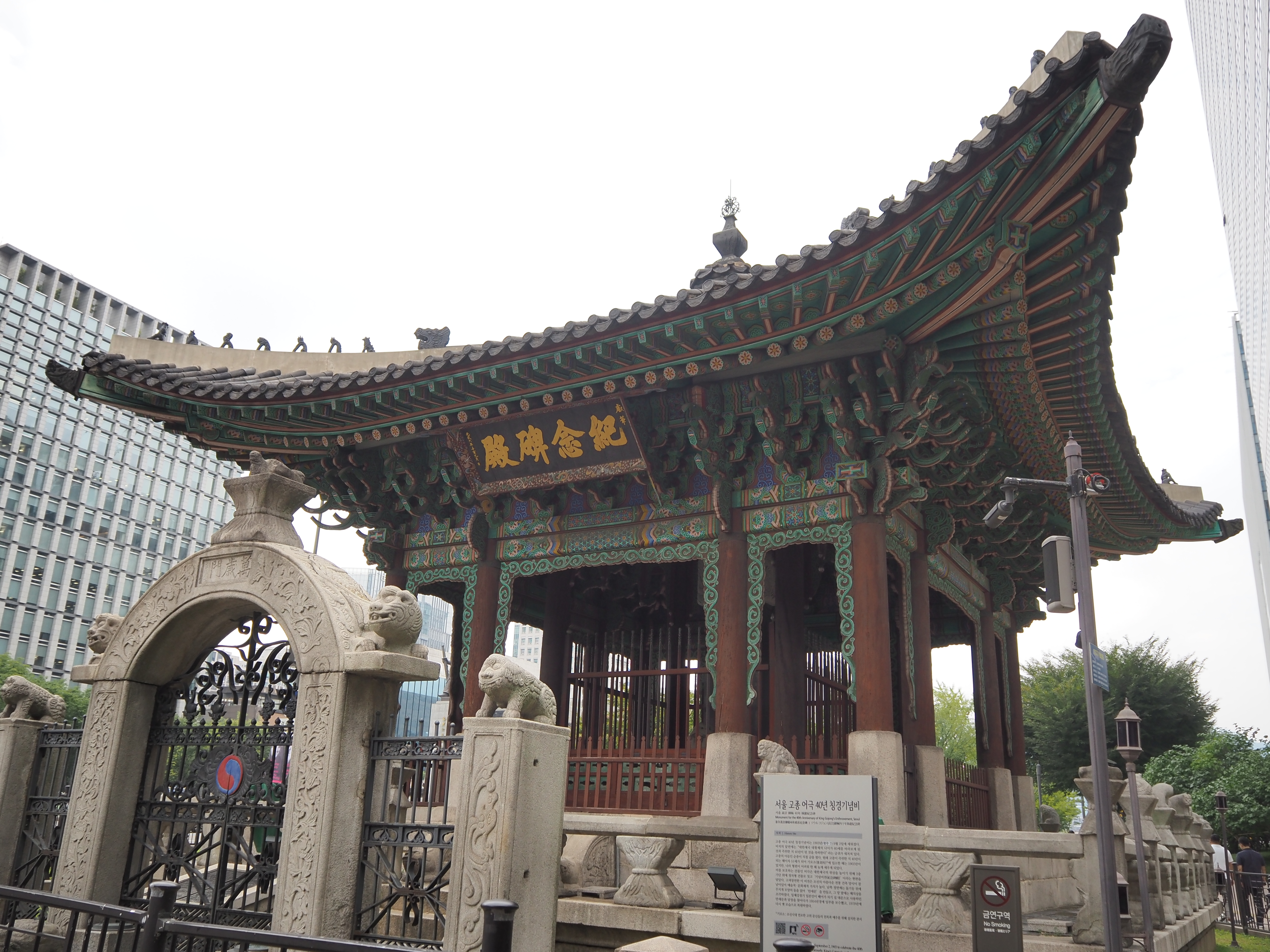
- The monument (2024)
- Interactive map of Monument for the 40th Anniversary of King Gojong's Enthronement
- Location: Jongno District, Seoul, South Korea
- Coordinates: 37°34′14″N 126°58′39″E
- Completion date: 1902
- Dedicated to: Gojong of Korea

Historic Sites of South Korea
- Designated: 1969-07-18
- Reference no.: 171

Korean name
- Hangul: 고종 어극 40년 칭경기념비
- Hanja: 高宗御極四十年稱慶紀念碑
- Revised Romanization: Gojong eogeuk 40nyeon chinggyeongginyeombi
- McCune–Reischauer: Kojong ŏgŭk 40nyŏn ch'inggyŏngginyŏmbi

Alternate name
- Hangul: 비각
- Hanja: 碑閣
- Revised Romanization: Bigak
- McCune–Reischauer: Pigak

Monument for the 40th Anniversary of King/Emperor Gojong's Enthronement (Korean: 고종 어극 40년 칭경기념비; Hanja: 高宗御極四十年稱慶紀念碑), also called Bigak (비각; 碑閣), is a pavilion near Gwanghwamun in central Seoul. The pavilion was built in 1902 to commemorate the 40th anniversary (Ruby jubilee) of Emperor Gojong’s coronation and his 50th birthday, as well as the founding in 1897 of the Korean Empire.

== See also ==
- Gwanghwamun
