= Joya no Kane =

Japanese Buddhist bell-ringing ceremony

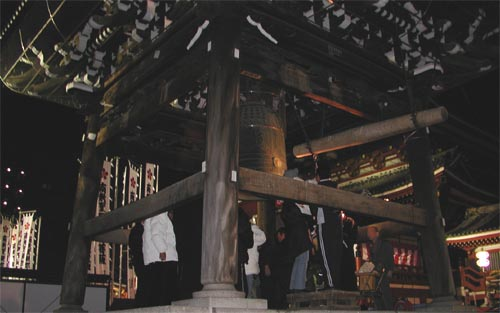
Visitors ring the bell at Ōsu Kannon in Nagoya

Joya no Kane (除夜の鐘) lit. 'new year's eve bell' is a Japanese Buddhist event held annually on New Year's Eve. The bell, or bonshō, is struck at midnight of December 31, as a part of the Ōmisoka celebrations. Most temples ring the bell 108 times. It is celebrated mainly in Japan, but also in South Korea and at Japanese Buddhist temples around the world.

Bell ringing at Chomei-ji in Shiga

Video of bell ringing

== Joya no Kane in Japan ==
=== History ===
The custom of ringing the temple bell 108 times in Zen temples originated in the Zen temples of the Song dynasty in China. The custom was introduced to Japanese Zen temples during the Kamakura period (1185-1333), and at that time the temple bells were rung 108 times in the morning and evening each day. In the Muromachi period (1333-1573), the ringing of the temple bell 108 times in Zen temples became an event unique to Japanese Zen temples, held only on New Year's Eve, and was established as "Joya no kane". In Zen temples it is performed at midnight on New Year's Eve to ward off bad luck from the northeastern direction (see Devil's gate (superstition)).

Joya no Kane was a haiku theme in the Edo period, but it was not until the 1930s that it was adopted as a kigo (haiku season word) and became a more common haiku theme.

According to Hirayama Noboru of Kanagawa University, the custom of Joya no Kane was mostly forgotten by the Meiji era, but it spread throughout Japan again in the early Showa era through radio broadcasts. In 1927, two years after the first radio station was opened in Japan, JOAK, the predecessor of NHK, began broadcasting a radio program "Joya no Kane". For the first two years, a Buddhist bell set up in the studio rang in the New Year, but in 1929, the program was broadcast live from a temple. The first live broadcast was from Senso-ji Temple. This program led to the spread of Joya no Kane not only to Zen temples, but also to temples of various Buddhist sects throughout Japan. The records of Chion-in, the head temple of the Jodo-shu sect (the predecessor of Jodo Shinshu), show that the earliest occurrence of Joya no Kane dates to 1928 or 1929, after the initial radio broadcast. In 1955, the program was renamed "Yuku Toshi Kuru Toshi" (Going Year, Coming Year) and began to be broadcast on television, where it continues to this day.

In 1941, Japan officially entered the Second World War. On December 25, the Japanese military had won the Battle of Hong Kong. That year, instead of broadcasting Joya no Kane, NHK played a recording of a cannon fired during the attack. As the Japanese position in the war deteriorated, many temples were ordered to hand over their bells to be scrapped for metal, leaving those temples without the ability to conduct Joya no Kane. Some of these temples replaced their bell with a taiko drum.

Since the late 2010s, due to both trends of aging amongst the monks and neighbors complaining of noise pollution, some temples have chosen to stop ringing the bells on midnight of New Year's Eve. In the course of this debate there are those who argue that it is not noise pollution, while others argue that because of its popularization in the age of radio, it isn't such a precise tradition that needs to be conducted at midnight. Ryukoku-ji in Namerikawa decided to move Joya no Kane to 2 pm as of 2021, taking into consideration the decrease in pilgrims due to the aging population of Japan and the danger from snow and ice on the steps to reach the bell.

=== Origin of 108 ===
Joya no Kane consists of 108 bell ringings at most temples. There are several possible explanations for the origins of the number 108, listed below, but there is no one correct answer. Some temples, especially those which allow laypeople to participate in ringing the bell, may go past 108 ringings, either with multiples of 108 or simply going to 200 or more.

==== Number of worldly sins ====
In Buddhism, there are 108 sins known as kleshas or bonnou (煩悩) in Japanese. These 108 are derived from the six senses (Āyatana) of sight, hearing, smell, taste, body, and mind. Each sense has three variations: pleasant, unpleasant, and even. These 18 variations have two further kinds: pure and impure. From those 36, there are three lifetimes to divide between: the past life, present life, and next life, for a total of 108 kleshas.

==== Four and eight kinds of suffering ====
One classification of dukkha identifies four kinds of suffering: birth, old age, disease, and death. Then, another four kinds of suffering are added: separation from loved ones, meeting of unpleasant ones, not getting what one seeks, and the pain of the five skandhas. Both 4 and 8 are multiplied by 9 and added to sum to 108. This explanation is attested in multiple sources, although the source of the 9 is not explained.

==== Divisions of the year ====
In the traditional Japanese calendar, there are 12 months, 24 solar terms, and 72 microseasons (3 per solar term). When each of these three are summed, the total is 108.

=== Sects ===
Joya no Kane originally began as a Zen Buddhist practice. However, during the Showa Period, it spread throughout Japan through radio relay broadcasting.

Some temples in the Jodo Shinshu sect also ring their bells, but according to the Higashi Hongan-ji temple, the head temple of the Otani-ha sect of Jodo Shinshu, does not practice Joya no Kane, stating that the founder Shinran Shonin did not think that sins were something that are paid for. Similarly, the Nishi Hongan-ji temple, the head temple of the Honganji-ha sect of Jodo Shinshu, rings bells before services and to pray for peace but does not conduct Joya no Kane.

=== Etiquette ===
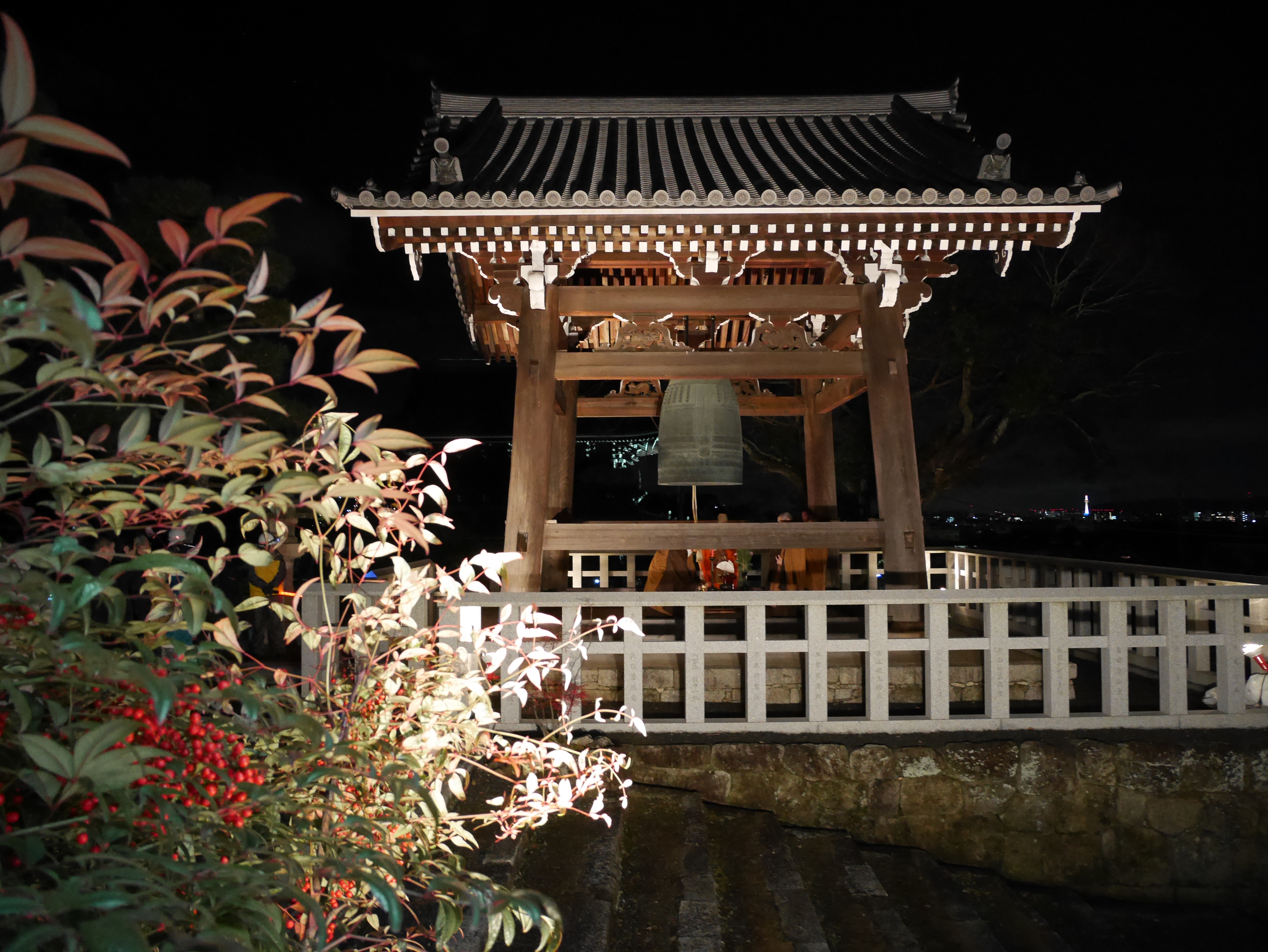

Before ringing the bell, participants place their hands in gassho while facing the bell.

In terms of schedule, some temples straddle the both years, while others only start ringing after midnight. Temples which start before midnight, usually do so at 11 pm or later. For temples which conduct 108 ringings, some strike the bell 107 times during the old years and save the remaining hit for the new year. Temples which only start ringing after midnight include Zojo-ji, Senso-ji, and Narita-san Shinsho-ji.

== Outside of Japan ==
=== Korea ===
It is also celebrated to some extent in South Korea, where the tradition was started at Bosingak. Instead of repeating it 108 times, they ring the bell 33 times, originating from the Trāyastriṃśa. It has been broadcast on the radio since 1929 and since 1956 on TV.

During the Joseon Dynasty, when the gates surrounding Seoul were closed each night, the bell in Bosingak was rung 28 times, and then rung 33 times in the morning when the gates were opened again. At the time, this practice was completed unrelated to Buddhism or Joya no Kane. The nightly bell ringing was discontinued in 1895 as part of the Gabo Reforms. After Japan occupied Korea, a Japanese temple on Namsan introduced Joya no Kane. The bell ringing in Bosingak was revived in 1953 in the form of Joya no Kane, but using a pattern of 33 ringings instead of the Japanese 108. The attendance for this annual event is so high that trains on the Seoul Subway do not stop at Jonggak station around that time to prevent accidents.

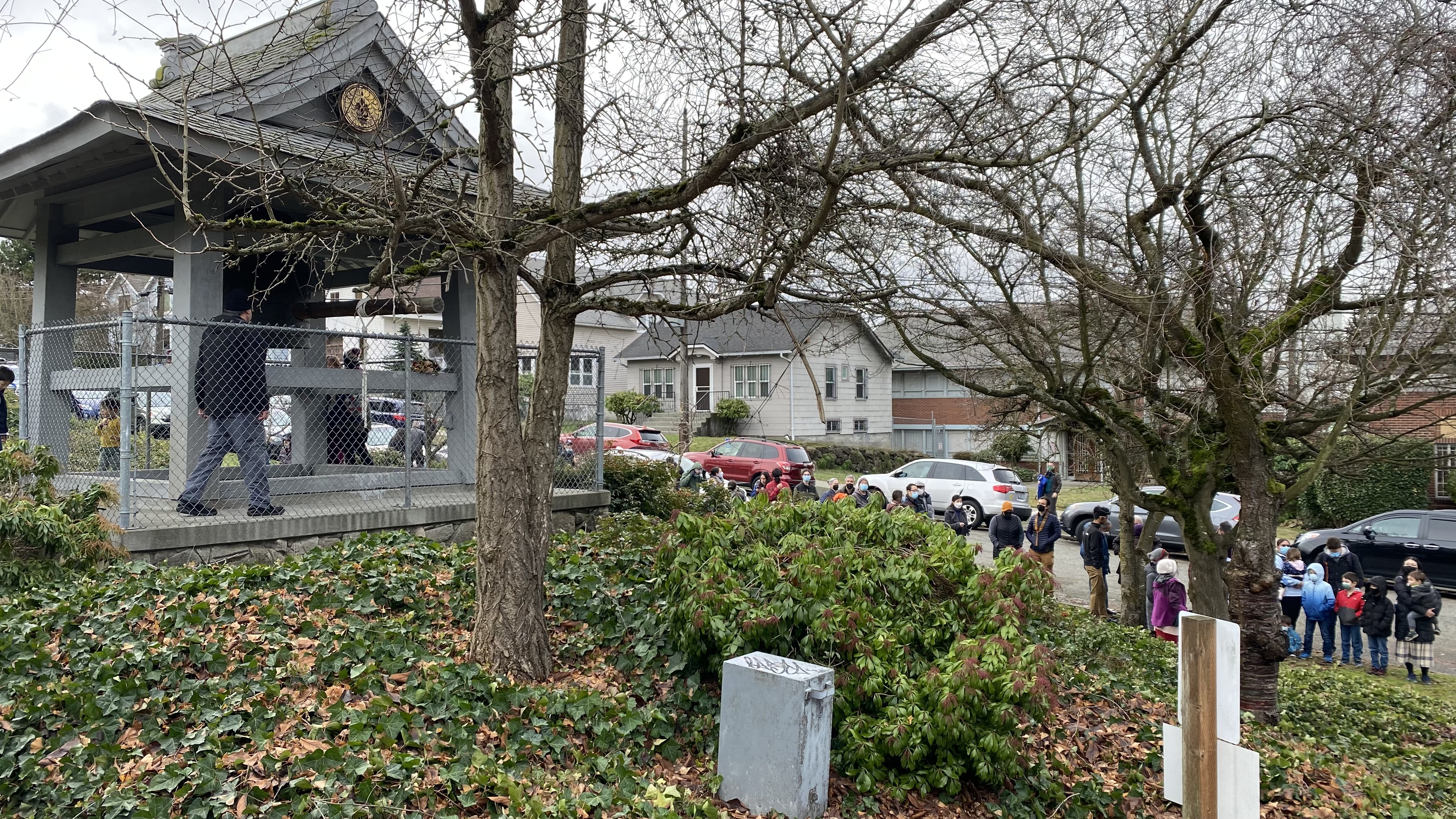
Joya no Kane in Seattle (December 2022)

=== United States ===
Some Japanese Buddhist temples in the United States, such as the Jodo Shinshu Seattle Betsuin Buddhist Temple, also celebrate Joya no Kane. Although, many of these temples ring the bells during the day and/or on a different day to make it easier for members of the sangha to attend.
