= Ordinance of Student Rights =

- Hangul: 학생인권조례
- Hanja: 學生人權條例
- RR: Haksaeng ingwon jorye
- MR: Haksaeng inkwŏn chorye

Student Human Rights Ordinance (Korean: 학생인권조례) is an ordinance in operation in some cities and provinces in South Korea. It first began in Gyeonggi-do Province (2010) and expanded to Gwangju (2011), Seoul (2012), the North Jeolla Province (2013), the South Chungcheong Province (2020, later revoked in 2024), and Jeju Province (2021). In 2019, South Gyeongsang Province proposed a bill as well, but it was finally rejected after being met by strong opposition from Christian groups. The primary objective of the ordinance is to extend human rights protection for students and youth in South Korea.

== Overview ==
The student human rights ordinances mainly include the following, although each province differs slightly in detail:

- Prohibits corporal punishment of students
- Prohibits forced night study sessions (야간자율학습) at school
- Prohibits forced hair length regulations
- Assurance of students' freedom of religion
- Prohibits searching of students' belongings, unless necessary for safety
- Prohibits discrimination of students by gender, religion, nationality, disability, race, and sexual orientation

== Distinctions Between Ordinances ==
The ordinances are very similar, but some are more limited in what they include. The Gyeonggi-do Student Human Rights Ordinance and Seoul Ordinance of Student Rights are the only two to include the right not to be discriminated against on the basis of pregnancy. The most contentious items have been the rights concerning gender and sexual diversity. The Seoul ordinance as well as the Gyeonggi-do ordinance include sexual orientation and gender identity. Gwangju ordinance only includes sexual orientation and Jeollabuk-do only includes gender equality. Seoul, Jeollabuk-do and Gyeonggi-do each dedicate a day to celebrate Student Human Rights Day in efforts to expand interest and participation in the human rights of the student. Gwangju has not created a day devoted to student human rights. The Seoul ordinance mandates that basic human rights must be upheld even if they are not specified in the ordinance.

The ordinances state that each city and province must stay up to date ensuring human rights. The city of Gwangju conducts a survey every two years to keep its human rights plan up to date. In Gyeonggi-do, the Superintendent of Public Instruction conducts an annual survey on student human rights. In Seoul, the Superintendent conducts an annual survey on the actual conditions of student human rights and reflect the results in the drafting of the comprehensive human rights plan for students. In Jeollabuk-do, the Chancellor conducts a survey on the condition of student human rights every year to reflect them in the education of human rights of students.

== See also ==
- ASUNARO: Action for Youth Rights of Korea
- Solidarity for LGBT Human Rights of Korea
- Seoul Ordinance of Student Rights
