= Asunaro =

Asunaro (あすなろ) is Japanese for Thujopsis, a type of evergreen tree. It may refer to:

== Book ==
- Asunaro Hakusho, a manga series by Fumi Saimon.
- Asu-Naro , an organization from the video game Your Turn To Die. (YTTD for short).

== Organization ==
- Asunaro, an imaginary youth organization in the novel Kibō no Kuni no Exodus by Ryū Murakami.
- ASUNARO: Action for Youth Rights of Korea, youth rights organization in South Korea, comes from the aforesaid novel.
- Yokkaichi Asunarou Railway, a third-sector railway in Mie Prefecture, Japan.

== Music ==
- Asunaro, a Japanese J-pop band.
- "Asunaro", a 2008 single by SunSet Swish.
- "Asunaro", a 2011 single by Kenichi Suzumura.
- "Asunaro", a song by Tsunenori from their 2009 album Promising.
