= Self-learning =

Self-learning can refer to:

- Autodidacticism
- Learning theory (education)
- Night self-learning
- Unsupervised learning, a kind of machine learning
