= ASUNARO: Action for Youth Rights of Korea =

South Korean non-profit

- 청소년인권행동 아수나로
- Formation: 2004
- Type: NGO, NPO (De facto)
- Purpose: Youth rights, Student rights
- Headquarters: None
- Location: South Korea
- Members: around 9,000
- Active member: around 60
- Website: www.asunaro.or.kr

- ASUNARO: Action for Youth Rights of Korea
- Hangul: 청소년인권행동 아수나로
- Hanja: 靑少年人權行動 아수나로
- RR: Cheongsonyeon ingwon haengdong Asunaro
- MR: Ch'ŏngsonyŏn inkwŏn haengdong Asunaro

The ASUNARO: Action for Youth Rights of Korea (Korean: 청소년인권행동 아수나로), also known as Asunaro, is a youth rights organization based in South Korea. The Asunaro was established in 2004 a small forum of the name of Asunaro: Research Forum for Youth Rights, the name was changed to ASUNARO: Action for Youth Rights of Korea in February 2006.

As Asunaro aims to build an equal, democratic society, there are no central departments or representatives. Usually many teams work on a national scale for specific needs, but people in the teams does not represent Asunaro workers and anyone can work in the teams. If needed, a few people will be elected and be in charge for the job.

Asunaro has criticized the long study hours South Korean students face in the South Korean education system. The organization provided information for the 2021 Human Rights Watch report on LGBTQ rights in South Korea. In 2022, Asunaro endorsed a statement condemning Russia's invasion of Ukraine.

In December 2024, after President Yoon Suk Yeol's martial law declaration, Asunaro and fellow youth rights organization Jieum launched a grassroots petition, titled “Declaration on the National Crisis”, that called for Yoon's impeachment. More than 52,000 people signed the petition, including 123 advocacy groups.

Every local branches are at the equal terms. Currently, there are 6 local branches, 4 local semi-branches, and several other local communities.

The name Asunaro originated from the imaginary youth organization in the novel Kibō no Kuni no Exodus by Ryū Murakami.

== Book ==
The Asunaro published a book entitled the Meo-Pi-In (ISBN 9788991402317) about youth rights in 2009.

== See also ==
- Ordinance of Student Rights
- Solidarity for LGBT Human Rights of Korea
- Yook Woo-dang
