= Yookwoodang Literary Award =

South Korean literary award

Yookwoodang Literary Award / Yookwoodang Memorial Prize
- Awarded for: -
- Country: South Korea
- Presented by: Solidarity for LGBT Human Rights of Korea
- First award: 2013

- Yookwoodang Literary Award
- Hangul: 육우당문학상
- Hanja: 六友堂文學賞
- Revised Romanization: Yukwudang Munhagsang
- McCune–Reischauer: Yookwoodang Moonhaksang

The Yook Woo Dang Literary Award (Korean:육우당 문학상; Hanja:六友堂文學賞), is a South Korean literature award established as a memorial to Yun Hyon-seok on Dongdaemun in Seoul, April 1, 2013. Yun Hyon-seok was a South Korean gay rights activist and poet who used "Yook Woo Dang" as his pen name.

Yun's dream as a poet and writer was for a renaissance and resurrection of Korean traditional poet and literary creation. After years of experiencing discrimination for his homosexuality, Yun committed suicide in 2003. Ten years after his death, the Solidarity for LGBT Human Rights of Korea established the award in his memory.

The application eligibility is unlimited, and accepts a variety of genres, including poetry, fiction, essays.

== Site link ==
- “이름 없이 죽어간 성소수자 기억해 주세요” 미디어스 2013.04.26. (in Korean)
- “동성애는 사람이 사람 좋아하는 문제… 이상한가요” 서울신문 2013.04.23. (in Korean)
- 한 번도 ‘우리의 이름’으로 장례를 치르지 못했어요
