= Jongno =

Street in Seoul, South Korea

Jongno (Jong-ro)
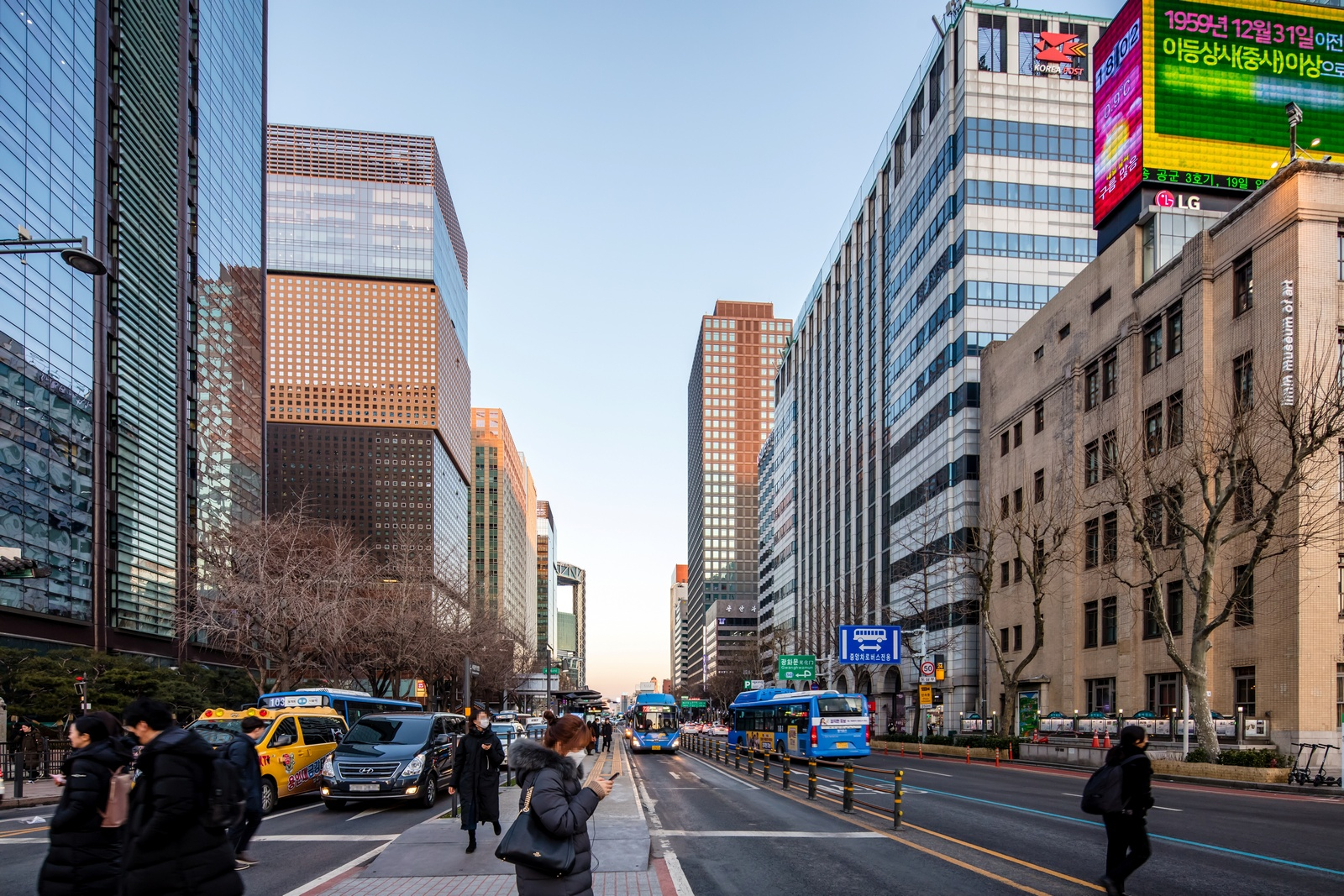
- View of Jong-ro street from Sejong-daero
- Interactive map of Jongno (Jong-ro)
- Part of: National Route 6
- Namesake: Jongno district
- Coordinates: 37.5729°N 126.9794°E

Korean name
- Hangul: 종로
- Hanja: 鐘路
- RR: Jongno
- MR: Chongno

Jongno or Jong-ro (Korean: 종로; lit. 'Bell Street') is a trunk road and one of the oldest major east–west thoroughfares in Seoul, South Korea. Jongno connects Gwanghwamun Plaza to Dongdaemun.

The area surrounding Jongno is a part of Downtown Seoul and one of the most prominent cultural, historical, and financial areas. Many important landmarks are located along its length, including the Bigak pavilion at Sejongno, the Bosingak belfry (hence the street's name), Tapgol Park (Pagoda Park), the Jongmyo royal ancestral shrine, and the Dongdaemun (Great East Gate). Seoul Subway Line 1 passes under Jongno. The western end of Jongno is serviced by Gwanghwamun Station (Seoul Subway Line 5), and Jongno 3-ga Station is serviced by Subway Lines 1, 3, and 5. Because of the multitude of shops, stores, and groceries along the area, the word "Jongno" is often used in the Korean language to express "Town Square."

== Famous places in Jongno ==
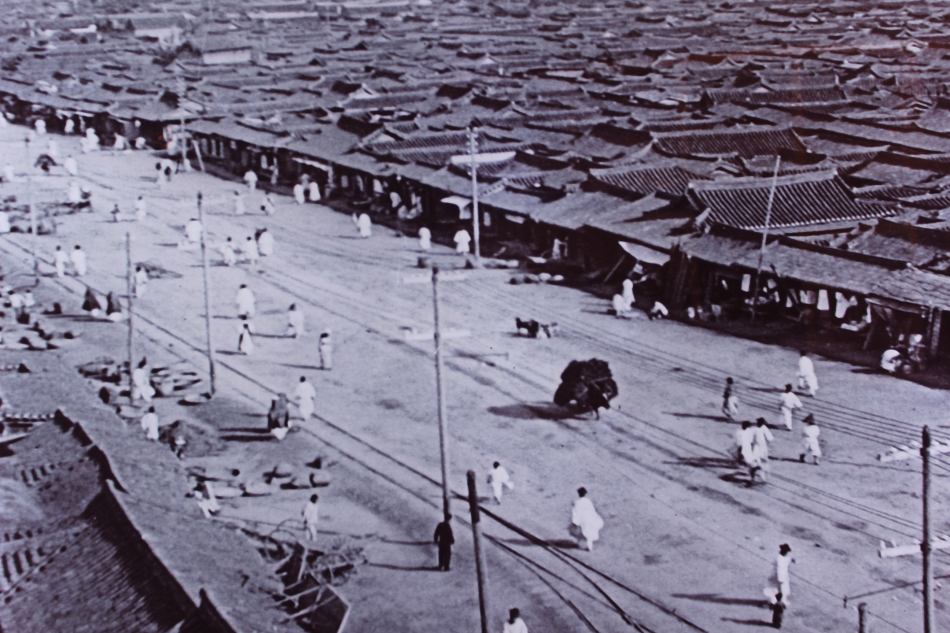
Jongno in 1902

- Many of Korea's largest bookstores including the Kyobo Book Centre (near Sejongno), Youngpoong Bookstore, and Bandi & Luni's Bookstore (Jongno 1-ga) are located near Jongno.
- Jongno Tower is a 33-story office building. Its top floor is equipped with a restaurant and bar which is famous for its view of Jongno and other areas of Seoul. The tower is located near Jonggak Station of Seoul Subway Line 1.
- Insadong-gil, a street famous for its traditional attractions, including galleries, souvenir shops, and restaurants, is accessible directly from Jongno (Jongno 3-ga).
- Cheonggyecheon flows just a block south of Jongno.
- Sejong Center for the Performing Arts, one of the most famous multi-purpose theaters in Korea, lies near the intersection of Jongno and Sejongno.
- The area around Jongno 3-ga Station is the origin of many famous movie theaters; Dansungsa (the oldest in Korea, established in 1907), The Piccadilly Cinema (established in 1958), Seoul Cinema (established in 1978).
- Pimatgol is a well-known alley lying just north of Jongno 1, 2, 3-ga.
- Dongdaemun, which is more properly known as Heunginjimun, is one of the four gates of old Seoul. It is located at the east end of Jongno.
- Dongdaemun Market, one of the best-known wholesale and retail shopping places in Korea, surrounds the area near Jongno 5-ga Station, Dongdaemun Stadium and Dongdaemun History & Culture Park Station.
- LoL Park, an esports and recreational facility in the Gran Seoul office building

== See also ==
- Jongno district
