= Jeong Yol =

South Korean activist (born 1978)

- Hangul: 정민석
- RR: Jeong Minseok
- MR: Chŏng Minsŏk

Pseudonym
- Hangul: 정욜
- RR: Jeong Yol
- MR: Chŏng Yol

Jeong Yol (Korean: 정욜; born October 19, 1978) is a South Korean LGBT rights activist. Since the foundation of Solidarity for LGBT Human Rights of Korea in 1997, he has been an early member of SLRK. From 1998 to 2012, he had been a representative of SLRK. His real name is Jeong Min-suk (정민석).

== Biography ==
=== Early life ===
During college, he acknowledged that he was gay. Later, while serving his mandatory military service, he came out as a homosexual. Then, his commanding officer took him to a mental hospital. After his discharge, he worked as a pastry chef for six years.

=== Activist career ===
In 1997, he joined SLRK. In 2000, he spent more time with SLRK, From 2002 to 2012, he has been a representative of SLRK. In February 2003, the word "homosexual" was deemed a harmful word for youth by South Korean government. So, he struggled against the government with Kwak Yi-kyong, Chang Pyong-kwon and others. In April 2004, banning the word "homosexual" for youth was eliminated in South Korea.

In 2003, he led a movement for the Elimination of Discrimination against LGBT. In 2004, he joined anti-war and peace movements. Since 2006, he has fought for people living with HIV's rights.

== Books ==
- Bravo Gay life [브라보 게이 라이프]. Seoul: Nareum Books [나름 북스], 2011. OCLC 778256613.

== See also ==
- LGBT rights in South Korea
