= City Hall station (Seoul) =

Train station in Seoul, South Korea

시청; City Hall
시청; City Hall
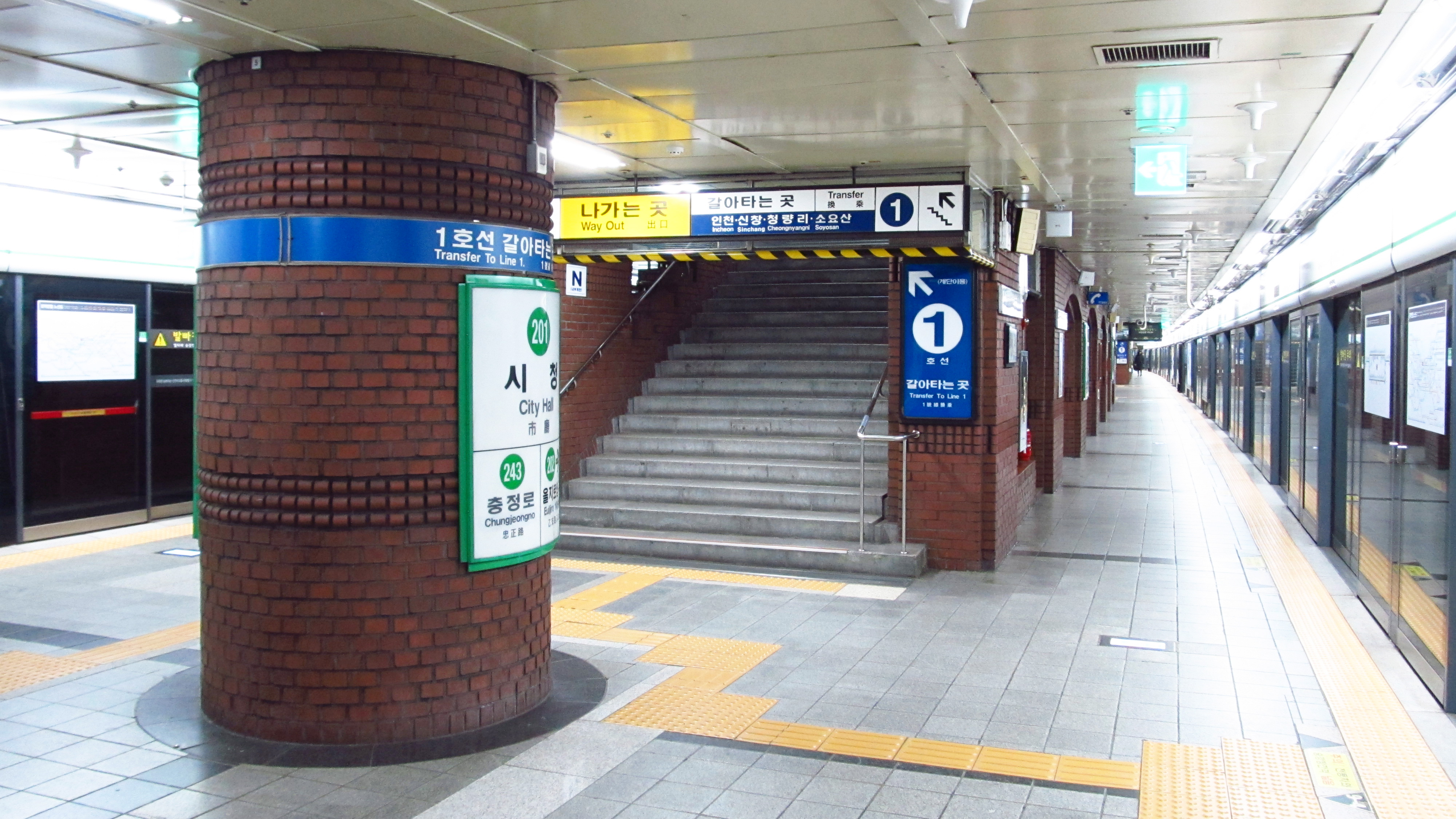
- Station Platform (Line 2)

Korean name
- Hangul: 시청역
- Hanja: 市廳驛
- RR: Sicheong-yeok
- MR: Sich'ŏng-yŏk

General information
- Location: Taepyeongno 1-ga 31, Jung-gu, Seoul
- Coordinates: 37°33′53″N 126°58′37″E
- Operator: Seoul Metro
- Lines: Line 1 Line 2
- Platforms: 3
- Tracks: 4

Construction
- Structure type: Underground

History
- Opened: August 15, 1974; May 22, 1984

Passengers
- (Daily) Based on Jan–Dec of 2012; Line 1: 44,594; Line 2: 51,185
Services
Preceding station	Seoul Metropolitan Subway	Following station
Jonggak towards Kwangwoon University or Yeoncheon	Line 1	Seoul Station towards Incheon, Seodongtan or Sinchang
Jonggak towards Dongducheon	Line 1 Gyeongwon Express	Seoul Station towards Incheon
Jonggak towards Cheongnyangni	Line 1 Gyeongbu Express	Seoul Station towards Sinchang
Chungjeongno Next counterclockwise	Line 2	Euljiro 1(il)-ga Next clockwise
Location

City Hall station is a station on Seoul Subway lines 1 and 2. Despite being regarded as a terminus of Line 2, it is not actually true terminus despite its position as the first station of Line 2. As its name suggests, Seoul City Hall is located right next to the station. Deoksugung, a historic palace of the Joseon dynasty, is on the other side of the boulevard named Taepyeongno.

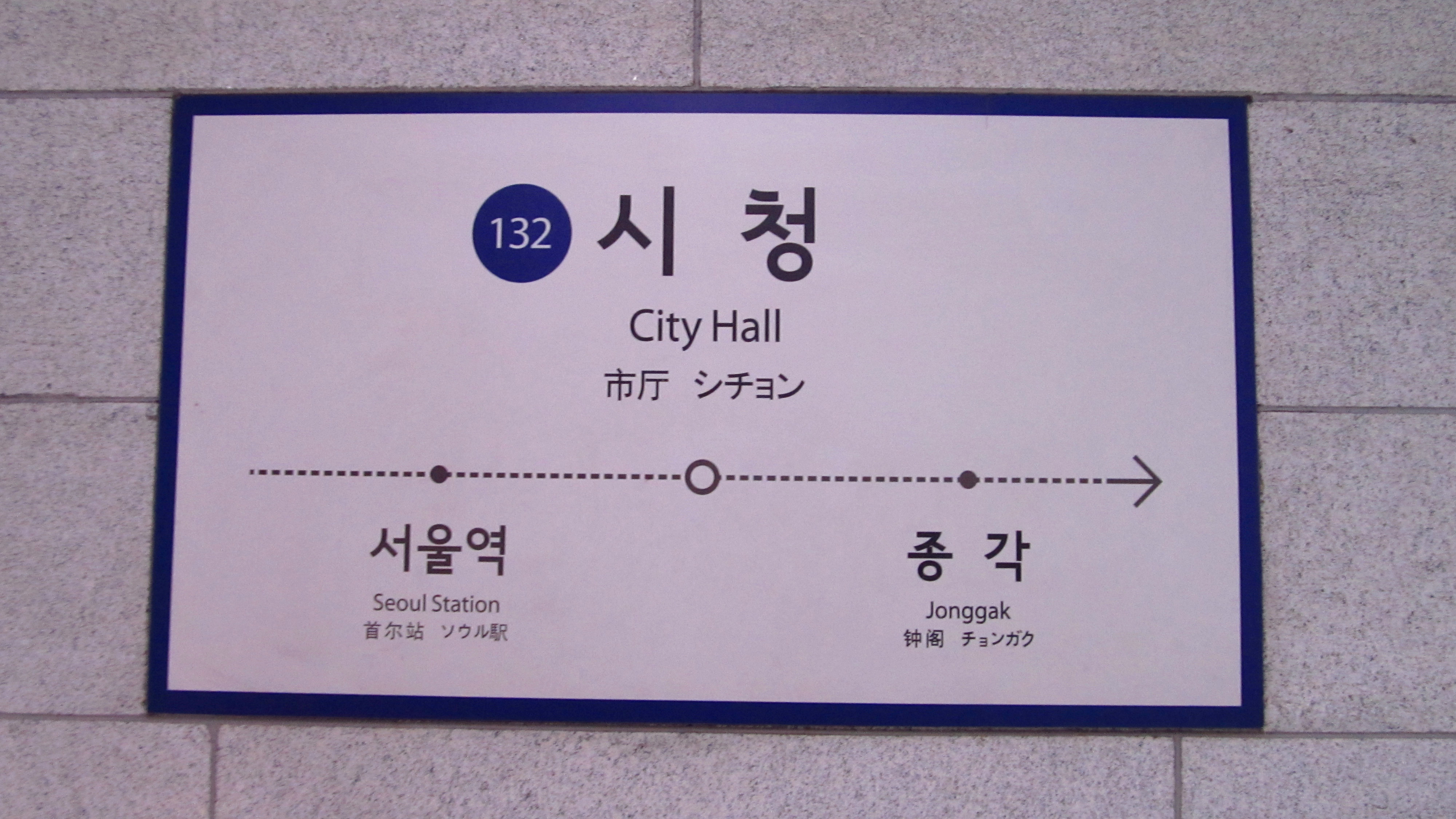
Line 1 station nameplate

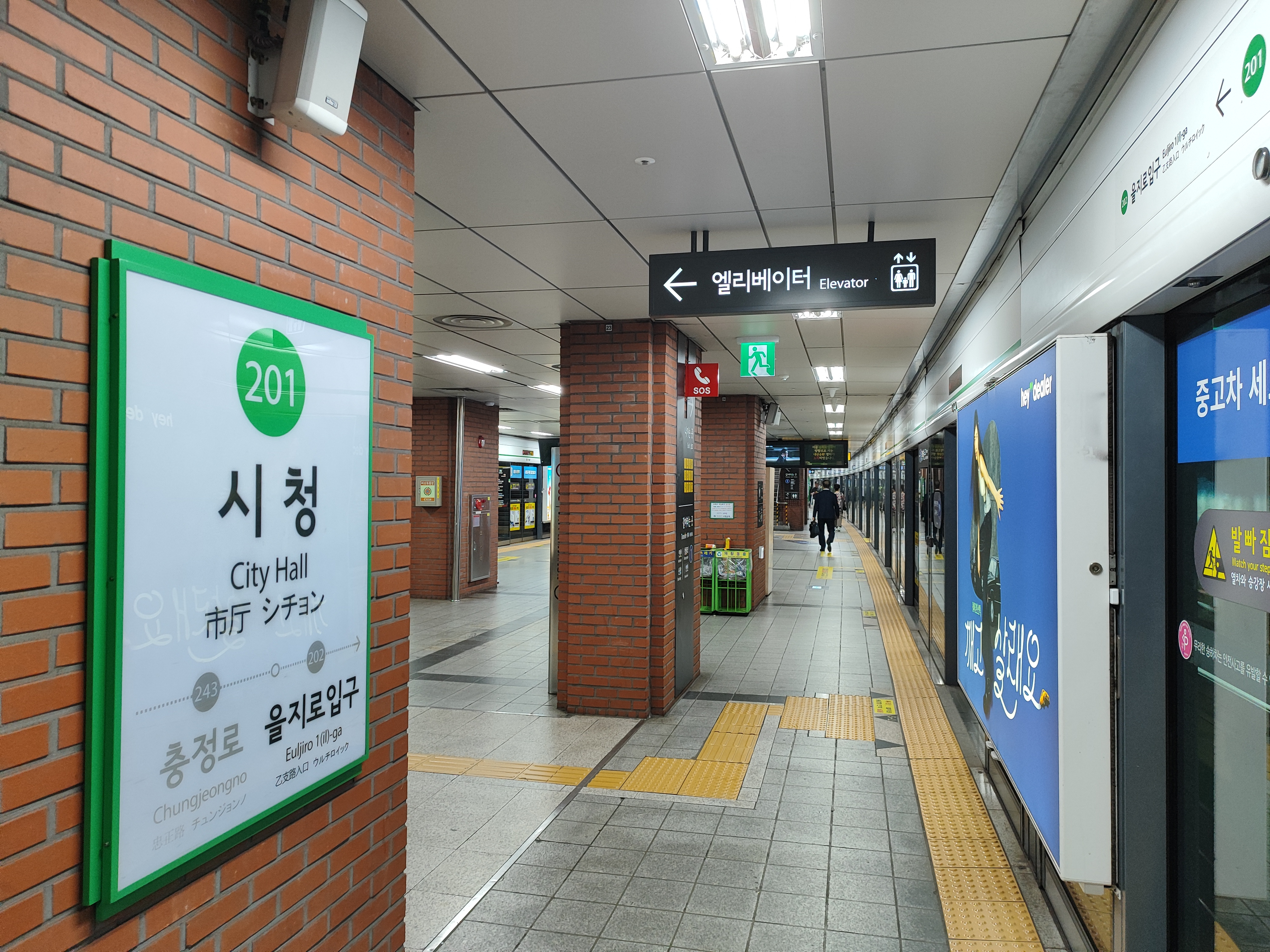
Line 2 station nameplate

== Places ==
Seoul Museum of Art is also nearby. The museum has hosted many special exhibitions, including those of the works of van Gogh, Monet, and René Magritte. The head offices of three daily newspapers, The Chosun Ilbo, The Dong-A Ilbo and Kyunghyang Shinmun, are near the city hall. Seoul Plaza Hotel is located across from the city hall.
