= Jongno Tower =

Skyscraper office building in Seoul, South Korea

- Incidental night view of the Jongno Tower in 2020

General information
- Type: Office building
- Location: 2-6 Jongno, Seoul, South Korea 110-789, Seoul, South Korea
- Coordinates: 37°34′14.84″N 126°59′00.82″E
- Completed: 1999
- Owner: Samsung Securities

Design and construction
- Architect: Rafael Viñoly
- Architecture firm: Rafael Viñoly Architects, Samoo Architects & Engineers

Jongno Tower (Korean: 종로 타워) is a 33-story office building in Jongno, Seoul. Its top floor used to have a restaurant and bar, both of which closed in 2022. It is famous for its view of Jongno and other areas of Seoul. The tower is located near Jonggak Station of Seoul Subway Line 1. The 23rd to 30th floors are hollow. The hangeul lettering is 삼성증권 (Samsung Securities), the owner of the building. It was designed by Rafael Viñoly Architects, and built in 1999. Its height is 132 meters.
