= Yun Hyon-seok =

South Korean writer and activist (1984–2003)

- 윤현석
- Born: August 7, 1984; Incheon, South Korea
- Died: April 26, 2003 (aged 18); Seoul, South Korea
- Cause of death: Suicide by hanging
- Other names: Yook Woo Dang, Seolheon, Midong
- Occupations: Poet, writer, human rights activist

Korean name
- Hangul: 윤현석
- Hanja: 尹賢碩
- RR: Yun Hyeonseok
- MR: Yun Hyŏnsŏk

Art name
- Hangul: 육우당, 설헌, 미동, 동화, 안토니오
- Hanja: 六友堂, 雪軒, 美童, 童花
- RR: Yukudang, Seolheon, Midong, Donghwa, Antonio
- MR: Yugudang, Sŏrhŏn, Midong, Tonghwa, Ant'onio

Yun Hyon-seok (Korean: 윤현석; Hanja: 尹賢碩; August 7, 1984 – April 26, 2003) was a South Korean LGBT poet, writer, and activist. He wrote under the pen names Yuk Wu-dang (육우당, 六友堂, home of six friends) and Seolheon (설헌; 雪軒), and was also known by his nickname Midong (미동; 美童, beautiful boy) or Donghwa (동화; 童花, Boy flower).

Yun spent most of his life being excluded, bullied, and discriminated against for being gay. He used writing as an escape, something he carried with him after he dropped out of high school and moved to Seoul's Dongdaemun District. He became an active member and staff member of Solidarity for LGBT Human Rights of Korea. Yun participated in the LGBT rights movement, as well as movements in support of disability rights and sex worker rights and in opposition of mandatory conscription. A devout Catholic, Yun struggled immensely with the Church's rejection of homosexuality and spent much of his time arguing against misconceptions and cruelty.

Yun died by suicide on April 26, 2003.

== Early life ==
Yun was born in 1984 in Bupyong, Incheon to two teachers, both of whom were devout Roman Catholics. He was baptised with the name "Antonio". Yun began to question his sexuality during middle school and was bullied because of it. He faced homophobia and racism in all parts of his life, including on the internet, and became increasingly isolated, something he documented in his journal. He began self-medicating with tranquilisers, sleeping pills, alcohol, and cigarettes.

Yun was dependent on green tea, rosary beads, tobacco, alcohol, foundation, and sleeping pills, which became known metaphorically as his "six friends." This inspired one of his pen names, Yook Woo-dang, which also means "six friends." It became his most-used pseudonym. Despite facing constant homophobia, including from his family, who attempted to pressure him into being heterosexual, he wrote in October 2002: "I do not think I'm abnormal... This road exists as also another road exists. Most persons use the well-worn path, but I have to go on a lone desolate path."

He attended Seil High School and eventually transferred to Incheon High School, though he dropped out entirely in December 2002. On October 8, 2002, he was sent to a psychiatric hospital, as his family believed theories about homosexuals being psychopaths.

== Later life ==
After leaving school, he moved to Dongdaemun District, Seoul, where he became involved in the literary and LGBT activist scenes. He was deeply upset with political figures' assertions that his work violated traditional Korean social mores due to the conservative attitudes prevalent in South Korean society. Though he wanted to write using his name, he decided to use a pseudonym, as his writing contained homosexual themes. He also used the name Seolheon in honor of the pre-modern Korean poet Heo Nanseolheon.

Yun began writing during his adolescence to work through his pain. He often used satire in his poems and prose and wrote at length about censorship in South Korea, prejudice, disappointment, conservatism, and outdated social norms. Yun joined the D Sijo and W Sijo poetry clubs with the rank of student member. He contributed many writings, including poetry, to the groups over two years.

In January 2003, he worked at a gay bar in Gangnam District, Seoul but left after a brief period due to his anxiety. He worked several part-time jobs and dedicated his free time to activism. In late March, he became a full-time employee of the organisation Solidarity for LGBT Human Rights of Korea after more than two years of volunteer work and participation.

=== Activism ===
He participated in media censorship-opposition movements, particularly those that argued that exposure to homosexuality was harmful to children. He also attended anti-war and pro-peace rallies in the Jongno District, including in opposition to Korean troops being sent overseas to serve in the Iraq War. In April 2003, he became a conscientious objector to military service, refusing to abide by the country's mandatory conscription. His dedication eventually saw him become a leader and speaker in these movements. He was also a participant in disability rights and sex worker rights movements. He was outspoken against the theory that homosexual people were vectors of HIV/AIDS, dismissing it as a groundless assumption. He also worked against homophobia on the internet.

As a Catholic, Yun worked to emphasise that denying acceptance to homosexual Christians, who are "children of God", goes against the Bible's teachings, and that homosexuality is not a mental illness.

On April 2, 2003, the South Korean National Human Rights Commission of Korea made a formal announcement that the country's LGBT and LGBT-related media censorship was a human rights abuse. Some conservative Christians groups demanded that the Commission withdraw the statement. Yun publicly criticized the church's stance in an article in Hangyeorye on April 13, using his real name, before deciding to withdraw from Catholic society entirely. He rescinded this decision within two days and returned to praying daily for the discrimination against homosexual people to end.

=== Death and legacy ===
On April 24, 2003, Yun wrote a six-page suicide note that described the discrimination he had faced, his contempt for homophobic Christians, and the cruelty of homophobia. The letter concluded with: '"I believe My Father God will accept me!" He bequeathed ₩340,000 and his rosary beads to Solidarity for LGBT Human Rights of Korea. He died by suicide by hanging on April 26, 2003 at the Dongdaemun in Seoul. Two bottles of distilled Korean spirits were found near his body. He was discovered by a member of the Solidarity for LGBT Human Rights of Korea the following day.

Following his death, the South Korean government began the process to reverse their decision to censor gay media. To commemorate the third anniversary of Yun's death, a book of his poems and prose was published. The Solidarity for LGBT Human Rights of Korea also established the Yookwoodang Literary Award in his honor.

== Books ==
- Yook Woo Dang: 《Let My Spirit Rain Down as Flower Petals》(육우당: 내 혼은 꽃비 되어; 2013)
- 《Diary of Yook Woo Dang》(육우당일기 六友堂日記, unpublished)

== See also ==
- LGBT rights in South Korea
- LGBT history in South Korea
- Recognition of same-sex unions in South Korea
- Solidarity for LGBT Human Rights of Korea
- Conscription in South Korea
- Jeon Tae-il
- Emily Wilding Davison
- Sylvia Plath

== Sources ==
- Lee Kyong-hwa, 《나》 (바람의 아이들, 2005)
- Han Chae-yun, 《하느님과 만난 동성애》 (차별없는 세상을 위한 기독인연대, 2010)
- Chi Seung-ho, 《후천성 인권 결핍 사회를 아웃팅하다:두려움에서 걸어 나온 동성애자 이야기》 (시대의창, 2011)
- Chung Yeol. Bravo Gay life (Nareumbooks, 2011)
- Korean Homosexual Rights Association, 《작은무지개들의 비밀일기》 (Korean Homosexual Rights Association, 2011)
- [어린이책] 나는 나, 남과 조금 다를 뿐이야 경향신문 2006.04.24
- '인권의 마지노선' 차별금지법은 먼 나라 이야기 경향신문 2013.04.27
- 시립도서관이 거부한 '동성애' 소설
- 기독교인들이여, 당신들의 신을 '죄의 늪'에서 구하라 프레시안 2013.05.09
- 故 육우당 10주기...동성애인권단체 "학생인권조례 성적지향 조항 삭제 우려" 해럴드생생뉴스 2013.04.11
- "동성애는 사람이 사람 좋아하는 문제... 이상한가요"
- 남편 사랑 못 받은 어머니, 동성애자 아들 만든다? 프레시안 2013.04.23
- 10대 성 소수자들 "홍석천처럼 세상에 나가고 싶다" 프레시안 2013.04.24
- 청소년 성소수자들, 거리에서 인권을 외치다 가톨릭뉴스 2012.04.23
