= Kwak Yi-kyong =

South Korean LGBTQ+ rights activist

- Hangul: 곽이경
- RR: Gwak Igyeong
- MR: Kwak Igyŏng

Kwak Yi-kyong (곽이경, born 1979) is a South Korean LGBT human rights activist, civil rights activist, and labor rights activist. From 2012 to the present, she has been a representative of Solidarity for LGBT Human Rights of Korea(SLRK).

In her early years, Kwak was involved with student movements. She was Vicechairman of Goryeo University's Students' Union. In 2002, she joined Solidarity for LGBT Human Rights of Korea (SLRK). From 2004 to 2005 Kwak was Secretary General of SLRK.

In 2005, she was appointed to Education responsible of LGBT minorities Committee (성소수자위원회) of the Democratic Labor Party. She was also involved with the labor rights, human rights, AIDS rights, and Anti-war peace movements. In 2011 Kwak was appointed to the LGBT minorities Committee of the Democratic Labor Party. In 2013, she became adjunct policy director of the National Women's Union (전국여성노조).

In 2012, she was operational chairperson (운영위원장) of SLRK. In 2013, she was chairperson of SLRK.

== See also ==
- Chung Yeol
- LGBT rights in South Korea
