= Seoul Ordinance of Student Rights =

The Seoul Ordinance of Student Rights was initially drafted by the Seoul Metropolitan Office of Education with the support of Seoul's Education Chief, Kwak No-hyun, on September 7, 2011 and was introduced to the Seoul City Council for consideration in October, 2011. The ordinance was officially proclaimed on January 24, 2012. The push for Seoul's ordinance came after both the Gyeonggi Province (2010) and City of Gwangju (2011) enacted their respective ordinances. In addition to political initiatives for the ordinance, there were several groups advocating for its passage, like Common Action for Sexual Minority Students and the Youth Human Rights Group, Asunaro. The objective of the Seoul Ordinance of Student Rights, as it states in its first chapter, is "to ensure that all students' dignity and values as human beings are fulfilled and that they can live a free and happy life." The ordinance provides a variety of provisions and protections to students attending kindergartens, elementary schools, and high schools in Seoul. The ordinance protects student’s freedom of conscience and religion as well as their freedom of expression, which includes demonstrations and forms of protest on school grounds. The ordinance also offers protective guidelines against discrimination on the basis of gender identity and sexual orientation, physical violence (corporal punishment), compulsory studying after school hours, among many other protective clauses. Seoul's Ordinance of Student Rights in not legally binding, but works more as an educational charter for school administrators in Seoul. The ordinance also stipulates rules around a governing Student Human Right Committee that oversees the implementation of the ordinance in schools, as well as handle issues or violations that may surface as the ordinance is in place. The ordinance also includes guidelines for a Student Participation Committee, which is meant to represent Seoul's student population in relation to the Student Human Rights committee.

== Controversy and Backlash ==
Despite the overwhelming public and political support for the passage of the Seoul Ordinance of Student Rights, there were several instances of community and political pushback. Groups like the Korean Federation of Teachers’ Association (KFTA) adamantly opposed the adoption of the ordinance, citing a poll in which 76% of teachers in Seoul disagreed with the ordinance . The KFTA has also stated that the rights of children in kindergarten in accordance with Seoul's ordinance, are a show of "‘human rights populism’ and that [Seoul's ordinance] neglects duty and responsibility in the name of protecting human rights.” Other groups like The Association of Mothers Concerned about Education and The Ministry of Education, Science and Technology (MEST) also voiced their opposition of the ordinance.

== 2017 Amendment ==
In September, 2017, the Seoul Metropolitan Council amended the Seoul Ordinance of Student Rights to expand on provisions against hate speech. This move was made amidst mounting worries of verbal abuse in Seoul's schools.

== Corporal Punishment ==
Prior to the enactment of the Seoul Ordinance of Student Rights there was a specific ban on all forms of corporal punishment enacted by the Seoul Metropolitan Office of Education in July 2010. It was spearheaded by the head of the office, Kwak No-hyun. Chapter 2 Section 2 Articles 6 (Right to be Free from Violence) and 7 (Right to Safety from Danger) are the direct sections which refer to corporal punishment and violence within the ordinance. Article 6 explicitly bans all physical and verbal abuse including; corporal punishment, bullying, sexual violence. Students are to be free from intentional disclosure of information that may lead to harassment due to prejudices of a particular group or social minority. The head of schools must make sure to prevent all physical and verbal abuse as described above. Article 7 states school leaders should maintain a safety management system to ensure student safety. If any accidents are to occur at school, school leaders are to help rescue the victims quickly and cooperate with relevant authorities and local residents to prevent damages. There has been a ban in place prior to the enactment of the Ordinance, but both are hard to enforce, so even though corporal punishment is seen as detrimental to the mental health and learning environment of students there is little to currently stop it from continuing.

=== Backlash ===
People who are opposed to the ordnance fear that the banning of corporal punishment will lead to teachers diminished ability to control their classrooms and to punish violent students. Some who are opposed believe that the protections put forth by the ordinance are redundant because there are already laws against discrimination and corporal punishment. Corporal punishment continues, despite the ban and ordinance, in private schools because they often have a set of rules that attending students agree to and the schools often get permission from parents.

=== LGBT Protections ===
The Seoul Student Human Rights Ordinance is the first student rights ordinance in South Korea to include protection on the basis of gender identity. The inclusion of protections on the basis of gender identity and sexual orientation in the Ordinance were highly controversial, with conservative organizations arguing that these protections promote homosexuality and progressive organizations claiming the protections protect LGBT students. In 2011, many student and nonprofit organizations mobilized to pass a Seoul Student Human Rights Ordinance that included protections on the basis of sexual minority status and gender identity. In early 2011, groups like the Korean gay men's organization Chingusai began collecting signatures in favor of the Ordinance from the public and performing signing ceremonies. Major signing campaigns were hosted at Children’s Grand Park on March 6, 2011 and in Seoul Plaza on May 6–7, 2011.

The efforts of such events culminated in the acquisition of over 90,000 signatures from Seoul citizens approving the Ordinance and its protections for LGBT students.[23]

As the ordinance received increasing public support, the protections for LGBT students were targeted by conservative groups. In order to ensure the inclusion of LGBT protections in the ordinance, multiple LGBT organizations including Chingusai and Solidarity for LGBT Rights of Korea collaborated to hold three emergency meetings on September 14, September 22 and October 4, 2011.

Together, LGBT groups organized social media initiatives, spoke at public events such as the 2011 National Workers Convention, and orchestrated protests.[25]

=== Implementation of the Ordinance ===
Many cases where the ordinance has been implemented have been observed within the education system. In Seoul, a middle school ethics teacher was investigated by the Office of Education due to her hateful comments addressed toward homosexual individuals. The students reported their teacher to an online portal for petitions called Sinmungo. The informants claimed the teacher said, “homosexuality is an abominable and filthy crime. Homosexuals should be gathered in one place and burned.” Under the Ordinance for Students’ Rights, no minorities could be discriminated against. Homosexual individuals also fell into the minority category and the teacher was investigated.

Another case where the Ordinance of Students’ Rights was implemented was in 2016, when an instructor at a private university in Seoul was fired for hate speech. The instructor was hired to teach liberal arts but instead she used her platform to promote a hateful attitude towards homosexuality. During class she referred to homosexuality as a disease and claimed that all homosexual individuals were infected with HIV/AIDS. She pushed her students to complete assignments that forced them to agree with her views, which eventually led to students organizing and protesting to get her fired. She was then fired from her position. The university made it a requirement following that incident for teachers to refrain from engaging in hate speech.

=== Progress for Minority Students in Higher Education ===
The Ordinance of Students’ Rights served as a gateway to the Seoul National University Human Rights Guidelines. The importance of having students’ voices be heard is found in the creation of anti-discriminatory legislature such as this. On September 7, 2016 the Seoul National University Human Rights Guidelines were added upon during a meeting which unanimously voted to pass the law that prevents people from discriminating against sexual minorities. This faced a lot of backlash from religious organizations such as the Seoul National University Christian Faculty Association and the Christian Alumni Association. Regardless of the backlash, sexual minorities would be protected under the new guidelines that were passed.

There has also been in increase in the election of students who have came out as being homosexual to serve as council members on the university councils. One example of a homosexual individual who has been elected to serve on a university council is Bo-mi—who was elected to be president of the Seoul National University student council.

== See also ==
- Ordinance of Student Rights
- SOGILAW Annual Review
