= Jonggak station =

Train station in South Korea

Coordinates: 37°34′13″N 126°58′59″E

종각; Jonggak
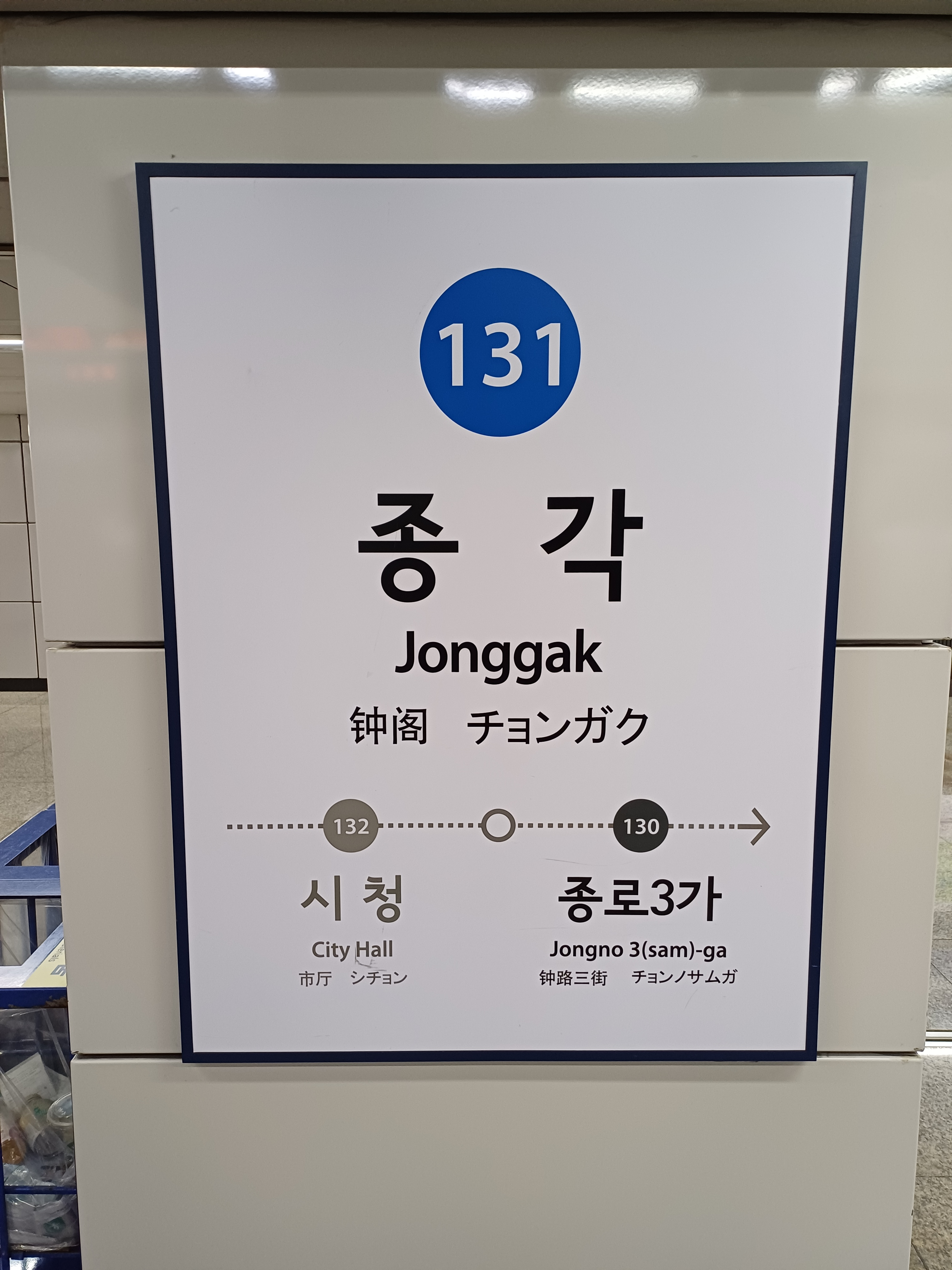
- Station nameplate

Korean name
- Hangul: 종각역
- Hanja: 鐘閣驛
- RR: Jonggak-yeok
- MR: Chonggak-yŏk

General information
- Location: 20-3 Jongno 1-ga, 55 Jongno Jiha, Jongno-gu, Seoul
- Operator: Seoul Metro
- Line: Line 1
- Platforms: 2
- Tracks: 2

Construction
- Structure type: Underground

History
- Opened: August 15, 1974

Passengers
- (Daily) Based on Jan-Dec of 2012. Line 1: 92,954
Services
Preceding station	Seoul Metropolitan Subway	Following station
Jongno 3(sam)-ga towards Kwangwoon University or Yeoncheon	Line 1	City Hall towards Incheon, Seodongtan or Sinchang
Jongno 3(sam)-ga towards Dongducheon	Line 1 Gyeongwon Express	City Hall towards Incheon
Jongno 3(sam)-ga towards Cheongnyangni	Line 1 Gyeongbu Express	City Hall towards Sinchang
Location

Jonggak Station is a station on the Line 1 of the Seoul Subway in South Korea. It is located on Jongno, central Seoul and comprises a large underground arcade.

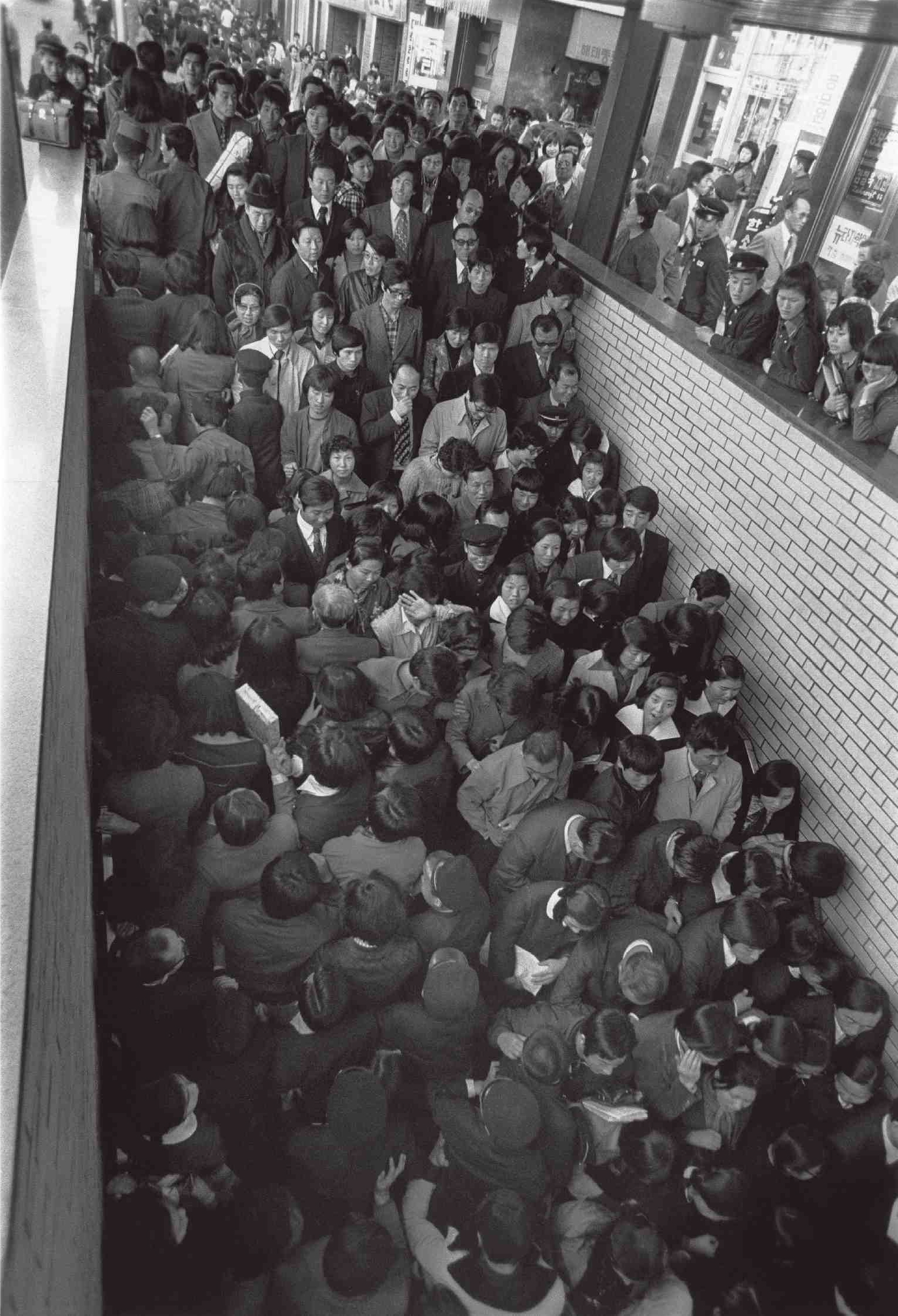
Jonggak station in 1977

The second-largest book shop in South Korea, the Bandi & Luni's lying under the Jongno Tower, which in turn is just above this station, is directly accessible from the station.

On every New Year's Day, the bell ceremony (Jeyaeui Jong Tajongsik) is held at Boshingak, the nearby bell pavilion. (The name of the station comes from this pavilion, jong meaning bell and gak pavilion.) At those times the area is so crowded with tens of thousands of Seoulites that trains do not stop at Jonggak as to avoid any accidents.

== Station layout ==
G	Street level	Exit

L1; Concourse	Lobby	Customer Service, Shops, Vending machines, ATMs

L2; Line 1 platforms	Side platform, doors will open on the left
L2; Line 1 platforms	Southbound	Line 1 toward Incheon, Seodongtan or Sinchang (City Hall) →
L2; Line 1 platforms	Northbound	← Line 1 toward Kwangwoon University or Yeoncheon (Jongno 3(sam)-ga)
L2; Line 1 platforms	Side platform, doors will open on the left

== Surroundings ==
The following places are accessible from this station's exits as listed.

- Exit 1: Gwanghwamun; National Tax Office; U.S.A. Embassy; Seoul Fire and Accident Prevention Headquarters; Jongno Gu Office; Jongno Fire Station; Gwanghwamun Station (Line 5)
- Exit 2: Gongpyeon Dong; Anguk Dong; Jogyesa
- Exit 3: Insa Dong; Seoul YMCA
- Exit 4: Gwancheol Dong; Boshingak; Korea Development Bank
- Exit 5: Mugyo Dong; Gwanggyo; Insurance Agency; Korea Tourism Organization
- Exit 6: Seorim Dong; Gwanghwamun Post Office
