= Bosingak =

Bell pavilion in Seoul, South Korea

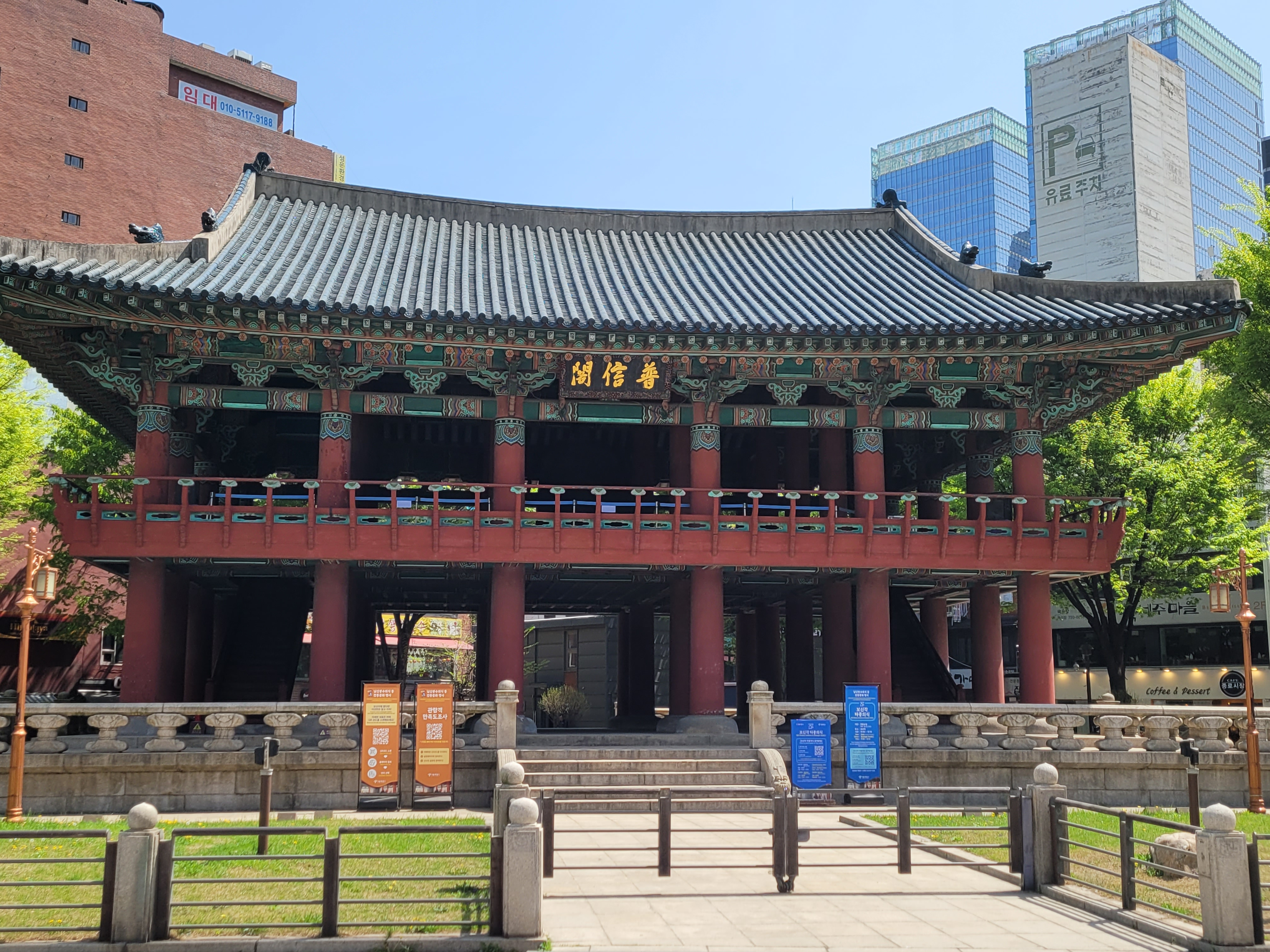
- The building in 2024
- Interactive map of the Bosingak area

General information
- Location: 03189 54, Jong-ro, Jongno-gu, Seoul
- Coordinates: 37.5699°N 126.9834°E
- Completed: 1396

Other information
- Public transit: 63m from Exit 4 of Jonggak Station on Line 1 (1-minute walk)

Korean name
- Hangul: 보신각
- Hanja: 普信閣
- RR: Bosingak
- MR: Posin'gak

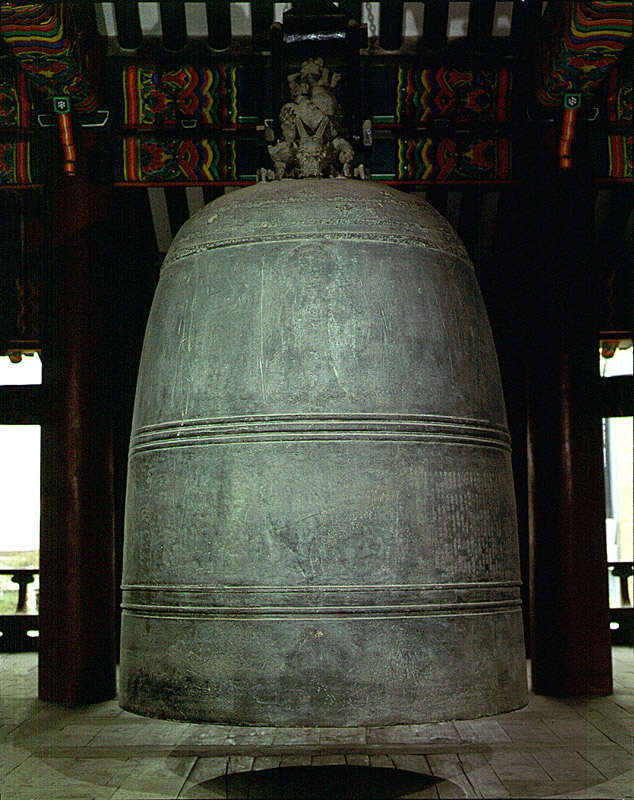
The Bosingak bell (Treasure No 2. ROK)

Bosingak (Korean: 보신각) is a large bell pavilion on Jongno in Seoul, South Korea. The bell in Bosingak gives Jongno its name, which translates to "bell street". The pavilion was originally constructed in 1395 but destroyed many times by both war and fire. It was designated Bosingak by Emperor Gojong in 1895. The bell was cast in 1468.

In the Joseon period, this bell was at the center of the castle town. The bell was struck to announce the opening and closing of the four gates around Seoul. At 4 am and 10 pm the bell was struck 33 times and gates were opened and closed. It was used as a fire alarm as well. In modern times, the bell is rung only at midnight on New Year's Eve. Because of the massive number of people who attend this ceremony, Metro trains on Line 1 of the Seoul Subway do not stop at Jonggak Station on New Year's Eve.

== History ==
It was in 1398 (the 7th year of King Taejo's reign) that the bell was first hung in Hanyang during the Joseon Dynasty, and a bell that was cast in Gwangju was hung on the west side of Cheongungyo's bell tower.

Bosingak served as an important landmark and a means of keeping time for the city. The bell tower, Bosingak, was once part of the city's defensive system. It stood at the center of a busy marketplace and was used to announce the opening and closing of the city gates during the Joseon Dynasty. Every evening, the bell would toll to signal the closing of the gates, after which the city would be under curfew. Bosingak originally served as a pivotal landmark in the city, playing a significant role in timekeeping for Seoul.

The Bosingak Bell, originally housed at Jongno Pavilion in 1395, tolling morning and evening hours, was destroyed by fire in 1597 during Japanese invasions. After reconstruction, a bell from Wongaksa Temple replaced it. Its origins are uncertain due to a lack of inscriptions. Records suggest it was at Sindeok wanghu's tomb before moving to Wongaksa, and later King Seonjo relocated it to Bosingak. Confusion arises with another bell called Heungcheonsa Temple Bell, now at Deoksugung Palace, due to similar timelines and temple associations. Designated Treasure No. 2 since 1948, the deteriorated Bosingak Bell is displayed at the National Museum of Korea, while a replica hangs in the pavilion. Today, the Bosingak Bell is a symbol of Seoul and holds cultural significance.

== Gallery ==
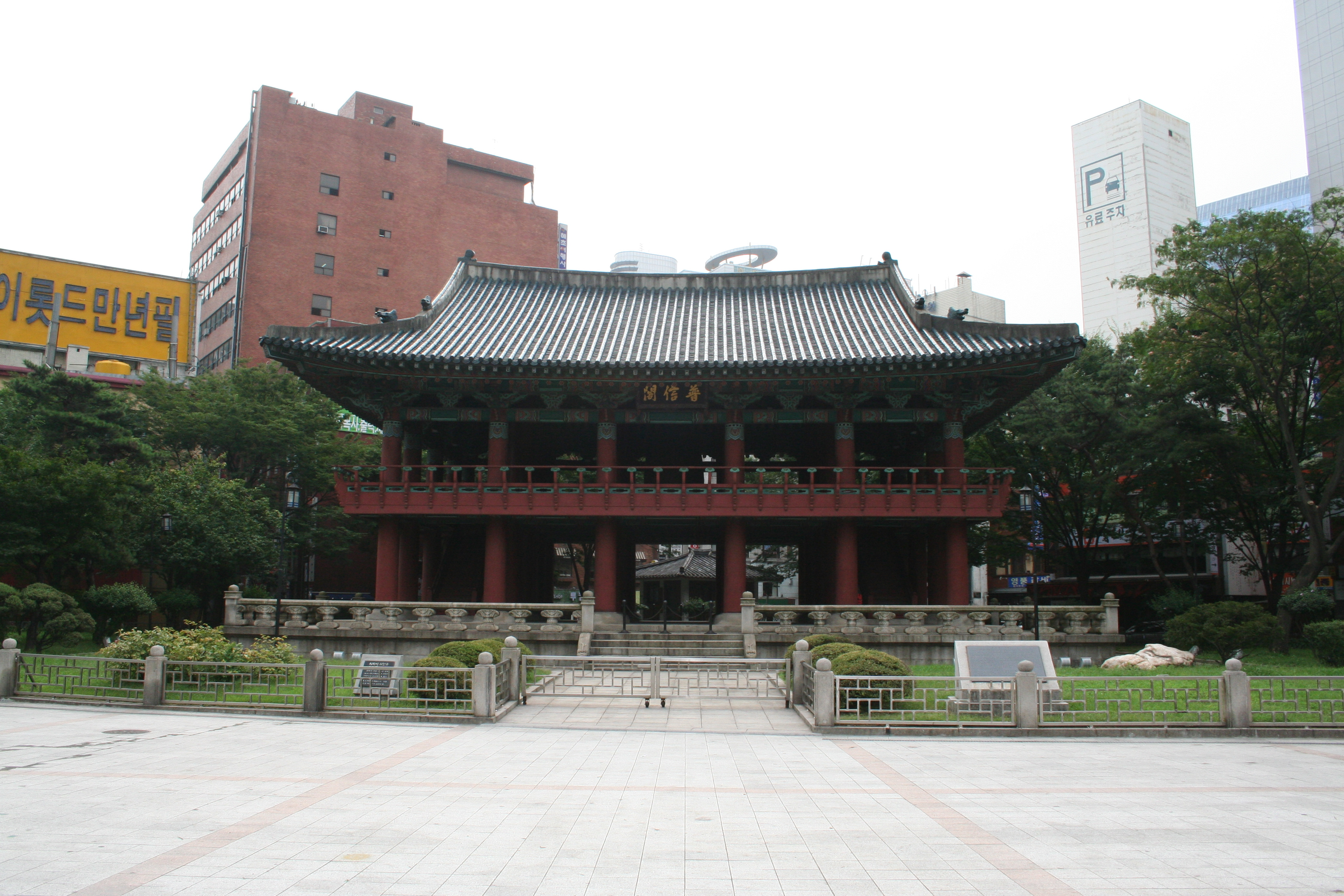

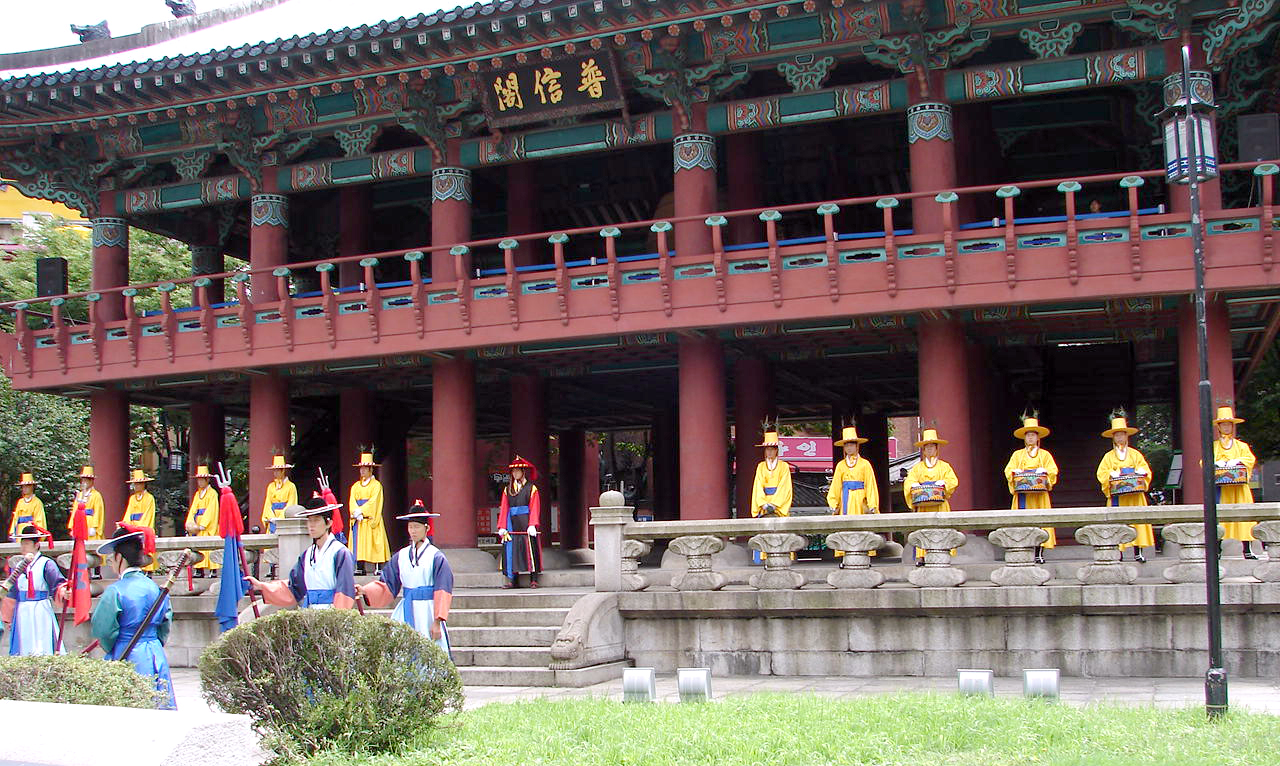

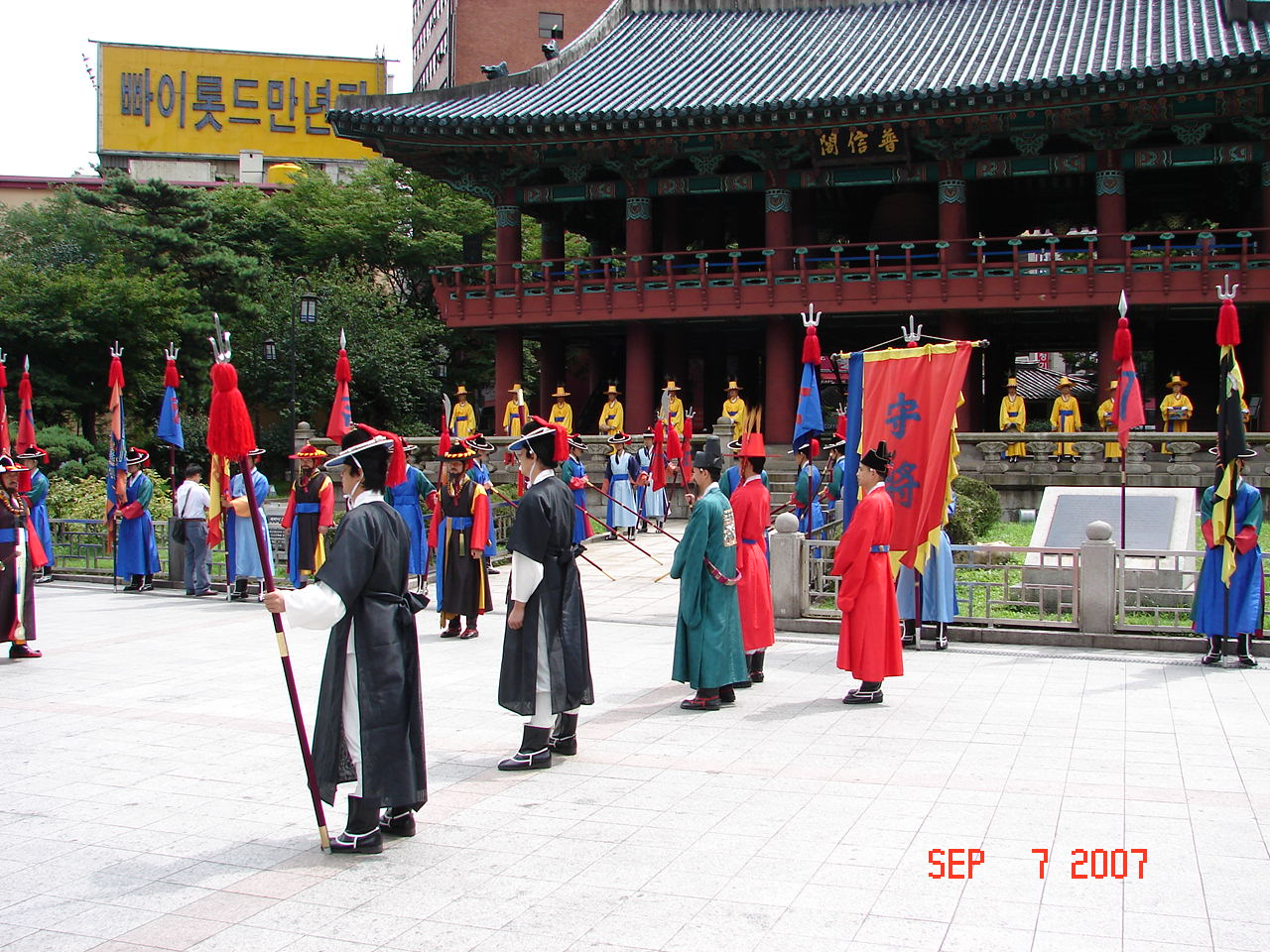

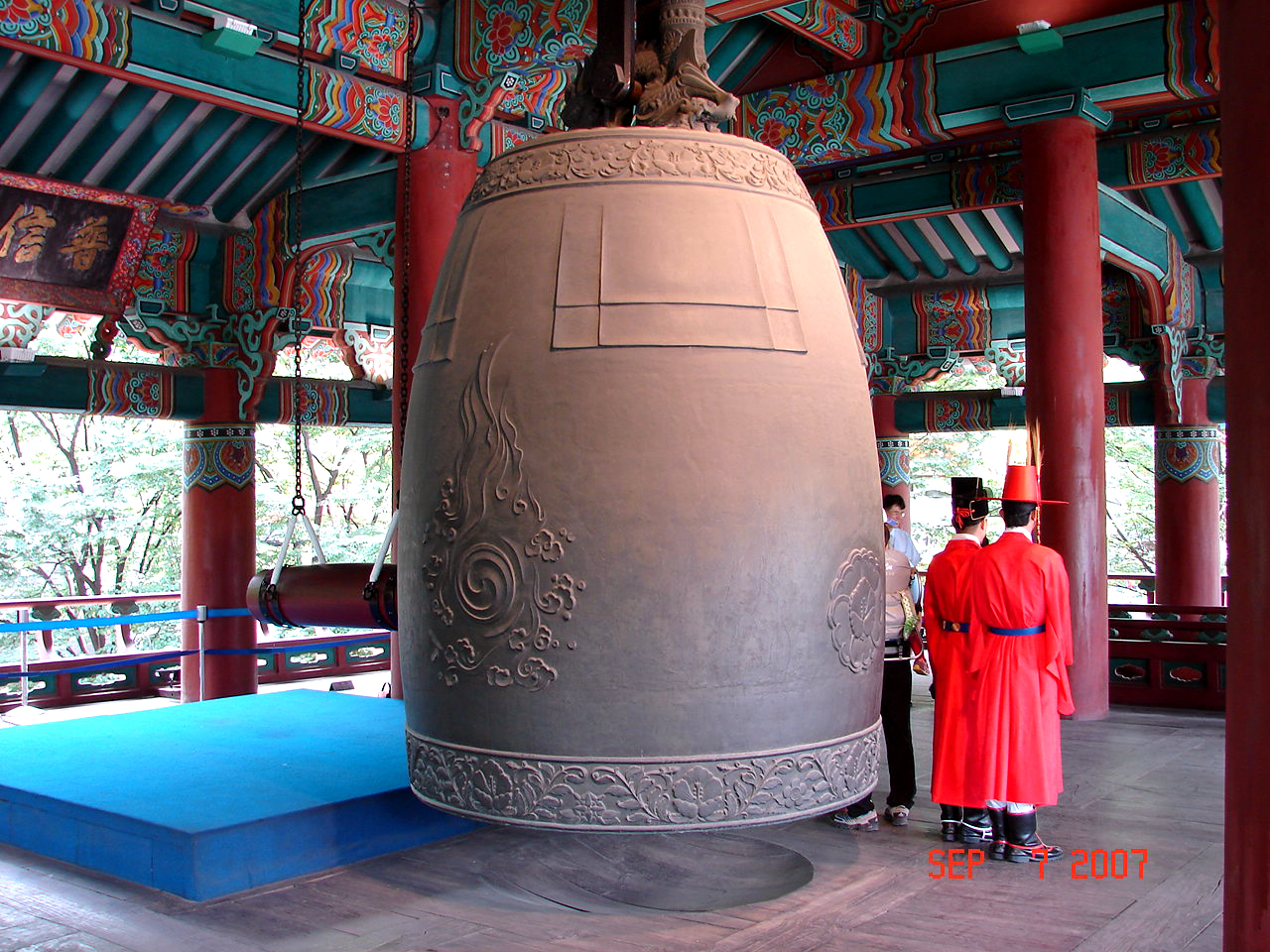
