= Night self-learning =

Educational programs for adults

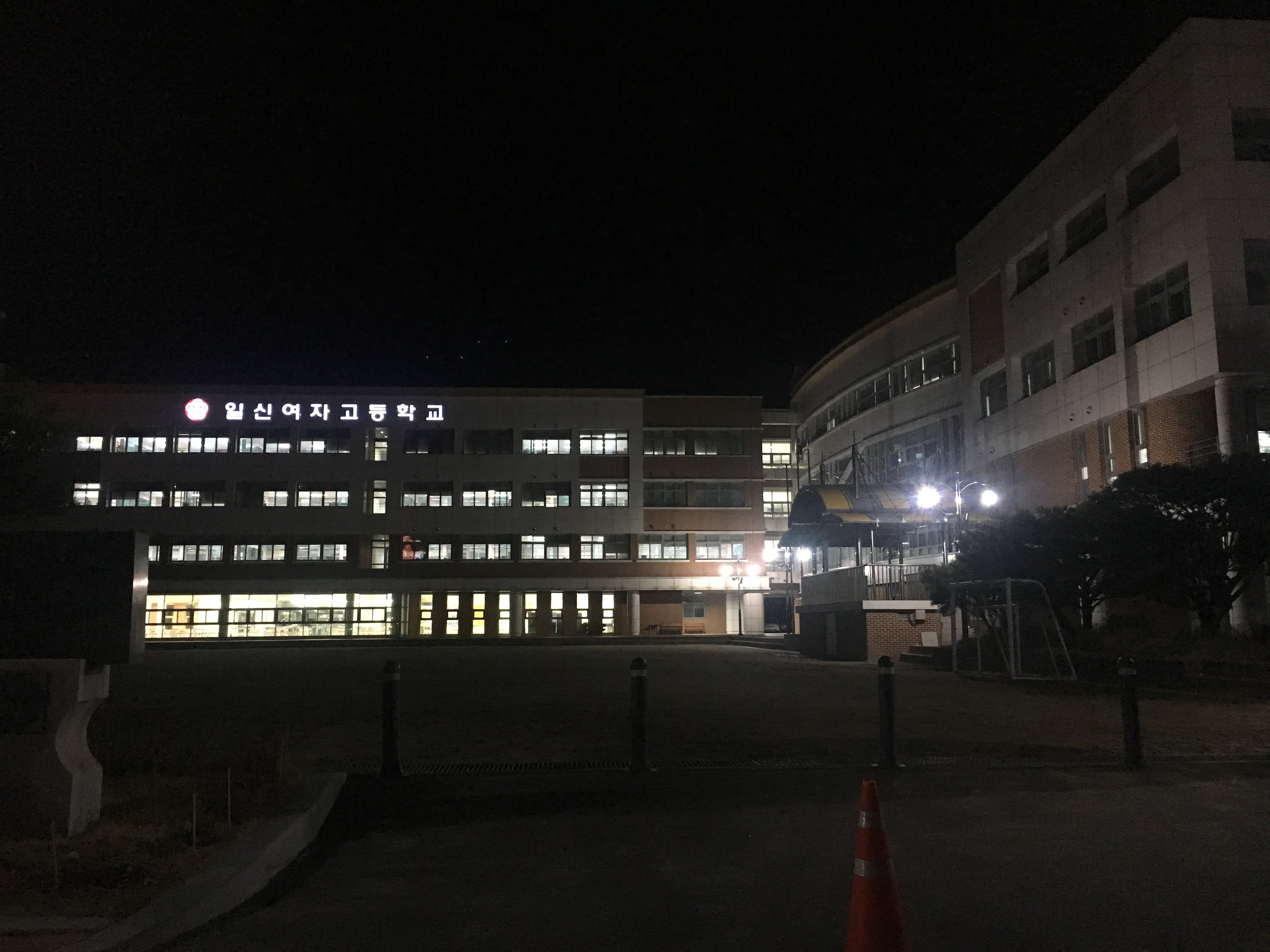
Picture about high school students in South Korea studying until late night

Night self-learning (Korean: 야간자율학습(夜間自律學習); simplified Chinese: 晚自习; traditional Chinese: 晚自習) is a self-administered program available to students from some middle schools and most high schools in mainland China, Taiwan, South Korea and Germany. This includes the zero hour class before the regular class (also called "morning self-learning" (simplified Chinese: 早自习; traditional Chinese: 早自習)) and the night self-learning after the regular class. Since it is a self-learning program, it does not offer educational programs like supplementary classes or after-school programs.

== Concept ==
Usually, the concept of "self-learning" is not to unilaterally accept learning in the course of the teacher's control according to the teacher's advance plans, as is the case with traditional teaching activities, but instead the learner feels the need to learn on their own and studies subjects they do poorly in after self-planning. It is used in the same term as "Independent learning" as it is opposed to "Other-directed learning". Also, it is based on spontaneity, creativity and autonomy.

However, it is different conceptually in South Korea. Night self-learning is a strictly passive learning process, and it is enforced under the supervision of a teacher in South Korea. In South Korea, night self-learning for high school students begins at around 6 pm. on average when classes are completed and night self-learning is finished until 9 pm, 10 pm. Depending on the school, students who want to study at night after regular night self-hours will be able to study for an additional hour. The average Korean high school students spend 10 hours 47 minutes studying, and it is believed that the impact of ‘the zero class’ and ‘night self-learning’ is significant.

Ministry of Education(South Korea)

Because of the policy of ‘The Ministry of Education and Human Resources Development (MOHRD)’, the compulsory night self-study was prohibited, but the standardized self-learning continued. Some people argue that self-learning from early morning till late night is detrimental to the health of students and do not help them learn efficiently in the long run. In China, similar to the above education system, self-learning is also being conducted. The government's basic policy is to leave school at 4 p.m., but generally, middle and high school students stay at school from 8 pm to 9 pm. Accordingly, there was an opposite signature on the Internet.

== Background and Development ==
=== Background ===
The night self-learning started in 1980 with the July 30 educational reform measures. The focus of the education reform was the normalization of school education and the elimination of excessive private tutoring. In particular, the college entrance exam and overheating private tutoring were emerging as educational issues and general problems of society at that time. At the time, the education authoritiessaid that over-heating private tutoring not only greatly hampered the normalization of school education, but also created a sense of crisis among the classes. As the private tutoring and supplementary classes were abolished after the educational reform measures, the school judged that the preparation for the college entrance exam was insufficient only with regular classes. It was an origin of the night self-learning. At that time, the education authorities continuously prohibited night self-learning from being directed against the normalization of education measures, but schools in the front line continued to violate the ban, making night free learning secretly. In the past, this had been repeated over and over again. However, as more and more schools implemented night self- learning, the educational authorities admitted that in principle, night self-learning should be done through the free participation of the students.

=== Development ===
Since the introduction of high school standardization, high schools in most parts of the country have tried to nurture prestigious schools. The school increased the night self-study to get more students into top universities. However, there are persistent opinions about the abolition of night self-learning. Because they have thought the compulsory night self-learning system ignored the human rights of students and the educational effects were also doubtful. Accordingly, the Ministry of Education banned the uniform supplementary learning at high schools and the night self-learning after 10 p.m.

== Present ==
In present, 1,900 out of 2,258 schools across the Korea are found to be implementing night self-learning. Although there are many schools that make students do night self-learning voluntarily, there are still high schools that force their students to do it compulsorily. However, night self-learning is gradually being abolished in the Greater Seoul area.

== Effect ==
=== Negative effects ===
Under the current system, high schools that have abolished night self-learning accept students to study in classrooms through application. However, students who have no place to study at night eventually study at school. Instead of reading in rooms and private educational institutes, students choose school because of the high financial burden. Some students are having dinner at convenience stores because there is no dinner offered when the night self-learning was conducted. Schools and local governments should make sure that students who participate in night self-study receive a good dinner at school. These are the minimum considerations that an educator can give to students who want to study. It is not the only problem. Private education costs are rising as more student flock to nearby private educational institutes. Furthermore, if all students had similar quality education and private education cost was reduced due to night self-learning, the private education portion increased by the night self-learning abolition, changing the quality of education for each student. For example, innovation schools in Busan have strengthened public education by freely implementing night free learning. Due to that, the number of under-grade students has declined.

=== Positive effects ===
Unconditioned night self-learning and passion about studying involves students who try to get into college. Therefore, an academic atmosphere is created in classrooms that enforce night self-learning. Or, students who want to do physical education or other self-improvement can study or attend private educational institutes. Ultimately, it is meaningful that the great cause of human rights for students has been fulfilled. The majority of people now support the abolition of night self-learning. Unlike regular classes, where all students have to be guided manually, night self-learning is a time when students can self-led their studies. However, there are many people who oppose it. The main reason for this is rising private education costs, followed by a rise in juvenile delinquency and a decrease in learning time. Therefore, a policy to reduce private education expenses is necessary to increase the effectiveness of the abolition of night self-learning. In addition, various programs within the school should be developed and operated considering students' career path or aptitude.

== See also ==
- Education in South Korea
- Self-learning (Korean: 자율학습)
- Hell Joseon
- Hagwon (Korean: 학원)
