= Dongdaemun =

Old east gate of Seoul, South Korea

Coordinates: 37°34′16.15″N 127°0′34.70″E

Heunginjimun
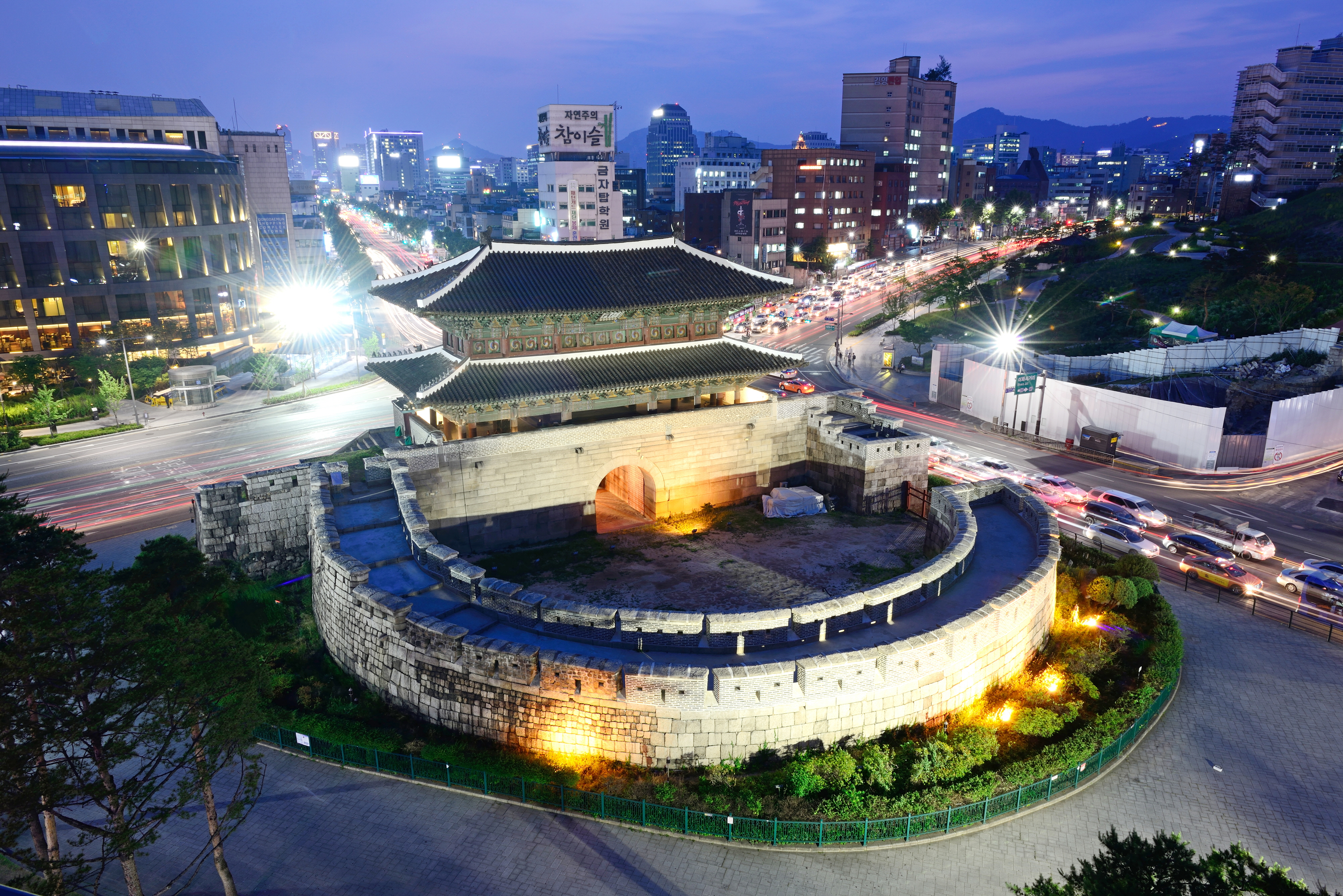
- Interactive map of the Heunginjimun area
- Alternative names: Dongdaemun

General information
- Type: Fortress gate
- Location: Jongno 288, Jongno District,, Seoul, South Korea
- Construction started: 1396
- Renovated: 1453; 1869
- Owner: Government of South Korea
- Operator: Jongno-gu Office

Other information
- Public transit: Dongdaemun station(Line 1)

Korean name
- Hangul: 동대문; 흥인지문
- Hanja: 東大門, 興仁之門
- RR: Dongdaemun; Heunginjimun
- MR: Tongdaemun; Hŭnginjimun

Heunginjimun (Korean: 흥인지문; lit. 'Gate of Rising Benevolence'), a.k.a. Dongdaemun (동대문; lit. 'Eastern Great Gate'), is one of The Eight Gates of Seoul in the Seoul City Wall, a prominent landmark in central Seoul, South Korea. The Korean name "Dongdaemun" means "Great East Gate," and it was so named because it was the major eastern gate in the wall that surrounded Seoul during the Joseon period. The gate is located at Jongno 6-ga in Jongno District.

== History ==
The structure was first built by King Taejo during his fifth year of reign (1398). It was renovated in 1453, and the current structure is the one rebuilt in 1869. Heunginjimun shows architectural style of the late Joseon period. The most unusual characteristic is its built outer wall, Ongseong. Ongseong was constructed to compensate the weakness of the target from multiple invaders, protecting the gate.

== Preservation ==
Heunginjimun is located at the intersection of subway lines 1 and 4, at Dongdaemun station. The gate is within easy reach of exit 1 or exits 6–10 of this station.

Construction of the Dongdaemun Design Plaza, a major urban development landmark designed by Zaha Hadid, started in 2009 to renovate what used to be Dongdaemun Stadium (an amateur baseball park) and was officially inaugurated on March 21, 2014. This landmark, also called the DDP, is the centerpiece of South Korea's fashion hub and popular tourist destination and has been one of the main reasons for Seoul's designation as World Design Capital in 2010.

In August 2011, the roof of the gate was partially damaged by record rainfall. The large amount of rain resulted in chipping of the roof's ridge. An official of the Cultural Heritage Administration stated that "The aged gate underwent repairs in 1998 and seems to have become soaked in heavy rains".

By 2026, the area around Dongdaemun known as Dongdaemun Market has grown into the largest shopping center in South Korea, popular with both foreigners and natives.

== Images ==
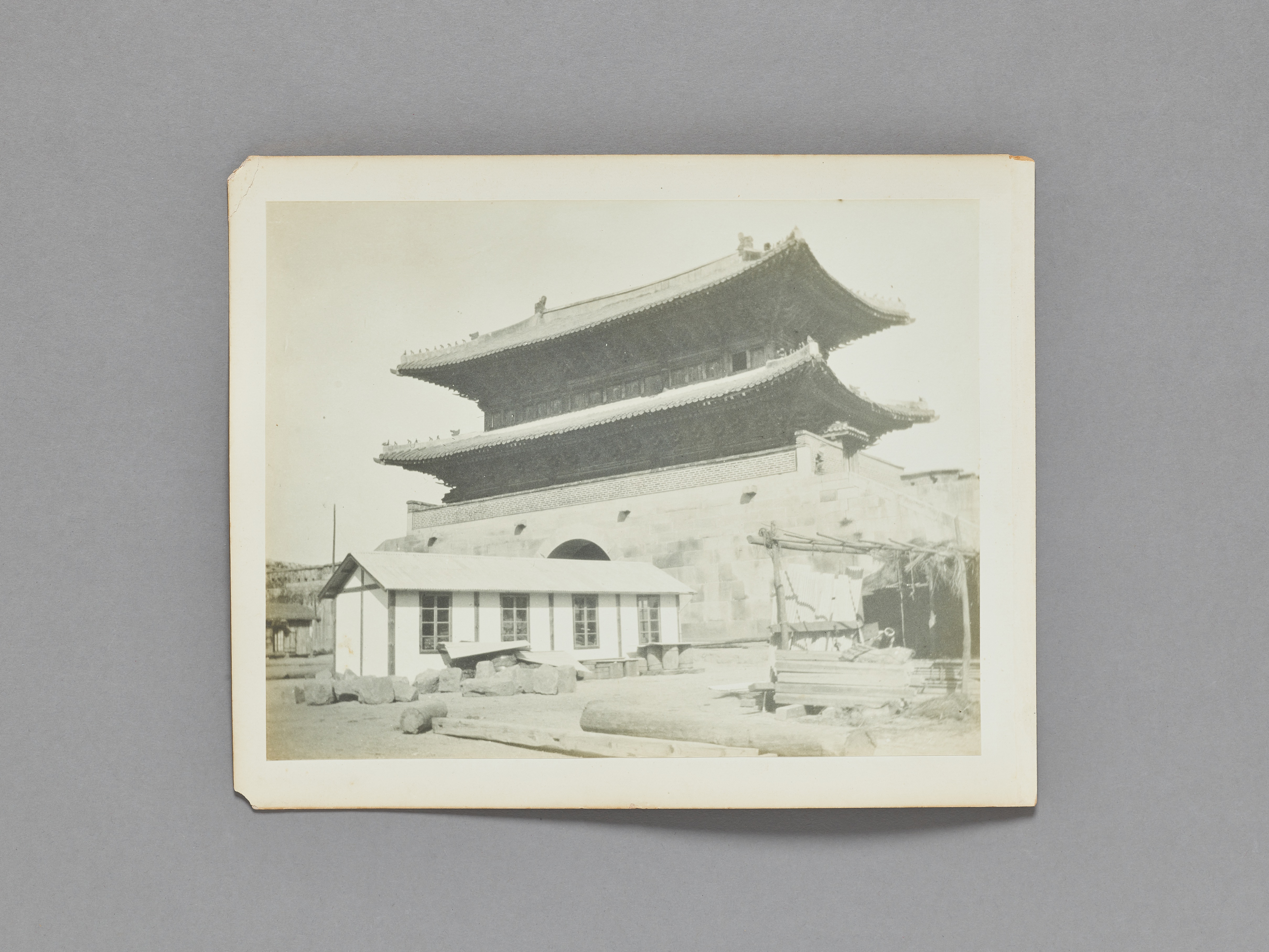
Heunginjimun in 1898 during the railway construction

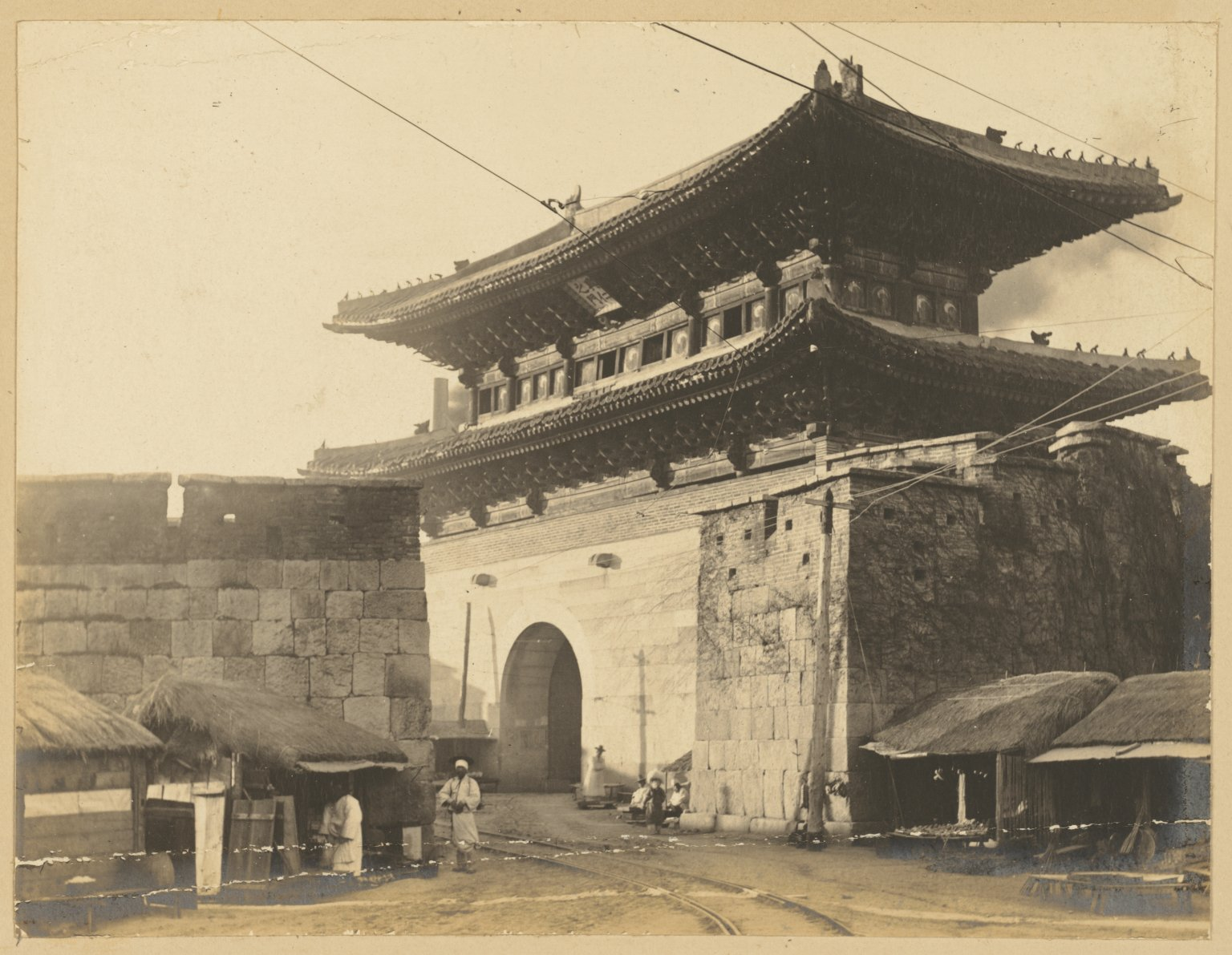
Side of gate, 1904.

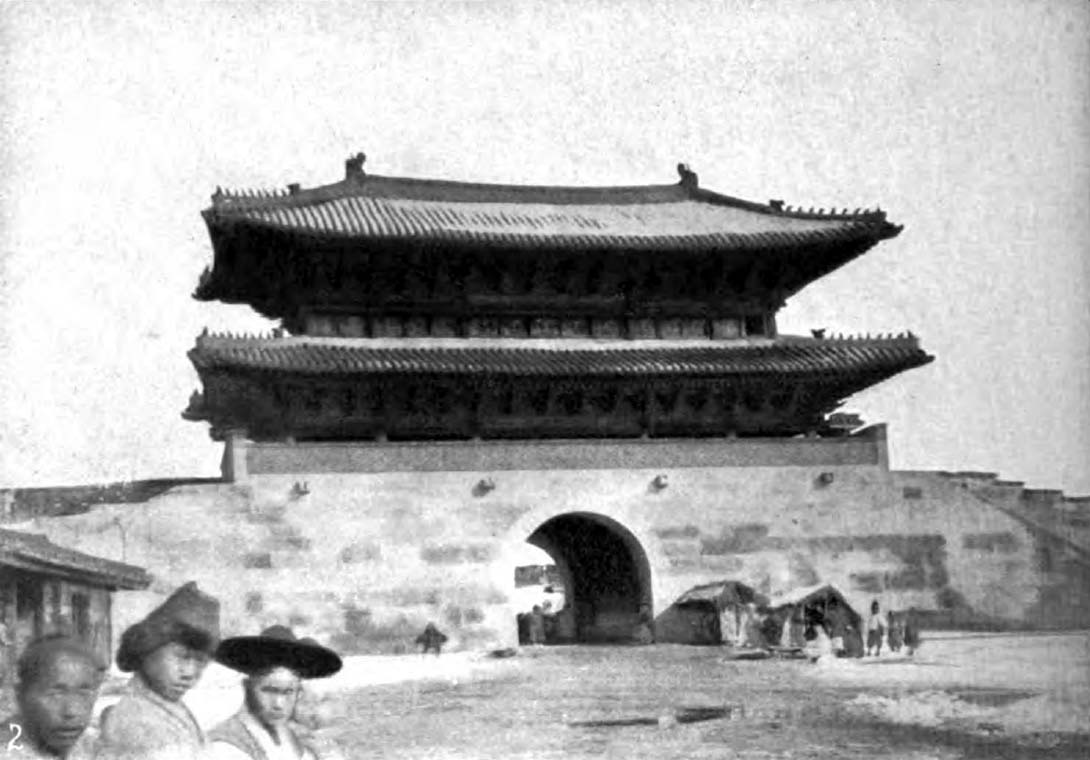
Rear of gate, before 1920.

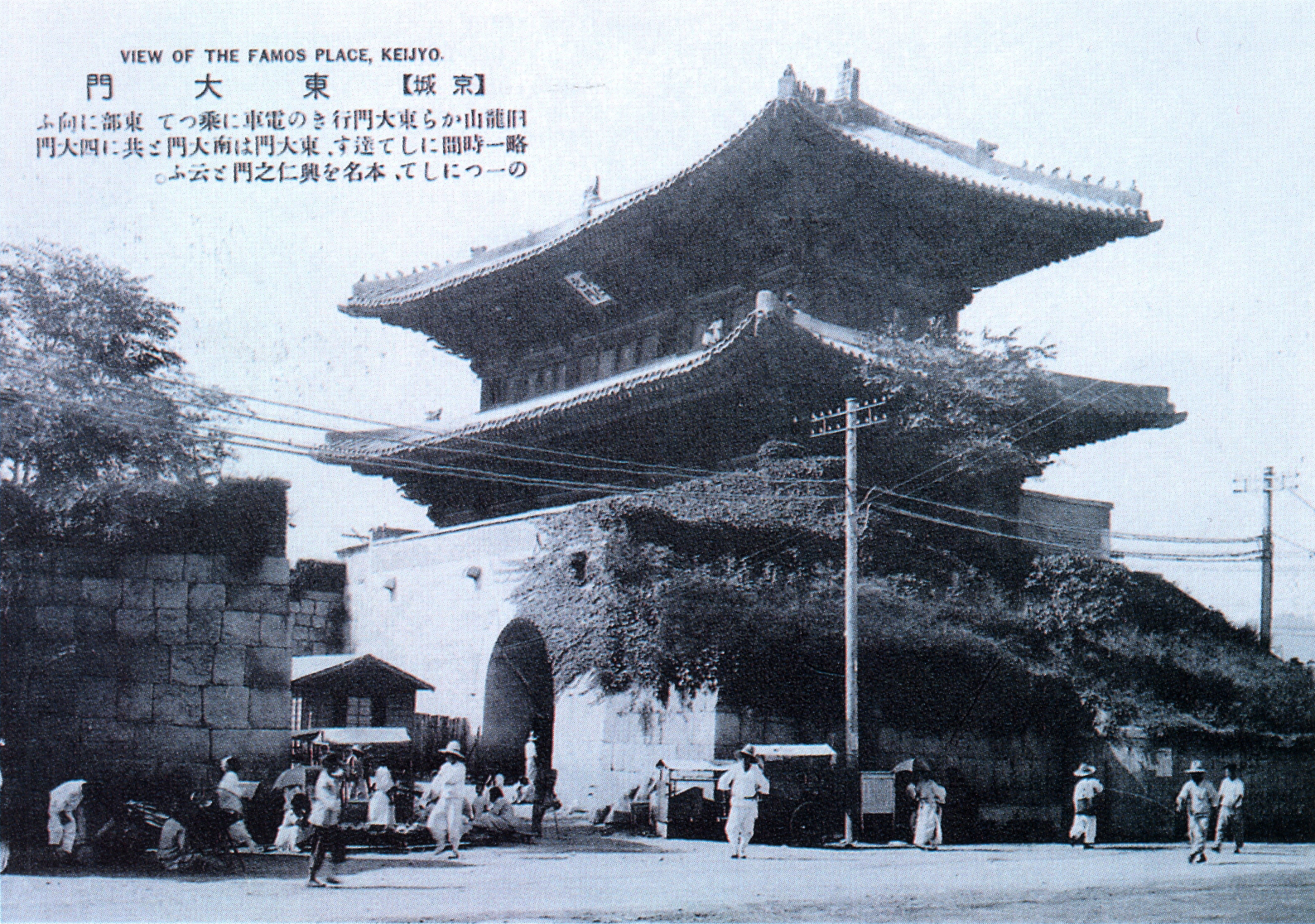
Side of gate, 1930s.

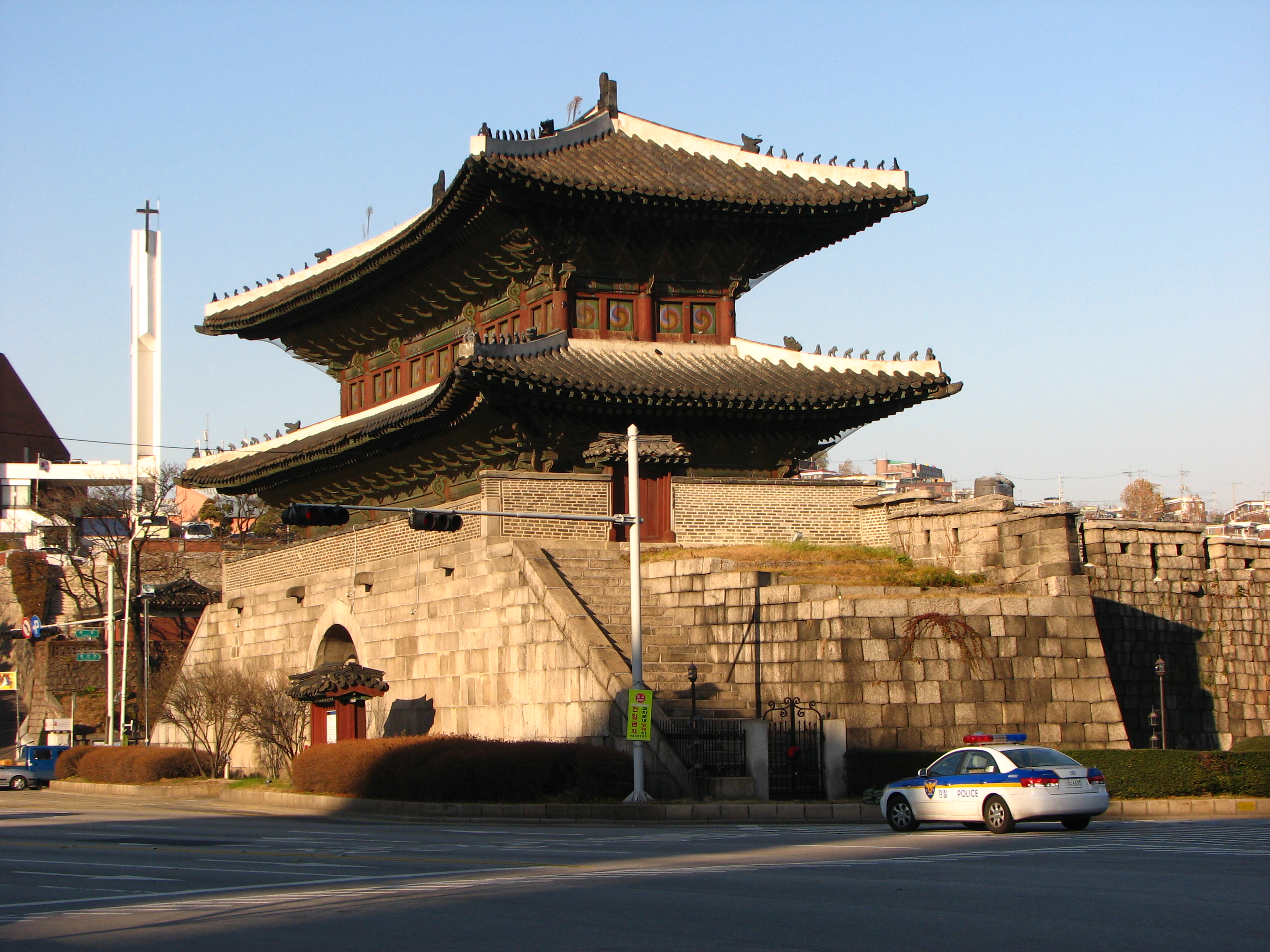
Side of gate, November 2007.

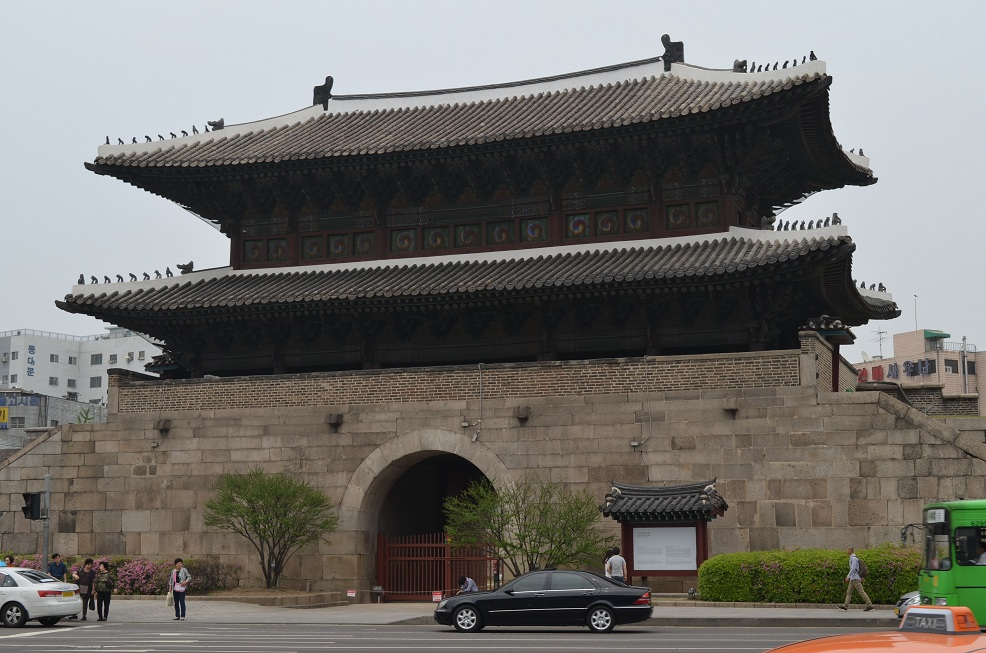
Rear of gate, May 2012.

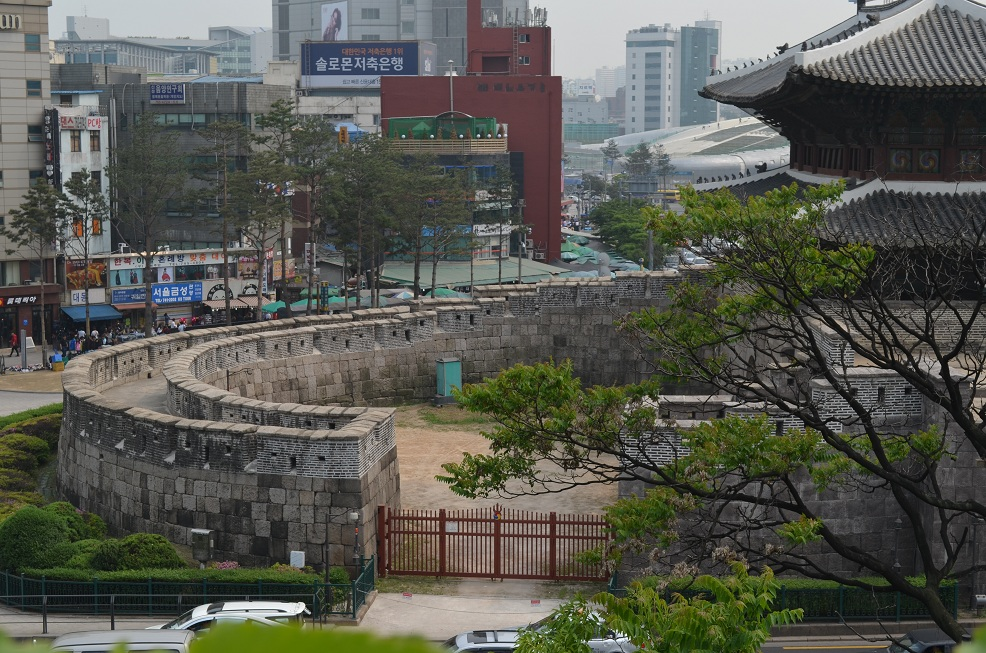
Side of gate, May 2012.

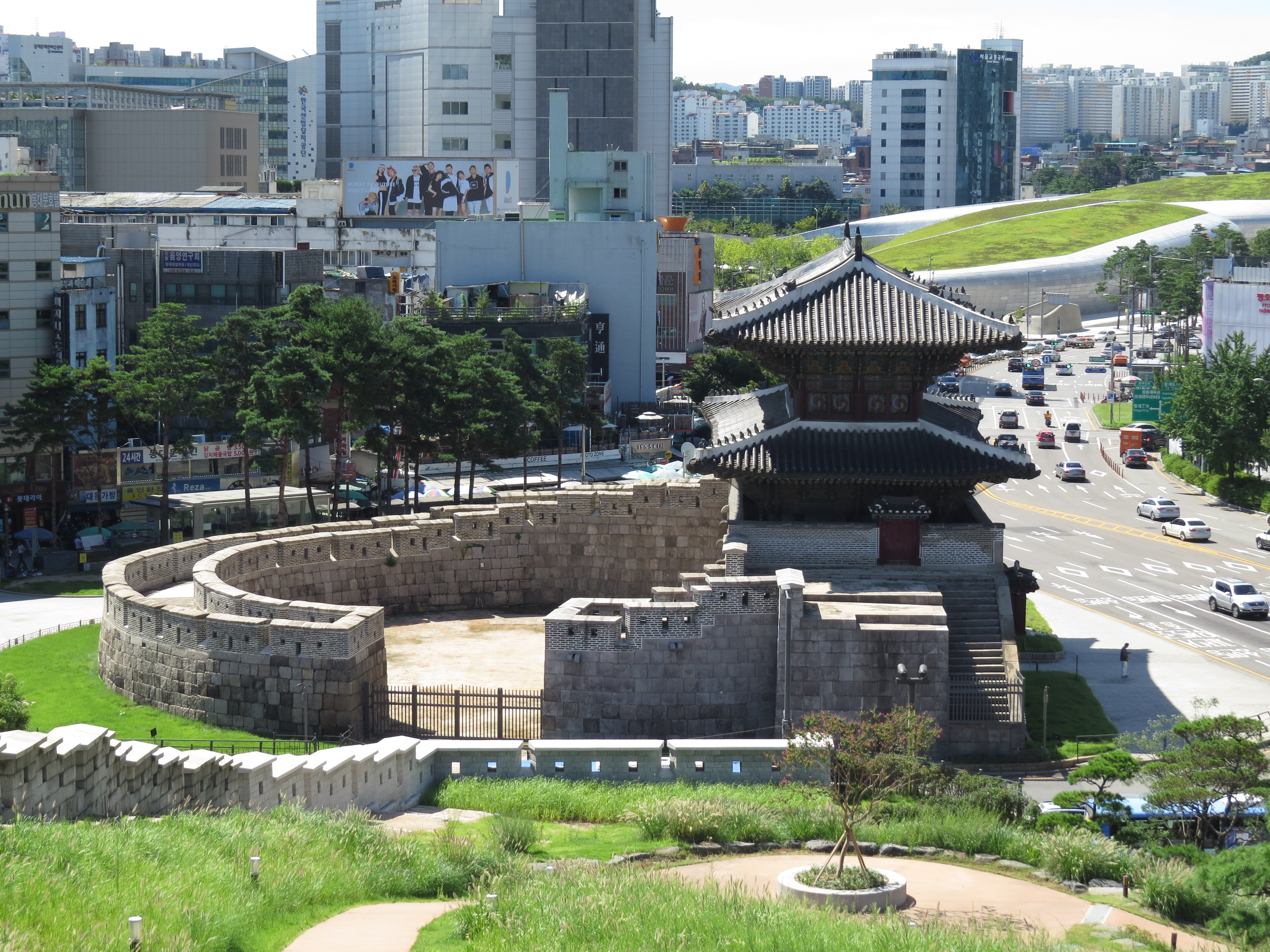
Side of gate, August 2017.

== See also ==
- List of upscale shopping districts
