= Solidarity for LGBT Human Rights of Korea =

South Korean LGBTQ rights organization

- 행동하는 성소수자 인권연대
- Founded at: Seoul, Korea
- Leader: Kwak Yi-kyong
- Website: http://lgbtpride.or.kr/

- Solidarity for LGBT Human Rights of Korea
- Hangul: 행동하는 성소수자 인권연대
- Hanja: 行動하는 姓少數者 人權連帶
- Revised Romanization: Haengdonghaneun Seongsosuja In-gwonyeondae
- McCune–Reischauer: Haengdonghanŭn Sŏngsosjucha In'gwŏnyŏndae

Solidarity for LGBT Human Rights of Korea (Korean: 행동하는 성소수자 인권연대; SLRK) is an LGBT rights and counselling organization created on September 9, 1997 in Seoul, South Korea. The current representative of the organization is Kwak Yi-kyong. Former representatives of the group were Jeong Yol and Chang Byongkeon.

The group was first created as a students' LGBT club named the University Students' LGBT Human Rights Association (Korean: 대학생동성애자인권연합; Hanja: 大學生同性愛者人權聯合; literally Union for University Students' Homosexual Rights), which was later expanded to include comprehensive LGBT's human rights and counseling groups the next years.

In 2013, the organization created the Yookwoodang Literary Award, given to Korean LGBT works of various genres, including poetry, fiction, and essays. The award was named in honor of Yun Hyon-seok, a gay rights activist and poet who used the pen name "Yook Woo Dang".

On 1 March 2015, the Solidarity for LGBT Human Rights of Korea (Korean: 동성애자 인권연대; Hanja: 同性愛者人權連帶; RR: Dongseonaeja Ingwonyeondae; literally Solidarity for Homosexual Rights) reorganized to become the Solidarity for LGBT Human Rights of Korea (Korean: 행동하는 성소수자 인권연대; literally Active Solidarity for Sexual Minority Rights).

== See also ==
- Human rights in South Korea
- LGBT rights in South Korea
- Suicidal ideation in South Korean LGBT youth
