= Ammun (disambiguation) =

Ammun may refer to:

- Ammon, the Romanized version of this ancient Semitic-speaking kingdom
- Ammun (gate), type of gate in traditional Korean architecture
