= Seoul Museum of History =

City history museum in South Korea

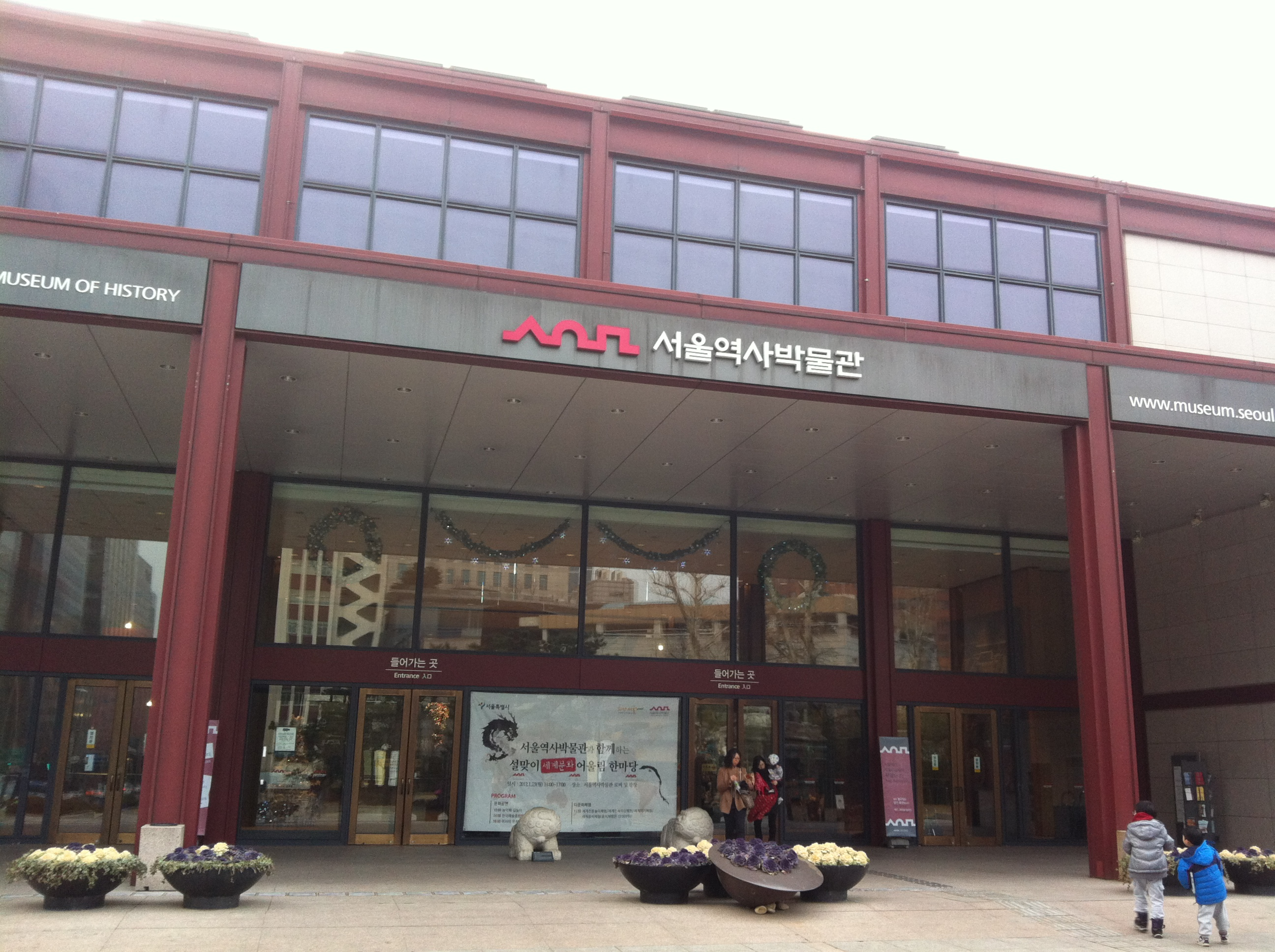
- Museum exterior in 2012
- Established: 21 May 2002
- Location: 55 Saemunan-ro, Jongno-gu, Seoul, South Korea
- Coordinates: 37°34′13.71″N 126°58′14.37″E
- Director: Choi Byung-gu
- Public transit access: Subway Line 5, Seodaemun Station, Exit 4 (641m on foot, 10-minute walk); Subway Line 5, Gwanghwamun Station, Exits 7 & 8 (462m on foot, 7-minute walk)
- Website: museum.seoul.kr/eng/index.do (in English)

Korean name
- Hangul: 서울역사박물관
- Hanja: 서울歷史博物館
- RR: Seoul yeoksa bangmulgwan
- MR: Sŏul yŏksa pangmulgwan

The Seoul Museum of History (Korean: 서울역사박물관) is a history museum about the history of Seoul, the capital of South Korea, located at 55 Saemunan-ro, Jongno-gu, Seoul, South Korea.

== Description ==
The museum depicts the evolution of Seoul from the prehistoric period to the current day. It also hosts special exhibitions on a range of topics.

=== Operating Hours ===
- Tuesday-Sunday 9:00-18:00 (Last Admission at 17:30)
- Open until 21:00 on Fridays

Closed on January 1st and Mondays. If a Monday is a public holiday, the museum is open. Admission is free.

=== Branches ===
It has a number of branch locations throughout Seoul that focus on specific topics:

- Cheonggyecheon Museum
- Seoul City Wall Museum
- Baek In-je House
- Donuimun History Museum
- Gongpyeong Historic Site Museum
- Seoul Urban Life Museum
- Gyeonggyojang House
- Gyeonghuigung Palace
- Gungisi Relics Exhibition Hall
- Dongdaemun History Museum & Stadium Memorial
- Dilkusha
- Seoul Museum of Korean Folk Music

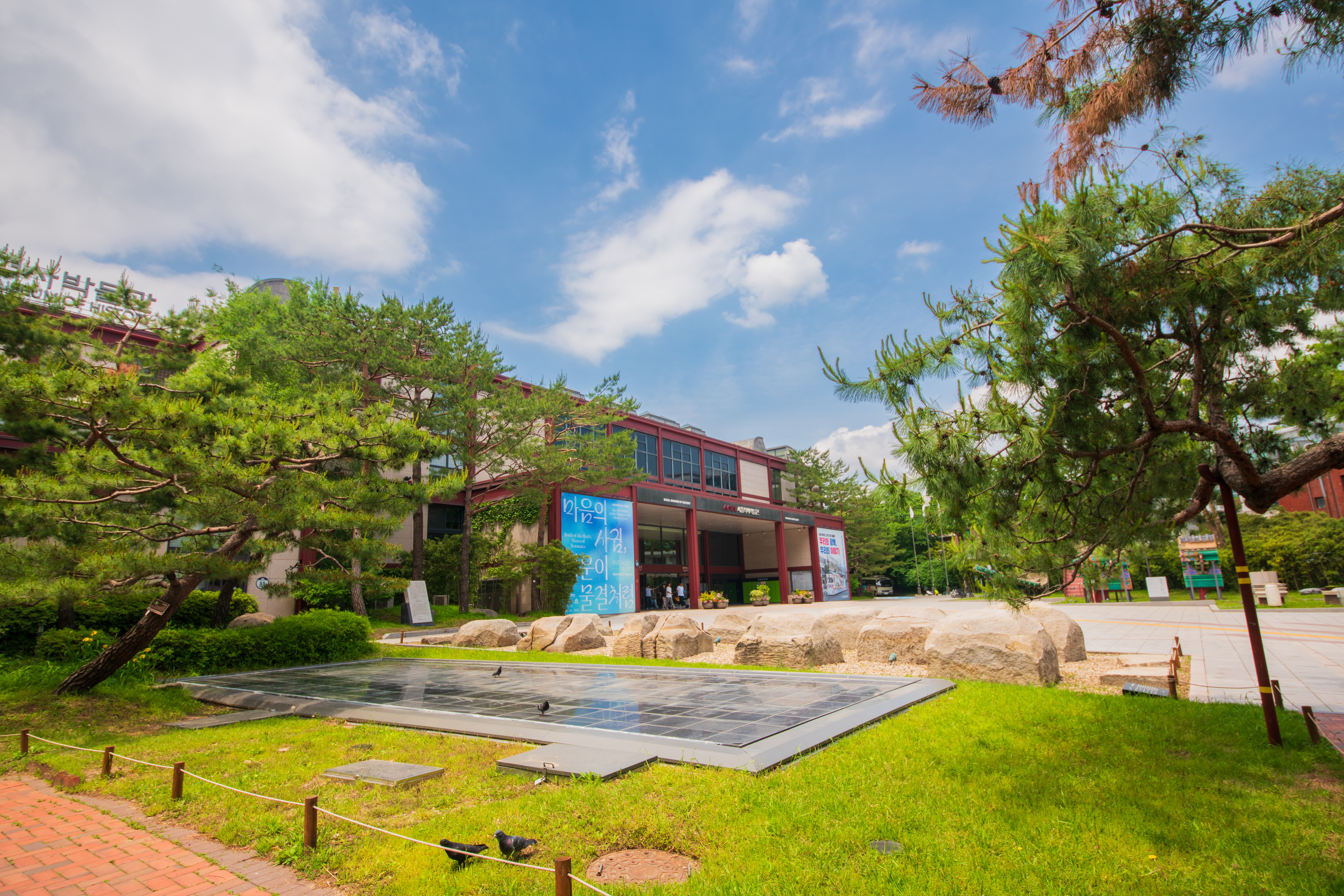
Seoul Museum of History Exterior

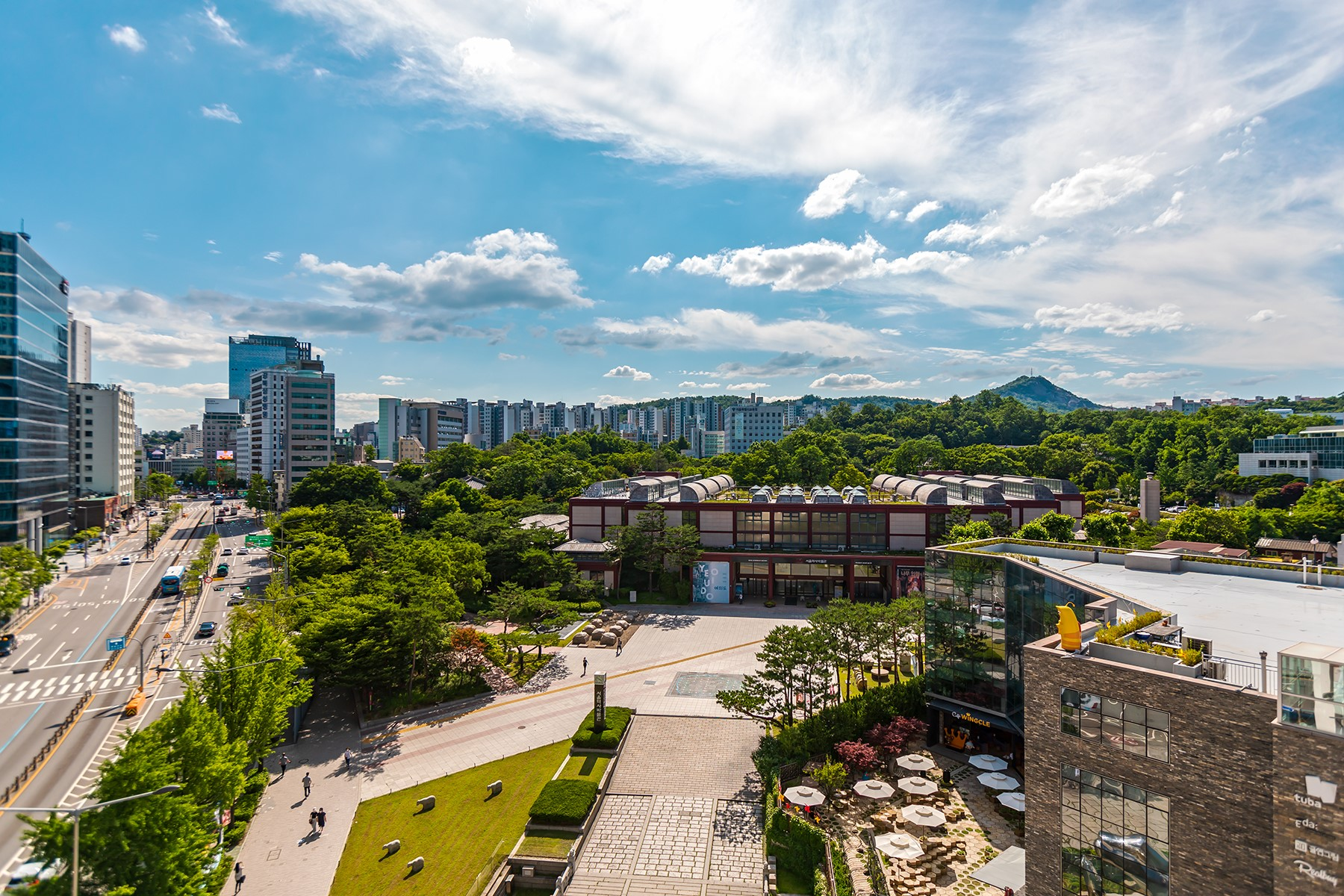
The view of Seoul Museum of History

== History ==
The idea for the museum was first established in 1985, when initial construction plans were drawn up. After several years of preparation, construction began in 1993 and was completed in 1997 under the direction of architect Kim Jong-seong. The museum officially opened to the public in 2002, becoming a central institution dedicated to interpreting the history of Seoul.

Following its opening, the museum gradually expanded beyond a single site. In 2006, it incorporated the Cheonggyecheon Cultural Center, followed by the establishment of the Seoul City Wall Research Center in 2012. The acquisition of Gyeonggyojang House in 2013 and the opening of the Seoul City Wall Museum in 2014 further strengthened its role in managing historic sites.

In 2015, the museum acquired Baek In-je’s House and reorganized the Cheonggyecheon Cultural Center into the Cheonggyecheon Museum. The Donuimun Museum and the Gongpyeong Historic Sites Museum opened in 2018. In 2019, the Seoul Urban Life Museum was established. The Donuimun Museum was renamed the Donuimun History Museum in 2020, and Dilkusha was added in 2021.

These developments reflect the museum’s transition from a single institution into a broader network dedicated to preserving and presenting Seoul’s history.

== Exhibition ==
The museum offers permanent exhibitions on 600-year history of Seoul, as well as special exhibitions on various themes. It also features lobby exhibitions, outdoor exhibit areas, and exhibitions at the children’s museum. Some exhibitions of the Seoul Museum of History can be viewed online through the museum’s website.

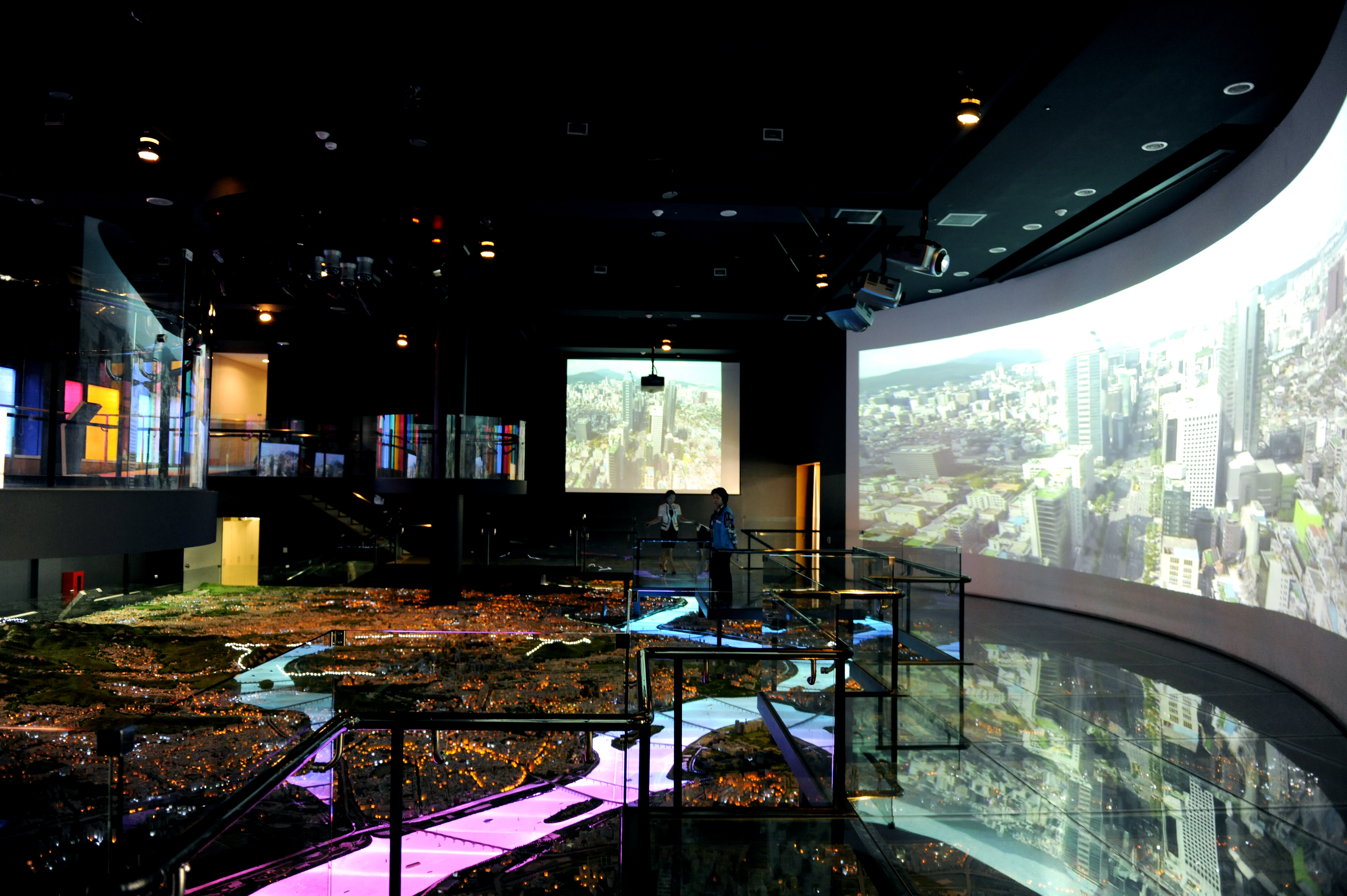
Panoramic City Model Hall in Seoul Museum of History

=== Permanent Exhibition ===
- Zone 1(The Joseon Capital): This section presents Seoul from the founding of the Joseon dynasty to the period before Korea opened its ports to the foreign countries.
- Zone 2(The Capital of the Korean Empire): This section shows Seoul as it developed into a city where traditional elements and modern infludences coexisted.
- Zone 3(Seoul under Japanese Control): This section examines Seoul as a colonial city following Japan’s forced annexation of Korea in 1910.
- Zone 4(The Capital of the Republic of Korea): This section explores the rapid growth and transformation of Seoul after independence.
- The City Model Image Hall(Seoul, Now and Future): This exhibition space features a detailed diorama of Seoul combined with multimedia technology, offering an overview of the city.

== Collections ==
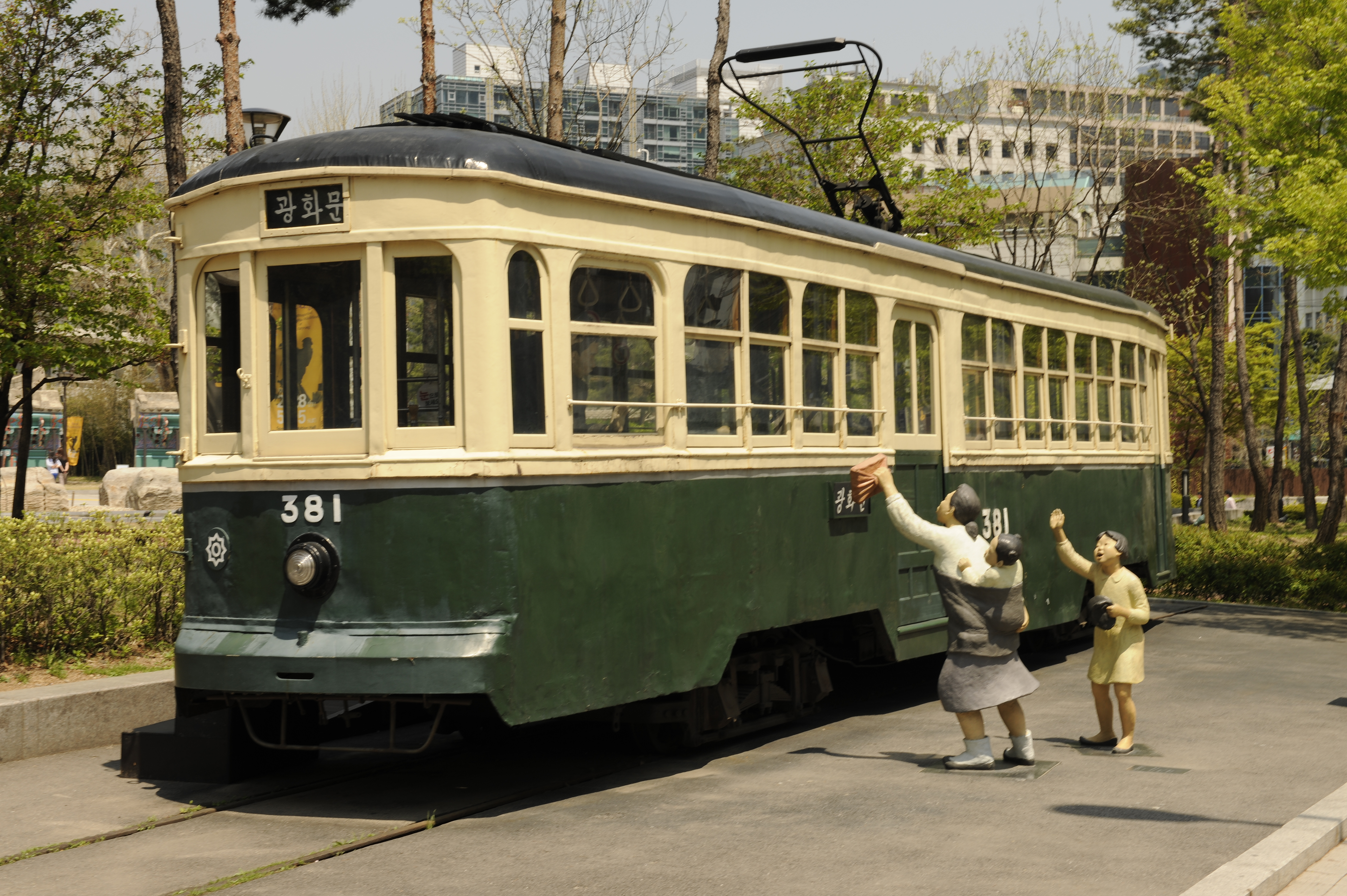
Streetcar No. 381 (National Registered Cultural Heritage No. 467)

The Seoul Museum of History collects and preserves materials related to the history and culture of Seoul. These items have been acquired through various methods, including purchases and donations from citizens. About half of the museum’s collection has been donated, reflecting the support of its patrons in building the collection.

As of 2022, the museum holds approximately 250,000 items. These include 82 designated cultural heritage objects, such as the Daedong yeojido (Map of the Great East), as well as two National Registered Cultural Heritages, 55 Tangible Cultural Heritages of Seoul, one Folklore Resource of Seoul, and one Cultural Heritage Resource of Seoul.

=== Seoul History Archive ===
The Seoul Museum of History’s collection and research materials can be searched and accessed through the Seoul History Archive. The archive was initiated to preserve historical and Seoul studies resources accumulated since the museum’s opening in 2002 by building a database.

These materials were first made available in 2014 through the museum’s website under the name “Seoul Museum of History Digital Archive.” Later, an independent site titled “Seoul History Archive” was launched to share information on Seoul’s history with the public. The Seoul History Archive aims to serve as a central platform for Seoul studies, sharing knowledge and understanding of the city with citizens.

== International Exchange ==
The Seoul Museum of History is engaging in various exchange and cooperative programs with cultural institutions around the world and continues to expand its international partnerships. Since 2002, the museum has held an annual international symposium in collaboration with the Capital Museum in Beijing, the Shenyang Palace Museum in China, and the Edo-Tokyo Museum in Japan. It has also organized joint exhibitions with these museums.

== See also ==
- History of Seoul
- History of Korea
- List of museums in Seoul
- List of museums in South Korea
