= Seoul History Archives =

South Korean history materials website

- Available in: Korean
- Founded: 2014
- Country of origin: South Korea
- Owner: Seoul Museum of History
- Services: Sharing the museum's digital collection
- Website: https://museum.seoul.go.kr/archive/NR_index.do (in Korean)
- Commercial: no

- Seoul History Archives
- Hangul: 서울역사아카이브
- RR: Seoul yeoksa akaibeu
- MR: Sŏul yŏksa ak'aibŭ

The Seoul History Archives (Korean: 서울역사아카이브) is a service operated by the Seoul Museum of History in Seoul, South Korea. Its website was first opened to the public in 2014.

Its purpose is to provide materials and knowledge to the general public, free of charge. Beginning in 2020, many of its materials have been available for non-commercial and even commercial use. As of February 2023, it had a total of 26,131 items in its collection. In 2020, 36,869 items were downloaded by the public, with usage continually increasing since. This number was a 50% increase from the previous year's number of 24,275.
