= Gyeonghuigung =

Palace in Seoul, South Korea

Gyeonghui Palace
- 경희궁
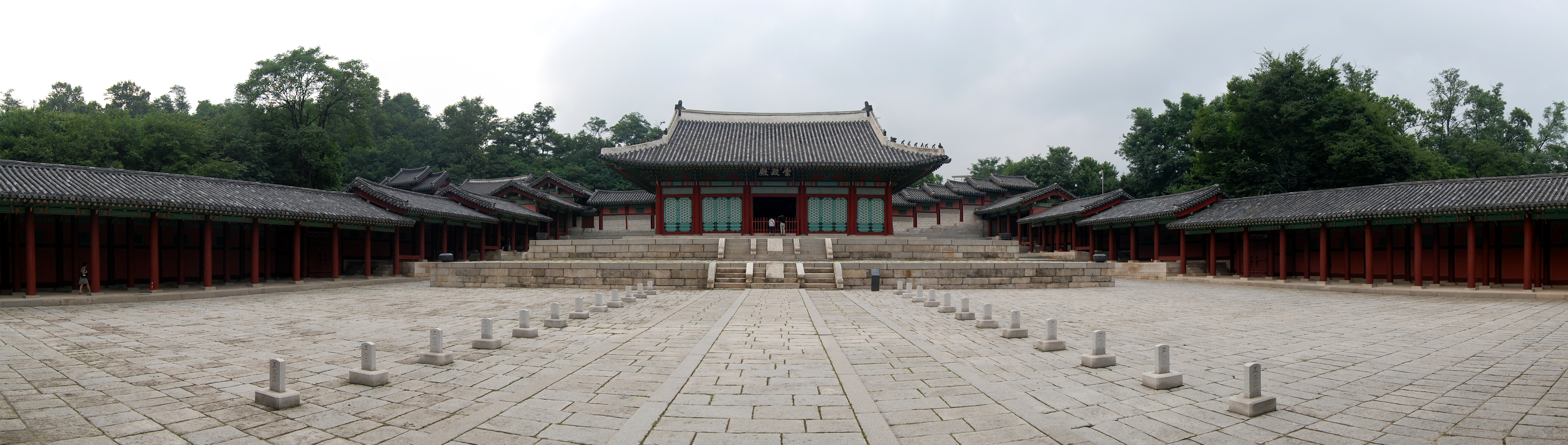
- Interactive map of the Gyeonghui Palace area

General information
- Architectural style: Korean
- Location: Seoul, South Korea
- Coordinates: 37°34′17.20″N 126°58′05.30″E
- Current tenants: Seoul Museum of History; The Seoul Museum annex of art
- Construction started: 17th century 1990s (partially rebuilt)

Korean name
- Hangul: 경희궁
- Hanja: 慶熙宮
- RR: Gyeonghuigung
- MR: Kyŏnghŭigung

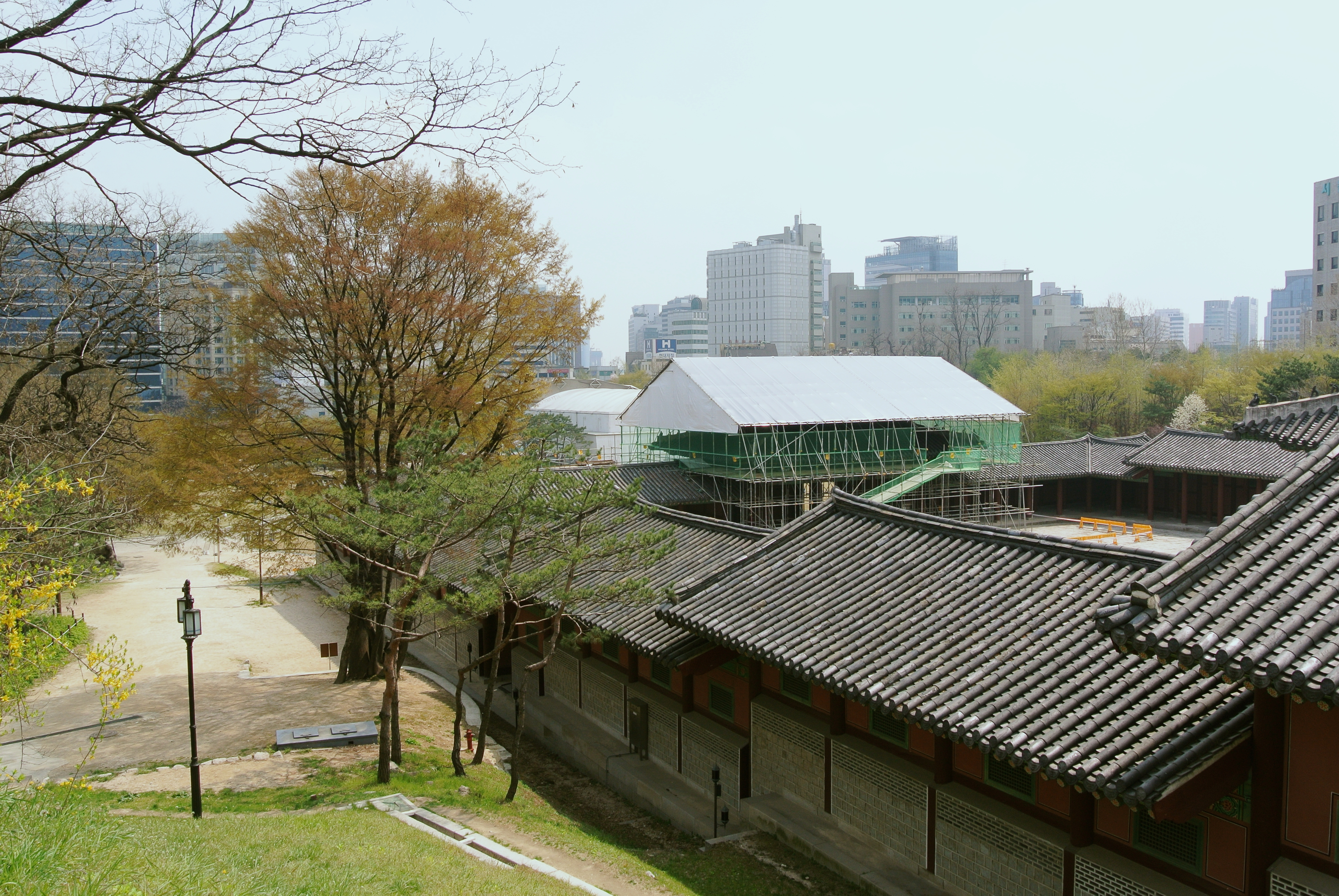
Restoration of Gyeonghuigung and view of its surroundings.

Gyeonghuigung (Korean: 경희궁; Hanja: 慶熙宮, lit. 'Palace of Serene Harmony') is a palace located in Seoul, South Korea. It was one of the "Five Grand Palaces" built by the Joseon Dynasty.

== History ==
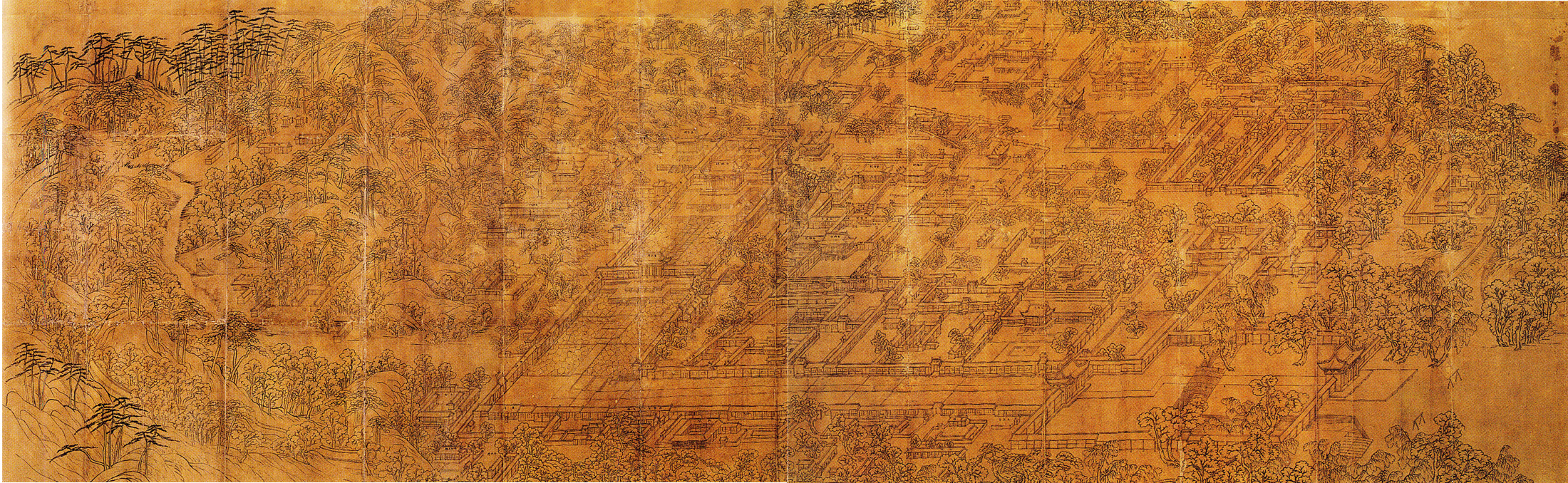
Seogwoldoan (서궐도안), the landscape painting of Gyeonghuigung.

The land where Gyeonghuigung stood was originally the site of the house of Prince Jeongwon, who was the father of King Injo. Construction began in the 1600s during the reign of King Gwanghaegun and was completed in 1617. The name of the palace was originally Gyeongdeokgung (경덕궁; 慶德宮), but it was later changed to avoid naming it similar to the posthumous name of Prince Jeongwon. In the latter Joseon period, Gyeonghuigung served as the secondary palace (which was called igung (離宮) in those times) for the king, and as it was situated on the west side of Seoul, it was also called Seo-gwol (西闕, a palace of the west). The secondary palace was usually the palace where the King moves to in times of emergency.

From King Injo to King Cheoljong, about ten kings of Joseon dynasty stayed here at Gyeonghuigung. For a time, it was of a considerable size that contained 100 buildings. For the king's royal audience, there were the Sungjeongjeon and Jajeongjeon buildings, and for sleeping, Yungbokjeon (융복전; 隆福殿) and Hoesangjeon (회상전; 會祥殿) buildings. The palace also used to have an arched bridge that connected it with Deoksugung called Honggyo (홍교; 虹橋).

Most of Gyeonghuigung was lost in the 19th century, first due to a fire that broke out during the reigns of King Sunjo, although the palace was rebuilt later, Heungseon Daewongun dismantled large part of the palace for construction materials to rebuild Gyeongbokgung. The Japanese dismantled what remained of the palace during their occupation of the Korean peninsula, and the Keijo Middle School was built on the site for Japanese citizens, which later became Seoul High School. Two major structures of the former palace — the Sungjeongjeon throne hall and the Heunghwamun gate — were disassembled and moved to other parts of Seoul. Reconstruction started after Seoul High School moved out from the site in 1980, also as part of the South Korean government's initiative to rebuild the "Five Grand Palaces" that were heavily destroyed by the Japanese.

== Architecture ==
=== Heunghwamun ===
Heunghwamun (흥화문; 興化門) is the main entrance door to the palace. The entrance was built in 1616, but it was briefly moved to be an entrance for the Bakmunsa Temple after the destruction of the palace, and later reused as a main entrance for the Hotel Shilla of Jangchung-dong until it was finally restored to its original purpose. Heunghwamun is designated as Municipal Treasure 19.

=== Geuncheongyo ===
Geuncheongyo (금천교; 禁川橋) is a bridge at the route passed through the Heunghwamun. It was built in 1619, but was buried into soil during Japanese rule until it was restored in 2001.

=== Sungjeongjeon ===
Sungjeongjeon (숭정전; 崇政殿) is the main hall of the palace. It was built in 1616 but was moved to Dongguk University in 1926 and repurposed as a Buddhist temple during the Japanese colonial period, and moved back to original location and renovated between 1988 and 1994. Its considered an example of mid-Joseon period architecture. Sungjeongjeon is designated as Municipal Treasure 20.

=== Jajeongjeon ===
Jajeongjeon (자정전; 資政殿) is a hall restored following depictions in Seogwoldoan.

=== Taenyeongjeon ===
Taenyeongjeon (태령전; 泰寧殿) is a hall restored following depictions in Seogwoldoan.

== Present use ==
It is Historic Site No. 271.

In the palace grounds today are the Seoul Museum of History and the Seoul Museum of Art. It also housed Prada's Transformer in 2009.

== See also ==
- List of palaces
- Korean architecture
- History of Korea
