= Prada Transformer =

2009 pavilion in Seoul, South Korea

The Prada Transformer was a temporary, shape-shifting pavilion located in Seoul, South Korea. It had four different apparent shapes, depending on the function for which the pavilion is needed at the moment (ground plans: hexagon, cross, rectangle or circle). The pavilion was commissioned by Prada and designed by Rem Koolhaas' architecture firm Office for Metropolitan Architecture. It was inaugurated in April 2009 and dismantled in October 2009.

== History ==
The pavilion was commissioned by Prada and designed by Rem Koolhaas' architecture firm Office for Metropolitan Architecture. The brand had already hired the architect to design Prada's flagship stores in New York and Los Angeles, and the Prada Foundation for Contemporary Art building in Milan. The pavilion was first used for the fashion exhibition Waist Down - Skirts by Miuccia Prada, which began April 25, 2009. Its form and function was first changed on June 26, 2009, into a movie theater.

The pavilion was dismantled six months after it was inaugurated, in October 2009.

== Description ==
The pavilion was located in Seoul, South Korea, next to the Gyeonghui Palace. It was roughly in the shape of a tetrahedron. Cranes rotated the structure so that different surfaces of the tetrahedron face downward, thereby changing the pavilion's form and function. The different faces of the tetrahedron are actually shapes other than triangles. The pavilion's base was a hexagon when used for a fashion exhibition, a rectangle when used as a movie theater, a cross when used for an art exhibition and a circle when used for a special event.

The external cover of the pavilion was a smooth elastic membrane.

The engineering companies LG Electronics, Hyundai Motor Company and Red Resource Inc. contributed to the design of the pavilion.
