= Ammun (gate) =

Traditional Korean gates

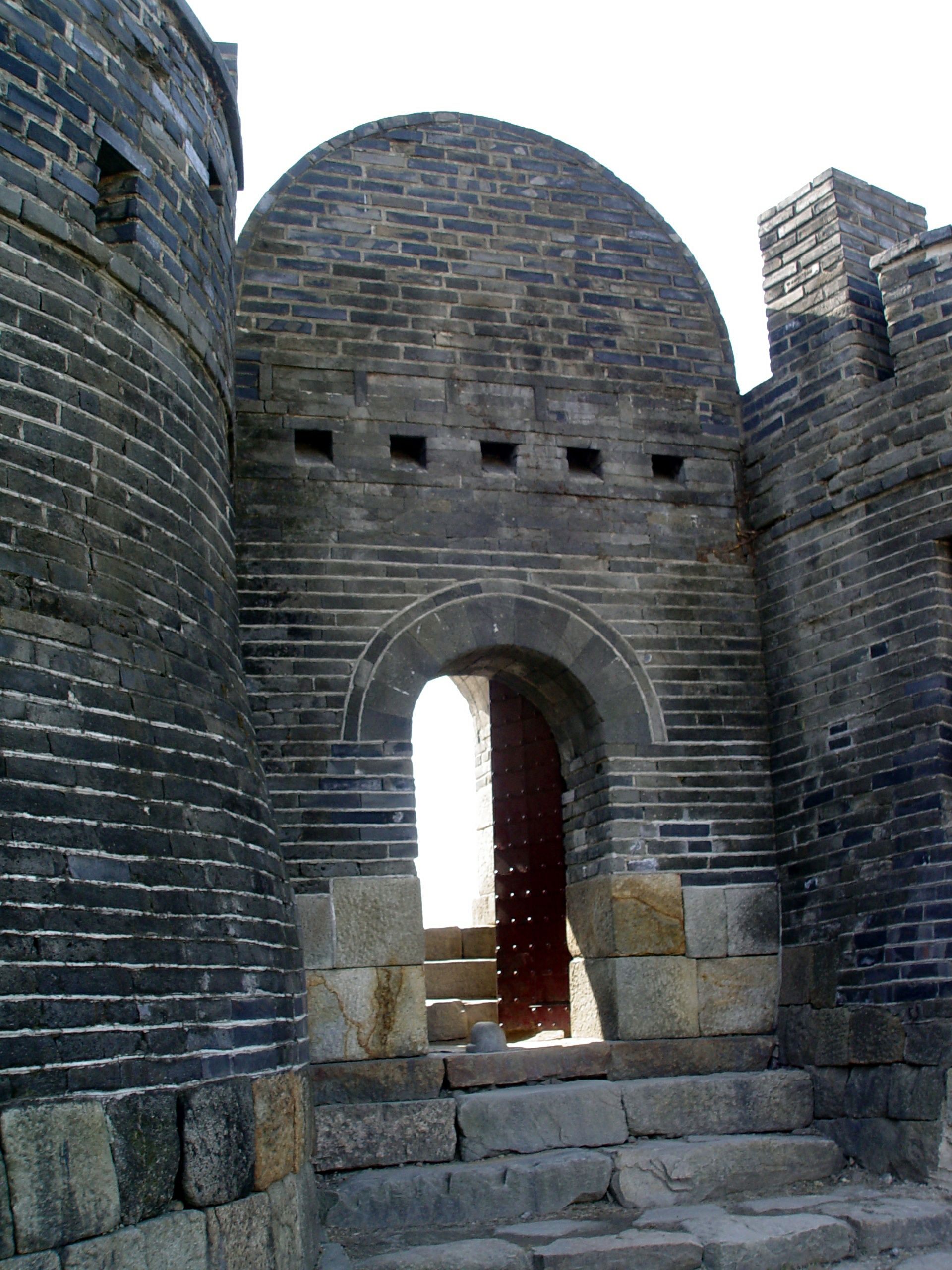
Ammun of the Hwaseong Fortress

Ammun (Korean: 암문) is a type of gate in traditional Korean architecture that was built without intentionally building a gate tower in the castle walls. It was usually built in a remote or deep place so that the general public or enemies would not know about it, and it was used to secretly transport supplies.

It is built in the form of a hole in the wall without a gate tower. It was built to allow passage when the enemy blocks the main gate in case of emergency. There are a total of 9 secret gates in Hanyangdoseong.
