= Seoul City Wall Museum =

Museum in Jongno, Seoul, South Korea

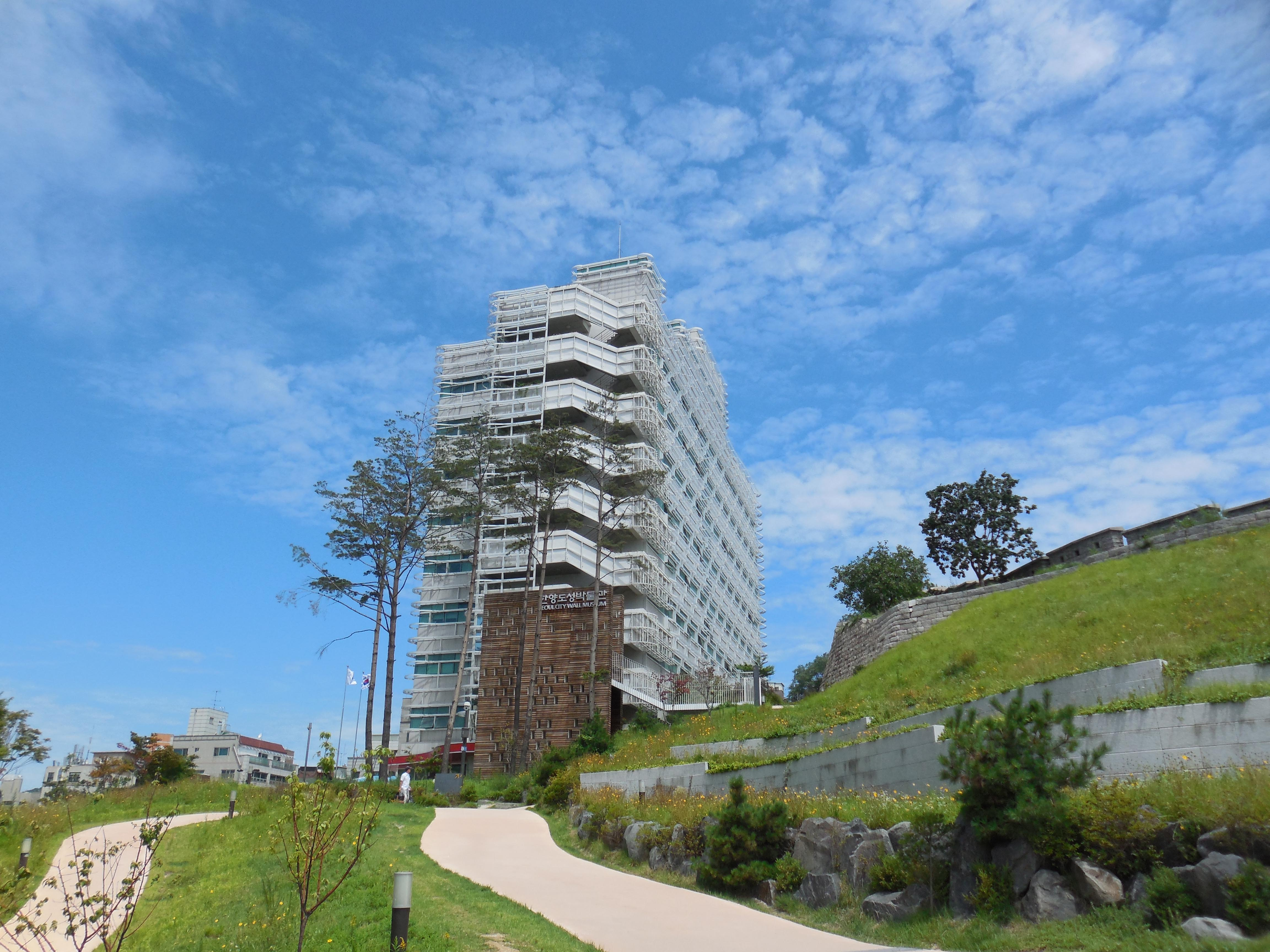
- Established: 31 July 2014
- Location: Jongno, Seoul, South Korea
- Coordinates: 37°34′22.2″N 127°0′30.6″E
- Type: museum

Korean name
- Hangul: 한양도성박물관
- Hanja: 漢陽都城博物館
- RR: Hanyang doseong bangmulgwan
- MR: Hanyang tosŏng pangmulgwan

The Seoul City Wall Museum (Korean: 한양도성박물관) is a museum for the Seoul City Wall in Jongno-5.6 ga Subdistrict, Jongno District, Seoul, South Korea.

== History ==
The museum was opened on 31 July 2014.

== Architecture ==
The museum consists of permanent exhibition hall, temporary exhibition hall, information center and multipurpose lecture room.

== Exhibitions ==
The museum exhibits artifacts related to the history and transformation of Seoul City and the Fortress Wall of Seoul.

== Transportation ==
The museum is accessible within walking distance north of Dongdaemun Station of Seoul Metro.

== See also ==
- Seoul City Wall
- List of museums in South Korea
