= Seoul Urban Life Museum =

Museum in Seoul, South Korea

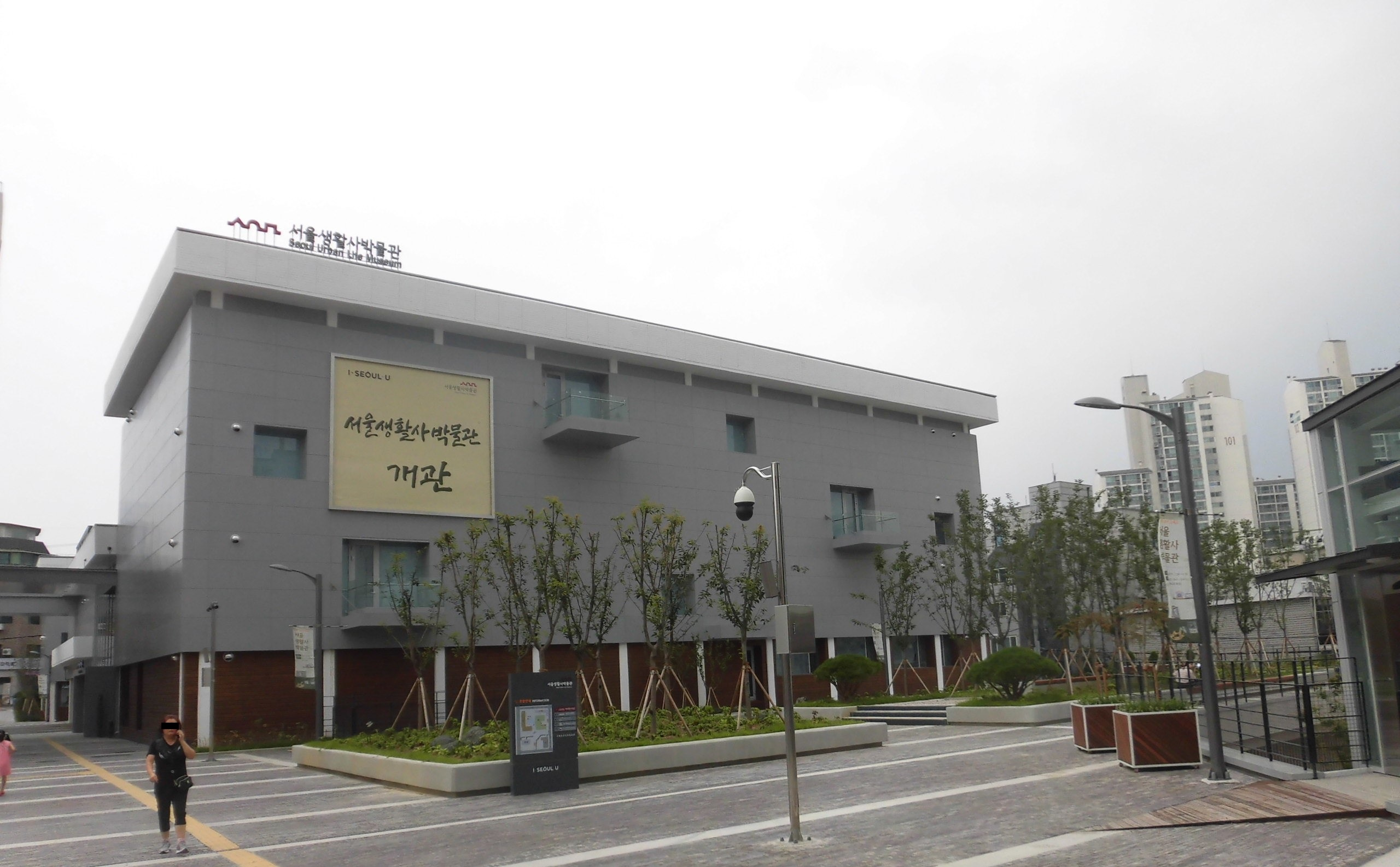
- The museum exterior (2019)
- Established: September 26, 2019
- Location: Nowon District, Seoul, South Korea
- Coordinates: 37.6196°N 127.0767°E
- Type: Urban history museum
- Website: museum.seoul.go.kr/sulm/index.do (in Korean)

Seoul Urban Life Museum (Korean: 서울생활사박물관) is a history museum in Nowon District, Seoul, South Korea. It first opened on September 26, 2019, and focuses on the history of how people lived in Seoul over time. Admission is reportedly free.

At time of opening, the museum had a collection of over 1,000 items across much of the 20th century. It consisted of three buildings (one main and two annex) that ranged from one to five floors in height. The total floor area was 6,919 m^{2} (74,480 ft^{2}).

The museum has experiential sections intended for children, where people can participate in activities such as seeing Seoul through the eyes of an ant. There are also firefighter and police experiences. The museum has held exhibits on various specific topics. In early 2022, it held an exhibit of how fashion in Seoul changed from 1945 to 2020. From November 2022 to April 2023, it held an exhibit on homes in Seoul from the 1950s to late 1970s.
