= Seoul City Wall =

Wall around Downtown Seoul, South Korea

- 서울 한양도성 (Korean)
- Hanyangdoseong (한양도성)
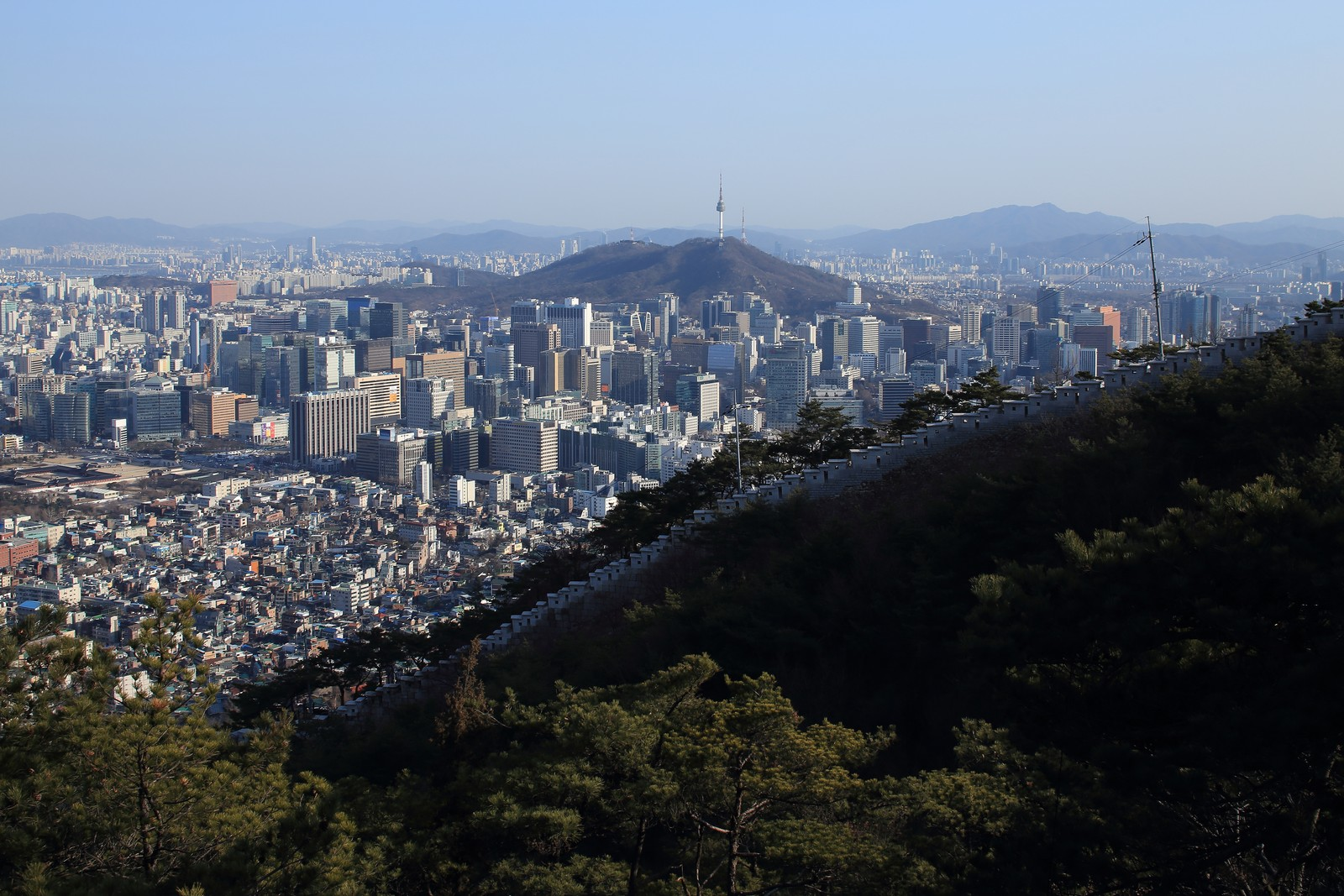
- View of the Downtown Seoul surrounded by the Seoul City Wall

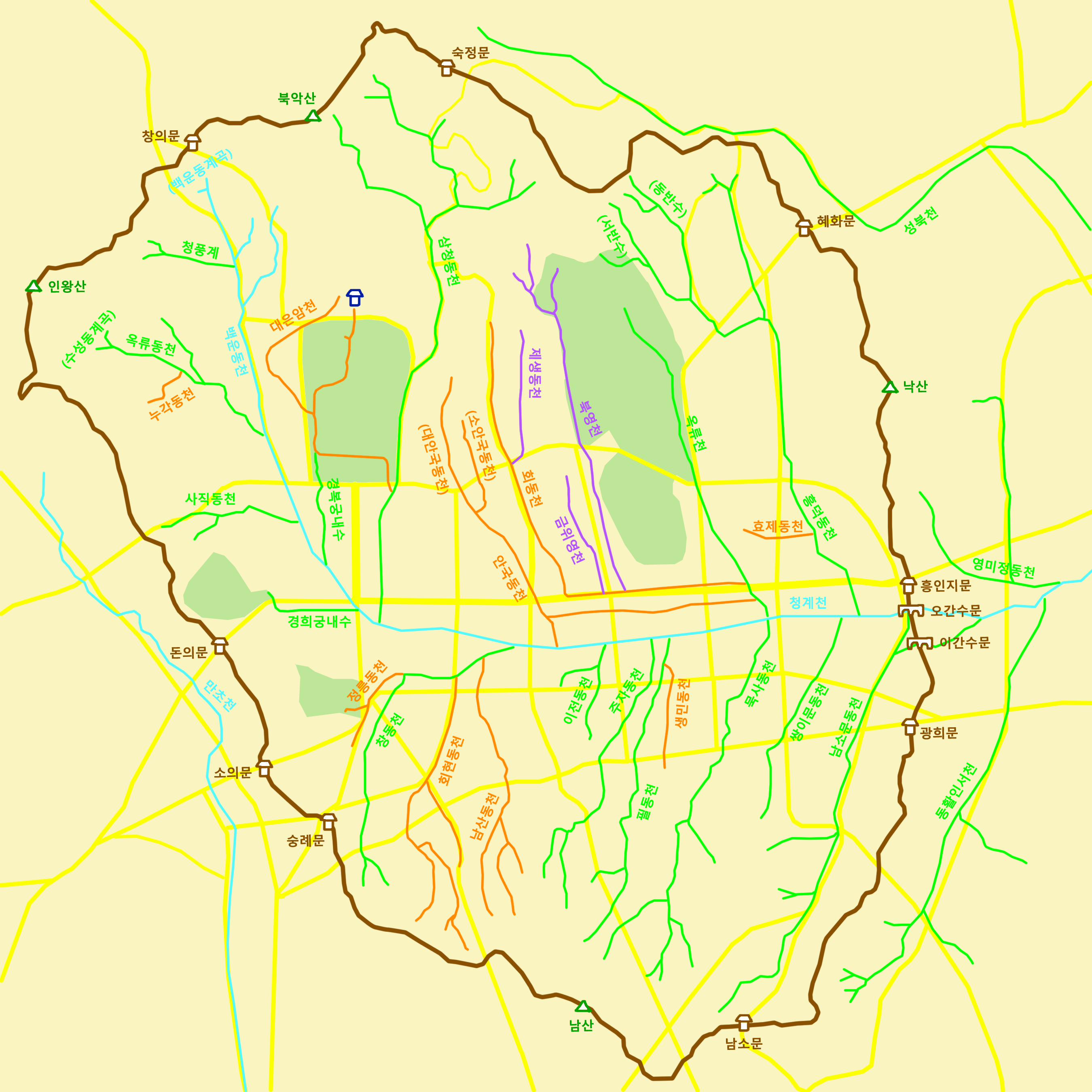
- The wall (brown line) over a map of Downtown Seoul
- 37.5728474°N 127.0085027°E
- Type: Fortification
- Location: Seoul, South Korea

History
- Built: c. 1395–1396
- Built for: Defense of Joseon's capital city, Hanseongbu

Site notes
- Area: Downtown Seoul
- Governing body: Seoul Metropolitan Government
- Owner: National Government of South Korea
- Website: seoulcitywall.seoul.go.kr

Historic Sites of South Korea
- Official name: Hanyangdoseong, the Seoul City Wall
- Designated: 1963-01-21
- Reference no.: 10

Korean name
- Hangul: 서울 한양도성; 서울 성곽
- Hanja: 서울 漢陽都城; 서울 城郭
- Revised Romanization: Seoul Hanyangdoseong; Seoul seonggwak
- McCune–Reischauer: Sŏul Hanyangdosŏng; Sŏul sŏnggwak

The Seoul City Wall (Korean: 서울 성곽) or Hanyang Doseong (한양도성) is a defensive wall first built by the King Taejo of Joseon dynasty to defend the downtown area of Joseon's capital city Hanseong (한성; 漢城). It was designated as a Historic Site of South Korea in 1963, and is currently a tourist attraction around Downtown Seoul.

== History ==
Construction of the Seoul City Wall was launched in 1395, and significant part of the whole City Wall was completed in 1396, including the Eight Gates. While the City Wall was continuously fortified through almost the entire history of the Joseon dynasty period, its history of fortification can be divided into three major periods during the 14th, 15th and 18th centuries.

In the early era of Joseon, one of major function of the City Wall was as an administrative demarcation distinguishing the downtown area of the capital city named as Seong-jung (성중; 城中) or Doseong-an (도성 안; lit. 'inside the fortress'), from urban peripheral areas named as Seongjeosimni (성저십리; 城底十里; lit. '10 ri's around the fortress'). After Joseon suffered an invasion from Japan in the 1590s by Toyotomi Hideyoshi and another invasion almost 40 years later by the Qing Empire, the City Wall was redeveloped during late Joseon period to strengthen military functions.

During the colonial era of Joseon under the Japanese empire, significant parts of the City Wall and its gates were demolished by the Japanese colonial government to modernize the cityscape of Seoul. One notable demolition is the west gate of the City Wall, Seodaemun. However, even through this period of harsh modernization, much of the City Wall survives to the present day in the Jongno and Jung districts of Seoul, it is now preserved as Historic Sites of South Korea. The City Wall is a famous tourist attraction, and still functions as a cultural boundary distinguishing Seoul's original city center of Downtown Seoul from other parts of Seoul city.

== Characteristics ==
The original walls, built in the late 14th century, were constructed of medium-sized round stones held together by mud. During King Sejong the Great's reign in the mid-15th century, a large-scale refurbishment work was carried out on the wall, including the replacement of earthen wall sections with rectangular stone sections. A major restoration in 1704 by King Sukjong rebuilt sections of the wall using large, uniform stone slabs which mark the final and last unique characteristic of Hanyangdoseong.

The eastern section of Seoul was on lower ground than the other sections and was more susceptible to external attack. Thus, a lookout was added to the outside of the gate to reinforce its defense. A part of the walls in the section between Heunginjimun and Gwanghuimun was extended outside in a rectangular shape for such a purpose. Beacon mounds, another component of the defense system, were first established in 1394 and remained in operation until 1894. Signals sent across the country from one mound to another, using smoke by day and fire at night, were received by the beacon at the top of Namsan and conveyed to the Royal Palace. One lit beacon indicated normalcy, two indicated the appearance of an enemy, three if the enemy approached the border, four if the enemy crossed the border and five in case a battle started at the border.

=== Gates ===
Four main gates and four auxiliary gates were built around Seoul in the late 14th century. The four main gates were Dongdaemun (East Gate), Seodaemun (West Gate), Namdaemun (South Gate) and Sukjeongmun (North Gate). The four auxiliary gates were placed in areas between the four main gates, with Souimun (in the southwest), Changuimun (in the northwest), Hyehwamun (in the northeast) and Gwanghuimun (in the southeast).

At present, the following gates are either preserved in their original form or have undergone restoration work: Sungnyemun (South Gate) and Heunginjimun (East Gate) are designated as National Treasure No. 1 and Treasure No. 1, respectively.

== Present condition ==
Hanyangdoseong, completed in 30 years, was torn down in many parts due to city planning initiatives and the introduction of trams lines. However, significant sections of the wall remain. The best-preserved and well-known course is the Wall of Mt. Bukaksan, the 2.3-km trail which cuts through Sukjeongmun to Changuimun. Previously off-limits to the public after having been designated as a Military Reserve area due to its close proximity to Cheongwadae, it opened to the public in 2006. With very few alterations or artificial structures surrounding the area over the years, the natural environment remains relatively intact.

== Trail tour ==
The city of Seoul operates the Hanyangdoseong stamp trail tour, which runs along the wall, divided into six trails:

- Baegak Mountain Trail
- Naksan Mountain Trail
- Heunginjimun Gate Trail
- Namsan(Mongmyeoksan) Mountain Trail
- Sungnyemun Gate Trail
- Inwangsan Mountain Trail

== Gallery ==
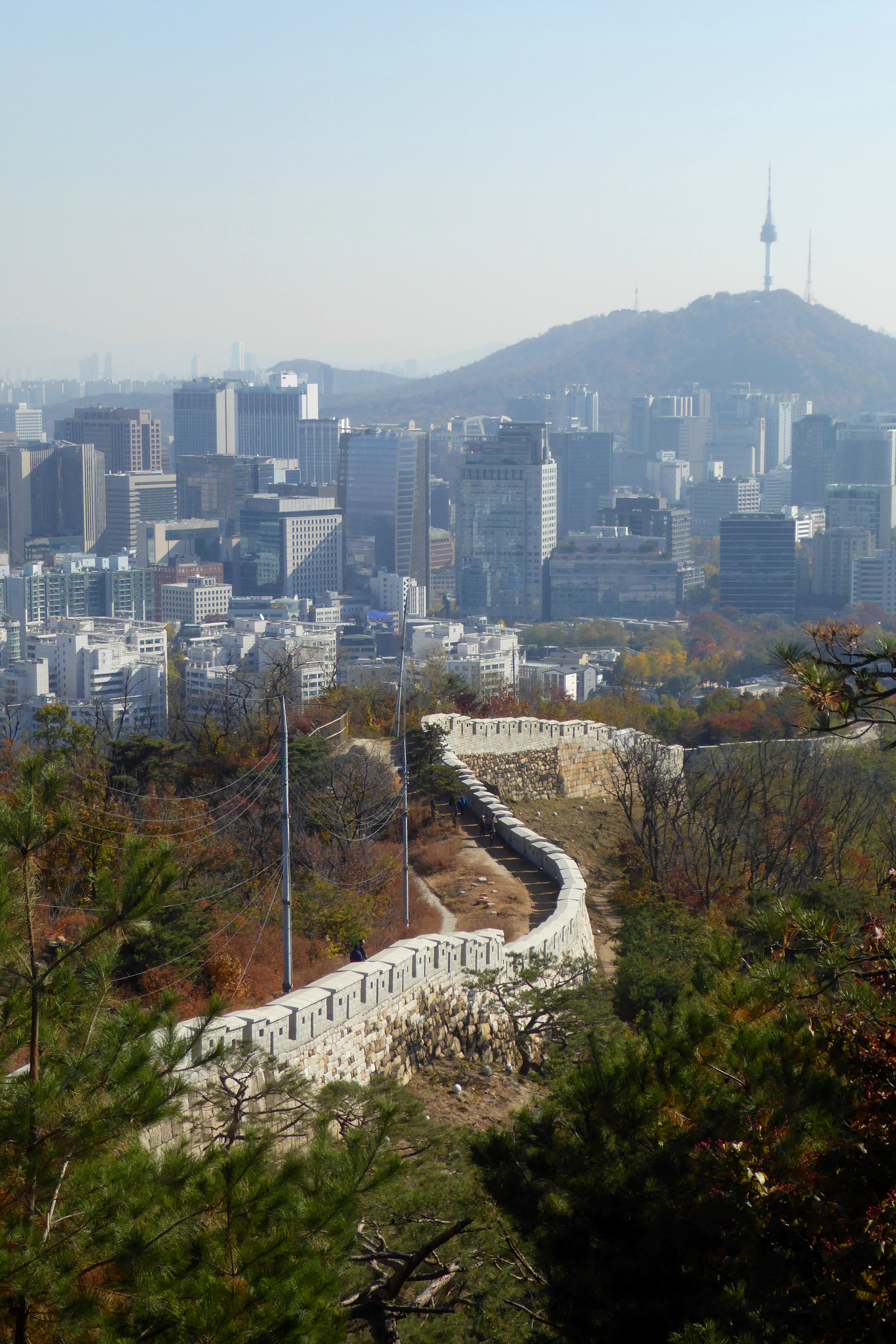
View of the Downtown Seoul and N Seoul Tower behind the Seoul City Wall

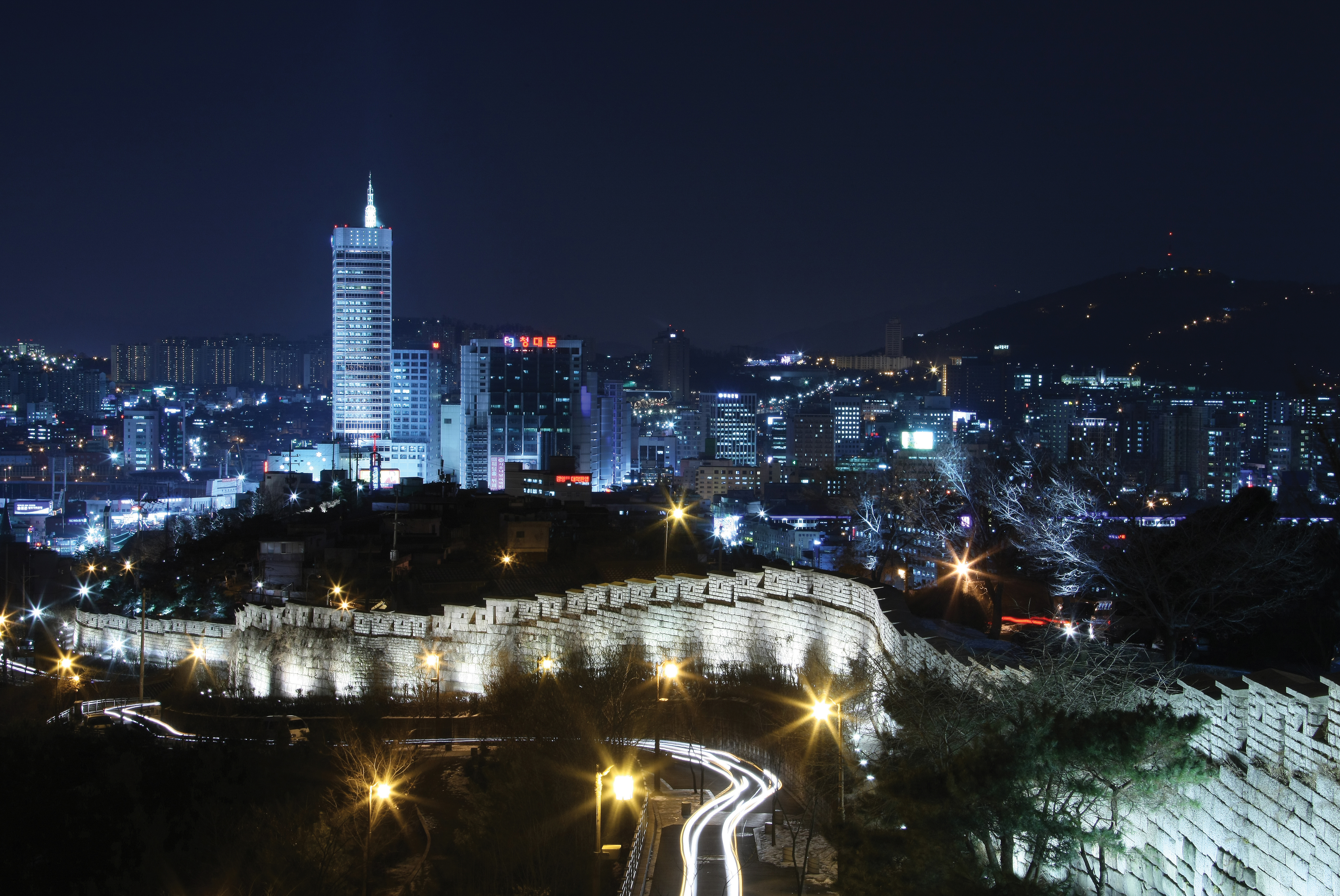
A night view from Naksan Mountain

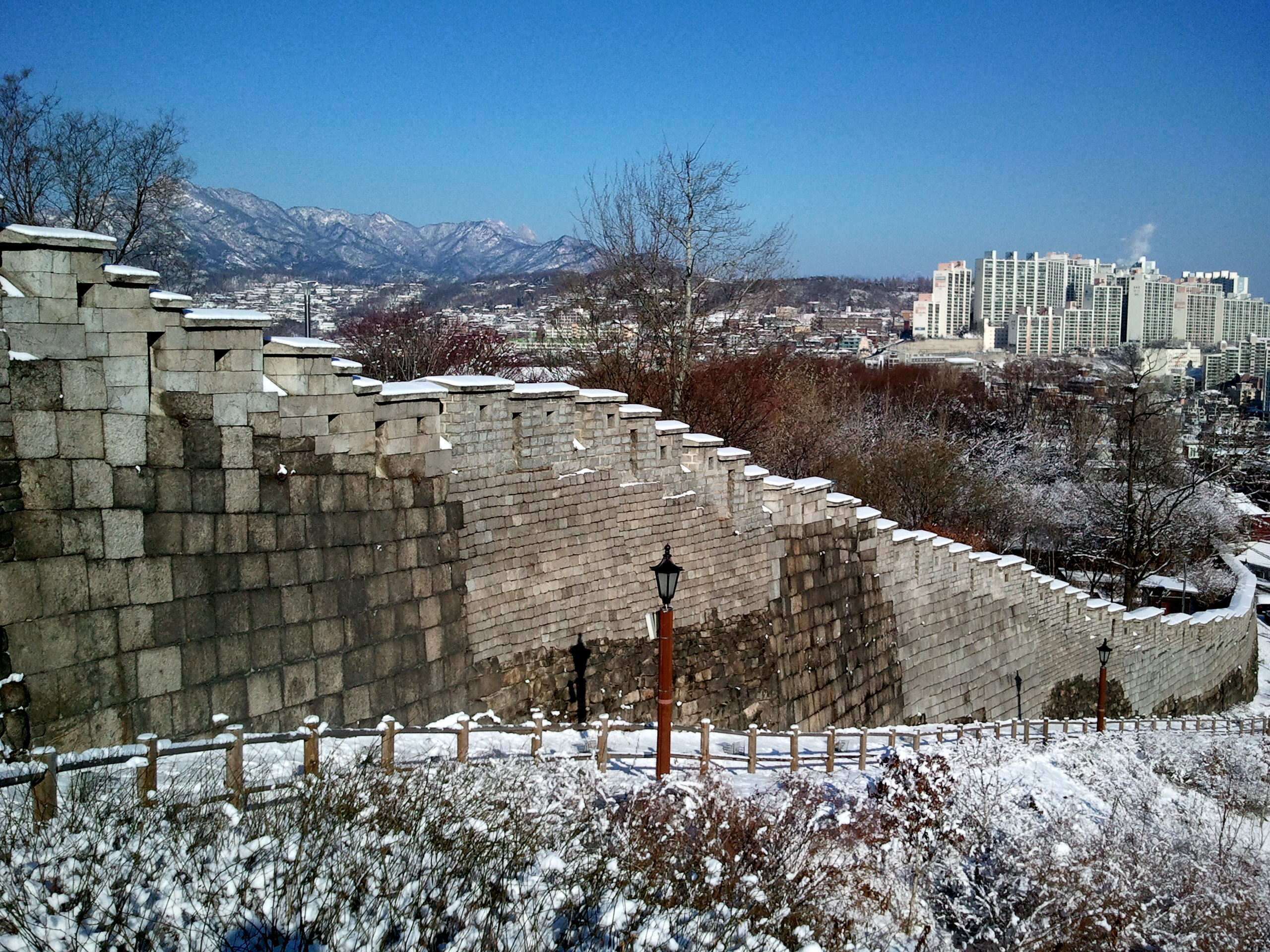
A snowy view of Fortress Wall of Seoul

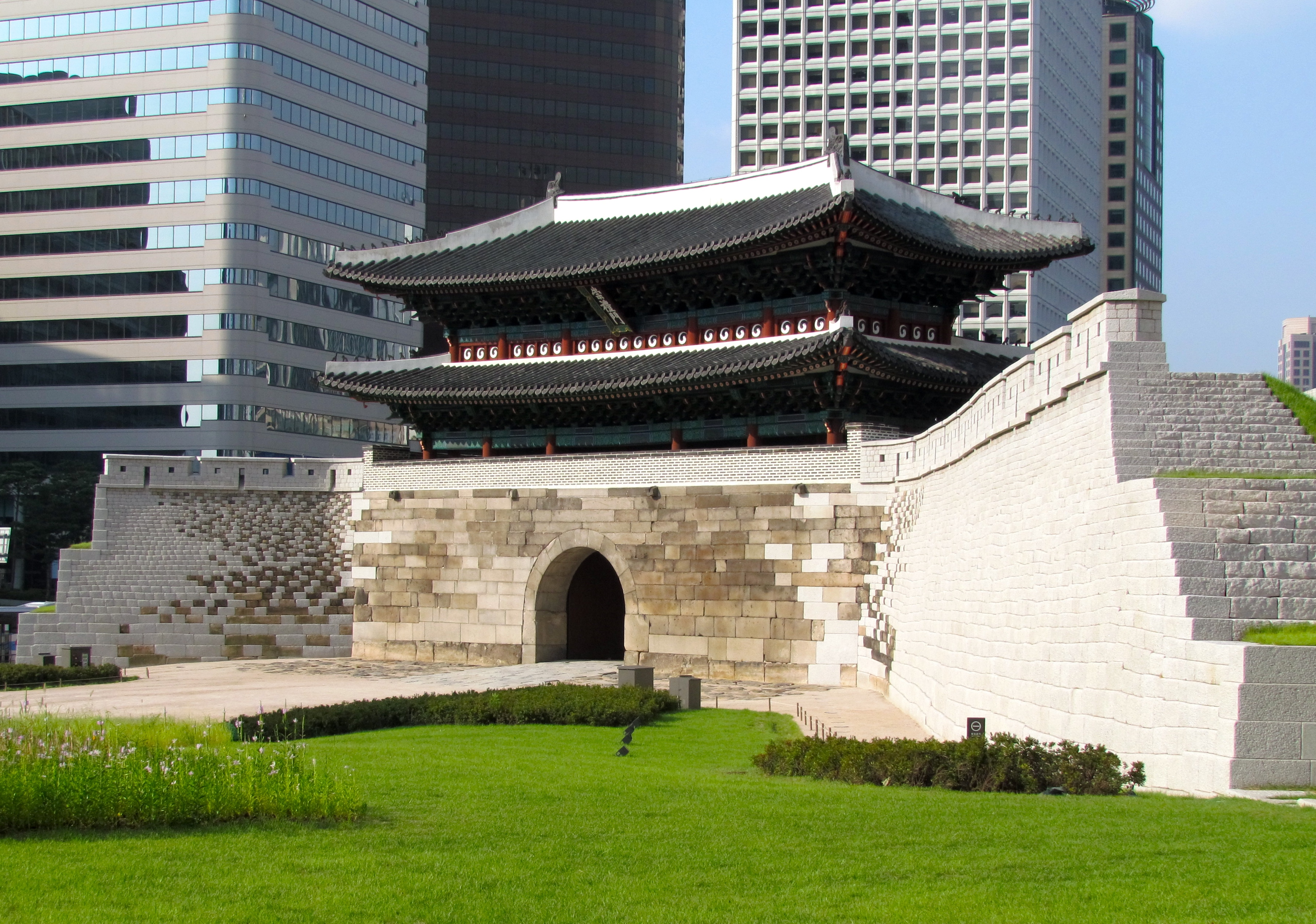
Sungnyemun Gate, Seoul

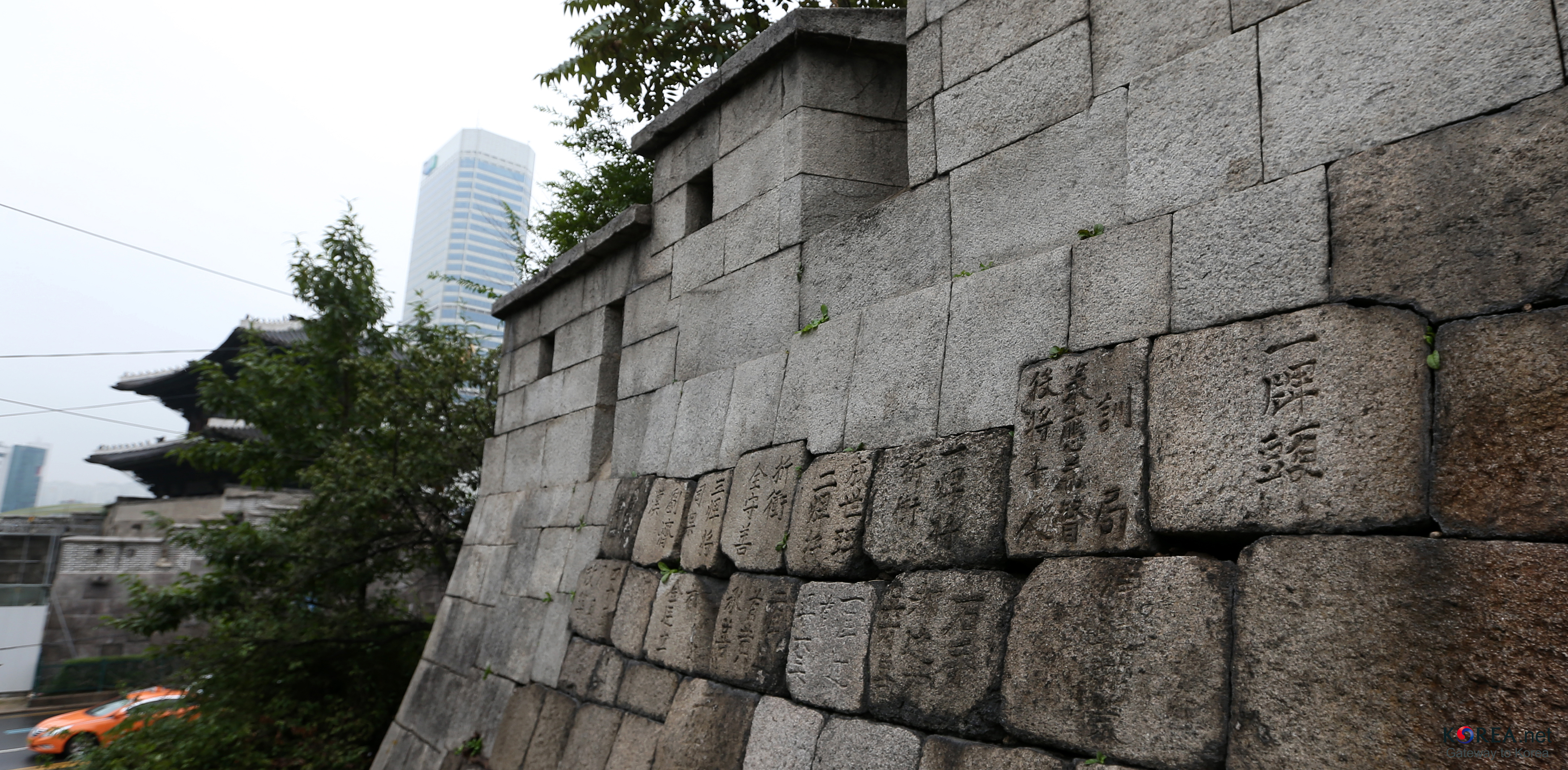
Hanyangdoseong, which shows restoration efforts made by the Seoul government

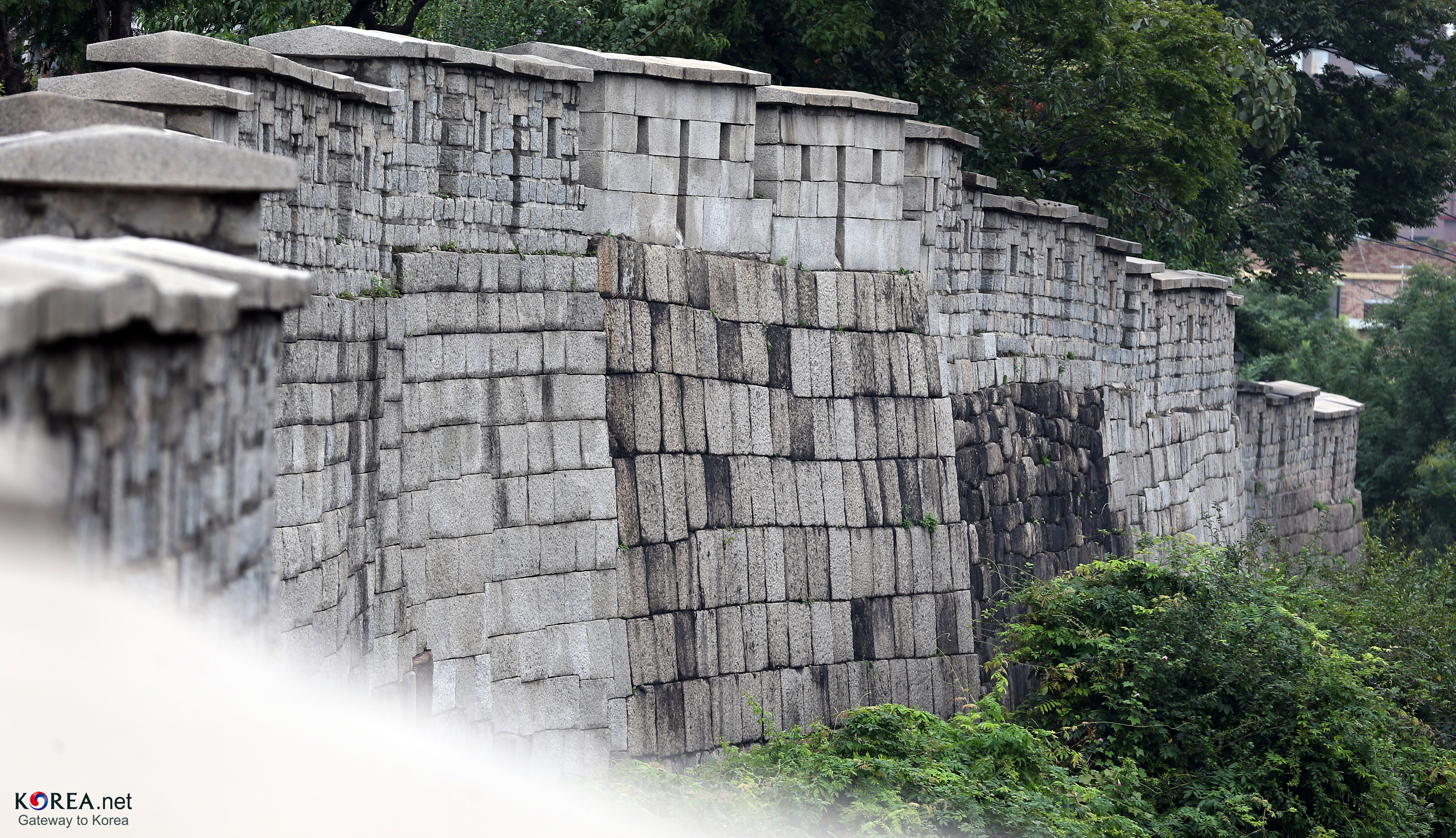
Hanyangdoseong at Seoul City Wall Park and Naksan Park, Seoul

== See also ==
- The Eight Gates of Seoul
- Downtown Seoul
- Seongjeosimni
- Seoul City Wall Museum
