= Finger pinching conspiracy theory =

Conspiracy theory in South Korea

According to the conspiracy theory, a finger pinching gesture ("pinching hand" emoji (Note: U+1F90F 🤏 PINCHING HAND) pictured) is deliberately used by media to humiliate men with small penises.

The finger pinching conspiracy theory (Note: Korean: 집게손가락 음모론. Coined by a series of articles published between December 2023 and January 2024 by Kyunghyang Shinmun, in reaction to Nexon endorsing the theory when its video game, MapleStory, was accused of hiding finger pinching images in its promotional trailers.) is an antifeminist conspiracy theory that originated in South Korea. It claims that there is a deliberate plot to spread and promote misandry through symbolic hand gestures, and that radical feminist groups have propagated these hidden messages to humiliate men with small penises.

The conspiracy theory first gained prominence in May 2021 when convenience store chain GS25 published an advertisement with a hand gesture, which faced accusations of allegedly disparaging penises and aggrandizing the defunct fringe feminist group Megalia. The company retracted it and issued an apology. Since then, numerous organizations were met with similar protests from theorists and announced apologies.

Despite contradictory claims and a general lack of evidence, the theory persists; notably in the video game industry, where Nexon led a public allegation against its collaborators. It is viewed as an online harassment tactic employed by antifeminist backlash movements. The theory has been a source of misinformation circulated by internet-based communities and news media.

== Claims ==
In June 2024, finger pinching conspiracy theorists accused Nexon of misandry as a woman's hand clasping in MapleStory illustration (left) was deemed to taunt their penis size. The company updated the image with the hands altered (right).

According to authors who consider it false, the finger pinching conspiracy theory is based on a belief among South Korean men that feminists are planning covertly to worsen their lives or harm them. The conspiracy theory argues numerous entities have started to plant a specific hand gesture, commonly referred to as the "finger pinching" gesture, (Note: Alternative translation includes "crab hand".) with an index finger and thumb facing each other. The hand gesture belongs to a family of handshape known as "precision grip gestures" that involve prehensile motions that depict holding small objects. The conspiracy theory claims this hand gesture, discovered in various South Korean media, is implicitly signaling Korean men's penises are small. The hand gesture is also reminiscent of the website logo of Megalia, a defunct radical feminist movement website. The conspiracy theory claims this is an intentional reference.

Proponents of the conspiracy theory usually claim that radical feminists were successful in infiltrating various organizations. The conspiracy theorists assume a feminist deep state controls the Korean government, especially the Ministry of Gender Equality and Family, which they claim is an independent agency that implements policies favoring women and encourages misandry. The finger pinching incidents are cited as a proof to this argument.

The place where the finger pinching is spotted as well as the extent to which they can be considered offensive varies between cases. Incidents included theorists associating the finger-pinching symbolism with depiction of hands pointing at mundane items, such as a credit card, a can of Starbucks espresso, or a COVID-19 vaccine. One anonymous conspiracy theorist argued they could differentiate the problematic finger pinching gesture from ordinary hand gesture, because they thought the former contained explicit intentions.

== History ==
=== Background ===
South Korea in the 2020s has been described as having gender inequality in a number of aspects. Multiple authors noted the country has a gender pay gap among the widest in the OECD. In 2021, women made up only 5.2 percent of the board members of publicly listed businesses, compared with 28 percent in the United States. In a 2021 report, World Economic Forum ranked South Korea as 102nd in gender parity. To curb this trend, the Korean government rolled out programs to bring more women into the workforce.

The country is also known for severe gender conflicts. A 2021 survey by the Ministry of Gender Equality and Family found that among the age range of 19 to 34 years, 74.6% of women and 51.7% of men both felt discriminated against in South Korean societies. Around 2020, South Korea saw a rise in feminist campaigns by women, including MeToo movement, the abolition of abortion law, and the claim to short haircuts. Since the 2020s, there has also been an increase in antifeminist Korean men who argue they are victims of reverse discrimination. Reasons given for this belief include: the compulsory military service exclusive to men; dwindling job opportunities; and refusal to take responsibility for the toxic masculinity of older generations. These factors made the men assume they are falling behind their female peers. This phenomenon reportedly led to street rallies organized by antifeminist movement communities, such as men's-rights group New Men's Solidarity. One rally participant argued "[this movement is] about fair competition." In addition, the gender war sparked interest from politics, making attempts at representing these antifeminist men.

In 2015, a radical feminist movement website named Megalia was founded. The website focused on antagonizing men. It became infamous for its logo that depicted an obscene hand gesture, with an index finger and thumb in a pinching motion; this was intended to mock alleged small penises. Megalia shut down in 2017, although criticism of the group and its symbolism has reportedly persisted.

=== Origin and spread ===
On May 1, 2021, GS25's local retail firm GS Retail sent a digital notice letter to its customers via mobile messaging app KakaoTalk, announcing future promotional events in that month. The message contained a poster for camping-related items, which had a pictogram of hands grabbing a sausage. That same day, a rumor emerged that the picture was an intentional reference to the Megalia logo. There is disagreement on the origin of the rumor. News outlets reported it first appeared on a website called Ppomppu at 10:15, while scholars claimed it started in other website, FM Korea. Regardless, the rumor reached other communities quickly. GS25 responded to the incident before 13:00.

GS25 reacted by issuing apology letters and altering the poster twice that day. Each alteration was reportedly met with more allegations of radical feminist symbolism. Many other elements in the poster were accused of promoting radical feminism or disparaging men's penises. These accusations include: the crescent being the logo of a feminist club in universities, its tagline having an acronym of Megalia's name, the tent resembling a penis, and the campfire resembling a sperm cell. These claims were dismissed by news media as a falsehood. For example, the claim that the pinching hand stands for tiny penises was considered unfounded because the gesture has common and universal use for small objects. In other instance, conspiracy theorists claimed GS25 added the crescent in the poster's second iteration, suggesting it was a new hidden message planted by Megalia user. This argument was debunked because the object was already present in the advertisement's first iteration, only cropped out in certain versions. After going through multiple revisions, GS25 removed the poster altogether and issued another apology on social media on May 2.

Protests continued after GS25's announcement. On May 2, a petition on National Petition to the Blue House was launched to remove the GS25 business chain from the Korea Armed Forces; it received 42 thousand signatures in a day. A boycott movement spread, with supporters comparing it to the 2019 boycott of Japanese products. One GS25-affiliated store owner put up a signboard that supported "equality of outcome and opportunity" and denounced feminism. Members of the New Men's Solidarity protested outside the company's headquarters.

The integrity behind the online backlash was questioned by GS25 officials and third parties. Food industry retailers rejected the accusation and expressed that such incidents would demoralize their business. A person claiming to be the GS25 graphic designer contested the controversy on Blind. In a now-deleted statement, she said she does not support any ideology and her design did not intend hatred for men. Nevertheless, GS25 announced on May 31 that the graphic designer would be disciplined. GS Retail president was relocated to only serving offline business department although GS25 claimed this decision is unrelated to the finger pinching incident. The GS25 incident is commonly referred to as the first publicized case of controversies surrounding the finger pinching.

=== MapleStory scandal ===
On November 25, 2023, Nexon's video game MapleStory published a trailer, promoting the remastered character class Angelic Buster. A rumor was spread shorly afterward, claiming there was a display of misandry in the trailer, with a character allegedly performing the finger pinching gesture for 0.1 seconds. Finger pinching conspiracy theorists searched for similar gestures in other Nexon trailers, including Dungeon Fighter Online and Blue Archive. The conspiracy theorists scrutinized Ppuri, the animation production studio of the animated trailers. Ppuri had been working with Nexon since 2017, producing numerous trailers for the Nexon video games.

Nexon removed the MapleStory trailer on November 26. The company also reportedly contacted Ppuri on that day and suggested it issue an apology. Accordingly, Ppuri posted its first apology letter at 16:12. The letter stated Ppuri did not depict the finger pinching gesture on purpose, and the company would send Nexon a list of animation frames by the staff that drew the finger pinching gesture. Three hours later at 19:00, MapleStory director Kim Chang-seop announced Nexon would remove all visual works created by Ppuri and condemned the animation studio in a YouTube livestream. Kim said he was against people who implicitly express hatred, and promised Nexon would pursue legal actions against Ppuri. Dungeon Fighter Online director Lee Wonman and Blue Archive director Kim Yongha expressed similar sentiments on the matter. Ppuri's works for those games were removed as well.

Nexon's response was followed by substantial backlashes from finger pinching theorists against Ppuri. A female Ppuri animator was doxed; her social media posts were analyzed and alleged to be confirmation of planting misandrist symbolism. She also received death threats and rape threats. Users of Namuwiki, a wiki website, compiled alleged incidents on a "misandry controversy" article. Ppuri president Jang Seonyeong issued a second apology letter on November 27 in which she promised to fire the animator; this was due to pressure from the theorists and their business relationship with Nexon, which composed 80 percent of their work at the time. This public apology was taken down on the same day. Ppuri later overturned the decision of removing the employee from her position. Jang and Ppuri director Kim Sangjin said that it was unjust to admit to a misdeed the studio has never done, and the director wanted to protect its animators from online harassment.

Nexon's public reprimand of Ppuri was positively received by its associated developers. Nexon union leader Bae Suchan likened the fingers to the English racial slur nigger, saying an expression must be redacted if it can be read as hate speech. When its umbrella organization, the Korean Confederation of Trade Unions (KCTU), joined the press conference in front of Nexon's headquarters to condemn Nexon's action, Bae Suchan said they would consider leaving the KCTU because it focused more on political activities than efforts to protect the rights of its members. Supercat, the developer behind mobile game The Kingdom of the Winds published by Nexon, started in-house training that taught its workers not to express feminism in the game and included Ppuri animator's tweet as an example. On Blind, anonymous Nexon employee criticized Ppuri for putting the burden to fix the game on Nexon developers.

Later investigations performed by news media and Ppuri's interviews, which involved cross-examining storyboards and key frames, found that the allegations led by Nexon and the finger pinching theorists were erroneous. Worksheets provided by Ppuri revealed that the "feminist hand gesture" scene in the Angelic Buster trailer was not drawn by the female employee, but a male animator in his forties. Ppuri disputed Nexon's argument that the studio hid the fingers without its knowledge. Ppuri directors claimed Nexon had supervised the trailers eight times over the course of a month, and did not take issues with the Angelic Buster's hand gesture scene prior to the release. A similar claim about Ppuri's trailer for Dungeon Fighter Online was also contested. The directors explained that, contrary to the conspiracy theories, a character in the trailer was opening her hand instead of making a finger pinching gesture.

Other rumors from conspiracy theorists were likewise challenged, including: that a tweet by Ppuri animator hinted at hiding the fingers (the tweet is unrelated to radical feminist conspiracies, made back in March 2022 as a sarcastic response to an internet rumor that degraded feminism); that Ppuri had voided its offices and ghosted its clients (it never did, although a number of employees were temporarily relocated to other places in light of threatening phone calls and unidentified visitors taking photos of the main office); and that Ppuri had performed similar practice on a promotional video of Street Fighter 6 (the company did not work on said animatics).

Nexon has eluded subsequent contacts from Ppuri afterwards. The company faced additional complaints from Nexon players after the scandal, who insisted there were more pinching fingers in MapleStory. Each was resolved with Nexon removing the fingers.

Ppuri sought to pursue legal actions against internet trolls who harassed its employees. Ppuri's press conference in December 2023 mentioned it had collected over thousands of internet posts of cyberbullying against the company and its animators; 308 posts were eventually chosen to press charges through the Seocho District police between May and June 2024. The police initially dismissed Ppuri's charges on July 24, 2024, on the basis that it is logical for defendants to criticize Ppuri animators for allying with feminists. It re-opened the case two days later, after its decision was met with public condemnation and a request for reinvestigation from the Prosecutors' Office. The police finished the re-investigation in February 2025 against the 86 specified defendants, some of which were informed for multiple offenses, including defamation and cyberstalking. The Ppuri animator and plaintiff appealed in April against those who were not informed, saying that the police did not explain properly on why they were acquitted.

== List of notable responses ==
Date of response	Entity	Details
May 1, 2021	GS25	See § Origin and spread
May 2, 2021	National Police Agency	In light of the GS25 controversies, a promotional flyer of the Road Traffic Act posted by Seoul Metropolitan Police Agency and Gyeonggi Bukbu Provincial Police Agency was met with decry from theorists. The flyer contained a hand pointing to its phrase. The police explained in a subsequent announcement that the hand is to emphasize the news and, to avoid confusion, promised it would withdraw the flyers and replace them.
May 7, 2021	Genesis BBQ	Genesis BBQ received condemnation from theorists for featuring a pinch finger in its advertising poster, where a hand picked up a sausage with its fingers. The company apologized and suspended distribution of the poster.
May 7, 2021	Kyochon	Kyochon's fried chicken advertisement came under scrutiny when its social media posts featured an image that depicted two fingers grabbing its product, which was found by theorists offensive due to resembling the pinch finger. Kyochon denied any intention of misandry, but removed the image nonetheless.
May 3, 2021	Musinsa	On April 26, 2021, Musinsa commenced a collaborative event with Hyundai Card and posted a promotional flyer in which both hands were grasping a wallet and a credit card. This caused a turmoil in male-centric internet forums, which found the flyer similar to "Megalia hands." Musinsa initially published an announcement on May 3 that the flyer is meant to symbolize barter. This wasn't the first time Musinsa was accused of misandry, as the company issued coupons for female customers in March 2021, only for it to cancel them when the promotion was criticized for being a "reverse discrimination" against men, with its president Cho Manho giving an apology on social media. On June 3, Cho Manho announced he would step down from president, taking full responsibility of aforementioned two incidents.
May 3, 2021	Emart	Emart24 announced a promotional event to win a prize on May 1, 2021, and posted a related poster. The poster, where a man was shown pointing to stars with his hand, was met with uproar from the theorists due to resembling pinch finger, spurring Emart to remove the hand two days later.
May 17, 2021	Pyeongtaek	In May 2021, the Pyeongtaek city hall received online protest when it distributed a poster for competition, which included an image of a group of people, one of which was found offensive by the finger pinching theorists due to having a hand gesture similar to "misandry fingers." The poster was created by the same company that made the one for GS25. A city hall official apologized for upsetting the theorists, promsing to discard the existing copies. This led to having to reprint approximately 32 banners, 200 posters, and 4,000 flyers. They cost ₩2,800,000 altogether. In August 2021, the Pyeongtaek city hall was condemned by theorists again when it shared a guide on social media about how to prepare for heat waves in the area, which included an illustration of a farmer wiping his sweat with a hand gesture that allegedly looked like a pinch finger. The city hall reacted by removing the guide.
May 17, 2021	MMTG	On May 13, 2021, Jaejae, the producer of SBS program MMTG, participated in the Baeksang Arts Awards and ate a chocolate bar on red carpet as impromptu performance, which was publicly broadcast on television. Finger pinching theorists took issues with her action, as picking up the chocolate bar with fingers was seen as an act of misandry. The production team behind MMTG denied the rumor and suggested to stop spreading controversies without proofs. A petition on the Blue House website was launched to ban Jaejae from appearing on television. More than 91,000 people had signed on it. Jaejae later described her experience at the time to have been stressful.
May 25, 2021	Rankingdak	A wrapping paper manufactured by Rankingdak caused controversies for featuring a hand pointing at taglines, which looked like the finger pinching to theorists. The company apologized and promised to change the design.
May 27, 2021	KakaoBank	KakaoBank apologized for implying misandry with its promotional material, which had a woman pointing at her cellphone.
May 27, 2021	Ministry of National Defense	On May 22 and 26, Ministry of National Defense uploaded announcements about its welfare system on its social media, which contained images of soldiers doing a salute. This was considered a controversial move by theorists, as the images had what is perceived as pinch fingers. Its spokesperson Bu Seungchan publicly apologized for causing a "certain misunderstanding and controversy." The ministry removed all of the images on June 9.
June 7, 2021	War Memorial of Korea	On June 6, 2021, theorists protested against the War Memorial of Korea through its website board, claiming one of its facilities is featuring a finger pinching gesture on its dedicated photo spot. Theorists argued that a Megalia user has assimilated the organization to present the pinch finger gesture and must be relieved from their position, despite the fact that said work was on display since 2013, predating Megalia's establishment in 2015. Nevertheless, an official apologized to the theorists on the next day and removed the work.
July 25, 2021	Starbucks	Starbucks RTD published an advertisement on Instagram about an upcoming summer event, in which there was a shadow of a hand grabbing its product. This drew uproar from internet forums that considered it too similar to a finger pinching gesture. Starbucks RTD pulled the ad later that day and issued an apology.
August 6, 2021	Ministry of the Interior and Safety	A poster distributed by the Ministry of the Interior and Safety drew ire from theorists in August 2021 as it featured an image of a man shutting a window, whose pose was claimed to promote misandry.The ministry apologized for causing misandry controversy and removed the image. Theorists rallied another campaign on October 26 for a different poster; the ministry acknowledged the accusation the next day and apologized as well.
August 26, 2021	Smilegate	Smilegate's MMORPG Lost Ark received accusations of featuring the offensive hand gesture. One of its avatar icons was an "OK sign," with an index finger nearly touching a thumb, which some of Lost Ark began claiming was a sexist insult against men. This icon has been in the game since March 2018, but the publisher quickly complied with the demands for removal, promising to policy "game-unrelated controversies" in their products. In November 2023, in light of Nexon's public condemnations of Studio Ppuri's animatic works, Smilegate's Epic Seven faced an accusation that its promotional trailer, also worked by Ppuri, contained pinch fingers. The game's director Kim Yunha announced in the following statement that he's ordered to take down related promotional videos and conduct a thorough investigation.
July 19, 2022	Line	Line was accused of promoting misandry by theorists because, when they typed "small" in its text prompt, the software recommended the finger pinching emoji via autocorrection. The Line development team denied the accusations.
November 26, 2023	Nexon	See § MapleStory scandal
November 26, 2023	Kakao Games	Kakao Games announced that Eternal Return has removed its opening animation produced by Ppuri following the MapleStory scandal.
November 28, 2023	Posco	In August 2023, Posco uploaded an animated employee recruitment video on its official YouTube channel. The video received attention from the theorists for featuring multiple incidents of finger pinching gesture. Posco took down the video that day without any statement.
December 7, 2023	Ministry of Health and Welfare	The Ministry of Health and Welfare distributed a poster for the 2023 Medical Scientist Conference, which caused uproar from theorists as it featured an image of a woman pointing a finger and therefore implies misandry. The ministry stated that the image was created by a British company on April 24, 2021, and therefore had nothing to do with the finger pinching, but it nonetheless replaced the poster with a new one.
June 30, 2024	Renault	Renault Korea Motors, the Korean unit of French auto group, revealed showcase videos on its corporate YouTube channel. The videos were accused by theorists as implying misandry, as they allegedly featured multiple incidents of a female employee doing a finger pinching hand gesture. Renault Korea blocked public access to the videos on June 30 and wrote it sincerely apologize to everyone who felt discomfort due to its recent internal promotional content. The female employee in the video issued an apology on June 29 on the YouTube channel's community, saying she was aware that a certain hand gesture was problematic, but didn't know her presentation in the video could be interpreted that way. She added that she didn't do it on purpose, and asked the protesters to stop name-calling her. The apology was shortly deleted that day. There were reportedly internal complaints against Renault's handling of the incident and the employee herself; the company later claimed it had issued a suspension on her. The Korea Herald reported that Renault mishandled apology because it underestimated the gravity of the issue. The employee was subject to online harassment shortly afterwards, with doxing and death threats against her reported. A car-related YouTube channel left comments condemning Renault and called for the employee's punishment. The YouTuber later received complaints from theorists for using video thumbnails with him holding his glasses, which resembled the finger pinching gesture. Renault Korea president Stephane Deblaise announced on July 3 that the company acknowledged the situation and would open a personnel committee with experts to discuss it.
July 1, 2024	Volvo Cars	A Korean Volvo employee posted on Blind that there is a display of pinching fingers in Volvo posters from June 2024. They were presented by theorists as proof of feminists "ruining the automotive industry". Volvo Korea removed the posters that day.
July 6, 2024	Binggrae	Binggrae was running an advertising campaign featuring Binggraeus, a brand character based on its corporate image. The company pulled the original promotion off in December 2023, and later replaced it with a new character design that depicts Binggraeus' hands as flat circles. This change was interpreted by news media as a corporate decision to conform to the theorists.
July 15, 2024	Hyundai Heavy Industries union	The union of Hyundai Heavy Industries published an article in its newsletter, which condemned its company's alleged use of finger-pinching on its outdoor signage. The newsletter claimed that feminists were suffering from "mental leprosy" and must be locked up in asylum.
August 21, 2024	Ministry of Employment and Labor	On August 2, 2024, the Ministry of Labor and Employment released public materials that detailed safety hazards and warned fatal fall. The ministry received complaints over the safety infographic for the worker's hand resembling the finger pinching, and announced that the image was revised.
August 23, 2024	Korean Red Cross	A poster created by Korean Red Cross' Gyeongnam branch drew controversies from theorists, who argued that a female soldier's salute resembled the finger pinching and evoked misandry. After protests through Anti-corruption and Civil Rights Commission website, Red Cross official announced that the organization scrapped the prints, and apologized for images that could cause misunderstanding.
August 30, 2024	Gwangju Nambu Police Station	On August 27, 2024, the Gwangju police station created a poster for prevention of deepfake sexual crime, and distributed it to schools within the city. It caused outrage for what is perceived by theorists as the finger pinching hands in the image. The police announced an official statement that the poster was withdrawn and would be replaced with a new one.
September 6, 2024	Seoul Milk	Dairy cooperative Seoul Milk started a promotional event on September 3, 2024, looking for potential influencers to recruit for its product marketing. One of the guidelines in the notice was to "avoid a hand gesture that can cause controversies when you grab products or open yogurt", which meant the "misandrist hand gesture", as later confirmed by Seoul Milk official. The event became controversial on social media for allegedly appeasing the finger pinching theorists. Seoul Milk revised the notice to remove the line.
October 10, 2024	Hyundai Motor Company	In 2023, Hyundai has uploaded a series of videos named Electric Car How-TO, providing guides for the company's all-electric vehicle models. Later in 2024, theorists alleged that one video featured the finger pinching gesture and promoted misandry. Hyundai took down all of Electric Car How-TO videos and apologized with an announcement that the company would tighten up self-censorship on its contents.
September 9, 2025	Apple Inc.	In 2025, Apple unveiled its new models of iPhone lineup, including the iPhone Air. A promotional image featured a hand holding the iPhone Air to emphasize its thinness. In the South Korean version, the hand was removed, with just the device shown. The change was speculated to be due to antifeminist backlashes.
October 25, 2025	Shift Up	In August 2025, video game company Shift Up was accused of bigotry by Goddess of Victory: Nikke players, who disputed that the game's commemorative painting featured two characters allegedly performing hand gestures identical to the finger pinching, which they found was misandrist. The company updated the art to alter their hands. Later on October 25, Nikke director Hyungsuk Yoo addressed this change in a livestream and said, "We will never tolerate anyone intentionally inserting hate speech into Nikke," and that the developer's internal review process had been augmented to prevent similar issues.
March 21, 2026	Republic of Korea Army	The South Korean Army published a poster for recruiting officer candidate school personnels on March 18, and demoilished it three days later after receiving complaints that a woman in the poster, doing a pose similar to the finger pinching gesture, mocked male genitals.
June 1, 2026	LG Electronics	LG Electronics published a YouTube Shorts video about Korean household's unpaid work and its relation to gross domestic product. It was accused by conspiracy theorists of showing the finger pinching gesture and promoting feminism. The video was taken down, but no official statement was given for the removal. Conspiracy theorists demanded apology and discipline for responsible employees.

== Discourse ==
The finger pinching conspiracy theory is widely agreed to be a hoax. (Note: Attributed to multiple references:) Numerous authors argued that no robust evidence suggests that radical feminist groups are planting the gesture to promote misandry. Others argue that the structure of the human hand results in the gesture being unintentionally formed many times a day. Some analysts have argued that isolating single frames from animation is meaningless, as animations exist in motion.

News media identified the finger pinching conspiracy theory as an online antifeminist movement in South Korea. Kyunghyang Shinmun claimed that the finger pinching theory is not an isolated incident, but a part of the ongoing antifeminist backlash movement on the South Korean internet since at least 2009. The Hankyoreh listed nine other similar antifeminist backlashes that occurred in 2021. Sisain wrote the movement is driven by Korean men's belief that they are discriminated by cultural censorship based on women's thought, and that they must repay it with their own censorship.

The conspiracy theory is regarded as a form of gender-based violence. Yang Souhee, Waseda University assistant professor, cited the GS25 incident and the MapleStory scandel as examples of South Korea's patriarchy intensifying the gender-based violence. She mentioned these cases with the Nth Room criminal case, all of which she claimed were heavily influenced by the misogynistic and victim-blaming culture in the country. Yang concluded the gender-based violence must be prevented through both legal and non-legal measures, because criminal law's effectiveness can be undermined by the inadequacies of the patriarchal society. BBC likewise compared the conspiracy theory to other antifeminist violence in the country, such as when a woman was physically assaulted by a man in November 2023 because he thought she was a feminist for having short hair.

=== Internet trolling ===
Critics of the finger pinching theory have focused on the impact of online communities, addressing their role in spreading rumors and encouraging online harassment against victims. Numerous authors have argued that a considerable number of theorists are exposed to male-dominated internet forums and social media. A 2021 The Hankyoreh report found that the accusations against GS25 in May 2021 came from and were subsequently spread by male-focused websites, including DC Inside, MLBpark, FM Korea, and Ruliweb. Based on its research, The Hankyoreh suggested these websites were pivotal to the backlash pattern. Other websites that some argued influenced the theorists include Namuwiki and Arcalive.

The male-dominated online communities were recognised as the driving force to spread the conspiracy theories and vilify feminist movements. Gu Jihye, Kookmin University professor, collected internet posts about the GS25 incident from one of these online communities, and analyzed how its users treated feminist agenda. Gu found that, despite the online community being identified as generally progressive in the political spectrum, the users shared misogynist discourse that affirmed the GS25 conspiracy theories, regarding feminists as a threat to the South Korean society. Gu claimed that the community propagated a "us versus them" narrative, describing feminism as antisocial agenda incompatible to the progressive politics. Gu found the online forum achieved this by equating marginalized radical feminist groups like Megalia to general feminist movement, blaming the latter for the former. Writing for Hankook Ilbo, Lee Hyemi likewise argued the online communities misled their users by exaggerating the presence of now-defunct Megalia even though it was short-lived and, at its prime, didn't have nearly as many members as other active websites like Ilbe Storehouse and FM Korea. The Hankyoreh's research reported the users of male-dominated online communities posted about accusing organizations of radical feminism and discussing how to protest against them.

The finger pinching theory was debated as a medium of justifying harassment against women. The Korea Herald cited Jammi, a livestreamer accused of being a radical feminist after she used a pinching hand sign, as an example of growing anti-feminist expectations placed on female celebrities. Jammi later committed suicide after online accusations of her being misandrist, with her news coverage mentioning the finger pinching incident. Seoul Shinmun regarded the finger pinching theory as a tool of "hatred framing", taking certain keywords out of context and misrepresenting them to incriminate the speaker. Yang Souhee proposed that these accusations are motivated by the desire to control women, deter them from embracing feminism, and solidify male power within society.

Other authors regarded the conspiracy theory as a means for antifeminists to play the victim. Kim Jinsook, Emory University assistant professor, claimed antifeminists had borrowed strategies that called out sexism and misogyny and re-branded them as a consumer movement, intended to criticize feminism and drive feminists from public spaces. Kim said these dominant antifeminist groups, already exercising power within the society, co-opted cancel culture, disguising their behaviors as campaigns based on moral outrage. Lucien Brown, an associate professor in Korean studies, argued that the male-dominated communities abused the act of "taking offence" to garner sympathy from major corporations, government bodies and the right-wing media. Accordingly, this allowed them to become the victims of misandry, while feminists were positioned as female chauvinists.

Some commentators compared the theorists to supporters of other conspiracy theories. Semyung University professor Sim Seoktae compared the theorists to flat Earthers. Hankook Ilbo journalist In Hyeonu compared the theorists to Gamergate, which involved similar cherrypicking of information and harassment. In also compared the movement to Trumpism because of perceived neotribalism. Seoul National University professor Kim Sua suggested a counter-information campaign and to pass an anti-discrimination law. Other authors compared the finger pinching theorists to incels.

Other presses argued the theory has had a negative effect on creative works. The Chosun Ilbo reported that the finger pinching controversies, with the other internet disputes, have cost extra resources for companies to alter their commercial advertisements and avoid potential complaints. Webtoon, an American-Korean webcomic platform owned by Naver, became a subject of constant disputes for the company's policies over the fingers. Webtoon comics like Return of the Blossoming Blade and Omniscient Reader's Viewpoint were criticized for censoring the alleged depiction of finger pinching hand gestures, with opponents of the conspiracy theory describing Naver's actions as inconsistent censorship and misogynic.

The conspiracy theory was noted for being a subject of doxing and cyberbullying. JoongAng Ilbo reported that this kind of "online lynch" must be regulated with law and punishment.

=== Reactions of news media ===
Numerous authors cited news industry as a major contributor to spreading the conspiracy theory. Noh Jimin, of Media Today, criticized news outlets that she felt did not critically analyze the truthfulness of the GS25 and MapleStory incidents. Seoul University associate professor Kim Sooah claimed that Korean news media unconditionally published articles based on rumors about Megalia. Kim argued that these news articles created an illusion that there is a conspiracy to surreptitiously encourage misandry in South Korean society, and pressured organizations into avoiding being labelled misandrist regardless of whether such accusations were true.

Some authors held certain news outlets more responsible than the others. Lucien Brown wrote that conservative sources (e.g. JoongAng Ilbo, The Chosun Ilbo, and The Dong-A Ilbo) justified the conspiracy theorists' claims of intentionality, often publishing interpretations and quotations directly lifted from male-dominated online communities. By contrast, progressive and moderate sources (Kyunghyang Shinmun, The Hankyoreh, OhmyNews, and Hankook Ilbo) questioned the logic to such convoluted interpretation. Citizens' Coalition for Democratic Media reported similar issues, citing the articles from The Chosun Ilbo, Money Today, and The Korea Economic Daily as examples of publicizing unfounded rumors from online communities without verifying their authenticity.

There are disputes between news media over whether South Korean organizations that appeased the theorists were also responsible for enabling their behavior. Brown found that the conservative sources view the corporations involved as victims of the gender conflict, while the progressive sources were critical of them. Authors who found the organizations complicit argued that such appeasement reinforced the confirmatory bias of the theorists, and infringed on people's rights to labor and expression.

=== Politics ===
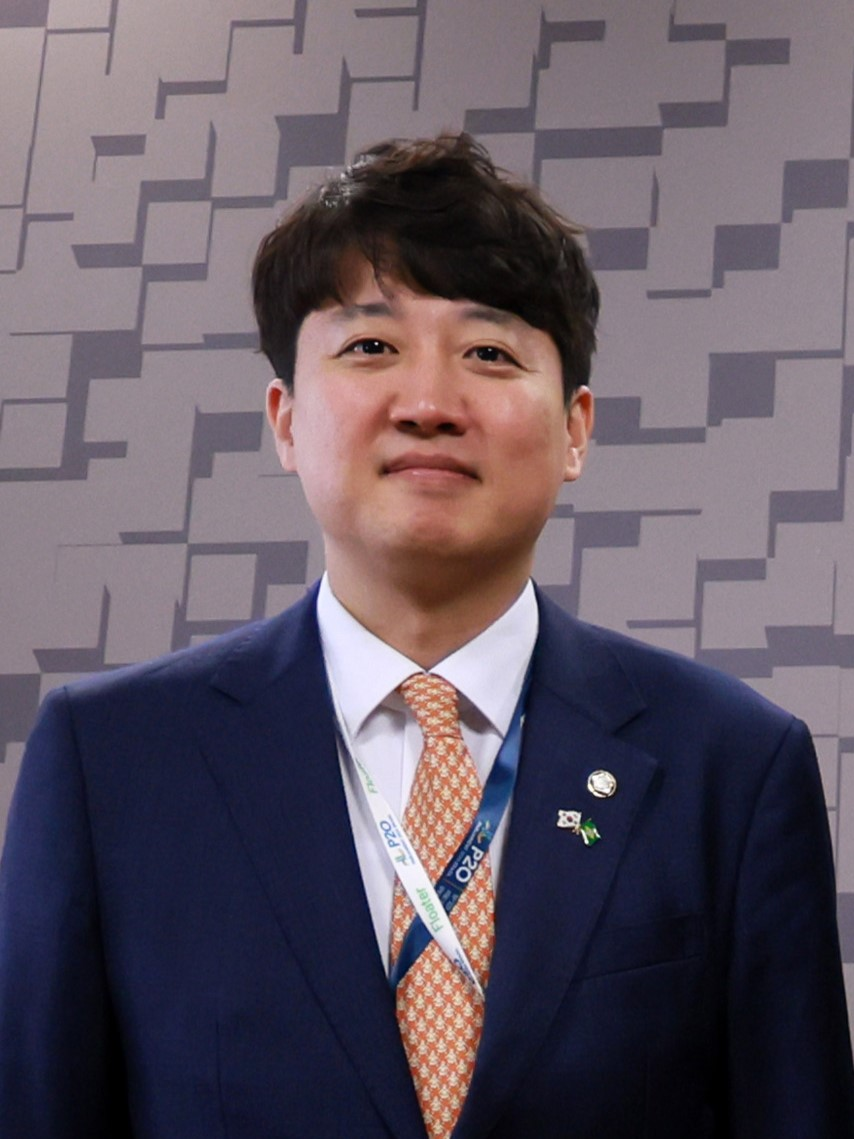
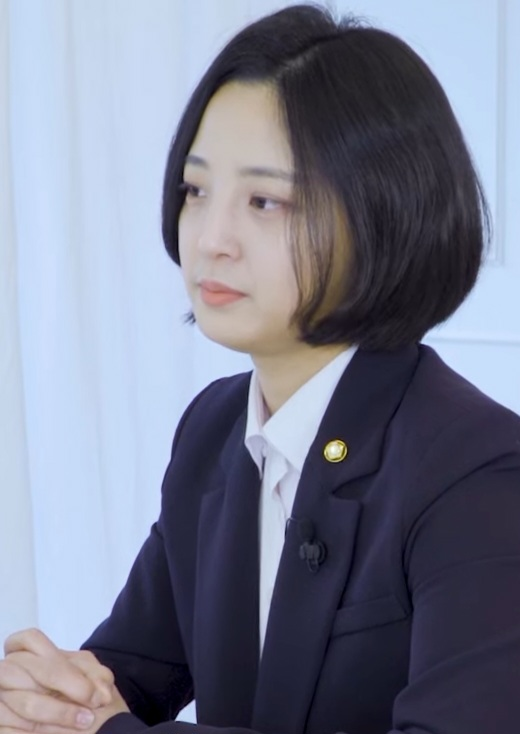
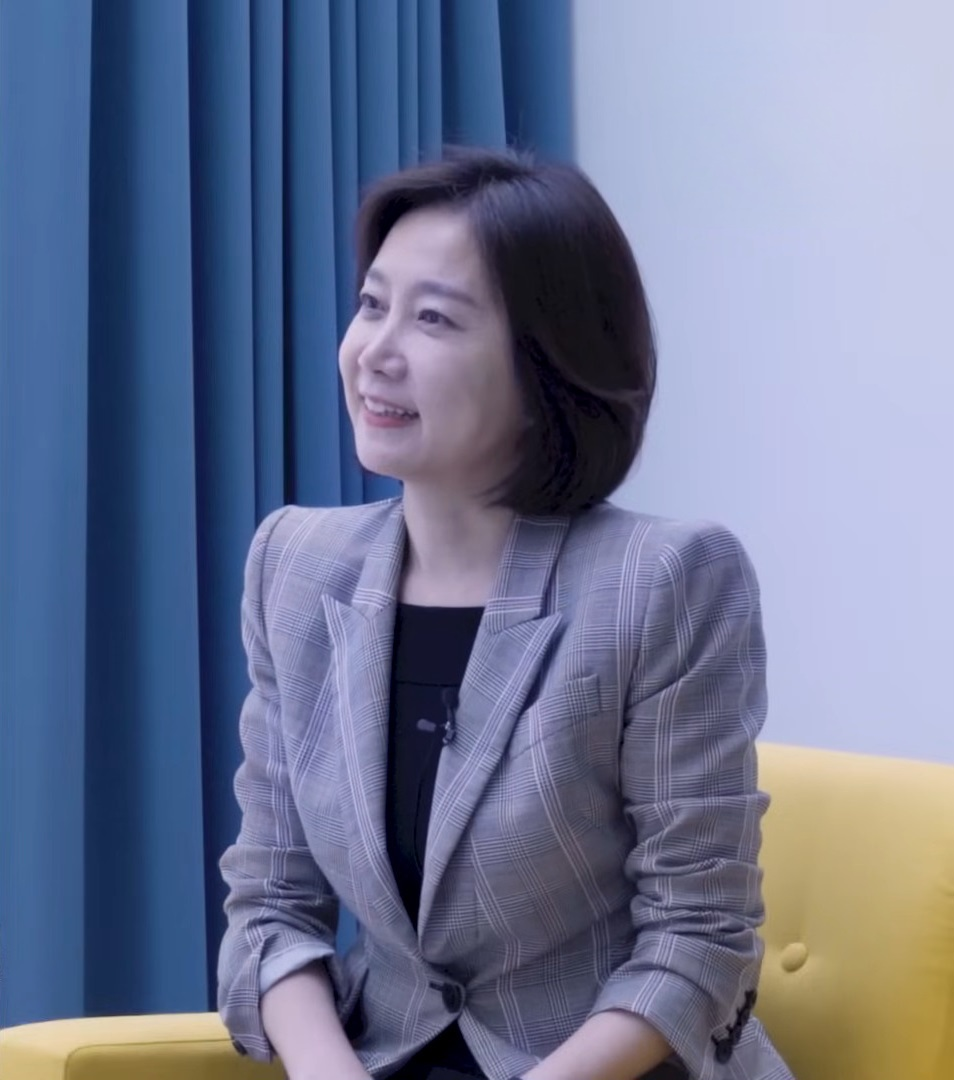
Lee Jun-seok (Reform Party), Ryu Ho-jeong (Justice Party) and Her Eun-a (People Power Party) supported the finger pinching conspiracy theorists.

Several politicians have reacted to the finger pinching conspiracy theorists. In 2021, Lee Jun-seok, an alt-right figure and future party leader of the Reform Party, expressed support for the theory after the GS25 incident. He affirmed his support for the theorists during the MapleStory scandal. Ryu Ho-jeong, a Justice Party member and self-proclaimed feminist, also supported the theory and criticized Ppuri. Formerly a game developer at Smilegate, Ryu argued Ppuri had hurt other developers in the video game industry.

Other politician supporters included People Power Party member Her Eun-a and former Democratic Party member Lee Sang-heon, who both supported Nexon during the MapleStory scandal. Heo Eun-a told an interviewer that Ppuri committed antisocial behavior and instigated gender conflicts, which she believed must be penalized. When Lee Sang-heon was later informed by Kyunghyang Shinmun that Nexon's allegations had errors, he stood by his opinion and said, "The point is not a gender issue, but that there is a certain alignment customers find uncomfortable." There were also other reports of the Democratic Party advisors publicly supporting Nexon and the conspiracy theory. Politicians who rejected the theory included Jang Hye-young, a Justice Party member. Jang criticized Lee Jun-seok and expressed sympathy to the people the theorists impacted. She demanded labour inspection for video game industry.

Some authors argued that the theory's staying power originates from the South Korean politics' attempt at appeasing idaenam (a term referring to, sometimes derisively, South Korean men in their twenties). Kyunghyang Shinmun argued that the 2021 South Korean by-elections for the mayor of Seoul, where 72.5% of the male twenties supported Oh Se-hoon from the People Power Party in contrast to 22.2% for Park Young-sun from the Democratic Party, were a wake-up call for both parties, motivating politicians to shift their focus to courting idaenam. Several authors proposed that politicians stop using the gender conflict as a means to win over a certain group's votes.

=== Video game industry ===
The South Korean video game industry was often central to the discussion, with many authors having suspected video game companies of removing people who support feminism. Several publications claimed the finger pinching controversies are an extension of the industry-wide feminist discharge that started back in 2016. (Note: Attributed to multiple references:) Pressian's Park Sanghyeok claimed that the industry's irresistance to the conspiracy theory stemmed from its skewed population over male demographics; according to Game Industry White Paper published by Korea Creative Content Agency, in 2022, only 19.1% of video game industry workers in South Korea were female. The Korea IT Union, in response to Nexon's denunciation of Ppuri, stated that the Korean video game industry has a disproportionately low sense of responsibility for social impact despite its large revenue, and that such immature attitude, listening to baseless accusations and harassing employees or other companies, is unworthy of the industry.

The Counter-antifeminism Emergency Response Committee, founded in March 2024 as a collaborated effort to respond to antifeminism in the video game industry, claimed that they received 77 reports of shunning feminists and women within the industry from August to December 2023, of which 17 cases were workplace bullying, 9 were cyberbullying, and 7 were unfair dismissal. The organization cited numerous incidents where workers were unjustly treated or felt threatened, including: a staff who was fired after having arguments with a male worker who complained about women problems, with an executive explaining their actions were unforgivable; an interviewee who received questions from a company about Ppuri, mere days after the MapleStory scandal; and testimonies that claimed they were seen as feminists because they had short hair or did not wear makeup for meetings.

Nexon received significant criticism for allegedly prioritizing appeasing the theorists. Insiders contacted by Segye Ilbo claimed that, when the company replaced a voice actor in July 2016 in reaction to players accusing her of radical feminism, Nexon's internal meetings concluded the action was successful in enlarging its playerbase. Segye Ilbo argued this foreshadowed Nexon's actions in the MapleStory scandal. An insider report from Kyunghyang Shinmun stated that Nexon ran a web scraping software biased toward male-dominated forums, as well as a program that rewarded community posts to form public opinion to its liking, though Nexon has denied this allegation. Kyunghyang Shinmun's Yu Seonhui cited a separate fiasco involving officially sanctioned Dungeon & Fighter convention, which predated the MapleStory scandal by a couple weeks and was seen by Yu as a precedent of the Nexon developers promoting misogyny. Prior to the event, Nexon requested its participants to submit their social media account ID, a rule that didn't exist until that year. When questioned, Nexon emphasized "user's right to know." Yu argued that Nexon's policy change coincided with the feminist blacklisting movement from finger pinching theorists, who demanded all participants' Twitter history be searched, and that Nexon made a deliberate move to enable harassment against female players. Yu also cited another incident during that time, where Nexon delisted Dungeon & Fighter YouTube promotion of a singer who supported feminism.

Supporters of Nexon organized a donation event for Nexon-owned foundation and hospitals in reaction to the MapleStory scandal. The participants claimed that the movement is an act of goodwill, and meant as a response to the expression of hatred like the finger pinching gesture. The movement reportedly generated more than ₩60,000,000 from players. Kukmin Ilbo reported that this was repelled by internet forums that demeaned the movement.

Korean WomenLink, a women's rights organization, performed a protest in front of Nexon headquarters as an act against the MapleStory scandal. It also sent the company a written opinion compiled from approximately ten thousand people. WomenLink's protest was later reported to legal authorities by anonymous person, who claimed the finger pinching gesture was misandrist and based his argument on Namuwiki articles. WomenLink was fined ₩1,000,000 by Suwon District Court via summary order in November 2024, citing that its assembly was not reported to relevant authorities beforehand. The organization appealed against the order and demanded a formal trial. On June 12, 2025, the trial court overruled WomenLink's appeal and finalized the penalty, stating that the organization did not uphold the Assembly and Demonstration Act. The judge proclaimed that, despite the organization's explanation that it was a press conference, it had gathered in a specific location to express a joint opinion against Nexon, which thereby constitutes an open-air assembly and should have been legally declared. WomenLink argued the judiciary's decision gave an indulgence to antifeminism.

Seoul Regional Employment and Labor Office made a statement on December 1, 2023 that it would execute for-cause audits against video game companies based in Seoul from December 4 to 31. The audits were called for with the purpose of protecting the industry workers from online harassment by video game players. The office received tip-offs of players making threats to the workers, such as when players cyberstalked the employees' social media and sent private messages to ask them whether they are feminists, or when players visited the companies to demand firing certain workers. The Korean Occupational Safety and Health Act (OSHA) requires the employers to protect labourers from verbal abuse by customers. The office performed on-site audits for 10 major companies, including Nexon and Netmarble, while instructing 523 other companies to conduct a self-audit. It concluded the inspection with taking executive actions against three companies that violated the OSHA, ordering them to prepare manuals for customer service. Kim Yuri, the head of the Korean Women‘s Trade Union, criticized the Labor Office for its feeble measures.

== Bibliography ==
- "「청년의 생애과정에 대한 성인지적 분석과 미래 전망 연구」 결과 발표" ["Gender-Sensitive Analysis and Prospective Study on Youth Life-course" Results Announcement] (HWP) (Press release). Ministry of Gender Equality and Family. Korean Women's Development Institute. March 10, 2021.
- Crotti, Robert; Pal, Kusum Kali; Ratcheva, Vesselina; Zahidi, Saadia (March 30, 2021). Global Gender Gap Report 2021 (PDF). World Economic Forum. World Economic Forum Centre for the New Economy and Society. Cologny/Geneva, Switzerland. ISBN 978-2-940631-07-0.
- Kim, Sooah (August 2021a). "'이대남'과 반 페미니즘 담론: '메갈 손가락 기호' 논란을 중심으로" [Men in their Twenties Angry at Feminism: Discourse Analysis of “Megal and the Finger Controversy”] (PDF). Feminism and Korean Literature (in Korean). 53 (53). The Academic Society of Feminism and Korean Literature: 443–475. doi:10.15686/fkl.2021..53.443. ISSN 1229-4632 – via Korea Institute of Science and Technology Information.
- Brown, Lucien (December 4, 2023). ""The denigration of Korean men's genitals": Precision grip gestures and the multimodal construction of "taking offence" in media discourse surrounding anti-feminism in South Korea". Journal of Language Aggression and Conflict. 12 (2). John Benjamins Publishing Company: 234–262. doi:10.1075/jlac.00088.bro. ISSN 2213-1272.
- Gu, Jihye; Kim, Mincheol (December 2023a). "온라인 공간에서의 반페미니즘 담론에 관한 연구: GS25 남성혐오 논란과 음모론" [Strategies used to disseminate anti-feminist discourse: Conspiracy theories and the GS25“man-hater”controversy]. The Journal of Asian Women. 62 (3). Research Institute of Asian Women: 115–153. doi:10.14431/jaw.2023.12.62.3.115. ISSN 1225-9241.
- 2023 대한민국 게임백서 [2023 Game Industry White Paper] (PDF). Naju-si, Jeollanam-do: Korea Creative Content Agency. February 29, 2024. ISBN 979-11-6677-232-0.
- Kim, Jinsook (September 2024a). "Calling out Feminists: Antifeminist Hijacking of Cancel Culture in South Korea". Television & New Media. 26 (1). Sage Publishing: 88–103. doi:10.1177/15274764241277471. ISSN 1527-4764.
- Yang, Sou Hee (April 8, 2025a). Wagner, Anne; Condello, Angela (eds.). "Unveiling Technology-Facilitated Gender-Based Violence in South Korea: Signs of Gender-Based Violence, Legal Reforms, and the Role of Criminal Law". (In)Visible Signs of Gender-Based Violence. Gender, Justice and Legal Feminism. 1. Gewerbestrasse 11, 6330 Cham, Switzerland: Springer Nature: 353–382. doi:10.1007/978-3-031-35513-4_18. ISBN 978-3-031-35512-7. ISSN 2948-1651.
