= Han Woo Park =

Korean social scientist

Han Woo Park (Korean: 박한우) is a Korean academic and professor at the Department of Media and Communications, Yeungnam University.He is a Highly Ranked Scholar and listed among the world's top 2% of researchers.He is also the recipient of the Springer Nature Editor of Distinction Awards 2026,where he received the Springer Nature Editorial Contribution Award for being one of its most active and fastest handling editors for submitted papers and the Author Service Award, for being in the top 20 percent for the speed at which authors receive a first decision on their submissions.

== Academic career ==
Park graduated from Hankuk University of Foreign Studies, and completed post-graduate work at Seoul National University, South Korea. He received his doctorate from State University of New York at Buffalo, USA. Later he joined the Royal Academy of the Netherlands and the Oxford Internet Institute.

Han Woo Park is one of South Korea's most highly cited social science scholars. He is recognized as a pioneer in Webometrics and an expert on Internet activism in South Korea. He is also the chair of the Korea organizing committee for Internet Research 15 (IR15). Park has frequently shared his insights in national and international media, including AJP, Turkish news agency Anadolu and Singapore's CNA 938, covering topics such as AI and its fair use, society, politics, election, and BTS. His research mainly focuses on online media and biggish data in academic, governmental, and business communications. In a recent study, Park shows how blockchain prediction markets shaped global engagement during Korea's 2024 impeachment events., which is the first real-world example of what researchers call “cryptocurrency democracy". He is currently Editor in Chief of Quality & Quantity and the Journal of Contemporary Eastern Asia.

Park was elected as International Communication Association (ICA)'s Distinguished Fellow in 2023. He is also the founder of World Association for Triple Helix & Future Strategy Studies (WATEF).

Park has been co-awarded for the best paper in EPI-SCImago in 2016 and included in the list of core candidates of the Derek de Solla Price Memorial Medal since 2017.

Park is a editor-in-chief of Journal of Contemporary Eastern Asia, Quality & Quantity, ROSA Journal, and founder of the Data, Innovation, Social networks, Convergence (DISC) International Conference.
