= Storytaco =

South Korean video game developer

Storytaco Co., Ltd
- Trade name: Storytaco
- Native name: 스토리타코
- Type: Private
- Industry: Video games
- Founded: 2018
- Founder: Jaeil Kim
- Headquarters: Seocho District, Seoul, South Korea
- Number of employees: 30 (2021)
- Website: storytaco.com

Storytaco (Korean: 스토리타코) is a South Korean video game developer founded in 2018 and headquartered in Seoul. The company develops interactive narrative games, including visual novels full motion video titles. Its portfolio includes the dating simulator Dangerous Fellows and the FMV interactive movie game Five Hearts Under One Roof.

== History ==
Storytaco was established in 2018 by Jaeil Kim, who serves as the chief executive officer. Storytaco had 30 employees in 2018 and had at the time accumulated over 200,000 subscribers. The company's marketing efforts for Dangerous Fellows included a partnership with Tilting Point, which committed up to US$10 million in marketing expenditures. The company first gained international attention with the release of Dangerous Fellows, a visual-novel dating simulator set during a zombie apocalypse. Within two weeks of launch, the game ranked first in the story-based category and experienced notable success in markets including the United States, Canada, and Vietnam.

== Games ==
=== Dangerous Fellows ===
Dangerous Fellows is a visual-novel dating simulator that incorporates a narrative set against a zombie apocalypse. The game has achieved over 2 million installs and has contributed significantly to Storytaco's recognition in the global gaming market.

=== Five Hearts Under One Roof ===
Storytaco released the FMV interactive movie game Five Hearts Under One Roof (하숙생이 전부 미녀입니다만) on October 18, 2024. The game, which utilizes content from the YouTube channel 밀크필름, was introduced via a crowdfunding campaign on the Tumblbug platform in June 2024, offering discounted pricing and additional rewards for backers. It was released on October 18, 2024.

== Controversies ==
In early October 2024, promotional material for Five Hearts Under One Roof became the subject of controversy. Some users interpreted a hand gesture shown in a promotional image as a misandryc "hook finger" (집게손) gesture. In response, the director issued a statement via YouTube and Steam patch notes, clarifying that the gesture was not intended to convey any misandryc meaning but was the result of a natural hand motion in a first-person view during the scene. The affected image was removed from the Steam store and is scheduled to be replaced following re-filming.
