= Igniting the Internet: Youth and Activism in Postauthoritarian South Korea =

2016 book by Jiyeon Kang

- Author: Jiyeon Kang
- Publisher: University of Hawai‘i Press
- Publication date: 2016
- ISBN: 978-0-8248-5656-4

Igniting the Internet: Youth and Activism in Postauthoritarian South Korea is a book by Jiyeon Kang about internet activism in South Korea during the 21st century.

== Synopsis ==
The book provides historical analysis of two protests through 60 interviews and analysis of internet posts and websites. The first is the candlelight vigil that was held after the Yangju Highway Incident, where two South Korean teenage girls were accidentally killed by United States military personnel. The second is the 2008 US beef protest in South Korea, which was sparked by the public's concern about mad cow disease entering the country through beef imported from the United States.

== Reception ==
A review in Communication and the Public writes that the book is a must-read for those interested in internet activism, especially because although South Korea has been an early adopter of internet technologies, their experience has not been critically examined by scholars. Similarly, the Quarterly Journal of Speech notes the Western bias of internet scholars, and writes that this book is unique because of its focus outside of that sphere.

== See also ==
- Internet activism in South Korea
