= Mighty girl effect =

Psychological effect

The mighty girl effect, also called the eldest daughter effect, is the finding that fathers whose eldest child is a girl tend to display less sexism and greater awareness of gender inequalities than those whose eldest child is a boy.

Researchers in the United States and United Kingdom have been studying this effect since at least the late 1970s and have published several significant discoveries since 2011.

== Incidence ==
The only demographic found to have this type of effect on parents is eldest, school-age daughters. No data compiled by researchers indicating a similar effect from non-firstborn children, nor children within a different age range, was found to be statistically significant. Similarly, research has found that the ratio of sons to daughters is not significant to the mighty girl effect. Ultimately, if the daughter is not the first born, there is no observable difference in the progressiveness of fathers' opinions. However, research has found that there is statistically significant evidence to show that this effect extends beyond biological first born daughters, and also applies to adopted daughters and stepdaughters, so long as they are the first daughter in their family.

More specifically, research has shown that the daughters' influence on the father's beliefs is most prominent when they are around high school age. This changes over time: Studies show that the father's view increases in progressiveness over time, but peaks as their daughters enter school.

== Social norms ==
In relevance to the mighty girl effect, social norms are defined as "a feature of collective life within a society". Social norms measure a society's belief that people should behave in the generally accepted way. The mighty girl effect deals with gender norms, specifically.

Previous studies conclude that norms are stable throughout life after being developed in adolescence, but the mighty girl effect finds that norms can change throughout life and be formed by adult experiences. One study clarifies that "first experiences" tend to have significant effects on people, and therefore the mighty girl effect could be considered an exception to the traditional "norms develop in adolescence" viewpoint. The effect measures the change in men's attitude towards the traditional male breadwinner norm, the idea that in an ideal society men earn the income for their families, and women stay at home. The mighty girl effect found that not only were men less likely to subscribe to traditional gender norms as a result of having a first born daughter, but the effect becomes more pronounced as time passes and their daughters enter high school, indicating change over time. This means that the more a man is exposed to the first hand experiences of women in society, the less likely he is to believe in traditional gender norms.

== Political and economic effects ==
Father's whose eldest children are female are more likely to support challenging traditional gender norms and have more progressive views on political and economic policy. This is evidenced by voting records. According to research conducted by Dr. Jill Greenlee, these fathers were significantly more likely to vote for Hillary Clinton in the 2016 presidential election, as opposed to fathers of eldest sons. They are more likely to support more progressive policies on issues like gun control, enforcement of laws against sexual harassment, and equal opportunity for women in school and college athletics, and tend to oppose the gender pay gap.

== Cause ==
Though none of the research that currently exists on the mighty girl effect has offered a definitive reason for this affect, many researchers have offered their own theories. Dr. Greenlee suggests, "We know from studies by other researchers that men spend more time with their firstborn daughter than with subsequent daughters, so it may be that firstborn daughters are uniquely situated to influence their fathers by virtue of the time they spend together." In addition, some researchers believe that having a first-born daughter is the closest view of the female experience a man could ever possibly experience.

As for the age specification, researchers have posited that having a school-aged daughter is the time in which father's progressiveness peaks is due to the fact that this is when the pressure to abide by gender norms becomes most apparent to children and parents alike.

== See also ==
- Parenting
