= Obscene gesture =

Expression of contempt

An obscene gesture is a movement or position of the body, especially of the hands or arms, that is considered exceedingly offensive or vulgar in some particular cultures. Such gestures are often sexually suggestive.

== The finger ==
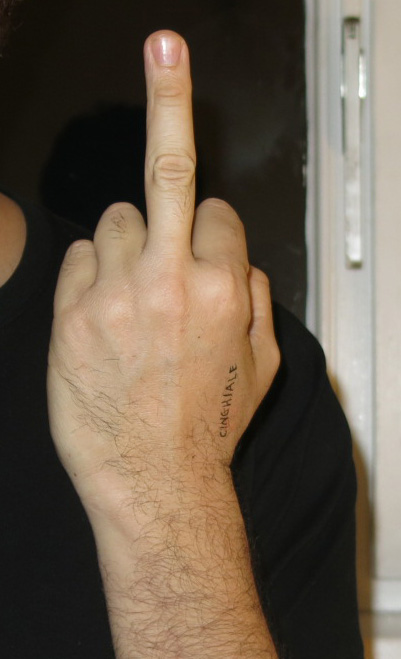
The finger

Although "the finger" has been called "the universal sign of disrespect", it is not truly universal. For example, in Japanese Sign Language, when the palm is facing out, it is recognized as the character せ ("se"). Many other gestures are used in addition to, or in lieu of, the finger in various parts of the world to express the same sentiment. In some parts of the world, "the finger" does not have any meaning at all.

In India, Pakistan, and Sri Lanka, the social circles exposed to the western cultures use the middle finger gesture in the same sense that it is used in those cultures. The same is true for most South Asian countries.

In Portugal, this gesture is also called "Pirete" or "Manguito".

== V sign ==
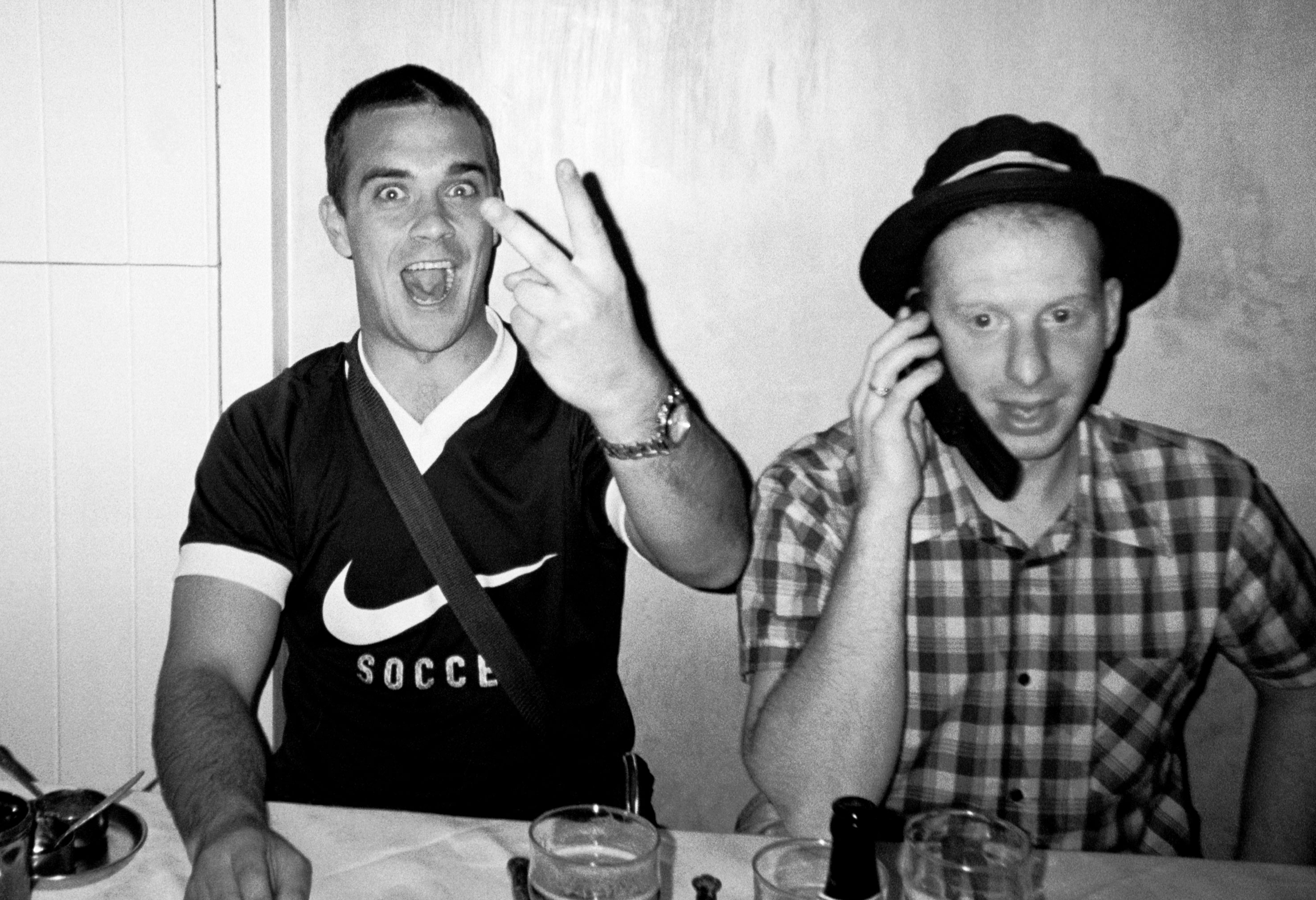
Singer Robbie Williams using a V sign

In the Commonwealth of Nations countries (except Canada), the V sign as an insult (the middle and index fingers raised, and given with back of the hand towards the recipient) serves a similar purpose to the finger. The V sign with palm face outwards is used to signify victory or as a peace sign.

== Dulya ==
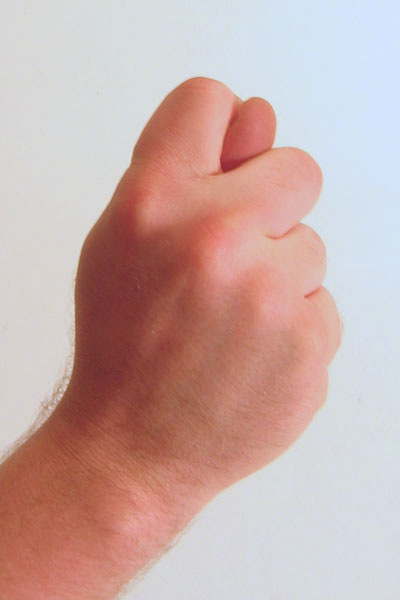
The dulya (Дуля) or fig sign.

More commonly in Russian-influenced areas, the dulya (also known as fig sign or shysh). This gesture is most commonly used to refuse giving of aid or to disagree with the target of gesture. Usually it is connected with requests for a financial loan or assistance with performing physical work. The gesture is typically made with the hand and fingers curled and the thumb thrust between the middle and index fingers. This gesture is also used similarly in Indonesia, Turkey, Korea, China, Mongolia, Hungary (called "fityisz"), South Slavic countries (shipak/šipak) and Romania ("ciuciu").

== Corna ==
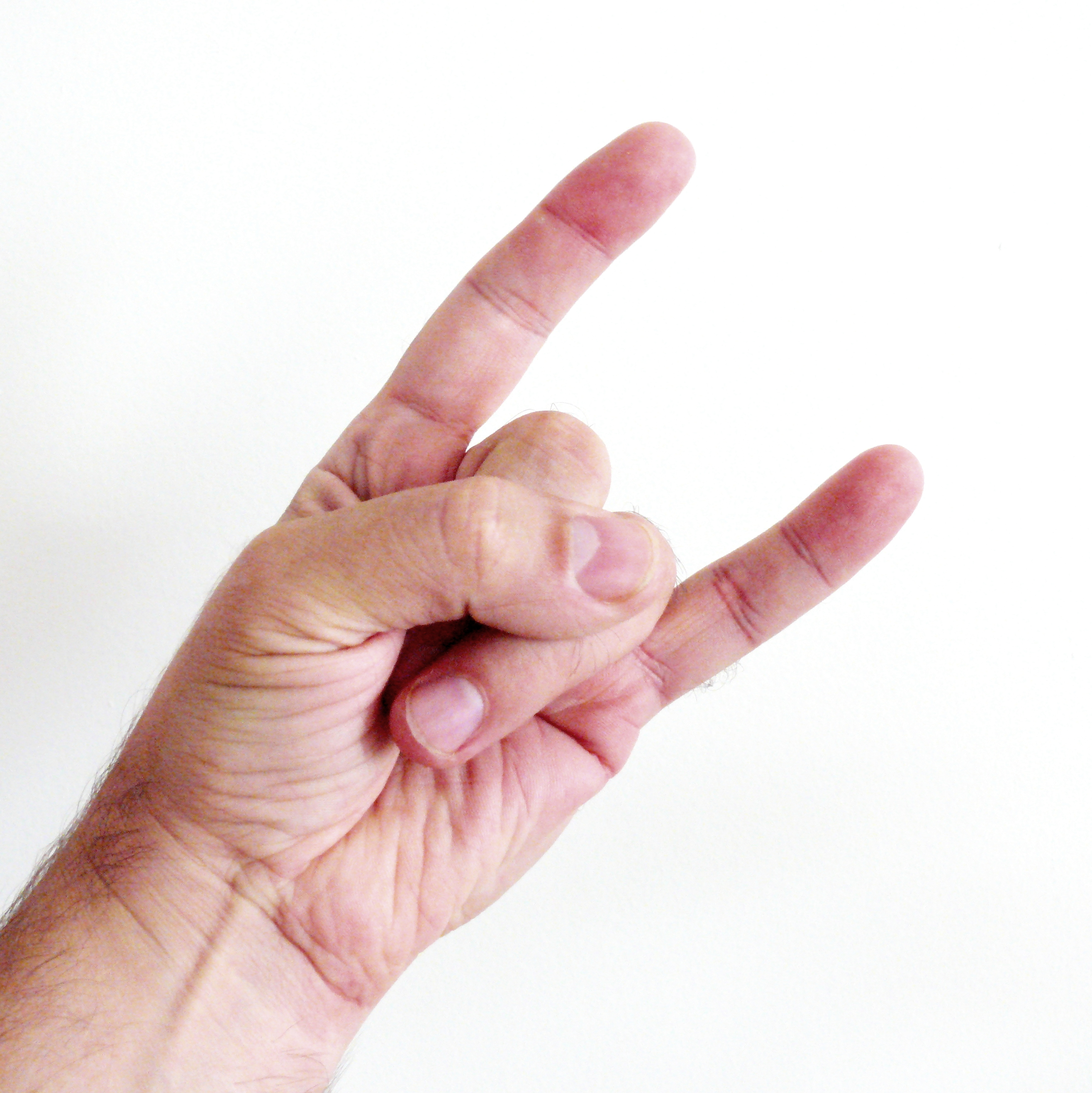
corna; also known as the sign of the horns

The sign of the horns, or corna in Italian ("horns"), is a gesture with various meanings depending on culture, context, or the placement or movement of the gesture. It is especially common in Italy and the Mediterranean region, where it generally takes on two different meanings depending on context and positioning of the hand. The first, more innocuous usage of the gesture in Italy and the Mediterranean is deployed for apotropaic or superstitious purposes, as a way to ward off bad luck or the "evil eye". This usage of the gesture may also be employed when confronted with unfortunate events or even when such events are mentioned, and it is usually performed with the fingers pointed downward (or simply not directed towards someone) to distinguish the apotropaic usage of the gesture from the obscene usage of the gesture.

The second usage of the gesture, also found in Italy and other Mediterranean and Latin countries (including Argentina, Brazil, Colombia, Cuba, France, Greece, Portugal, Spain, and Uruguay) is instead obscene, disrespectful, and insulting. Unlike the first usage of the gesture, this obscene usage of the gesture involves pointing the two fingers upward or directing the gesture towards someone and swiveling the hand back and forth. This usage of the gesture implies cuckoldry in the person it is directed towards. The common words for cuckolded in Italian, Greek and Spanish are cornuto, κερατάς (keratas) and cornudo respectively, literally "horned".

== Moutza ==
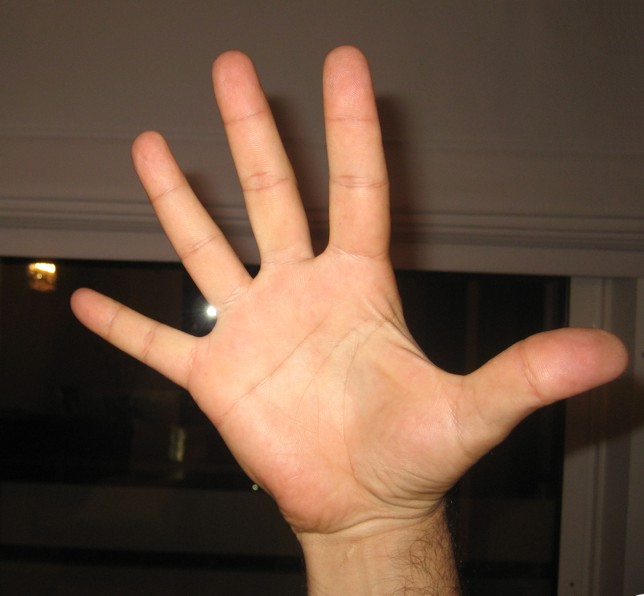
Single moutza.

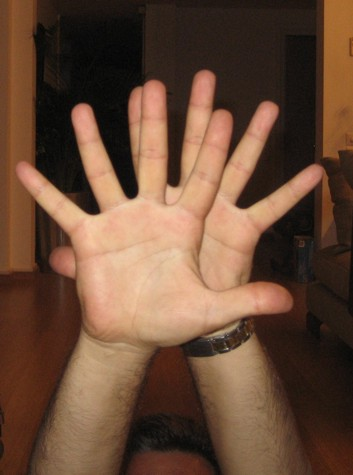
Double moutza.

In Greece, the five fingers are spread wide and the palm is pushed towards someone in a gesture known as the Moutza. The middle finger is still used though, and it is considered more insulting. Another variation of the middle finger is used, where all the fingers but the middle one are spread wide while moving the hand back and forth in the axis the middle finger creates. In this gesture, the thumb sometimes touches the middle finger. The insult of this is equivalent to the finger.

In Iranian culture, a similar gesture is used to represent "Dirt on your head", a verbal insult that is often used, implying that the receiver did something idiotic, or can't do something so easy, or just to humiliate.

In some African and Caribbean countries, a similarly obscene gesture is extending all five digits with the palm facing forward, meaning "you have five fathers" (thus calling someone a bastard).

In Iraqi and Assyrian culture, abruptly thrusting the palm of the hand to someone means they are worthy of shame and are dishonourable.

== Middle finger ==
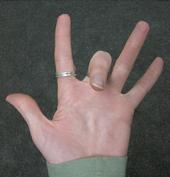
In some Arab countries, this gesture serves the same purpose and meaning of a raised middle finger.

In former Persia, mainly Iran and Iraq, a gesture involving exposing only the thumb in a vertical orientation—a thumbs up—is used instead of the finger to express roughly the same sentiment – roughly equivalent in meaning to "shove it up your ass/arse," "up yours," or "go fuck yourself".

In some Arab countries, especially Egypt, the middle finger is lowered towards the palm and pointed towards someone, while all other fingers are kept straight. It could be considered the opposite movement of the traditional middle finger gesture, but it serves the same purpose and meaning.

In July 2025, in an Australian rugby league match between the Canterbury-Bankstown Bulldogs and the Wests Tigers (two clubs with large Middle Eastern fanbases due to their location in Greater Western Sydney) in the National Rugby League (NRL), several Tigers players celebrated a try in front of Bulldogs fans using the gesture, dubbed by the Australian media as the "Arab middle finger" or khawd (Arabic: خوض). The gesture was criticised by many fans as being obscene, unsportsmanlike and disrespectful.

== Biting the thumb ==
In Elizabethan England, this gesture was performed by placing the tip of the thumb behind the front teeth and flicking it forward. It can be interpreted as being equivalent to giving someone the middle finger or challenging to a fight. This version is still in use in some countries.

In William Shakespeare's play Romeo and Juliet, Capulet's servant Sampson starts a fight by "biting his thumb" at Abram, Montague's servant.

== Okay gesture ==
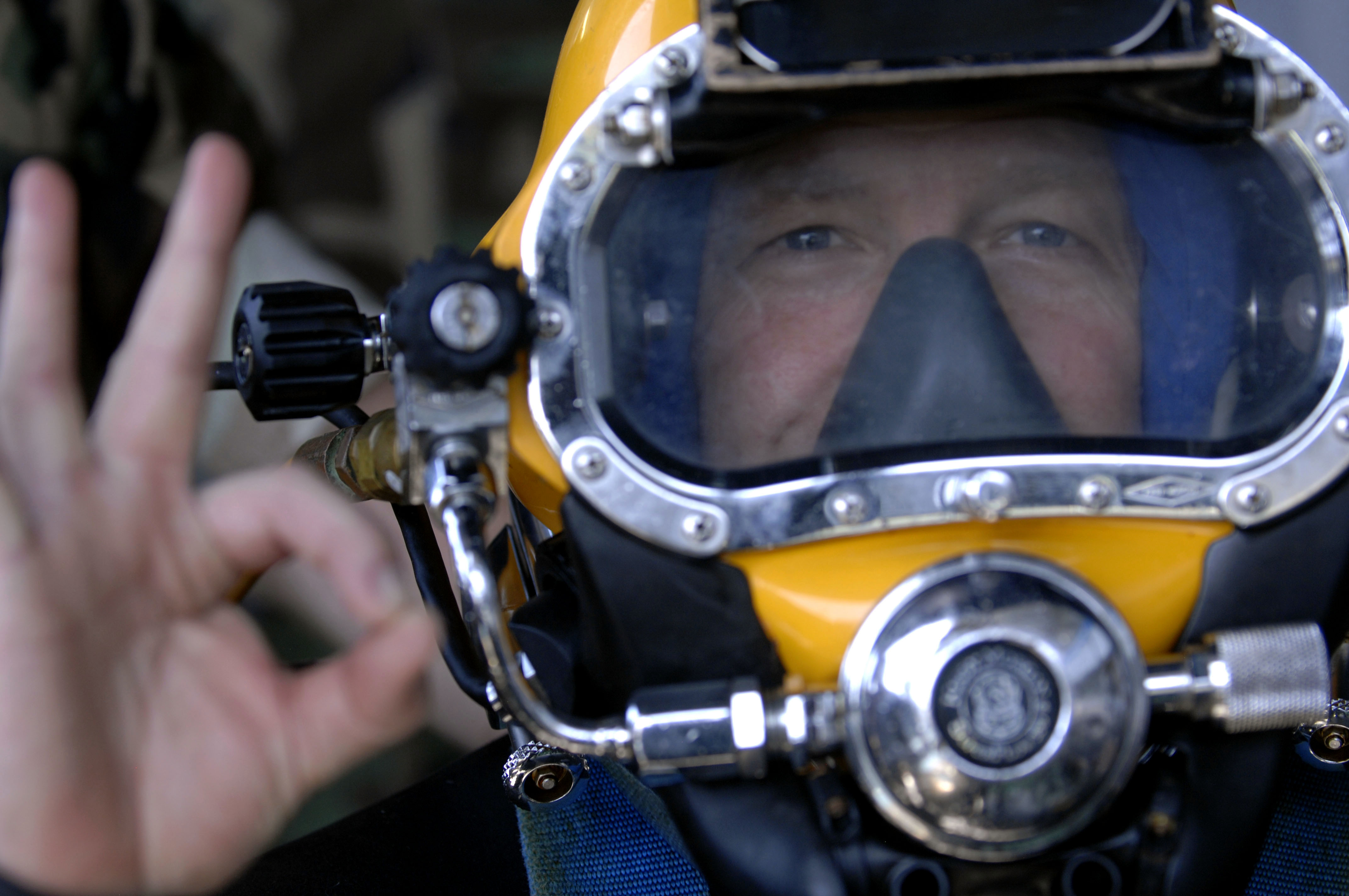
In some Arab countries, this gesture bears negative, vulgar, or offensive meanings.

While widespread use of the OK gesture has granted it an international connotation of assent, it also bears negative, vulgar, or offensive meanings in parts of the Middle East and the Mediterranean regions. In contrast to Japan's use of the expression to represent coins and wealth, the gesture's "O" shape stands for "zero" meaning "worth nothing" in France, Belgium, and Tunisia.

In many Mediterranean countries such as Turkey, Tunisia, and Greece, as well as in the Middle East, parts of Germany, and several South American countries, the gesture may be interpreted as a vulgar expression resembling a human anus, either as an insult ("You are an asshole"), or an offensive, homophobic reference to homosexuality and the act of sodomy. In Brazil, it can be synonymous with giving someone the middle finger.

In the Arab world, this sign represents the evil eye, and is used as a curse, sometimes in conjunction with verbal condemnation.

In the 2010s, the gesture began to develop a vulgar connotation in the United States as a white power symbol, with the three upheld fingers resembling a W and the circle made with the thumb and forefinger resembling the head of a P, together standing for "White Power".

== Pinching finger gesture ==
In South Korea, starting around 2021 with the finger pinching conspiracy theory, the pinching finger gesture started to be considered an expression of misandry by the proponents of the conspiracy theory as the gesture is the symbol of Megalia, meant to mock to the allegedly small size of Korean men's penises.

Several notable companies and officials have issued formal apologies or other types of responses when the gesture was found in their materials.
