= Gerd Brantenberg =

Norwegian author, teacher and feminist writer

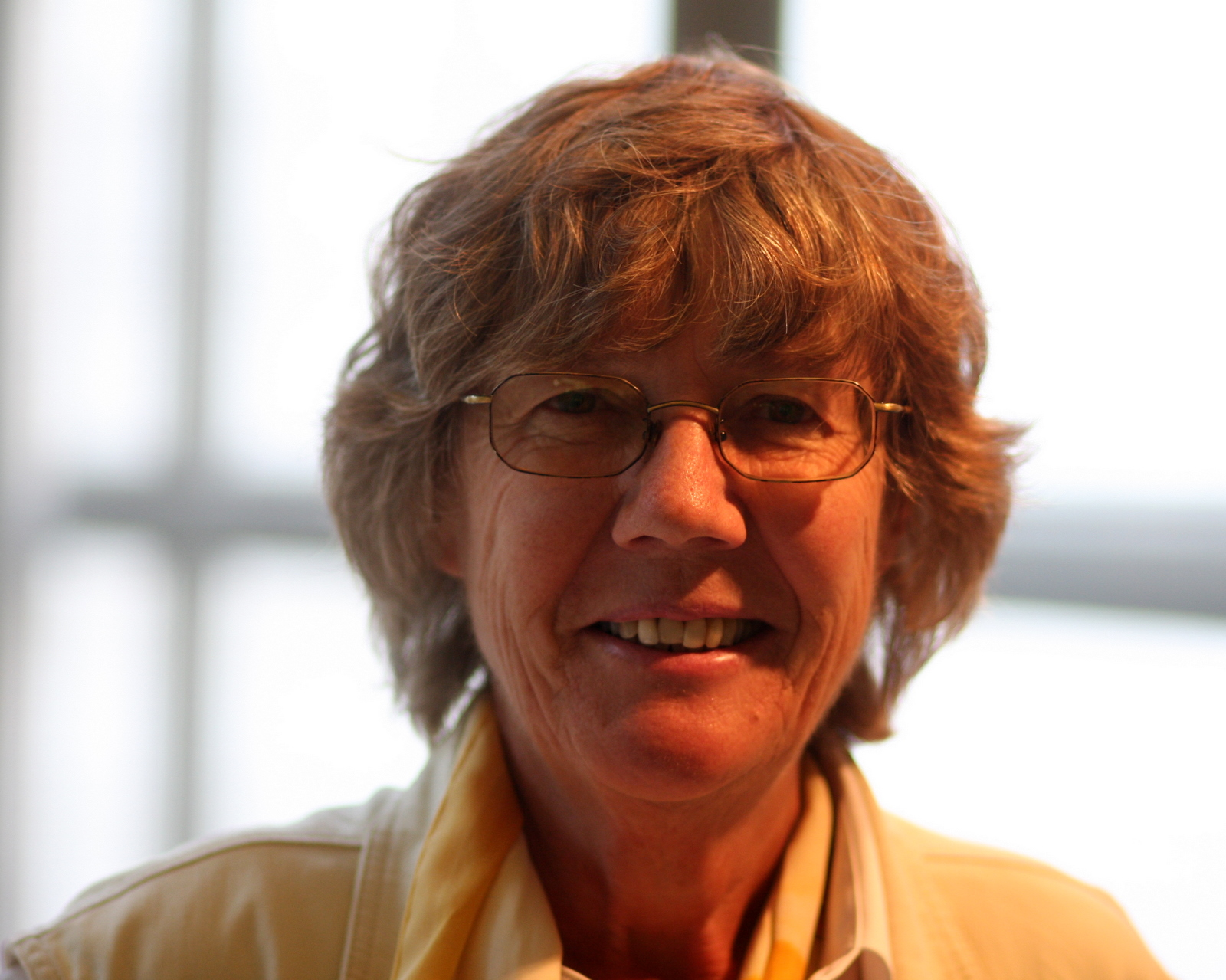
- Brantenberg in Stavanger kulturhus in 2009
- Born: Gerd Mjøen Brantenberg; October 27, 1941 (age 84); Oslo, Reichskommissariat Norwegen (today Norway)
- Education: University of Oslo; University of Edinburgh
- Occupations: Author, teacher, feminist writer
- Writing career
- Genres: Feminist literature, novels
- Notable work: Egalia's Daughters
- Notable awards: Mads Wiel Nygaard's Endowment; 1983; Thitprisen; 1986

Gerd Mjøen Brantenberg (born October 27, 1941) is a Norwegian author, teacher, and feminist writer.

== Biography ==
Brantenberg was born in Oslo, but grew up in Fredrikstad. She studied English, History, and Sociology in London, Edinburgh, and Oslo. She has an English hovedfag (main subject, comparable to a Master's degree), from the University of Oslo, where she also studied history and political science. She worked as a lector in Norwegian and Danish high schools, and she also held positions at the trade union for lectors (Norsk Lektorlag) and the Norwegian Authors' Union.

She worked from 1972 to 1983 in the Women's House in Oslo. She was a board member of Forbundet av 1948, Norway's first gay rights organization, the precursor to the Norwegian National Association for Lesbian and Gay Liberation. She has established women's shelters and has worked in Lesbisk bevegelse (Lesbian movement) in both Oslo and Copenhagen. In 1978, she founded a literary Women's Forum with the purpose of encouraging women to write and publish.

She has been a full-time writer since 1982. She has published 10 novels, 2 plays, 2 translations, and many political songs, and has contributed to numerous anthologies. Her most famous novel is Egalias døtre (Egalia's Daughters), which was published in 1977 in Norway. In the novel, the female is defined as the normal and the male as the abnormal, subjugated sex. All words that are normally in masculine form are given in a feminine form, and vice versa.

In the 1970s, Brantenberg was in a lesbian partnership with the Danish writer Vibeke Vasbo who joined her in Oslo in 1974.

She is the cousin of radio and TV entertainer Lars Mjøen.

== Awards and honours ==
She was awarded the Mads Wiel Nygaard's Endowment in 1983. In 1986 she was awarded the Danish literary prize "Thitprisen", named after the Danish author Thit Jensen.

== Publications ==
Novels that have been published in English:

- What Comes Naturally (London, 1986)
- Egalia's Daughters, (Seattle 1986) or The Daughters of Egalia (London 1985)
- The Four Winds (Seattle, 1996).
