= Quality & Quantity =

- Discipline: Sociology, economics, social psychology
- Language: English
- Edited by: Han Woo Park

Publication details
- History: Since 1967
- Publisher: Springer Science+Business Media
- Frequency: Bimonthly

Standard abbreviations
- ISO 4: Qual. Quant.

Indexing
- ISSN: 0033-5177 (print); 1573-7845 (web)

Links
- Journal homepage; Online archive

Quality & Quantity is a double-blind peer-reviewed academic journal dealing with methodological issues in the fields of economics, psychology and sociology, mathematics, and statistics. The journal is published by Springer Science+Business Media.
