= Egalia's Daughters =

1977 novel by Gerd Brantenberg

- First edition (Norwegian)
- Author: Gerd Brantenberg
- Original title: Egalias døtre
- Language: Norwegian
- Genre: Feminism
- Published: 1977
- Publisher: Pax Forlag
- Publication place: Norway

Egalia's Daughters (Norwegian: Egalias døtre) is a novel by Gerd Brantenberg that was first published in 1977 in Norwegian. The novel is like most of Brantenberg's other works – norm-breaking in such a way that it questions the social, existential and erotic position of women in the society. The book has been translated into several languages and is considered a feminist literature classic.

The name of the former South Korean feminist community Megalia was based partly on the name of this book.

== Content ==
The story is located in the fictional land of Egalia, where stereotypical gender roles are flipped. The protagonist of the novel is a young boy named Petronius. He is active in the fight against the current feminine norms in the society, wanting to reach an equal society and fulfill his dream of becoming a seawoman. Even though Petronius sometimes fantasizes about a quiet and peaceful life with a strong woman to take care of him, he continues his tough fight for a better future for men. In the novel, a number of examples of the current matriarchy are offered, such as poor Petronius being forced to use a “PH” ("penisholder," a humorous invented masculine equivalent to a women's bra for the penis; the Norwegian term for "bra" is BH for "brystholder," aka "breast holder"), experiencing a violent sexual attack, and being introduced to birth control pills for men.

The language in the novel is key to its impact, though the translations to English, German, and other languages do attempt to match the original Norwegian in effect. Language used in society today often reflects patriarchal norms; the novel turns this on its head by making the core of each word feminine, for instance (in the English translation) using “wim” as the root for "person" (instead of "man"), and “menwim" for "masculine person" (instead of "women"). The nomenclature in the book extends to many linguistic categories, such as personal names, where short and rough or "nickname" sounding names are given to wim (Ba, Gro and Rut; compare Tom, Dick, Bob) and menwim are given longer and more melodious, unshortened names (Petronius, Mirabello and Baldrian; compare Rosalie, Victoria, Penelope). The word "human" becomes "huwim."
