= Blind (app) =

Anonymous information-sharing forum for verified professionals

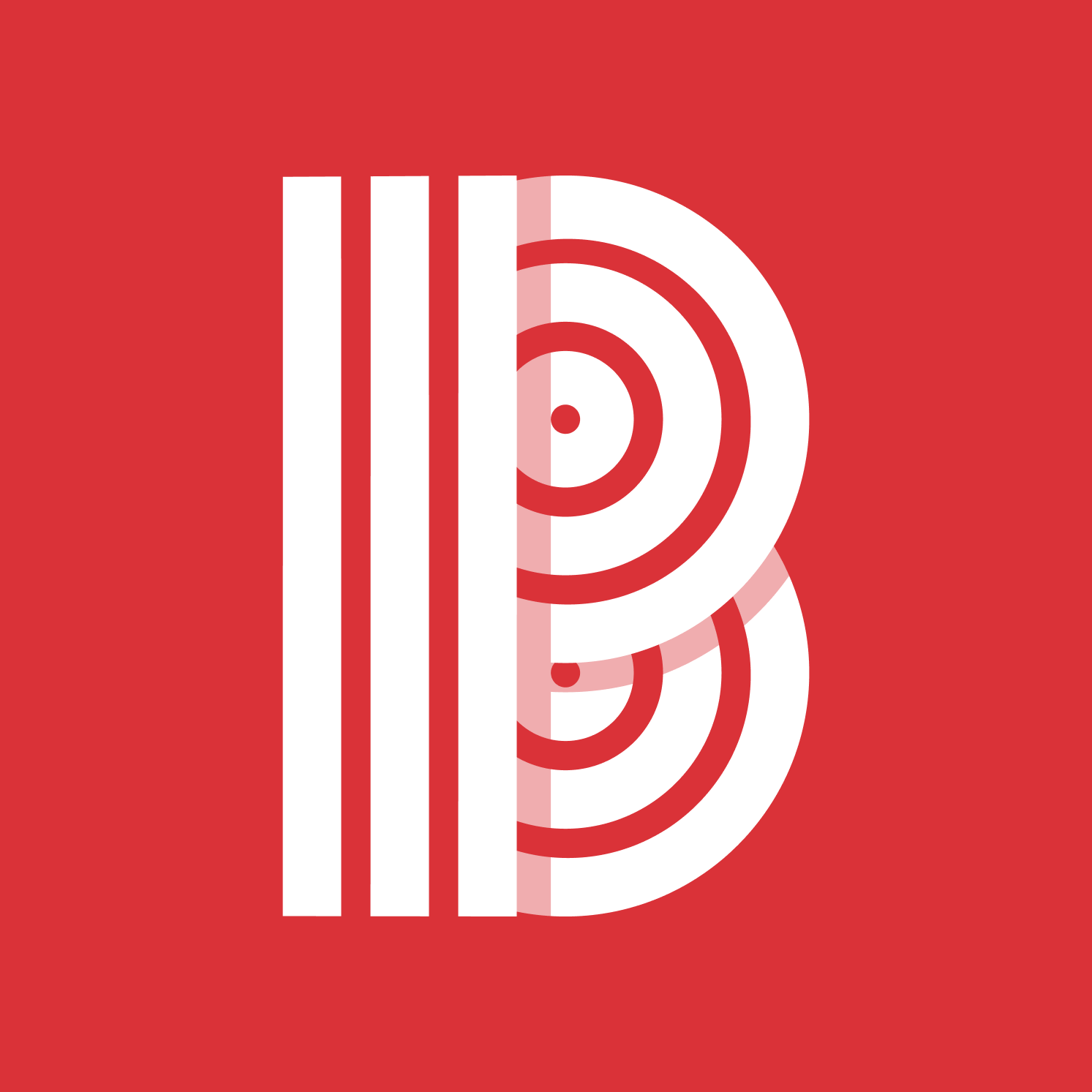
- Founded: 2013; 13 years ago
- Headquarters: San Francisco, California, U.S.
- Owners: Teamblind, Inc.
- Founders: Sunguk Moon; Kyum Kim
- Industry: Professional Networking
- Website: www.teamblind.com

Blind is an app that provides an anonymous forum and community for verified employees to discuss issues. Users on Blind are grouped by topics, company and their broader industry. The app verifies that the registered users actually work in the company through their work email and claims to keep user identities untraceable. However, this claim remains disputable on the basis of Blind being a closed source and with ties to South Korea, a country which enacts controversial defamation laws, which include defamation by factual information under article 307(1).

Blind was founded in 2013 by Sunguk Moon and Kyum Kim. In 2014, it initially launched in South Korea, followed by the U.S. in 2015. The company is based in San Francisco, California.

The app has been in the news in multiple cases, noticeably when its anonymous surveys reveal the frank opinions of employees across industries. However, it is also used for more discussions about everyday topics such as salaries.

According to its app pages on the iOS App Store and Google Play, it has registered employees from over 83,000 companies. According to Forbes, the app is being used worldwide and is influencing corporate decisions by giving executives information about employees' concerns.

Employees from various companies have provided their input on situations at their workplace through the app's surveys and chats, including the Korean Air VP rage 7 sacking incident, Uber sexual harassment claims, Google memo, Amazon employment conditions and problems and 2026 tech layoffs.
