= Breadwinner model =

Family structure centered on breadwinner

The breadwinner model is a paradigm of family centered on a breadwinner, "the member of a family who earns the money to support the others." Traditionally, the earner works outside the home to provide the family with income and benefits such as health insurance, while the non-earner stays at home and takes care of children and older adults. The breadwinner model largely emerged in Western cultures after industrialization. Before industrialization, all members of the household—including men, women, and children—contributed to the economic productivity of the household. Gender roles underwent a redefinition as a result of industrialization, with a split between public and private roles for men and women that did not exist before industrialization.

Norwegian government policy has increasingly targeted men as fathers, as a tool of changing gender relations. Recent years have seen a shift in gender norms for the breadwinner role in the United States. A 2013 Pew Research study found that women were the sole or primary breadwinners in 40% of heterosexual relationships with children.

== Rise ==
In Britain, the breadwinner model developed among the emerging middle class towards the end of the Industrial Revolution in the mid-nineteenth century. Before this, in low-income families, a subsistence wage was paid based on the individual worker's output, with all family members expected to contribute to household upkeep.

There was another side to the transformation of wage relations in mid-19th-century Britain involving two closely related changes: first, a shift in the prevailing wage form, from a joint to an individual payment; and second, a shift in the predominant subsistence norm of a living wage, from a family group's income to the ideal of an adult male-breadwinner wage. This is the notion that the wage earned by a husband ought to be sufficient to support his family without his wife and young children having to work for pay.

The increase in wages among skilled laborers and lower-middle-class workers allowed a far larger number of families to support the entire family unit on a single wage, and the breadwinner model became an attainable goal for a far wider proportion of society. Within this model, "The division of labour in parenting tasks can also be classified as 'caring about' (breadwinning) and 'caring for' (nurturing) children".

== Advantages ==
In the United Kingdom, the emergence of the breadwinner norm coincided with and helped to facilitate the removal of children from the workforce. In 1821, approximately 49% of the nation's workforce was under the age of 20. Throughout the century, multiple pieces of legislation were enacted, limiting the age at which a child could enter the workforce and establishing mandatory education standards.

Historically, families that rely on the earning power of one parent have had a lower divorce rate than families in which both parents are employed. However, a lower divorce rate is not universally accepted as a positive facet of society. A primary reason women in domestic abuse situations choose not to divorce or report their spouses is economic dependence on their partner. Marriages in a breadwinner economy may last longer or be less likely to end, but this may be an effect of the economically disadvantaged partner lacking the freedom to end a bad marriage.

== Disadvantages ==
One associated disadvantage is that 'male breadwinner regimes make women dependent within marriage cohabitation especially when they have young children'. In societies where the breadwinner model is present, it is common for the non-earner (predominantly women) to have broken career paths, providing unpaid labor to the family or working part-time. This contributes to the fact that, on average, women obtain lower levels of lifetime earnings than men. This income disparity can often lead to an increase in financial insecurity or poverty – predominantly affecting women – if the relationship collapses. Another risk that has been identified with this has been a higher exposure to domestic violence, which has been associated with the non-earner's lack of independent resources.

Since the US economy has evolved past the breadwinner economy, studies have examined the well-being of working mothers. Data spanning more than 10 years showed that, on average, working mothers are happier than stay-at-home mothers, report better health, and have lower rates of depression.

=== Effect on gender identity ===
As breadwinning has been part of male identity in societies with a breadwinner economy, people may continue to expect men to take on a breadwinner role, and some may oppose women taking on that role. However, people in younger generations report less strict gendered expectations for men to be a breadwinner. When surveyed, people across generations report that it is more important for their spouse to be a good partner or parent than for their partner to be a breadwinner.

== Decline of the male breadwinner ==
In 2013, the UK female employment rate reached 67.2 percent, the highest since the Office for National Statistics's records began. As women's presence in the professional world has grown, as has support for gender equality, male–female relations in the home have changed, especially the breadwinner paradigm. The breadwinner model was most prevalent during the 20 years directly after World War II. During this time, the economy relied heavily on men to provide the main source of income and support the family, while women typically stayed at home to look after the children and undertake domestic work. "Women's support for gender specialisation in marriage began to decline rapidly from the late 1970s through to the mid 1980s, this was followed by an interval of stability until the mid 1990s". "As increasing proportions of women entered the paid labour market during the latter decades of the 20th century, the family model of a male breadwinner and female homemaker came under significant challenge both as a practice and an ideology".

There is now agreement in most literature that the breadwinner model, in which men take primary responsibility for earning and women for the unpaid work of care, has been substantially eroded.

The Nordic countries in particular have begun to adopt the dual-breadwinner model, with high employment rates among men and women, and a very small difference between men's and women's hours of work. Except for Denmark, research by the World Economic Forum has shown that all Nordic countries have closed over 80 percent of the gender gap.

== Gender cliff ==
In many countries, the likelihood of women's contribution to the household income drops sharply above 50% for heterosexual marriages. This gender cliff in the relative income contribution can be explained by both women and men preferring to marry people with higher income than themselves (Hypergamy) together with on average higher income for men.

== Breadwinner mothers ==
The female breadwinner model, otherwise known as breadwinner mothers or breadwinner moms, takes place when the female provides the main source of income for the family. Recent data from the US Census Bureau indicate that "40% of all households with children under the age of 18 include mothers who are either the sole or primary source of income for the family". 37% of these "breadwinner moms" are married mothers who have a higher income than their husbands, and 63% are single mothers.

== Concerns with the decline of the breadwinner model ==
The decline of the breadwinner model has been accompanied by an erosion of the economic support of family members and the "distribution of time and regulation of marriage and parenthood". With two parents in the workforce, there is a risk that a job could undermine family life, consequently leading to relationship breakdown or adversely affecting original family formation.

While some evidence suggests that "women's gains on the economic front may be contributing to a decline in the formation and stability of marriages", one reason for this may be that women with greater earnings and economic security have more freedom to leave abusive marriages. Another possibility is that men are more hesitant about this change in social norms.

== Global variations ==
The ideal of the breadwinning model varies across the globe. In Norway, a country with a strong gender equality ideology, the breadwinner model is less prevalent. Second generation Pakistani immigrants living in Norway experience the effects of this equality and reinforce women's rights to paid work as opposed to the strict male centric ideologies that generations before them practiced. In the United Kingdom, women's rates of employment decline after becoming a mother, and the male breadwinning model is still constant.

In the United States during industrialization, nothing was more central to the American industrial order than the breadwinner ideal. It served to promote commerce while keeping it within proper bounds. The American Federation of Labor adopted the politics of male breadwinning. However, the North and South did not agree on this new cultural ideal, and it contributed to sectional political strife.

== During the COVID-19 pandemic ==
The COVID-19 pandemic caused a workplace transition from office to home. The majority of the world's workforce (93% in 2022) was located in countries with lockdowns. Also, in-person services like daycare and school shut down at the same time. When women, especially women from minority groups, are employed outside the home, it can be challenging to manage their time effectively. These women are already at a disadvantage, and the weakening COVID economy, which has a disproportionate impact on the hiring of racial and ethnic minorities and women, may cause them to lose hours at work and influence their breadwinning role.

== See also ==
- Sexual division of labour
- Sociology of the family

== Notes ==
- Crompton, Rosemary (1999). Restructuring gender relations and employment: the decline of the male breadwinner. Oxford New York: Oxford University Press. ISBN 9780198296089.

Book review: Fagan, Colette (March 2001). "Restructuring gender relations and employment: the decline of the male breadwinner (review)". Work, Employment & Society. 15 (1). Cambridge Journals: 195–212. doi:10.1017/S0950017001230104 (inactive 9 April 2026). JSTOR 23747792.

- Creighton, Colin (September 1999). "The rise and decline of the 'male breadwinner family' in Britain". Cambridge Journal of Economics. 23 (5). Oxford Journals: 519–541. doi:10.1093/cje/23.5.519. JSTOR 23599633.
- Cunningham, Mick (September 2008). "Changing attitudes toward the male breadwinner, female homemaker family model: Influences of women's employment and education over the lifecourse". Social Forces. 87 (1). Oxford Journals: 299–323. doi:10.1353/sof.0.0097. JSTOR 20430858. S2CID 144490888.
- Nagla, Madhu (March 2008). "Male migration and emerging female headed families: Issues and challenges". Asian Women. 24 (1). Research Institute of Asian Women (RIAW): 1–23. doi:10.14431/aw.2008.03.24.1.1.
- Dugan, Emily (19 February 2014). "Number of women in work in Britain hits record high - but figures show the gender pay gap is growing too". The Independent. Independent Print Limited.
- World Economic Forum (2013). Insight Report: The Global Gender Gap Report 2013 (PDF) (Report). World Economic Forum, Switzerland. p. 103.
- Lewis, Jane (Summer 2001). "The decline of the male breadwinner model: The implications for work and care". Social Politics. 8 (2). Oxford Journals: 152–170. doi:10.1093/sp/8.2.152.
- Osawa, Mari (Winter 2006). "The vicious cycle of the 'male breadwinner' model of livelihood security". Women's Asia 21: Voices from Japan. 16 (1). Asia-Japan Women's Resource Center: 1–5. Pdf.
- Pascall, Gillian (2010), "Male breadwinner model", in Pascall, Gillian; et al. (eds.), International encyclopedia of social policy, London New York: Routledge, ISBN 9780415576949 Text.
- Sayer, Liana C.; Bianchi, Suzanne M.; Robinson, John P. (July 2004). "Are parents investing less in children? Trends in mothers' and fathers' time with children". American Journal of Sociology. 110 (1). The University of Chicago Press: 1–43. doi:10.1086/386270. JSTOR 10.1086/386270. S2CID 141718530.
- Thaler, Richard H. (1 June 2013). "Breadwinner wives and nervous husbands". The New York Times.
- Pew Research Center (19 November 2010). The decline of marriage and rise of new families (Report). Pew Research Center.
- Wang, Wendy; Parker, Kim; Taylor, Paul (29 May 2013). Breadwinner moms, mothers are the sole or primary provider in four-in-ten households with children: Public conflicted about the growing trend (PDF). Pew Research Center (Report). Washington, DC. Archived from the original (PDF) on 6 November 2014.
