= Sisain =

South Korean weekly magazine

- Editor-in-chief: Lee Sook-yi
- Former editors: Pyo Wan-soo (publisher)
- Categories: News magazine
- Frequency: Weekly
- First issue: August 29, 2007
- Company: Cham Media Co., Ltd.
- Country: South Korea
- Language: Korean
- Website: www.sisain.co.kr

Sisain (Korean: 시사IN) is a weekly news magazine based in South Korea. It was founded in 2007 by former journalists of Sisa Journal who resigned due to a controversy over editorial independence.

== History ==
The magazine's inaugural issue was published on August 29, 2007, following a labor strike and mass resignation of reporters protesting editorial interference concerning a Samsung-related article. Notable journalists including Joo Jin-woo and Ko Jae-yeol were among the founding members.

In 2013, the Korea ABC Association reported Sisain as the highest in paid circulation among South Korean weekly news magazines, with over 46,000 paid copies between July 2011 and June 2012.

== Awards ==
- The editorial team received the 23rd An Jong-pil Free Press Award (2011).
- Photojournalist Jo Nam-jin received the Korean Journalists Association’s Monthly Award for his coverage of Choi Soon-sil in 2016.
- Journalists Ko Je-kyu, Shin Han-seul, Kim Yeon-hee, and Lee Sang-won were awarded for their feature “Living on Minimum Wage.”
