= Megalia =

2015–2017 South Korean website

The logo of Megalian.com

Megalia (Korean: 메갈리아; RR: Megallia) was a feminist movement on the South Korean Internet. It is most well known for the "mirroring" strategy that participants (Megalians) claimed to have used to defamiliarize misogynist ideas. Megalians mirrored the style of misogynist content but reversed gender roles, intending to provoke laughter or outrage.

The Megalia movement began in May and June 2015 with a surge of feminist trolling on the South Korean Internet forum DC Inside. Participants reported feeling a sense of catharsis after enduring years of misogyny and gender-based harassment online. After moderators on DC Inside banned the posts, Megalians created a series of Facebook groups and an independent website, Megalian.com, which was later banned from Facebook for derogatory language. They continued to mirror misogynist posts but also mobilized for feminist political causes. Megalian activists advocated that women "break the corset" of Korean beauty standards, helped pressure the South Korean government to shut down the non-consensual pornography site SoraNet, and protested violence against women after the 2016 Seocho-dong public-toilet murder case. In December 2015, moderators on Megalian.com banned homophobic posts that targeted gay men. This led the majority of its users to leave for other forums, most prominently the website WOMAD. Although some South Korean feminists continued to identify with Megalia, Megalian.com and the Megalia Facebook groups lost their importance as online hubs and eventually shut down.

Megalia is well known in South Korea for its provocative tactics and for openly espousing feminism at a time when it was not widely accepted by Korean society. Some feminist scholars praised the movement for revitalizing feminism in South Korea and exposing the misogynistic slurs, while others distanced themselves from Megalia, calling themselves "feminists but not Megalians", and criticized their tactics to be divisive, unproductive, or lacking concern for issues that intersect with women's rights. Many Koreans interpreted mirrored posts as expressions of misandry. The controversies associated with Megalia created backlash to Megalia that was an important factor in the rise of antifeminism in South Korea. Far-right users of the Ilbe Storehouse forum quickly developed a rivalry with Megalians that was framed in the mainstream Korean media as a "gender war". The media habitually blamed both Ilbe and Megalia for extremism. Today, "Megalia" remains a shorthand in South Korea for feminism, especially "extreme" or radical feminism, as well as an emblem of South Korean popular feminism.

== Background ==
In 2023, South Korea ranked 30th out of 177 countries on the Women, Peace and Security Index, which is based on 13 indicators of inclusion, justice, and security. In 2023, South Korea has ranked 20th out of 193 countries on the Human Development Index (HDI). In 2025, it ranked 12th out of 172 countries on Gender Inequality Index(GII), making the country the 2nd least gender unequal state in Asia. On the other hand, South Korea ranked low on Global Gender Gap Report, placing 99th out of 146 in 2022, leading to criticism of having deep gender inequalities.

It is also a highly digitized society where Internet forums have been popular since the late 1990s. Two of the most popular forums are DC Inside and ILBE. DC Inside is a mainstream forum "comparable to Reddit in size and scope", and has a predominantly male user base. ILBE is a DC Inside splinter forum dominated by right-wing users. In the 2000s and early 2010s, moderate gains for Korean women's rights caused an anti-feminist backlash on these forums. Users coined a number of misogynist neologisms such as "doenjang-nyeo", "gimchi-nyeo", and "mam-chung", among others. These three terms are negative stereotypes of Korean women at a different stages of life. A "doenjang-nyeo" (Korean: 된장녀; lit. 'bean paste girl') is a college-aged woman who eats cheap meals such as doenjang in order to save money for conspicuous luxuries like Starbucks. (Note: At the time the term was coined, Starbucks was a symbol of sophistication and westernization.) A "gimchi-nyeo" (김치녀; lit. 'kimchi woman') is a slightly older woman (late twenties, early thirties) who takes advantage of financial support from her male partner. The use of the word "kimchi" is a way of saying that this is the stereotypical Korean woman, in the same way that kimchi is the stereotypical Korean dish. Middle-aged Korean women are targeted by the term "mam-chung" (맘충; lit. 'mom-bug'), which "reduces a housewife/mother into a kind of idle and self-obsessed parasite who wastes money without appreciating her husband's struggle as he labors and sacrifices at his workplace, and does not do her own job of disciplining her child." Paired with these negative stereotypes, online Korean misogynists invented ideals for women to conform to. In contrast to the stereotypically Korean "gimchi-nyeo", they coined the term "seusi-nyeo" (스시녀; lit. 'sushi woman') for Japanese women, who they believed to be models of submissiveness and traditional feminine values. These terms became normalized online and even spread to Korean mass media. For example, a large part of the popular song "Gangnam Style" parodied the stereotypes of the Doenjang girl.

== Feminist trolling on DC Inside ==
This post made by early Megalians is titled "We men are rational so we don't hesitate before doing things by chattering like girls." When opened, the viewer sees the content "We simply kill you!" followed by statistics showing that 94% of South Korean felonies are committed by men.

The Megalia movement was sparked on DC Inside. In the spring of 2015, DC Inside users started a forum called "MERS Gallery" for sharing information on the Middle East respiratory syndrome (MERS) outbreak. A false rumor spread that two women with MERS had refused to quarantine and instead went on a shopping trip to Hong Kong. Forum users bashed them and called them "kimchi women". On May 15, 2015, female users began spamming the forum with humorous posts blaming men for all of the world's problems. The women making these posts "began as group of trolls without an explicit activist goal". Their primary motivation was simply "to provoke and irritate young Korean men" who had spent years "ridiculing, denigrating, and bullying" Korean women online. One widely shared post had a title meant to sound like it was written by a male user, "We men are rational so we don't hesitate before doing things by chattering like girls." But when viewers opened the post, they would see the punchline ("We simply kill you!") and statistics showing that 94% percent of felonies in Korea are committed by men. In later interviews, women who had participated in this initial wave of trolling described it as "cathartic" and "exhilarating".

As these trolling posts grew in popularity and spread across the Korean Internet, posters began to take on a more self-consciously feminist attitude. They adopted the name "Megalians" as a portmanteau of "MERS Gallery" and "Egalia's Daughters." Egalia's Daughters is a feminist novel about a world where women are the dominant sex and men are forced into a subordinate role. By reversing gender roles, the novel reveals the misogyny hidden in many aspects of society, especially language. Megalians sought to do the same thing to misogynist language on the Internet, "mirroring" the misogynist language used against women. Popular mirroring posts included such comments as "Men should demurely handle housework at home," "Alcohol tastes best when served by men," and "Men are men's worst enemies." Misogynist words were "mirrored", too: "kimchi woman" became "kimchi man" (김치남; gimchi-nam), meaning a man who judges women by their appearances. "Plastic surgery monster" (성괴; seong-goe) was countered with the homophone "sex buyer" (성괴; seong-goe). "Bean paste girl" was replaced with "mackerel pike man" (꽁치남; kkongchinam), referring to cheap men who refuse to pay for dates. (Note: In Korean culture, it is uncommon for women to pay for dates or for a couple to split the check.)

== Migration to Facebook and Megalian.com ==
Feminist trolling and the use of mirroring language provoked a strong negative response from website moderators. DC Inside banned mirrored terms like "kimchi man" and removed trolling posts. Megalians considered this moderation biased because DC Inside had tolerated—and would continue to tolerate—the misogyny that these posts attempted to mirror. Megalians founded a series of Facebook pages that were taken down for "derogatory language", leading frustrated Megalia users to call Facebook the "Blue ILBE". A Facebook page called "Megalia 4" was formed in September that avoided a takedown by moderating its language and abandoning the "mirroring" strategy. Instead, it focused on internet activism and reporting on instances of gender discrimination.

In the face of repeated bans from the moderators of other websites, a group of anonymous supporters created an independent website named Megalian.com on August 6, 2015. Megalian.com was a message board like DC Inside, featuring boards such as the "best" board, "new posts" board, "Menyeom [meaning suitable for Megalia] board", "news" board, "data" board, "lecture" board, "capture" board, "humor" board, and "free" board. Users were anonymous, but had to make an account using an email address in order to make or react to posts. Megalian.com became very popular within the first few months of its existence. To the Megalians who had migrated from DC Inside, the influx of new users appeared to include many who used "intimate, warm and amenable" language they associated with female-dominated internet spaces. The more aggressive Megalians denounced this manner of speaking and argued that posts on Megalia should be conspicuously hostile in order to offend their opponents.

== Social activism ==
Megalians used their website and Facebook groups to work for feminist political causes. Megalian activism drew on Internet culture and involved humor and vulgar language. Megalians developed a unique vocabulary to describe female liberation. For example, some Megalians called patriarchal society "the DickTrix" ("dick" plus "The Matrix") and described becoming aware of sexism as "taking the red pill". Humor and fun played an important role in building a sense of community among Megalia's users. Many activists found the process of creating and sharing mirrored posts to be enjoyable because it took the power away from misogynist posts that would otherwise feel threatening or uncomfortable. Megalians frequently used the same vulgar language common on male-dominated Internet forums like ILBE, and reclaimed misogynist language by affectionately calling each other "cunt" (보지; boji). The word "corset" became a metonym for the restraints women place on themselves in order to conform to the expectations of a male-centered society. The popular view on Megalia was that all Korean women start out "corseted", but that exposure to feminist posts can help them notice and "break" their corsets. This evolved into the "break the corset" movement in which women consciously rejected traditional Korean standards of female beauty. Participants would often cut their hair and stop using makeup.

=== Shutting down SoraNet ===
SoraNet (소라넷; solanes) was a Korean porn-sharing site notorious for allowing the distribution of illegal pornographic content, including videos of rape, children, and molka (몰카; molka; lit. 'non-consensual spycam videos'). In addition to illegal pornography, SoraNet users allegedly used the site for "invitations", where someone would post a video of an incapacitated woman and invite other users to participate in a gang rape. SoraNet had been active since 1999 and had over one million members in 2015. In October 2015, Megalians began a movement to shut down the website. They made digital infographics, created an online petition, and put post-it notes in public places with messages against SoraNet. Their efforts eventually inspired Korean parliamentarian Jin Sun-mee to demand the Chief of Police take stronger action against SoraNet. In the hours after her speech, Megalians raised ₩10 million ($10,000) for Jin's office. The police began a probe into SoraNet, and on April 6, 2016, South Korean and Dutch authorities cooperated to take down the site. A number of websites attempted to recreate SoraNet, leading Megalian activists to launch anti-"digital sex crime" organizations like Digital Sexual Crime Out (DSO) and the Korea Cyber Sexual Violence Response Center (KCSVRC).

=== Feminist Post-it notes ===
In October 2015, Megalians began sticking Post-it notes with feminist messages in public spaces such as public toilets and elevators. They hoped to spread feminist ideas and attract new participants to the Megalia movement. Megalians would share photos of themselves posting the note and often sign them with the phrase "Megalian in action". They adopted the use of Post-it notes from K-pop fans, who used Post-its to protest unpopular management decisions. The strategy proved effective at attracting newcomers to the website.

=== Reaction to Gangnam station femicide ===
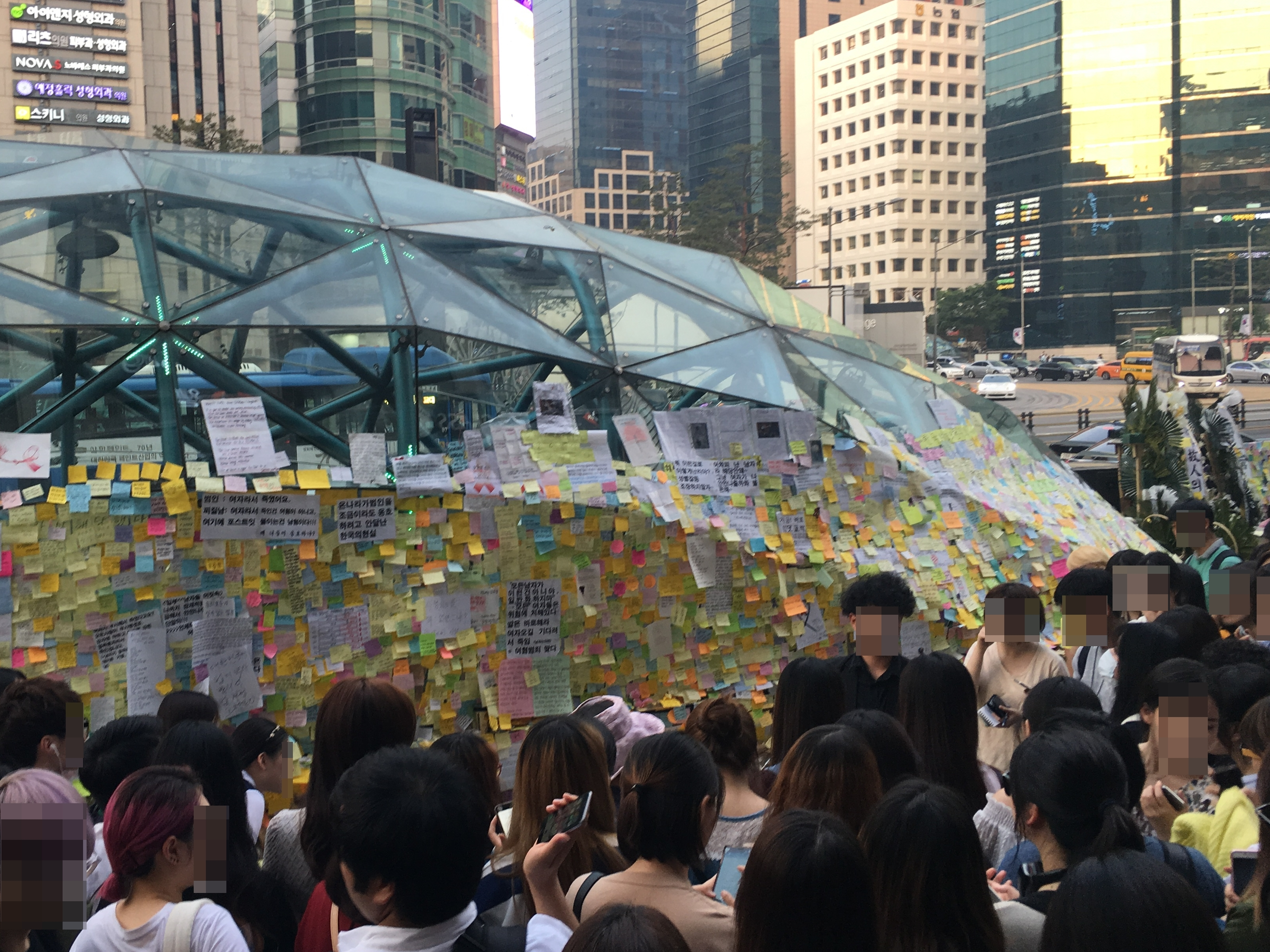
Megalians helped create a memorial to a femicide victim that included 20,000 feminist Post-it notes

On May 17, 2016, a man stabbed a woman to death in the toilet at a karaoke bar near Gangnam station in Seoul. The two had never met before that night, and the murderer later claimed that he did so out of his hatred for women as they had ignored and humiliated him all his life. Thousands of Koreans, including Megalia users, gathered at the subway station to create a memorial for the victim. They left flowers and 20,000 Post-it notes speaking out for women's rights. Megalians helped organize a series on night marches in memorial of the victim and to raise awareness of violence against women. On several occasions, Ilbe Storehouse users carrying anti-mourner or misogynist messages arrived at the memorial and confronted the mourners.

=== Facebook lawsuit and t-shirt fundraiser ===
On May 28, 2016, the Megalia 4 Facebook group began to raise funds for a lawsuit against Facebook. They argued that Facebook had engaged in gender discrimination by taking down two Megalia-related groups while leaving up a ILBE-associated "Kimchi woman" group where a user had posted a video saying that he wanted to kill women. To raise money, Megalians sold t-shirts with the slogan "Girls Do Not Need a Prince". The campaign succeeded in raising ₩112 million ($95,000) from about 3,500 donors, ten times the initial goal. On July 18, Korean video game voice actor Kim Jayeon posted a photo of her "Girls Do Not Need a Prince" shirt on Twitter. Male Korean gamers pressured Nexon, the company that had hired her to do voice acting in the game Closers, to fire her. Nexon did so the following day, explaining their decision by saying they were listening to their customers and that Kim had "exacerbated the issue by posting inflammatory tweets such as 'what's wrong with supporting Megalia?'" Social media harassment forced dozens of those who had stood up for Kim to issue public apologies. The Justice Party (a center-left political party) issued a statement saying that Kim should not have been fired, leading several of its parliamentary members to threaten to withdraw from the party. The protesting members said that it was more humiliating to be associated with Megalia than to be associated with supporters of North Korea (an accusation that the party had faced in the past).

=== Other projects ===
Megalians engaged in a number of smaller feminist campaigns using the website as a platform for organizing. After a Korean man maimed his ex-girlfriend in an acid attack, they successfully lobbied the Ministry of Environment to block online sales of high concentrations of hydrochloric acid. They organized protests against Maxim magazine and a boycott against Namyang Dairy Products for sexist practices. Megalians also compiled a list of misogynist celebrities.

== Reception and criticism ==
Because of its deliberately provocative nature, Megalia's mirroring strategy became a major source of controversy in South Korean society. On the mainstream Korean Internet, Megalia is considered to have been as extreme as ILBE, just on the other side of the political spectrum. It is common to accuse Megalians of misandry. Korean media criticized Megalia for being intentionally provocative and condemned both Megalia and ILBE for having hatred towards the opposite sex. For example, YTN described Megalia as a "female supremacy" community. Historian Jeon Woo-yong criticized Megalia, saying that he judged it to be directly connected to the New Right’s view of humanity—one that claims it is acceptable to discard morals and ethics in pursuit of profit. He stated out that although Megalia and Womad may think of themselves as "the only parties capable of systematically countering Ilbe," their discourse had crossed the moral and ethical boundaries that the society can accept.

Megalia has been criticized for their extreme anti-male sentiments and disrespect and abuse of male historical figures, politicians, and even animals. An example was mockery of Korean men for allegedly having small penises. Megalians sought to mirror body shaming, what cultural anthropologist Sealing Cheng calls "the constant and often cruel subjection of Korean women's appearances to male scrutiny". The website's logo shows a thumb and forefinger almost touching, mimicking how one might measure a small object. Megalians also invented the term "god-Western-man" (갓양남; godyangnam; lit. 'the equivalent of "sushi woman"') to mean a progressive Western man with a large penis. Scholars Donna Do-own Kim and Minseok Yoo argued that the misogynist stereotypes pressured Korean women to "continuously police and prove themselves" so as avoid getting labelled selfish, materialistic, or undesirable. Feminist scholar Donna Do-own Kim, who defends mirroring in general, also called the idealization of Western men "unfortunate" and said that it "shows that fighting misogyny was not just one of the motivations... but the motivation; other social injustices were of lesser importance." In the years since Megalia was active, a conspiracy theory arose in South Korea alleging that radical feminists are inserting the gesture into various media and advertisements. In contrast, feminist scholar Youngmi Kim, defended the mirroring strategy:

As unpleasant, vulgar, polarizing, and ultimately divisive as the strategy was, the mirroring strategy vividly and successfully exposed the misogynistic culture among some Korean men by "throwing back"—mirroring—the very same terminology and demeaning attitude towards them.

Another controversy caused by a mirroring post occurred in October 2015. The post claimed to be from a kindergarten teacher, and declared the user's desire to have sexual intercourse with a jonnini (좆린이), which is Korean slang for a male child. The poster (referred to by the media as "Ms. A") later addressed this, and while admitting the gravity of her statement, claimed that she was merely trying to bring awareness to the fact that male-dominated boards such as Ilbe allegedly routinely discuss sexual desires for underage girls (Korean: 로린이; RR: rorini; lit. 'Lolita girl'). (Note: In news coverage, the offensive word was often replaced with eorini (어린이), the ordinary word for a child, or the first hangul letter of jonnini (좆린이) which is jot (좆) was blotted out to read "O린이". The uncensored post on Megalia can be found here (archived, in Korean).)

Users of Megalia have faced lawsuits that accuse them of defamation for various comments they posted online. For example, Webtoon artist Seonarae (pen name Narm) has filed a lawsuit against members of Megalia. The artist revealed on her blog that "some Megalia members relentlessly hurled criticism and obscene insults at my husband and other family members, using expressions too aggressive to repeat."

Megalians also committed voyeurism online. In 2015, a user of Megalia posted a photo of a man with a headline suggesting they were reporting a “manspreader on the Busan subway in real time.” In the post, the member used coarse profanity and even wrote comments such as “secretly taking photos is so fun” and “I get why people take hidden-camera shots." The post was met with hundreds of replies, most being abusive. Megalia members left harsh comments such as “He should close his legs since his dick is small," “I want to kick his dick," and “His lower body is weak,” along with other aggressive remarks. The post was captured and reposted on other online communities. Although there were claims that this was an eye-to-eye tactic to the voyeurisms against women, most said it was uncomfortable and disturbing to see. In a post titled “Hannam-chung (a derogatory term for Korean men) after erection 9.6 was real,” the poster publicly exposed an uncensored image of a man’s genitalia along with what appeared to be message exchanges between a man and a woman. They also incited users to leave comments on community posts and news articles, claiming that they were doing what they called 'bo-ryeok support' (a crude term referring to women’s genitals). There were also instances of profanity directed at the president.

Other controversies include when users of Megalia posted gory images of severed or severely damaged male genitalia, or when users publicized men's explicit photos without their consent.

== Dispute over homophobic slurs and end of Megalian.com ==
A major argument between Megalian.com users took place in December 2015 over the use of homophobic slurs. The most common was ttongkko ch'ung (lit. "butthole-bug"), a term originally used on DC Inside to insinuate that overly-enthusiastic fans of male sports stars were homosexually attracted to them. It was adopted by some Megalians to troll gay Korean men. Other incidents included the outing of gay men married to women by some Megalian.com users. After Megalian.com moderators banned the use of ttongkko ch'ung and other homophobic slurs, the majority of users left to join splinter forums elsewhere. The largest of these splinter forums was WOMAD, which became Megalian.com's de facto successor. Megalian.com shut down in 2017, and the Megalia 4 Facebook page stopped posting in 2018.

== Legacy ==
Megalia had a transformative impact on South Korean feminism. Both for critics and supporters of the movement, Megalia is considered "the emblem of South Korean popular feminism". At the end of 2016, almost half of Korean women in their twenties considered themselves feminist, and a quarter of them credited Megalia for turning them into feminists. However, the controversy associated with Megalia created negative associations with feminism in the minds of many South Koreans. Even some feminists in Korea today distance themselves from Megalia, calling themselves "feminists but not Megalians". Long after the movement went into decline, "Megalia" continued to be a shorthand in South Korean discourse for feminism, especially feminist beliefs or activists considered extreme. For example, in 2018 after two women reported they had been assaulted for not conforming to traditional standards of feminine appearance, 350,000 Koreans signed a petition asking police to prosecute the men who had assaulted them. When a YouTube video emerged showing the women taunting the men for their penis size, a counter-petition asked the police to prosecute the women because "there should be a different set of measures when dealing with women who belong to Megalia and WOMAD."

The hand gesture depicted in the Megalian.com logo was the inspiration for the finger pinching conspiracy theory. The theory claims that there is a conspiracy to promote misandry by subtly inserting the hand gesture into various media. In 2021, convenience store brand GS25 had to remove an image of a pinching hand reaching towards a sausage from its ad campaign after backlash from Koreans who thought it looked like the Megalian.com logo. In 2024, the Korean unit of Renault faced backlash when numerous videos on its corporate YouTube channel were alleged to show the finger-pinching hand gesture. Numerous news outlets, such as The Hankyoreh, The New York Times, and Korea JoongAng Daily have criticized the conspiracy theory as fictitious and as cover for antifeminist harassment.

== See also ==
- Radical feminism
  - Egalia's Daughters
  - Feminist views on sexuality
- Feminism in South Korea
  - Korean beauty standards
  - GamerGate
  - 4B movement
  - WOMAD
  - Finger pinching conspiracy theory
- Internet in South Korea
  - Internet activism in South Korea
  - DC Inside
  - Ilbe Storehouse

== Bibliography ==
- Kim, Jae-hui (June 23, 2015). 일베도 서럽게 만든, '메갈리아의 딸들' [Even Ilbe was made to feel contrition by the 'Megalia sisterhood']. OhmyNews (in Korean).
- Kim, Yeji (May 20, 2016a). 강남역 10번 출구에 간 '일베 화환'의 최후 [The End of a wreath of 'Ilbe' at Exit 10 of Gangnam Station]. Ohmynews (in Korean).
- Kim, Mark (July 29, 2016b). "South Korea Is Contending With A 'Gamergate' Of Its Own — Over A T-Shirt". NPR.
- Kim, Seo-yeong (July 8, 2016c). '메갈리아' 성향 따라 워마드·레디즘 등으로 분화 ['Megalia' splits off Womad and Ladism that are of a different flavor]. Kyunghyang Shinmun (in Korean).
- Kim, Donna Do-own (2020). "Mirroring the Misogynistic Wor(l)d: Civic Imagination and Speech Mirroring Strategy in Korea's Online Feminist Movement". In Jenkins, Henry; Peters-Lazaro, Gabriel; Shresthova, Sangita (eds.). Popular Culture and the Civic Imagination: Case Studies of Creative Social Change. New York: New York University Press.
- Kim, Youngmi (2021a). "Mirroring Misogyny in Hell Chosŏn: Megalia, Womad, and Korea's Feminism in the Age of Digital Populism" (PDF). European Journal of Korean Studies. 20 (2): 101–133. doi:10.33526/EJKS.20212002.101.
- Kim, Victoria (June 21, 2021b). "What's size got to do with it? Emoji mocking a man's manhood spurs backlash in South Korea". The Los Angeles Times.
- Kim, Sooah (2021c). "'이대남'과 반 페미니즘 담론: '메갈 손가락 기호' 논란을 중심으로" [Men in their Twenties Angry at Feminism: Discourse Analysis of “Megal and the Finger Controversy”] (PDF). Feminism and Korean Literature (in Korean). 53 (53). The Academic Socity of Feminism and Korean Literature: 443–475. doi:10.15686/fkl.2021..53.443. ISSN 1229-4632 – via Korea Institute of Science and Technology Information.
- Jung, Hawon (2023). Flowers of Fire: The Inside Story of South Korea's Feminist Movement and What It Means for Women' s Rights Worldwide. Dallas, TX: BenBella Books.
- Cheng, Sealing (February 2021). "The Male Malady of Globalization: Phallocentric Nationalism in South Korea". Current Anthropology. 62 (23): S79–S91. doi:10.1086/711664.
- Jeong, Euisol; Lee, Jieun (2018). "We take the red pill, we confront the DickTrix: online feminist activism and the augmentation of gendered realities in South Korea". Feminist Media Studies. 18 (4): 705–717. doi:10.1080/14680777.2018.1447354.
- Munawar, Aniqua (July 2019). "The Reversal of Sexist Language: Analysing Gerd Brantenberg's Egalia's Daughters". International Journal of English and Education. 8 (3).
- Steger, Isabella (October 23, 2016). "An epic battle between feminism and deep-seated misogyny is under way in South Korea". Quartz News.
- Cho, Eun-ae; Sohn, Guk-hee; Chung, Esther (April 8, 2016). "Korea's biggest porn site gets shut down". Korea JoongAng Daily. JoongAng Ilbo.
- Lee, Claire (November 18, 2018b). "'Isu station' assault case triggers online gender war in South Korea". Korea Herald.
- Lee, Claire (August 9, 2018a). "South Korean authorities face backlash over warrant for radical feminist site operator". The Korea Herald.
- "South Korea gaming: How a T-shirt cost an actress her job". BBC. August 15, 2016.
- Yoo, Seong-woon (August 3, 2016). "A social dispute causes Justice Party members to defect". Korea JoongAng Daily. JoongAng Ilbo.
- Kwon, Jake (October 2, 2021). "Why a hand gesture has South Korean companies on edge". CNN Business.
- Sussman, Anna Louise (March 24, 2023). "The Real Reason South Koreans Aren't Having Babies". The Atlantic.
- Yoon, Min-sik (August 4, 2023). "Gender conflict and new 'scarlet letter' ails South Korea". The Korea Herald.
- Fisher, Max (August 23, 2012). "Gangnam Style, Dissected: The Subversive Message Within South Korea's Music Video Sensation". The Atlantic.
- Rothman, Lauren (January 19, 2015). "Korean Women Are Starving Themselves to Afford a Cup of Coffee". Vice News.
- Seol, Seung-eun (May 22, 2016). 강남 묻지마 살인, 정신질환자 전형적 범죄…'女가 괴롭혀' 망상 [Motiveless murder in Gangnam, typical crimes of a mental patient... The delusion that women are bothering him.]. Yonhap News Agency.
- Lim, Jeong-yo (May 23, 2016). "Pink elephant's 'Zootopia' protest aggravates Gangnam murder controversy". The Korea Herald.
- Park, Hye-song (January 15, 2016a). 여성 인권' 외치던 '메갈리아'의 정체는?…"소라넷보다 더한 막장 사이트 [Real identity of Megalia who cries for women's rights? Site more extreme than SoraNet] (in Korean).
- Park, Se-hwan (May 21, 2016b). 강남역 살인사건 현장에 나타난 핑크코끼리 '논란' [Controversy over 'Pink Elephant' appearing at the site of a murder case in Gangnam Station]. Kukmin Ilbo (in Korean).
- Park, Su-ji (June 15, 2016c). "Web platform that advocates "hating misogynists" mounts lawsuit against Facebook". The Hankyoreh.
- Ku, Ja-yun (December 28, 2015). 메갈리안 유치원 교사 "어린이와 하고 싶다" 논란 [The Megalian kindergarten teacher's 'I want to do it with a child' controversy]. The Financial News (in Korean).
- Shinyun, Dong-uk (January 13, 2016). 어떤 입으로 말하고, 누구의 귀로 들을까? [Whose mouths, whose ears?]. The Hankyoreh (in Korean).
- Herald Economy (November 17, 2015). 범죄, 테러 악용 우려…실험용 염산 온라인판매 금지 [Concerns about abuse for crime and terrorism... Ban on online sales of experimental hydrochloric acid]. The Korea Herald (in Korean).
- Jeong, Euisol (2020). Troll Feminism: The Rise of Popular Feminism in South Korea (PhD thesis). University of York.
- Cho, HyeYoung (2024). "Intermedial Feminism: Megalia and Kangnam Station Exit 10". In Cho, Michelle; Song, Jesook (eds.). Mediating Gender in Post-Authoritarian South Korea (PDF). Translated by Kim, Aliju. Ann Arbor: University of Michigan Press. ISBN 978-0-472-90437-2.
- Brown, Lucien (2023). "The denigration of Korean men's genitals: Precision grip gestures and the multimodal construction of "taking offence" in media discourse surrounding anti-feminism in South Korea". Journal of Language Aggression and Conflict. 12 (2).
