= 2026 United States corporate mass layoffs =

2026 mass layoffs

Beginning in January 2026 dozens of Fortune 500 companies announced layoffs of tens of thousands of their corporate workers. Many companies cited advancement of artificial intelligence, and restructuring or down-sizing as a response to current market trends. Many analysts attribute the mass layoffs of corporate workers in 2026 to President Donald Trump's aggressive tariff and protectionist policies, companies hiring cheaper corporate workers through the H-1B visa program over domestic workers, and companies offshoring and outsourcing white-collar jobs overseas to countries where corporate workers work or will work remotely for significantly less than their US counterparts.
