= Media Today =

South Korean Korean-language newspaper

Media Today (Korean: 미디어오늘; RR: Midieo oneul) is a weekly Korean-language newspaper published in South Korea. It was launched on January 17, 1989, and is associated with the National Union of Media Workers (전국언론노동조합연맹). Its original name was 언론노보; lit. 'press workers' bulletin'. It changed its name to its present form on May 17, 1995.

The publication often comments critically on the South Korean press landscape, and has been known to publicly challenge or criticize the major newspapers of the country. It attempts to explain how the press industry works to the general public. It is owned by a union of its employees.

== History ==
Media Today originated from National Union of Mediaworkers, a journalist union founded in 1988. The union printed a newsletter named Eonronnobo since 17 January 1989. Eonronnobo drew criticism for being read only by journalists and thus limiting its audience. As an effort to reach wider demographic, Media Today was officially established on 17 May 1995 as a weekly newspaper.

On 2 February 2012, the Media Today union went on strike for the first time in history, in response to conflictsd between the media's editor-in-chiefs and union members. The strike came to an end four days later, when the company accepted the union's demand over establishing an appointment appointment committee for editor-in-chief.

In 2023, the Yongsan Presidential Office prohibited Media Today reporters from entering the office, with no response when questioned why. Media Today stated the office tried to silence the media that portrayed the government in a negative light.
