= Summary order =

In law, a summary order is a determination made by a court without issuing a legal opinion. This disposition is also known as a nonopinion, summary opinion, affirmance without opinion, unpublished order, disposition without opinion, or abbreviated disposition. It is not to be confused with summary judgment, which means a decision without trial.

== Affirmance without opinion ==
The judgment or order may be affirmed or enforced without opinion when the court determines that an opinion would have no precedential value and that any one or more of the following circumstances exists and is dispositive of a matter submitted for decision: (1) that a judgment of the district court is based on findings of fact that are not clearly erroneous; (2) that the evidence in support of a jury verdict is not insufficient; (3) that the order of an administrative agency is supported by substantial evidence on the record as a whole; (4) in the case of a summary judgment, that no genuine issue of material fact has been properly raised by the appellant; and (5) no reversible error of law appears. In such case, the court may, in its discretion, enter either of the following orders: "AFFIRMED. See 5th Cir. R. 47.6." or "ENFORCED. See 5th Cir. R. 47.6."

== See also ==
- Non-publication
