= Asian Women (journal) =

- Discipline: Asian studies, women's studies
- Language: English
- Edited by: Youngshin Kim

Publication details
- History: 1995–present
- Publisher: The Research Institute of Asian Women (Sookmyung Women's University) (Korea)
- Frequency: Quarterly
- Impact factor: 1.625 (2015)

Standard abbreviations
- ISO 4: Asian Women

Indexing
- ISSN: 1225-925X
- LCCN: 98657870
- OCLC no.: 36782501

Links
- Journal homepage

Asian Women is a quarterly peer-reviewed academic journal and the official journal of the Research Institute of Asian Women (Sookmyung Women's University). Its focus is recent gender issues and its editor-in-chief is Youngshin Kim.

== Abstracting and indexing ==
The journal is abstracted and indexed in:

- Social Sciences Citation Index
- Scopus

According to the Journal Citation Reports, the journal has a 2015 impact factor of 1.625, ranking it 5th out of 40 journals in the category "Women's Studies".

== See also ==
- List of women's studies journals
