= Internet activism in South Korea =

Internet activism in South Korea originated in 2002, when an Internet user named Angma proposed a candlelight vigil for two girls (Hyo-sun and Mi-sun) who were killed by a U.S. military vehicle in the Yangju highway incident. Angma's post circulated widely online, mobilizing ordinary people (especially Korean youth) to demand SOFA reform and an apology from President George W. Bush with peaceful candlelight protests in Kwanghwamun. Since then, the Internet has been a space for open discussion of sociopolitical issues and grassroots activism in South Korea. Other examples of Internet activism in Korea are the 2008 U.S. beef protest, anti-Chosunilbo protests, and online feminist and LGBTQ movements with hashtags (such as #MeToo).

According to Kookmin and Yeungnam University researchers Sujin Choi and Han Woo Park, the three stages of Internet activism are the organization of members in networks, the formation of a collective identity, and tactical actions (petitions and letter-writing) which mobilize people in on- and offline movements. The effectiveness of Internet activism is debated, and some argue that online political participation lacks meaningful effort. Internet activism, however, has opened doors for victims of sexual assault, empowered youth to demand justice and responsibility from the Korean government, and played a role in collective action.

== Historical context ==
South Korea is known for its high-speed Internet and advanced IT infrastructure. With the development of Korea’s information infrastructure and growth of the broadband market in the mid-1990s, Internet usage increased dramatically. By 2002, 57.4 percent of Koreans had a high-speed Internet connection; this percentage grew steadily, reaching 95.1 percent in 2017.

In the early 21st century, the internet began playing a transformative role in South Korea's activist landscape. It has become an accessible, multi-route medium through which users communicate, share opinions and create content, facilitating political participation for many (especially Korean youth). From the late 1990s to the early 2000s, Korean children and teenagers between the ages of seven and 19 had the highest Internet penetration rate; this was followed by people in their twenties and thirties. This phenomenon represented a significant shift from pre-Internet public discourse, which was dominated by older people.

Before the political liberalization of the late 1980s, the Korean government under Park Chung-hee and Chun Doo-hwan strictly censored the press and media to suppress anti-regime rhetoric. The Korean government now exercises minimal Internet censorship, allowing extensive freedom of expression; as a result, Koreans can post and circulate politically-sensitive messages on the Internet without fear of persecution and build online communities as part of political movements. During the 2002 presidential election, Korean youth utilized the Internet to discuss political issues and support (and criticize) government leaders. The Internet has become a potent tool for grassroots activism in South Korea, facilitating the on- and offline mobilization of citizens who want to shape the political landscape and providing a social space for voicing opinions and forging alliances.

== Examples ==
=== 2002 candlelight vigils ===
... The 2002 vigils offered a significant opportunity for the netizen movement to diverge from institutionalized social movements, representing a new wave of civic activism by non-institutionalized, networked individuals.

— Hee-Yeon Cho, Hŭi-yŏn Cho, Lawrence Surendra, and Hyo-je Cho, Contemporary South Korean Society: A Critical Perspective (2013)

On June 13, 2002, Shin Hyo-soon and Shim Mi-sun were killed by U.S. military vehicles in what became known as the Yangju highway incident. Under the U.S.-South Korea status of forces agreement (SOFA), the indicted American servicemen were tried in a U.S. court-martial in Korea and acquitted of negligent homicide.

The acquittal enraged many South Koreans, spurring anti-American sentiment across the nation. As more people learned about the incident through the Internet, they engaged in online discourse which sparked protests demanding SOFA reform and justice for the victims. Funeral photographs of the two girls circulated widely on the Internet and were placed on the main pages of online communities such as Ko Sin Hyo-sun Sim Mi-son Yang Ch'umo Moim, generating disbelief, grief and anger in community members. Users displayed their collective identity as mourners and protestors, questioning the existing legal framework through usernames, ideograms, and commemorative letters dedicated to the deceased. Other online postings expressed strong anti-American sentiment (such as "The American GIs committed such a brutal crime without guilt. The U.S. is so arrogant" and "Koreans should unify and expel the American troops from Korea. We should boycott McDonald's and Burger King, too"), exemplifying Koreans' attempt to hold the U.S. accountable for the tragedy and free themselves from the U.S. military presence.

On November 30, 2002, an anonymous citizen reporter for OhmyNews with the nickname "Angma" proposed holding peaceful candlelight vigils for the two girls in Kwanghwa-moon Square. Angma's message spread quickly throughout the Internet, as Korean netizens forwarded the suggestion on website bulletin boards and forums. The online exchange of shared grievances and anger was soon carried offline to Korea's first candlelight vigil, the Misun-Hyosun vigil, where over 10,000 people gathered to memorialize the girls and peacefully demand a public apology from President George W. Bush and reform of SOFA to establish an equal relationship between South Korea and the U.S. Between November 2002 and June 2004, 422 candlelight vigils were held. The 2002 candlelight vigils were a pivotal event in the history of Internet activism in south Korea, demonstrating the power of the Internet to spread information and gather participants in on- and offline activism.

=== 2008 U.S. beef protest ===
In April 2008, when newly-elected president Lee Myung-bak and his administration resumed beef importation from the U.S. under the United States–Korea Free Trade Agreement despite growing public fear of mad cow disease, a netizen known as "Andante" posted a petition to impeach the president on the Agora online bulletin board on Daum.net (Korea’s largest web portal). The petition received over 1.3 million signatures in two weeks.

Agora users also proposed a candlelight festival to protest the beef-import agreement and demand Lee’s impeachment, mobilizing 15,000 participants at the first gathering on May 2, 2008. The street protests were characterized by increased participation by teenagers under the voting age of 19. When the government announced that it would crack down on the protest organizers, Internet users forged alliances and began the Campaign for Ten Million Arrests by mass-posting on the National Police Agency bulletin board. Lee apologized on May 22, 20 days after the first demonstration. Public discontent continued as the beef-import issue remained unresolved, however, and the candlelight demonstrations persisted.

Young people were at the center of the Internet-born protests, transforming social movements through what author Jiyeon Kang calls "new democratic sensibilities". Korean youth in the post-authoritarian and neo-liberal era found casual political participation possible in cyberspace; because they grew up during the early expansion of Internet culture in Korea, they were technologically knowledgeable and accustomed to expressing opinions online. On Facebook, Myspace and popular portals such as Daum and Naver.com, youth constructed a collective identity and increased pressure on the government to keep their school lunches safe.

=== 2010 anti-Chosun Ilbo protest ===
The Twitter-based online community Chopae, was launched on May 11, 2010 to demand the closure of The Chosun Ilbo, a conservative newspaper; within half a year, 700 members had joined. The anti-Chosun Ilbo protest was rooted in the alternative media movement of the late 1990s and early 2000s, which was led by progressive groups who sought to challenge conservative media with online citizen journalism; OhmyNews is an example of a progressive online newspaper.

Chopae was organized by a Twitter user known as @parknife (a previous supporter of President Roh Moo-hyun), who shared news and content in the online community with tweets criticizing the G20, Lee Myung-bak’s administration, conservative daily newspapers and Samsung with hashtags such as #chopaegongsa, #weapon and #change of government. Chopae members retweeted these messages and posted an online banner calling for a boycott of South Korea's three major national conservative newspapers (Chosun Ilbo, JoongAng Ilbo and The Dong-a Ilbo) and Samsung. Many tweets contained hyperlinks which led to more anti-Chosun Ilbo content. Chopae also engaged in culture jamming, circulating caricatures, satirical novels about Lee and parody videos. These online activities were accompanied by offline meetings which encouraged the solidification of Chopae identity.

== Online feminist movements ==
Korean women have used the Internet to engage in feminist discourse since the 1990s, especially through female-dominated online communities where they "gained a sense of belonging ... through their conversations with strangers who emotionally supported, assisted, and comforted them, and took these collectives of women as reliable interlocutors to share information and knowledge". For young girls participating in South Korea's new feminist movements, the main objectives are dealing with urgent issues which directly impact them (such as gender violence) and voicing their demand for gender equality. Furthermore, compared with the pre-democratization era, the new generation of activists is not limited to university students; it also includes teenagers and women from a variety of backgrounds who have united under a feminist agenda. Online feminist groups primarily recruit protest participants in feminist Internet cafés and disseminate information on Twitter and Facebook with hashtags. On- and offline activism are connected, with protestors using specific words and phrases (such as "uncomfortable courage") which are search terms on Twitter to increase exposure of the movement.

=== #MeToo ===
Prosecutor Suh Ji-Hyeon spoke on live television about personal experiences of sexual harassment in 2008, increasing visibility for victims of sexual assault and sparking the #MeToo movement in South Korea. Suh was followed by a number of others who felt empowered to go public with their own stories, drawing more media attention and galvanizing young girls and women to participate in hashtag activism. The movement quickly gained momentum and expanded to the use of the hashtag #MeToo across the Internet and a series of protests, which led to legal and organizational reforms to address sexual violence.

Students at over 65 South Korean schools spoke out in 2018 about sexual abuse by teachers using the hashtag #SchoolMeToo, identifying fundamental problems in the education system and building solidarity among victims. Although the movement led to criminal investigations at some schools, few of the accused teachers were charged due to lack of evidence.

=== Radical feminism ===
What distinguishes megalian activism from other forms of peer-group feminist empowerment are the unique experiences of activists. For them, the web is not only a medium to transfer feminist messages, but also the source of inspiration, the matrix of its growth, and its battleground, which has shaped the movement differently from more general peer-group feminist empowerment.

— Euisol Jeong and Jieun Lee, "We take the red pill, we confront the DickTrix: online feminist activism and the augmentation of gendered realities in South Korea", Feminist Media Studies (2018)

Megalia, an online radical-feminist group, emerged in May 2015 to oppose online misogynistic culture and mirror its male perpetrators of targeted violence against, and objectification of, women by ridiculing their content and writing style. The movement began during the Middle East respiratory syndrome (MERS) epidemic, when female Internet users uploaded parody posts blaming Korean men for the epidemic to a MERS discussion board. As their posts spread across women’s online communities, other young women joined their fight against online misogyny and created the Megalia website. The Megalia movement focused on criticizing state patriarchy and advocating for the eradication of non-consensual digital pornography with strategies including "trolling, linguistic violence, parodies of misogynistic discourse, and flaming." In a Megalia post entitled "Misogyny That Has Infiltrated [Korea] Like Air", its author discusses the pervasiveness of misogyny in South Korea and uses a derogatory term to refer to misogynistic Korean men.

== Online LGBTQ movement ==
In Korea, online activism in support of legislative reform to prohibit discrimination against individuals based on sexual orientation has faced opposition from conservatives and Christian organizations. Without access to traditional media (and its public profile), many Korean LGBTQ groups have struggled to obtain sufficient publicity for their campaigns and generate discussion by the general public. Conservative Christian groups have extensive access to traditional media (such as Christian newspapers and television broadcasts) and Internet outlets, including blogs and online communities. Online Christian communities which campaign against the anti-discrimination law include the Anti-Homosexual Citizens’ Action Headquarters and The Truth About Homosexuality.

The Internet was a forum for discussion of the 2010 Korean television series Life is Beautiful, about a gay couple and the difficulties they face in coming out to their families. Shortly after it was aired, there was an increase in online discussion of same-sex relationships on Twitter and the Seoul Broadcasting System’s online message board. A tweet by gay Korean gay celebrity Hong Seok-cheon, who criticized an anti-gay advertisement in The Chosun Ilbo in response to the series, went viral and inspired a number of bloggers and Twitter users to support the LGBTQ community.

== Effectiveness ==
The effectiveness of Internet activism is debated by scholars. Some studies have found that the Internet helps mobilize ordinary citizens for political activism and form collective identities, providing a space for open discussion of socio-political issues. The 2002 candlelight vigils are examples of the extension of online activism to street politics. Research also indicates that the rise of social networking services and video broadcasting websites (such as YouTube) have contributed to a decline in the level of repressive violence at protests.

Other scholars are more skeptical about the effectiveness of the Internet in bringing real change to government policies; online LGBTQ activists, in particular, have made little progress in reforming legal institutions due to their lack of access to traditional media. Internet youth activism is perceived by some scholars as ephemeral and episodic, with no solid goals or organization, and the term "slacktivism" has been coined to criticize the lack of effort and engagement of online activism.

== See also ==
- Internet activism
- Feminism in South Korea
- LGBT rights in South Korea
