= Jocelyne Couture-Nowak =

Instructor in Quebec, Canada

- Born: Jocelyne Maryanne Couture; February 17, 1958; Grand-Mère, Quebec, Canada
- Died: April 16, 2007 (aged 49); Blacksburg, Virginia, U.S.
- Cause of death: Gunshot wounds
- Education: Nova Scotia Teachers College (Truro), Saint Mary's University (Halifax)
- Scientific career
- Fields: French language
- Workplaces: Nova Scotia Agricultural College, Virginia Tech

Jocelyne Maryanne Couture-Nowak (February 17, 1958 – April 16, 2007) was a Canadian instructor of French in the Department of Foreign Languages and Literature at Virginia Tech in Blacksburg, Virginia and was the only Canadian victim of the Virginia Tech shooting. While residing in Truro, Nova Scotia, she co-founded the first Francophone school in the region.

== Life and career ==
Born in Grand-Mère, Quebec, she was raised in Yarmouth, Nova Scotia, the eldest of five children. She graduated from Yarmouth Consolidated Memorial High School in 1981.

Couture initially worked at a newly opened daycare operated by the Yarmouth Boys and Girls Club. She began to pursue her teaching career at the Nova Scotia Teachers College in Truro. She graduated in 1989 then obtained a degree from St. Mary's University in Halifax in the early 1990s. While living in Truro, Couture worked as a French instructor in the Humanities Department at Nova Scotia Agricultural College (NSAC). She married Jerzy Nowak, an instructor in the Horticulture Department at NSAC. Couture-Nowak had two daughters, Sylvie and Francine.

With two other local Francophone parents, Couture-Nowak established the École acadienne de Truro, the first French-language public school in central Nova Scotia in September 1997. Operated by the Conseil scolaire acadien provincial, the École acadienne de Truro has grown from 36 students in 1997 to 118 students in grades Primary through 10. The school's first class of seniors graduated in 2006.

In 2001, Couture-Nowak and her husband moved their family to Blacksburg, Virginia, where her husband had accepted a position as Professor and Head of the Department of Horticulture at Virginia Tech. Couture-Nowak accepted a position as an instructor of French in the Department of Foreign Languages and Literature. Throughout her life Couture-Nowak described herself as being a proud French-Canadian.

== Death ==
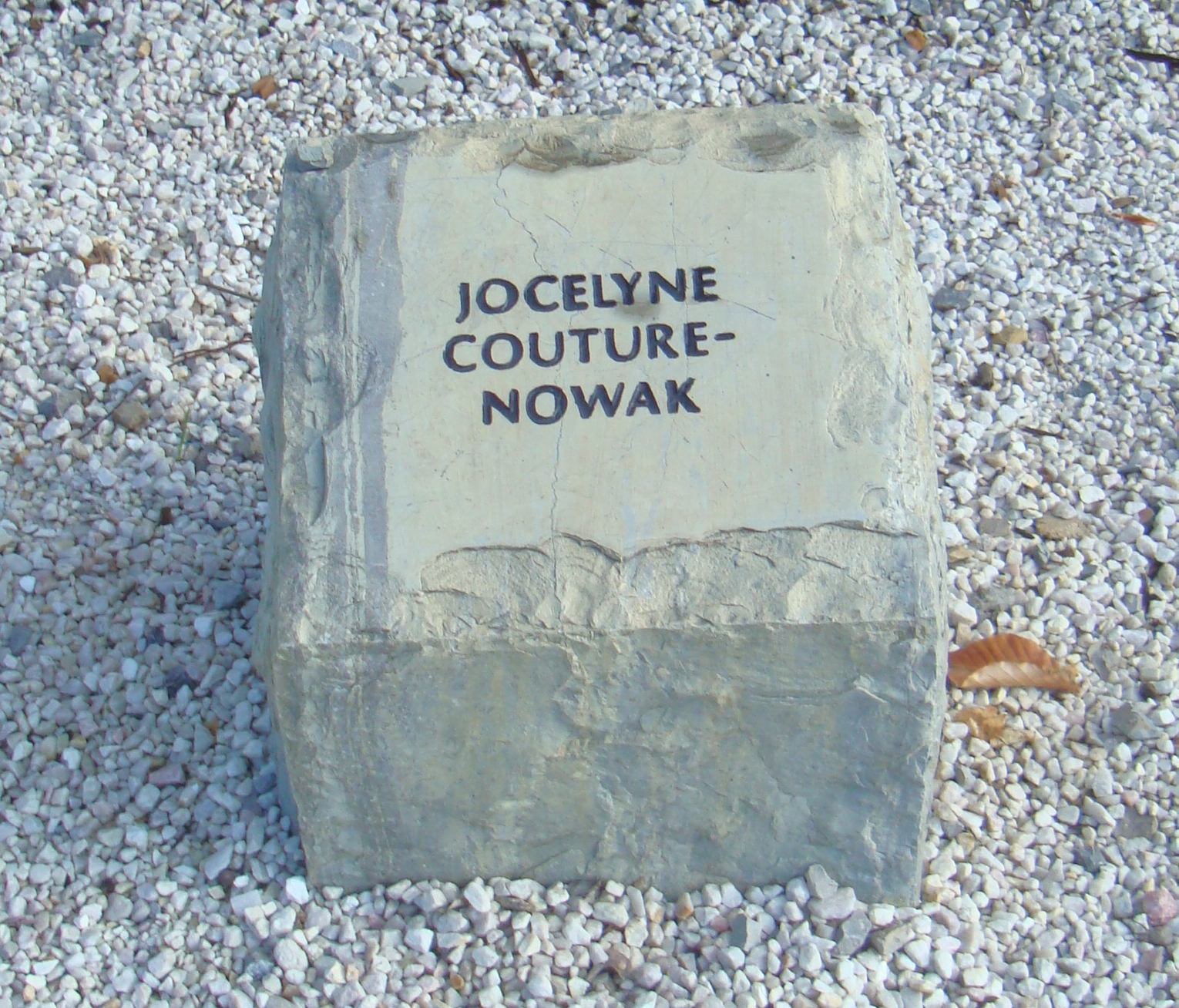
Nowak's memorial stone on the Virginia Tech campus

Couture-Nowak was teaching an Intermediate French class in Room 211 at Norris Hall on the morning of April 16, 2007 when she was killed by Seung-Hui Cho as one of the 32 victims in the Virginia Tech shooting. Couture-Nowak, one of the first to be shot in Norris 211, was 49 years old when she died.

Upon hearing gunfire nearby, the students in her room thought it was construction going on outside. After hearing much louder banging, she realized it was coming from the hallway and not from outside. Just before Cho arrived at Norris 211, Couture-Nowak peered outside the doorway and looked just in time to see the gunman shoot at two other professors (Kevin Granata and Wally Grant) before slamming the door shut and attempting to barricade it with the help of a student (Henry Lee) by pushing desks and chairs in front of the entrance while informing her students to get down under their desks or to the back of the room and call 911. However, the attempt at barricading the door was unsuccessful and Cho nudged his way into the room. Couture-Nowak died in front of the door, and 11 of the 22 registered students died.

== Posthumous recognition ==
The Senate of Canada observed one minute of silence in tribute to Ms. Jocelyne Couture-Nowak. In Nova Scotia, more than 400 people attended a commemorative service for her.

In speeches given in the Canadian parliament shortly after the shooting, Canadian Prime Minister Stephen Harper and Opposition leader Stéphane Dion made special mention of Couture-Nowak. Nova Scotian Premier Rodney MacDonald also made special mention of Couture-Nowak, and in particular spoke of her contribution to the francophone community with her key role in the development of École acadienne in Truro.

Couture-Nowak was discussed, along with Liviu Librescu, as potentially becoming the "iconic image that will forever recall the massacre at Virginia Tech" by CBC News Editor-in-Chief Tony Burman.

Virginia Tech named her an Honorary Distinguished Instructor and the Virginia Tech Foundation established the Jocelyne Couture-Nowak Scholarship, awarded to French majors annually. Nova Scotia Agricultural College also established a bursary in her name.

Students at Virginia Tech have also organized a new foreign language program named Teach for Madame in honor of Couture-Nowak, wherein members teach French to elementary school students.

Jocelyne Couture-Nowak was remembered by her former French students that she taught at the all girls boarding school, Chatham Hall located in Chatham, Virginia by a candlelight vigil.

In May 2008, Virginia Tech named Couture-Nowak's widower, Jerzy Nowak, as the founding director of its newly created Center for Peace Studies and Violence Prevention. He served as its director for three years, until his retirement from the university.
