= Depue =

Depue or DePue may refer to:

== Places ==
- DePue, Illinois, a village in Bureau County
- Depue, West Virginia, an unincorporated community in Roane County

== Other ==
- David A. Depue (1826–1902), Justice of the Supreme Court of New Jersey
- Roger Depue (fl. 1970s–2000s), a veteran of the Federal Bureau of Investigation (FBI)
