= Ryan Cook (musician) =

Canadian singer

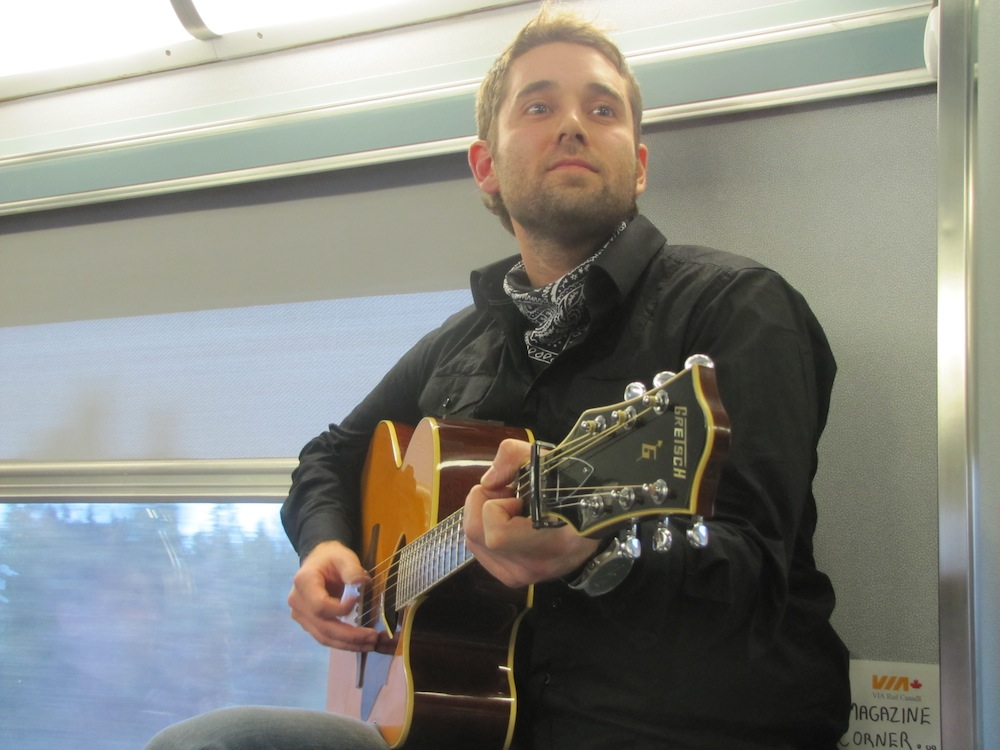
- Cook performing onboard "The Canadian" en route from Toronto to Edmonton, April 2011

Background information
- Born: April 3, 1981 (age 43)
- Origin: Yarmouth, Nova Scotia, Canada
- Genres: Country
- Occupation(s): Singer-songwriter, musician
- Instrument(s): Vocals, guitar
- Years active: 2007–present
- Labels: No Scene Records, Independent
- Website: www.ryancook.ca

Ryan Cook (born April 3, 1981) is a singer-songwriter from Nova Scotia, Canada. He has released four studio albums, three of which have been nominated for the Music Nova Scotia Awards "Album of the Year".

== Early life ==
Cook grew up on a dairy farm in Yarmouth County, Nova Scotia, the eldest of four children. In high school Cook wrote and sang for local punk rock and heavy metal garage bands. He graduated from Yarmouth Consolidated Memorial High School in 2000. While in college, he worked part-time at a retirement home and began taking requests to perform traditional country music. He developed a passion for the genre which led him to pursue a career in folk and country music.

== Career ==
=== 2008–2009: Hot Times ===
In 2008, Cook recorded with his then touring band, Sunny Acres, and released his debut LP Hot Times. The record won a Music Nova Scotia Country/Bluegrass Recording of the Year award, was nominated for an East Coast Music award, and named the eighth Best Canadian Country Album of 2008 by Country Music News.

=== 2009–2011: Peaks and Valleys ===
In 2009, while performing at the CMA Music Festival in Nashville, Tennessee, Cook met John Walker, a producer for Music City Roots. The two established a partnership which brought many Nashville musicians together to record at Quad Studios. The album features Lloyd Green, Andy Leftwich, Guthrie Trapp, Bruce Bouton, and Alison Brown. The album received and won award nominations including Best Canadian Country Album of 2010 by Country Music News (Canada) beating some of Canada's most recognized country artists such as Gord Bamford, Johnny Reid, Deric Ruttan, Carolyn Dawn Johnson, and Dean Brody.

=== 2011-2014: Wrestling with Demons, solo career ===
In 2011 Cook began performing as a solo entertainer and toured as the opening act for country music artists such as Sammy Kershaw, Travis Tritt, Dwight Yoakam, and Rosanne Cash. In 2013 Cook released a third album, Wrestling with Demons, which featured former members of Hank Snow's touring band The Rainbow Ranch Boys. The album was produced in Canada and also featured Canadian guitarist/fiddler J. P. Cormier. Wrestling with Demons was nominated at the ECMA and Music Nova Scotia awards in 2013 and won an award for Country Album of the Year.

=== 2017: Having A Great Time ===
On November 3, 2017 Cook released this fourth studio album, Having A Great Time, with award-winning producer Charles Austin (Rita MacNeil, Jerry Granelli, Joel Plaskett) at New Scotland Yard in Dartmouth, Nova Scotia.

== Discography ==
=== Studio albums ===
Title	Album details
Hot Times (as Ryan Cook & Sunny Acres)	Release date: February 29, 2008; Label: No Scene Records; Formats: CD, music download
Peaks & Valleys	Release date: October 28, 2010; Label: Independent; Formats: CD, music download
Wrestling with Demons	Release date: February 28, 2013; Label: Independent; Formats: CD, music download
Having A Great Time	Release date: November 3, 2017; Label: Independent; Formats: CD, music download

== Awards ==
=== Music Nova Scotia Awards ===
Music Nova Scotia Awards is an annual awards ceremony established in 1997 as part of the Molson Canadian Nova Scotia Music Week.

Year	Nominee / work	Award	Result
2007	Sunny Acres EP	New Artist/Group Recording	Nominated
2007	Sunny Acres EP	Country/Bluegrass Recording	Nominated
2008	Hot Times LP	New Artist/Group Recording	Nominated
2008	Hot Times LP	Country/Bluegrass Recording	Won
2009	Hot Times LP	Digital Artist	Nominated
2009	Hot Times LP	Male Artist	Nominated
2011	Peaks & Valleys LP	Album	Nominated
2011	Peaks & Valleys LP	Male Artist	Nominated
2011	Peaks & Valleys LP	Country/Bluegrass Recording	Won
2011	Gaspereau Valley	SOCAN Song of the Year	Nominated
2013	Ryan Cook	Entertainer of the Year	Nominated
2013	Wrestling with Demons	Album	Nominated
2013	Wrestling with Demons	Country/Bluegrass Recording	Won
2018	Having A Great Time	Country Recording	Won

=== East Coast Music Awards ===
The East Coast Music Association is a non-profit association that hosts an annual awards ceremony based in Atlantic Canada for music appreciation on the East Coast of Canada.

Year	Nominee / work	Award	Result
2009	Hot Times LP	Country Recording	Nominated
2011	Peaks & Valleys LP	Country Recording	Nominated
2011	Peaks & Valleys LP	Rising Artist	Nominated
2011	Peaks & Valleys LP	Digital Artist	Nominated
2013	Wrestling with Demons LP	Country Recording	Nominated
2019	Having a Great Time LP	Country Recording	Nominated

=== Other awards ===
2011 Canadian Country Album of the year, Peaks & Valleys - Country Music News
