= Yarmouth High School =

Yarmouth High School may refer to more than one high school:

== In Canada ==
- Yarmouth Consolidated Memorial High School located in Yarmouth, Nova Scotia.

== In the United Kingdom ==
- Great Yarmouth High School located in Great Yarmouth

== In the United States ==
- Yarmouth High School (Maine) in Yarmouth, Maine
- Dennis-Yarmouth Regional High School located in South Yarmouth, Massachusetts.
