= Kevin Granata =

Victim of the 2007 Virginia Tech shooting

- Born: Kevin Patrick Granata; December 29, 1961; Toledo, Ohio, U.S.
- Died: April 16, 2007 (aged 45); Blacksburg, Virginia, U.S.
- Cause of death: Gunshot wounds
- Education: Ohio State University; Purdue University
- Known for: Robotics and mobility expertise Cerebral palsy research
- Scientific career
- Fields: Mechanical engineering Orthopedic surgery
- Workplaces: Virginia Tech; Wake Forest University; University of Virginia

Kevin Patrick Granata (December 29, 1961 – April 16, 2007) was an American professor in multiple departments including the Departments of Engineering, Science and Mechanics (in which he was tenured) and Mechanical Engineering at Virginia Polytechnic Institute and State University (Virginia Tech), in Blacksburg, Virginia. Granata held an additional academic appointment as a professor in the Virginia Tech-Wake Forest School of Biomedical Engineering and was an adjunct professor at the University of Virginia in the Department of Orthopedic Surgery.

During the Virginia Tech shooting, Granata shepherded students into his office in order to safeguard them. He was then killed by Seung-Hui Cho after he went to investigate and intervene.

== Education and career ==
A native of Toledo, Ohio, Granata attended St. Francis de Sales High School in Toledo, where he played football and served on the debate team for four years, graduating in 1980 with a 4.0 GPA. He was awarded a bachelor's degree in engineering physics and electrical engineering from Ohio State University in 1984, a master's degree in physics from Purdue University in 1986, and a doctorate in biomechanics from Ohio State in 1993. He began his bachelor's degree in physics at John Carroll University in Cleveland, where he also played football, before transferring to Ohio State to finish the degree.

After earning his master's degree from Purdue, Granata worked for three years as a research scientist in the Applied Physics Lab at Johns Hopkins University. While there, he was contracted by the military and conducted research for the US Navy.

He stayed at Ohio State for four years as a research scientist in the Biodynamics Laboratory after earning his doctorate degree there in 1993.

In 1997, Granata arrived at the University of Virginia as an assistant professor in two departments, Orthopedics and Biomedical Engineering, where he published two journals and collaborated on a study with the Curry School of Education to determine why female athletes experience more knee injuries than their male counterparts. From 1997 to 2003, he also served as the research director of the Motion Analysis Laboratory at Virginia. In 2002, he was promoted to the position of associate professor for the orthopedics and biomedical engineering departments. While at Virginia, he worked at the university's Kluge Children's Rehabilitation Center with children who had cerebral palsy.

He remained an adjunct professor at Virginia after leaving for Virginia Tech in 2003.

== Virginia Tech ==
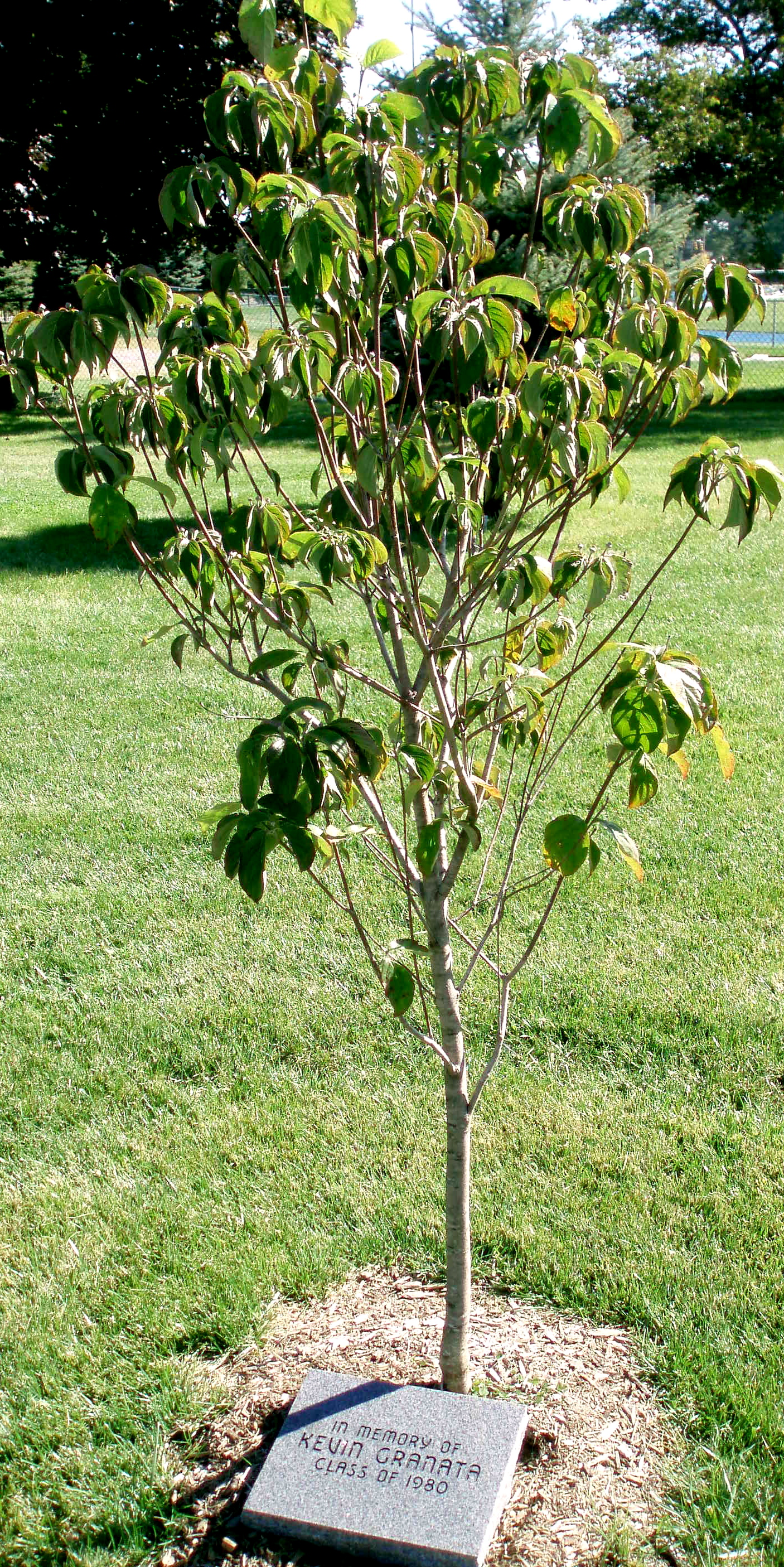
A tree on the St. Francis de Sales High School campus, planted in memory of Granata, who was a graduate of the school

Granata was among the leading U.S. researchers on biomechanics and movement dynamics in cerebral palsy, in his work with the Musculoskeletal Biomechanics Laboratory at Virginia Tech. His research focused on muscle and reflex control and its relation to legged robotics, neuromuscular control of musculoskeletal movement, biomechanical stability and muscle dynamics, control of low-back pain, and computer simulation and clinical interpretation of pathologic walking and running. Granata was recruited to the Department of Engineering Science and Mechanics to continue his teaching and research. He developed innovative methods to quantify low back stability that are considered cutting-edge by other leaders in the field.

He served as mentor for many students and junior professors. When he was promoted to the rank of professor, one of these professors said, "Countless times he has provided me with valuable guidance on research-related matters such as student advising, experimental issues, and manuscript preparation."

Darin Padua of the University of North Carolina at Chapel Hill, who earned his doctorate under Granata's tutelage at the University of Virginia, said that Granata particularly excelled at encouraging collaboration among experts in various fields, resulting in research that crossed many disciplines and areas of expertise.

While focusing primarily on research into cerebral palsy, biomimetric robotics and biomechanics, Granata helped develop mobility aids for the elderly such as the MARC Robotic Walker. The MARC Walker is named for the Medical Automation Research Center at the University of Virginia, where Granata had taught until January 10, 2003. He presented a paper on the elderly walker at the 2003 International Conference on Robots and Systems in Las Vegas.

In 2005, Granata was named a Virginia Tech College of Engineering Faculty fellow. In 2006, he was given the Dean's Award for Excellence in Research for his work on lower back pain. In announcing the Dean's Award given to Granata, Virginia Tech stated he had "established a major research program, developing innovative methods to quantify low back stability that are considered cutting edge." He was additionally honored as the Virginia Tech Scholar of the Week for his published work concerning lower back pain. His friends and colleagues at Virginia Tech called him "a man with a sharp intellect who answered a call to serve the cause of scholarship and higher education".

Granata was a member of many professional societies and served as associate editor of the Journal of Applied Biomechanics and Journal of Electromyography & Kinesiology. He was a co-chair of the American Society of Biomechanics' annual meeting in 2006, hosted at Virginia Tech.

At the time of his death, he was awaiting publication of four more articles in his name.

== Personal life ==
Granata lived in Blacksburg with his wife, Linda Ankenman, whom he met at Purdue while they both participated in the Crew Club; they married in May 1991. She is a research specialist in the Food Science Department at Virginia Tech.

Granata enjoyed working with the Boy Scouts and other activities with his three children.

He was an avid athlete, participating in triathlons and biathlons for years. On the crew club at Purdue, he was on the JV rowing team that won a bronze medal at the Dad Vail Regatta in 1986. He loved to play golf and was a fan of Ohio State athletics.

Granata was also a member of Triangle Fraternity at Ohio State.

== Death ==
Granata was a victim of the Virginia Tech shooting on April 16, 2007. Upon hearing from a professor from across the hall from his office on the third floor of Norris Hall that there were potential shootings going on on the second floor, he brought the professor and his 20 students from a nearby classroom into his office, where the door could be locked. He and another professor, Wally Grant, then went downstairs to investigate the situation when they were both shot by Seung-Hui Cho; Grant was wounded and survived from a shoulder injury, but Granata died from an injury to his temple. He was 45 years old. Neither the professor or any of the students locked in Granata's office were injured or killed.

One of Granata's fellow Virginia Tech engineering professors, Dr. Liviu Librescu, was also killed in the shootings. The Engineering Science and Mechanics Department head, Dr. Ishwar Puri, remembered Granata and Librescu in a statement as "world-class" researchers. Puri stated about Granata, "The use of his research by other scholars worldwide had put him on a trajectory to become a notable star in these fields."

Memorial services were held in Blacksburg. A funeral Mass at Christ the King Church in Toledo, Ohio, where his parents, Joseph and Mildred, and siblings live, was later held.
