= Yarmouth Consolidated Memorial High School =

Coordinates: 43.8372°N 66.1125°W

Location
- 146 Forest Street; Yarmouth, Nova Scotia; Canada

Information
- Type: Senior High School
- Motto: "Altiora Peto" ("Seek The Heights")
- Established: 1898
- Grades: 9-12
- Enrollment: 700
- Colors: Maroon and Grey
- Mascot: Viking
- Website: ycmhs.ednet.ns.ca

Yarmouth Consolidated Memorial High School (YCMHS) is a secondary school located in Yarmouth, Nova Scotia, Canada. It is part of the Tri-County Regional School Board and is the only high school in the town of Yarmouth. The high school serves the town of Yarmouth as well as the rest of Yarmouth County.

== History ==
At a public meeting held in the evening of July 26, 1898, the building was purchased for $8000 by the School Commission to be used as the Yarmouth County Academy. It is a memorial school dedicated to the war dead of Yarmouth Town and County during the First and Second World Wars. On February 20, 1949, the academy was totally destroyed by fire. As the news spread, many students, new and old, gathered in horror to watch it burn to the ground. The fire lead way for a new high school which was built in 1951. In September 2012, the new high school on Forest Street opened to replace the aging 1951 building.

== Notable alumni ==
- Brian Borcherdt, alternative country artist
- Ryan Cook, country music artist
- Jocelyne Couture-Nowak, victim of the Virginia Tech Massacre
- David Morse, politician
- Jody Shelley, National Hockey League Player
- Zach Churchill, MLA for Yarmouth, NS Minister of Education
- Nick Hilton, MLA for Yarmouth, NS Minister of Education
