= Roger Depue =

FBI agent (born 1938)

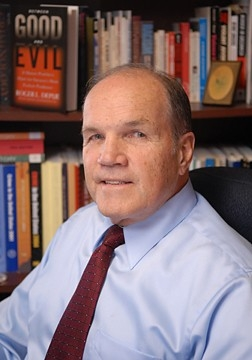
- Depue c. 2006
- Born: 1938 (age 86–87); Detroit, Michigan, U.S.
- Occupation(s): FBI agent, author

Roger L. Depue (born 1938) is a criminal profiler. Following a career in the FBI, he served on the panel investigating the Virginia Tech shooting and its handling by the university. Depue is the coauthor of Between Good and Evil: A Master Profiler's Hunt for Society's Most Violent Predators.

== Early life ==
Roger Depue was born in Detroit, Michigan, in February 1938. Depue, is one of five sons of police officer Alvoy Depue.

== Career ==
He worked for the FBI, where he served as Unit Chief for the Behavioral Science Unit at the FBI Academy at Quantico, Virginia. He was a pioneer of the FBI's Behavior Science Unit. Depue was first assigned as a Supervisory Special Agent in 1974. He served as an instructor and researcher until his promotion to the position of Chief of Behavioral Sciences in 1980.

He retired from the FBI in 1989 and founded The Academy Group, Inc (AGI).

He coauthored Between Good and Evil with Susan Schindehette.

Regarding his work with violent predators, Depue said:

Understanding the fantasy is very important. Many times in crime scene you can see fantasy. Many times the criminals with intense fantasies will draw victimizations. In prison and criminological research you will find all kinds of drawings where the fantasy is still alive.

This led him to coin the term "leakage", which basically means that people's fantasies tend to leak into behavior. This insight allows profilers to better understand criminal motivation.

=== Cases ===
One of Dupue's most important contributions involved the cold case of Terri Brooks. She was an assistant manager at a Roy Rogers in Bucks County, Pennsylvania. She was found murdered with her head wrapped in a trash bag and a knife in her back. Money was missing, and as a result, the detectives ruled it a robbery that went bad. Terri's fiancé James Keefe was interviewed, but not interrogated. Depue became involved years later, and the memory of it haunted him. He applied profiling techniques and interviewed the fiancé. This convinced Depue that Keefe was the main suspect. Law enforcement officials were complacent and did not follow up on Depue's finding. This caused him angst as he was retired from official law enforcement. Years later, Chief Arnold Conoline of Falls Township reopened the case. With DNA evidence, Officer Nelson E. Whitney II got a signed confession from the fiancé.

Another important case was that of James Joseph Richardson. Even though Richardson was viewed as a victim of injustice, Depue disagreed and made a compelling argument as to why he was guilty of killing his seven children.

== Personal life ==
Depue's wife died of cervical cancer. He then joined a seminary in an attempt to cope with his despair. This eventually led him to transform his work into preventing rather than solving crime.

== Sources and further reading ==
- Depue, Roger L.; Schindehette, Susan (February 1, 2005). Between Good and Evil: A Master Profiler's Hunt for Society's Most Violent Predators. Grand Central Publishing. ISBN 978-0-7595-1327-3.
- Chasing the Dragon: A Conversation with the Academy Group. (Interview with Roger Depue), Millennium TV series Fox DVD documentary, 2004.
