= Virginia Tech shooting =

2007 mass shooting in Blacksburg, Virginia, US

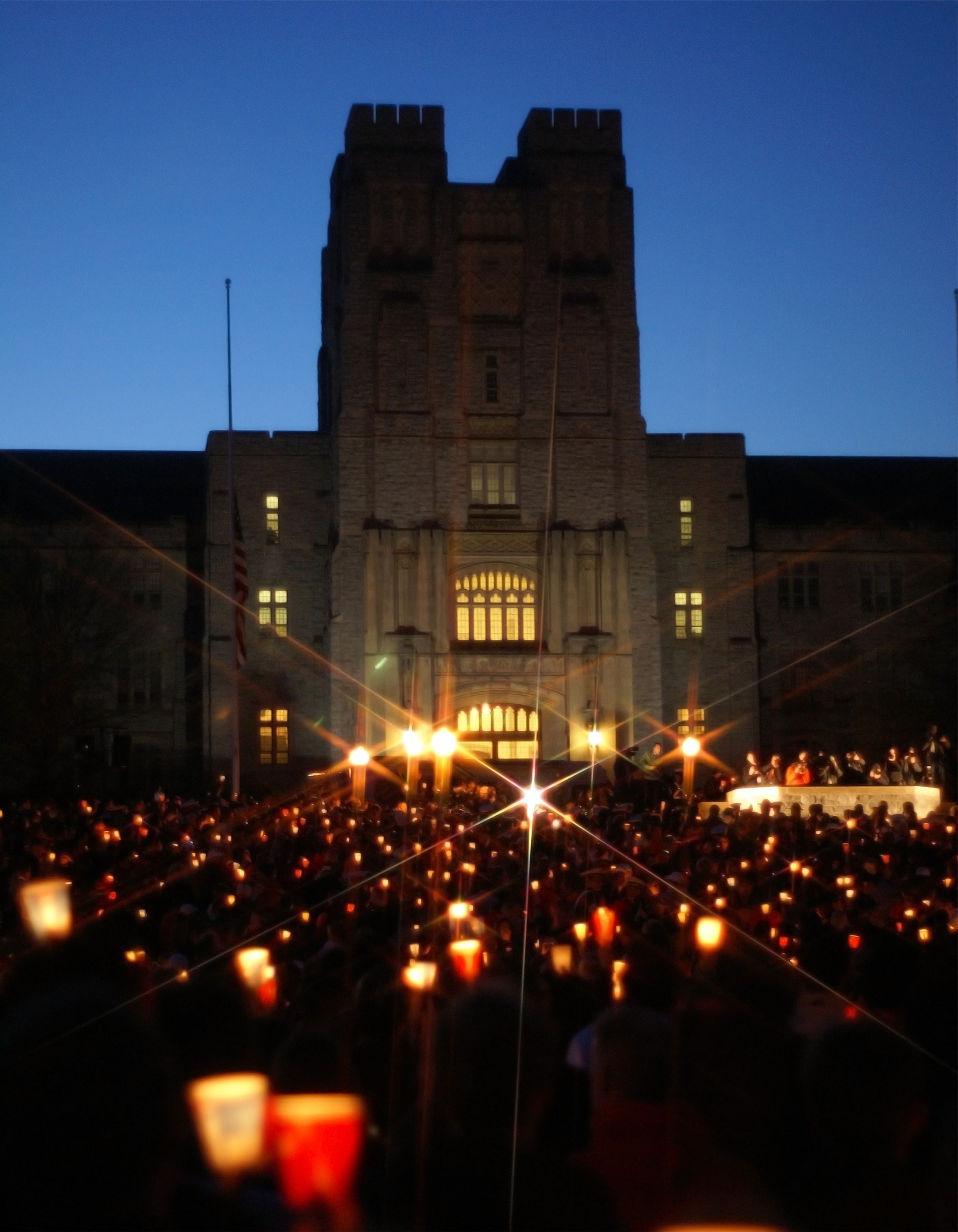
- A candlelight vigil following the shooting on the Virginia Tech campus on April 17, 2007
- Location: 37.2231°N 80.4211°W (Ambler Johnston Hall); 37.2294°N 80.4231°W (Norris Hall); Blacksburg, Virginia, U.S.
- Date: April 16, 2007; 19 years ago c. 9:40 – 9:51 a.m. (EDT)
- Target: Students, staff and faculty at Virginia Tech
- Attack type: Mass shooting; school shooting; mass murder; murder–suicide
- Weapons: 9mm Glock 19 semi-automatic pistol; .22 caliber Walther P22 semi-automatic pistol
- Deaths: 33 (31 killed in Norris Hall, including the perpetrator, as well as 2 prior victims fatally shot in West Ambler Johnston Hall at 7:15 a.m.)
- Injuries: 23 (17 from gunfire)
- Perpetrator: Seung-Hui Cho
- Defenders: Liviu Librescu; Kevin Granata; G. V. Loganathan; Jocelyne Couture-Nowak; Haiyan Cheng; Derek O'Dell; Katelyn Carney; Henry Lee; Zach Petkewicz; Matthew La Porte

The Virginia Tech shooting (also known at the time as the Virginia Tech massacre) was a mass shooting that occurred on Monday, April 16, 2007, comprising two attacks on the campus of the Virginia Polytechnic Institute and State University (Virginia Tech) in Blacksburg, Virginia, United States. Seung-Hui Cho, a 23-year-old undergraduate student at the university, killed 32 people and wounded 17 others with two semi-automatic pistols before committing suicide. Six others were injured jumping out of windows to escape Cho.

Cho's shooting spree was the deadliest mass shooting in U.S. history and remained so for nine years until the Pulse nightclub shooting. It remains the deadliest school shooting in U.S. history and the deadliest mass shooting in Virginia history.

Cho first fatally shot two people at West Ambler Johnston Hall, a dormitory. Two hours later, he perpetrated a school shooting at Norris Hall, a classroom building, where he chained the main entrance doors shut and fired into four classrooms and a stairwell, killing thirty more people. As police stormed Norris Hall, Cho fatally shot himself in the head.

The attacks received international media coverage. It sparked debate about gun violence, gun laws, gaps in the U.S. system for treating mental health issues, Cho's state of mind, the responsibility of college administrations, privacy laws, journalism ethics, and other issues. News organizations that aired portions of Cho's multimedia manifesto were criticized by victims' families, Virginia law enforcement officials, and the American Psychiatric Association.

Cho had previously been diagnosed with selective mutism and severe depression. During much of his middle school and high school years, he received therapy and special education support. After graduating from high school, Cho enrolled at Virginia Tech. Because of federal privacy laws, the university was unaware of Cho's previous diagnoses or the accommodations he had been granted at school. In 2005, Cho was accused of stalking two female students. After an investigation, a Virginia special justice declared Cho mentally ill and ordered him to attend treatment. Because he was not institutionalized, he was allowed to purchase guns. The shooting prompted the state of Virginia to close legal loopholes that had allowed individuals determined mentally unsound to purchase handguns without detection by the National Instant Criminal Background Check System (NICS). It also led to the passage of the first major federal gun control measure in the U.S. since 1994. The law strengthening the NICS was signed by President George W. Bush on January 5, 2008.

Administrators at Virginia Tech were criticized by the Virginia Tech Review Panel, a state-appointed panel tasked with investigating the incident, for failing to take action that might have decreased the number of casualties. The panel's report also reviewed gun laws and pointed out gaps in mental health care as well as privacy laws that left Cho's deteriorating condition untreated when he was a student at Virginia Tech.

== Attacks ==
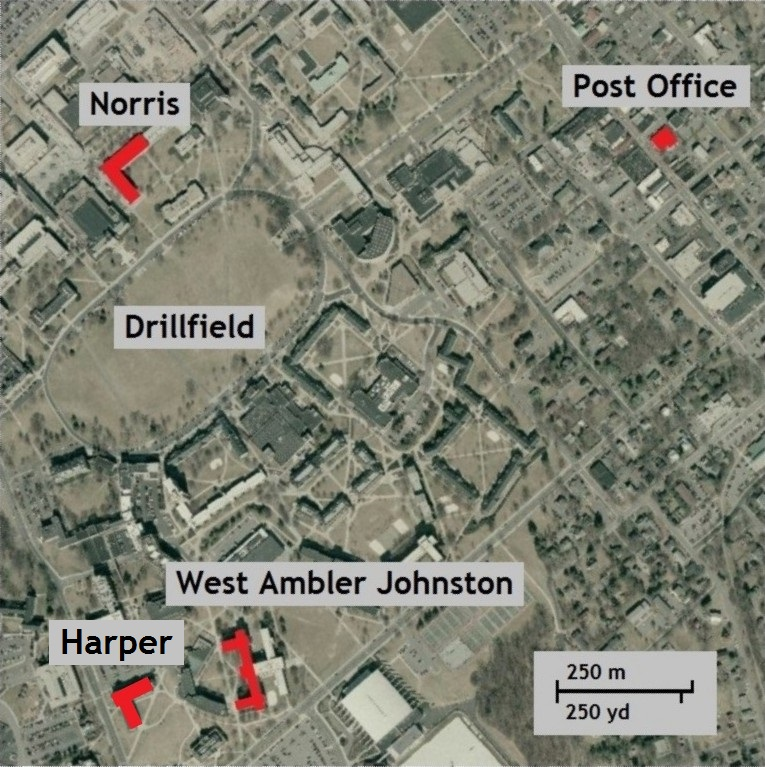
Aerial photo showing location of Harper Hall (Cho's dorm), Norris Hall, West Ambler Johnston Hall, and the Blacksburg, Virginia, U.S. Post Office

The shootings occurred in two separate incidents. The first incident was in West Ambler Johnston Hall, a residence hall where Seung-Hui Cho killed two students. The second incident was in Norris Hall, an academic building on the opposite side of the campus where the other thirty-one deaths occurred, including that of Cho himself, and all the nonlethal injuries occurred. Cho used two semi-automatic pistols during the attacks: a .22-caliber Walther P22 and a 9mm Glock 19.

=== West Ambler Johnston shootings ===
Cho was seen near the entrance to West Ambler Johnston Hall, a co-ed residence hall that houses 895 students, at about 6:47 a.m. EDT. Normally, the hall is accessible only to its residents via magnetic key cards before 10:00 a.m.; Cho's student mailbox was in the lobby of the building, so he had a pass card allowing access after 7:30 a.m., but it is unclear how he gained earlier entrance to the building.

At around 7:15 a.m., Cho entered the room that freshman Emily Jane Hilscher shared with another student, Heather Haugh, and shot Hilscher, a 19-year-old from Woodville, Virginia. After hearing the gunshots, the dormitory floor’s male resident assistant (RA), 22-year-old senior Ryan C. Clark of Martinez, Georgia, attempted to aid Hilscher. Cho shot and killed Clark. Hilscher remained alive for three hours after being shot, but no one from the school, law enforcement, or hospital notified her family until after she had died. Hilscher died in Roanoke, Virginia. Hilscher and Haugh were out of campus the night before, and Hilscher's boyfriend, Karl Thornhill, dropped her off at around 7:02 am.

Cho left the scene and another freshman, Molly Donohue, who lived across from Hilscher and Haugh, tried entering the room after seeing bloodied footprints, but couldn't enter as a body was blocking the door. Donohue ran to the male RA (Clark)’s room, finding it empty. Donohue’s roommate went to find the floor’s female RA, who soon after forced her way into the room. She returned seconds later and told Donohue, her roommate, and two other women to call for help.

Cho returned to his room in Harper Hall, a dormitory west of West Ambler Johnston Hall. While police and emergency medical services units were responding to the shootings in the dorm next door, Cho changed out of his bloodstained clothes, logged on to his computer to delete his e-mails and his student university account, and then removed the hard drive. About an hour after the attack, Cho is believed to have been seen near the campus duck pond. Although authorities suspected Cho had thrown his hard drive and mobile phone into the water, a search by divers was unsuccessful.

Almost two hours after the first killings, Cho appeared at a nearby post office and mailed a package of writings and video recordings to NBC News; these materials proved to be of little investigative value to authorities. The package was postmarked at 9:01 a.m.

=== Norris Hall shootings ===
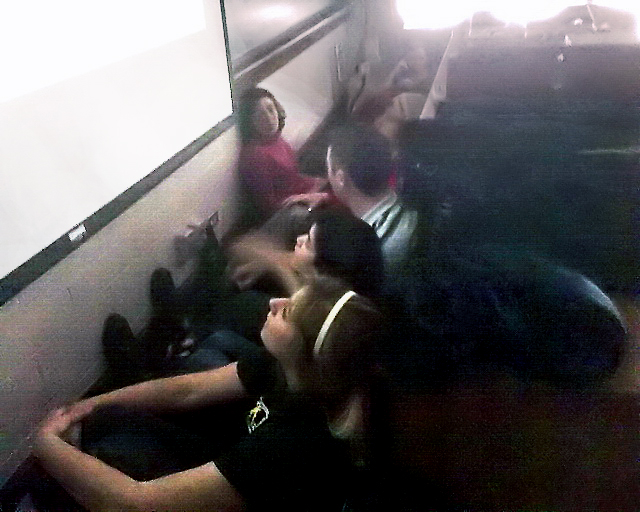
Elementary French class students take cover in Holden Hall room 212.

Around 9:40 a.m., Cho entered Norris Hall, which housed the Engineering Science and Mechanics program among others. In a backpack, he carried heavy duty chains and locks, a hammer, a knife, two handguns with nineteen 10- and 15-round magazines, and nearly 400 rounds of ammunition. With the locks and chains, he chained the three main entrance doors shut and placed a note on one, saying that attempting to open the door would cause a bomb to explode. Shortly before the shooting began, a faculty member found the note and took it to the third floor to notify the school's administration. At about the same time, Cho had begun to shoot students and faculty on the second floor. The bomb threat was never called in. The first call to 9-1-1 was received at 9:42 a.m.

Cho prepared his gear for the shooting in empty Room 200 before it began. According to several students, he looked into several classrooms, likely to see how many people were in each room. Erin Sheehan, an eyewitness who had been in Room 207, told reporters that the shooter "peeked in twice" earlier in the lesson and that "it was strange that someone at this point in the semester would be lost, looking for a class". At 9:40 a.m., Cho began shooting. His first attack after entering Norris occurred in an advanced hydrology engineering class taught by G. V. Loganathan in room 206. Thirteen registered students were inside. Cho shot and killed the professor, then continued firing, killing nine of the thirteen students in the room and injuring two others.

After exiting the classroom, Cho fired down the hall at two students, Jamal Carver of Virginia Beach, Virginia, and Yang Kim, who were fleeing from Room 204 next door. Carver was shot in the arm while Kim survived uninjured. They managed to escape down the stairwell across the hall. He also fired at another student, Theresa Walsh of Binghamton, New York, and grad student and substitute professor Haiyan Cheng (Chinese: 程海燕; pinyin: Chéng Hǎiyàn) of Hohhot, Inner Mongolia from Room 205 who were peering out from the door. Neither woman was shot. Another student in Room 205, Zach Petkewicz, helped Cheng barricade the doors. He went into Room 207, where instructor Jamie Bishop was teaching Introductory German. Cho shot Bishop and some students near the door, then walked down the aisle shooting more victims. Bishop and four students were killed; six other students were shot and wounded. Cho then moved on to Norris 211 and 204, where he was initially prevented from entering due to barricades erected by instructors and students.

Hearing the commotion from below, Kevin Granata guided twenty students from a classroom on the third floor into his office where the door could be locked and went downstairs to investigate along with another professor, Wally Grant, where they were both shot by Cho in the hallway. Grant, who quickly fled into a bathroom, was wounded and survived, but Granata died of his injuries. None of the students locked in Granata's office were hurt or killed.

In Room 211 of Intermediate French, Jocelyne Couture-Nowak saw Cho heading towards the doorway. She and student Henry Lee barricaded the door with a few desks while she yelled at students to get down on the floor and under their desks and call 9-1-1. Cho pushed through the barricade and entered the room, killing Nowak and Lee who fell behind the door. A student named Matthew La Porte, who was a trained Air Force ROTC member of the Virginia Tech Corps of Cadets, charged towards Cho and attempted to tackle him, but died after being shot seven times during his attempt to save his class. (Note: LaPorte was posthumously awarded the Airman's Medal for his actions in 2015, which was accepted by his family at his gravesite in Blacksburg.) Of the 22 students enrolled in the class, 18 were present at the time of the shooting. In addition to the professor, a total of eleven students were killed and another six were injured. The sole uninjured survivor, Clay Violand, played dead and was (alongside a wounded female student) one of only two people to walk out of the room as soon as police arrived. As in Room 207, Cho fired into Room 211 from the doorway, and then walked up and down the aisles methodically targeting potential survivors as they tried to hide. He did not say a single word throughout the shooting and occasionally reloaded his weapon in the hallways, before re-entering classrooms to resume shooting.

Retracing his path, Cho returned to Room 206. According to a student eyewitness, the movements of a student named Waleed Shaalan, who was already wounded, distracted the aggressor from a nearby student after he had returned to the room. Shaalan was shot a second time and died. Also in the same room, another wounded student named Guillermo Colman was shielded from more serious injury by having the body of student Partahi Lumbantoruan placed on top of him, but Colman's various accounts make it unclear whether he pulled Lumbantoruan's body over himself or Lumbantoruan initially landed on Colman after being shot the first time. Two other students who were also in the room made it out alive. (Cho had entered Room 206 three times.)

After his first entry to Room 207, several students had barricaded the door and had begun tending to the wounded. When Cho returned minutes later, Katelyn Carney and spokesperson Derek O'Dell were injured while holding the door closed, but the remaining students survived. In room 205, students had already barricaded the door with a large table after graduate assistant Cheng and Petkewicz blocked the door. Cho shot through the door about seven times, but failed to force his way in. No one in the classroom was wounded or killed.

Across the hall in Room 204, Liviu Librescu, a Holocaust survivor from Romania, forcibly prevented the gunman from entering the room by holding the door closed with his body until most of his students escaped through the windows. After kicking open the window screens, the students successfully escaped. Some suffered leg injuries while landing on the ground two floors below; others survived after landing on the shrubbery just below the window and then ran either to some ambulances pulling up or to the nearest bus stop. Librescu was shot through the door four times. Two others who were lying in a corner near the windows were injured, but survived and described that, after most of their classmates escaped through the windows and after the armed aggressor shot four times through the door, he finally forced his way in. Upon seeing the open windows and hardly any students in the room, Cho confronted Librescu and student Minal Panchal who was lying on the ground next to the door and fatally shot both in the temple. He then turned to two other students who were taking cover and critically injured them before leaving and re-entering room 206 the third time. At 9:50 am, 10 minutes after the second shooting began, a SWAT team started to enter the building. They were not able to shoot their way through the chain locked entrances, but managed entry via a separate entrance. They went up to the third floor, but heard from student Emily Haas, who was wounded and survived in room 211 (Nowak's French class), saying that the gunman was in her classroom as she stayed on the line. Cho heard the police descend the stairwell. He looked out into the hallway briefly, before going back into the center of room 211 towards the windows and, just as police reached the second floor, shot himself in the temple with the Glock 19 and died instantly. When police arrived at room 211, they saw Cho lying on the ground with his guns beside him, and some students, who were either injured or playing dead, heard the officer's first words: "Gunman down!". During the investigation, State Police Superintendent W. Steven Flaherty told a state panel that police found 203 remaining rounds of ammunition in Norris Hall on Cho and later testified that the armed aggressor was well prepared to continue on.

During the two attacks, Cho killed a total of 32 people — 5 faculty members and 27 students — before he died by suicide. The Virginia Tech Review Panel reported that Cho's gunshots wounded seventeen others; six more were injured when they jumped from second-story windows to escape from Librescu's classroom. Sydney J. Vail, the director of the trauma center at Carilion Roanoke Memorial Hospital, said that Cho's choice of 9 mm hollow-point ammunition increased the severity of the injuries. Between the two pistols, a total of 174 bullets were fired by the assailant during the attacks. Twenty-eight of the thirty-two victims were shot in the head.

== Perpetrator ==
The shooter was identified as Seung-Hui Cho (January 18, 1984 – April 16, 2007), a senior at Virginia Tech. He was a South Korean citizen with U.S. permanent resident status who was majoring in English.

The Virginia Tech Review Panel's August 2007 report (Massengill Report) devoted more than twenty pages to Cho's troubled history. At three years of age, he was described as shy, frail, and wary of physical contact. In eighth grade, Cho was diagnosed with severe depression and selective mutism, an anxiety disorder that inhibited him from speaking in certain situations and/or to specific people. While early media reports carried claims by South Korean relatives that Cho was autistic, the Massengill Report said the relationship between selective mutism and autism was "unclear". Cho's family sought therapy for him, and he received help periodically throughout middle school and high school. Early reports indicated Cho was bullied for speech difficulties in middle school, but the Virginia Tech Review Panel was unable to confirm this, or other reports that he was ostracized and mercilessly bullied for class-, height-, and race-related reasons in high school, causing some anti-bullying advocates to feel that the Review Panel was engaging in an authority-absolving whitewash. Supposedly, high school officials had worked with Cho's parents and mental health counselors to support him throughout his sophomore and junior years. Cho eventually chose to discontinue therapy. When he applied and was admitted to Virginia Tech, school officials did not report his speech and anxiety-related problems or special education status because of federal privacy laws that prohibit such disclosure unless a student requests special accommodation.

The Massengill Report detailed numerous incidents of aberrant behavior, beginning during Cho's junior year, that illustrated his deteriorating mental condition. Several of Cho's former professors reported that his writing as well as his classroom behavior was disturbing, and he was encouraged to seek counseling. He was also investigated by the university for stalking and harassing two female students. In 2005, Cho had been declared mentally ill by a Virginia special justice and ordered to seek outpatient treatment. Cho's underlying psychological diagnosis at the time of the shootings remains a matter of speculation.

The Massengill Report cited misinterpretations of federal privacy laws when it faulted Virginia Tech officials for failing to share information that would have shed light on the seriousness of Cho's problems. The report pointed to failures by the university's counseling center, flaws in Virginia's mental health laws, and inadequate state mental health services, but concluded that "Cho himself was the biggest impediment to stabilizing his mental health" in college. The report also said the classification detail that Cho was to seek "outpatient" rather than "inpatient" treatment would generally have been legally interpreted at the time as not requiring that Cho be reported to Virginia's Central Criminal Records Exchange (CCRE) and entered into the CCRE database of people prohibited from purchasing or possessing a firearm.

Early reports suggested that the killings resulted from a romantic dispute between Cho and Emily Hilscher, one of his first two victims. Hilscher's friends said she had no prior relationship with Cho and there is no evidence that he ever met or talked with her before the murders. In the ensuing investigation, police found a suicide note in Cho's dorm room that included comments about "rich kids", "debauchery", and "deceitful charlatans". On April 18, 2007, NBC News received the package Cho had shipped between the first and second shooting episodes, which contained an 1,800-word manifesto, photos, and 27 digitally-recorded videos in which he likened himself to Jesus Christ and expressed his hatred of the wealthy, while also referring to Columbine High School massacre perpetrators Eric Harris and Dylan Klebold as "martyrs". Cho said, among other things: "You forced me into a corner and gave me only one option. ... You just loved to crucify me. You loved inducing cancer in my head, terror in my heart and ripping my soul all this time".

Media organizations, including Newsweek, MSNBC, Reuters, and the Associated Press, raised questions about and speculated on the similarity between a stance in one of Cho's videos that showed him holding and raising a hammer, and a pose from promotional posters for the South Korean film Oldboy. Investigators found no evidence that Cho had ever watched Oldboy, and the professor who made the initial connection has since discounted his theory that Cho was influenced by the movie. The Virginia Tech Review Panel concluded that because of Cho's inability to handle stress and the "frightening prospect" of being "turned out into the world of work, finances, responsibilities, and a family," he chose to engage in a fantasy in which "he would be remembered as the savior of the oppressed, the downtrodden, the poor, and the rejected." The panel went further, stating that, "His thought processes were so distorted that he began arguing to himself that his evil plan was actually doing good. His destructive fantasy was now becoming an obsession."

== Responses to the incidents ==
=== Emergency services response ===
Police arrived within three minutes after receiving the emergency call from Norris Hall, but officers took about five minutes to enter the barricaded building. When they could not break the chains, an officer shot out a deadbolt lock leading into a laboratory; they then moved to a nearby stairwell. As police reached the second floor, they heard Cho fire his final shot; Cho's body was discovered in room 211, which was Professor Nowak's classroom.

In the aftermath, high winds related to the April 2007 nor'easter prevented emergency medical services from using helicopters for evacuation of the injured. Victims injured in the shooting were treated at Montgomery Regional Hospital in Blacksburg, Carilion New River Valley Medical Center in Radford, Carilion Roanoke Memorial Hospital in Roanoke, Lewis-Gale Medical Center in Salem, and Holston Valley Hospital in Kingsport, Tennessee.

=== University response ===
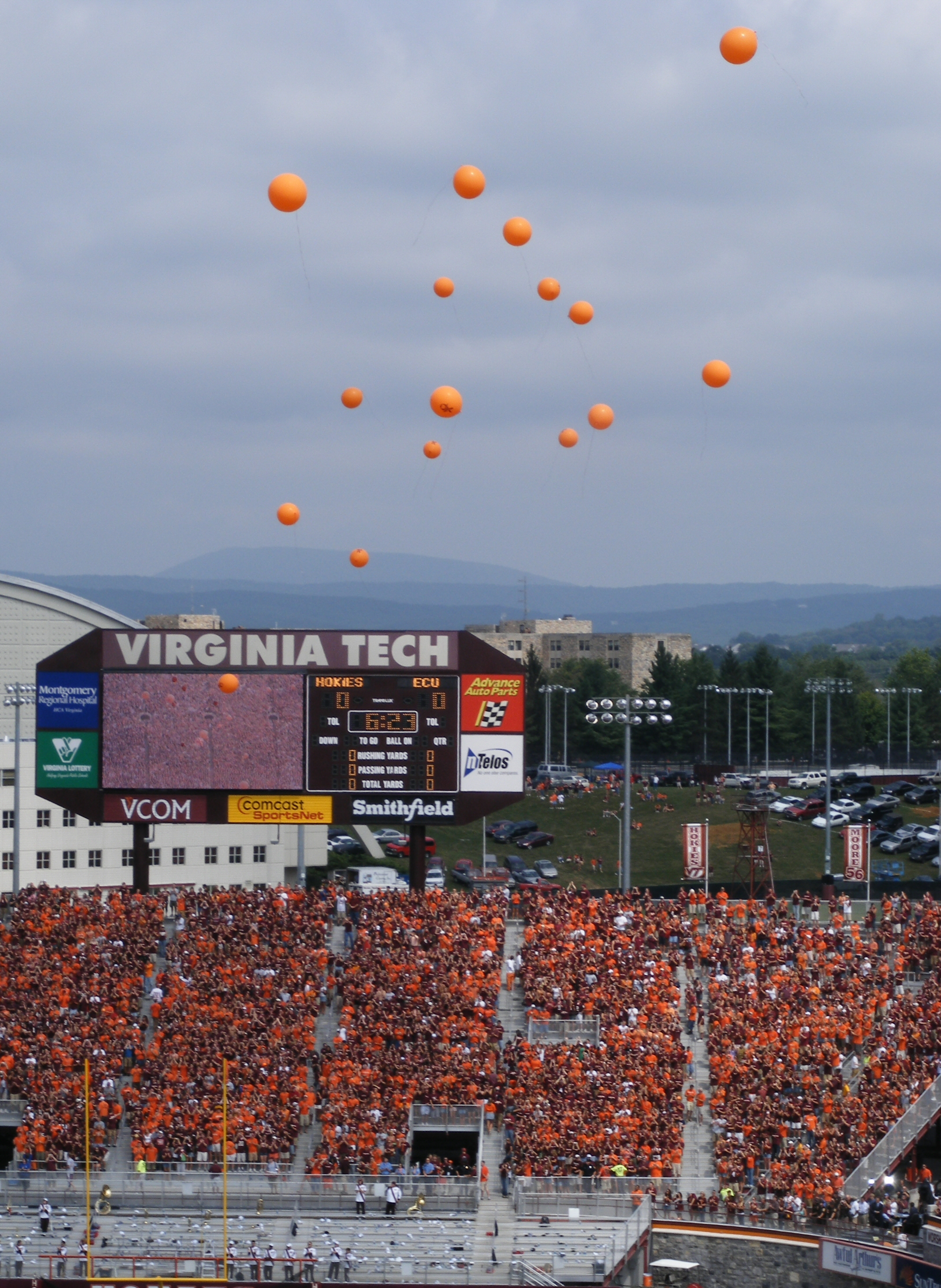
The Hokies released 32 balloons before their 2007 football opener as part of a ceremony in the victims' memory.

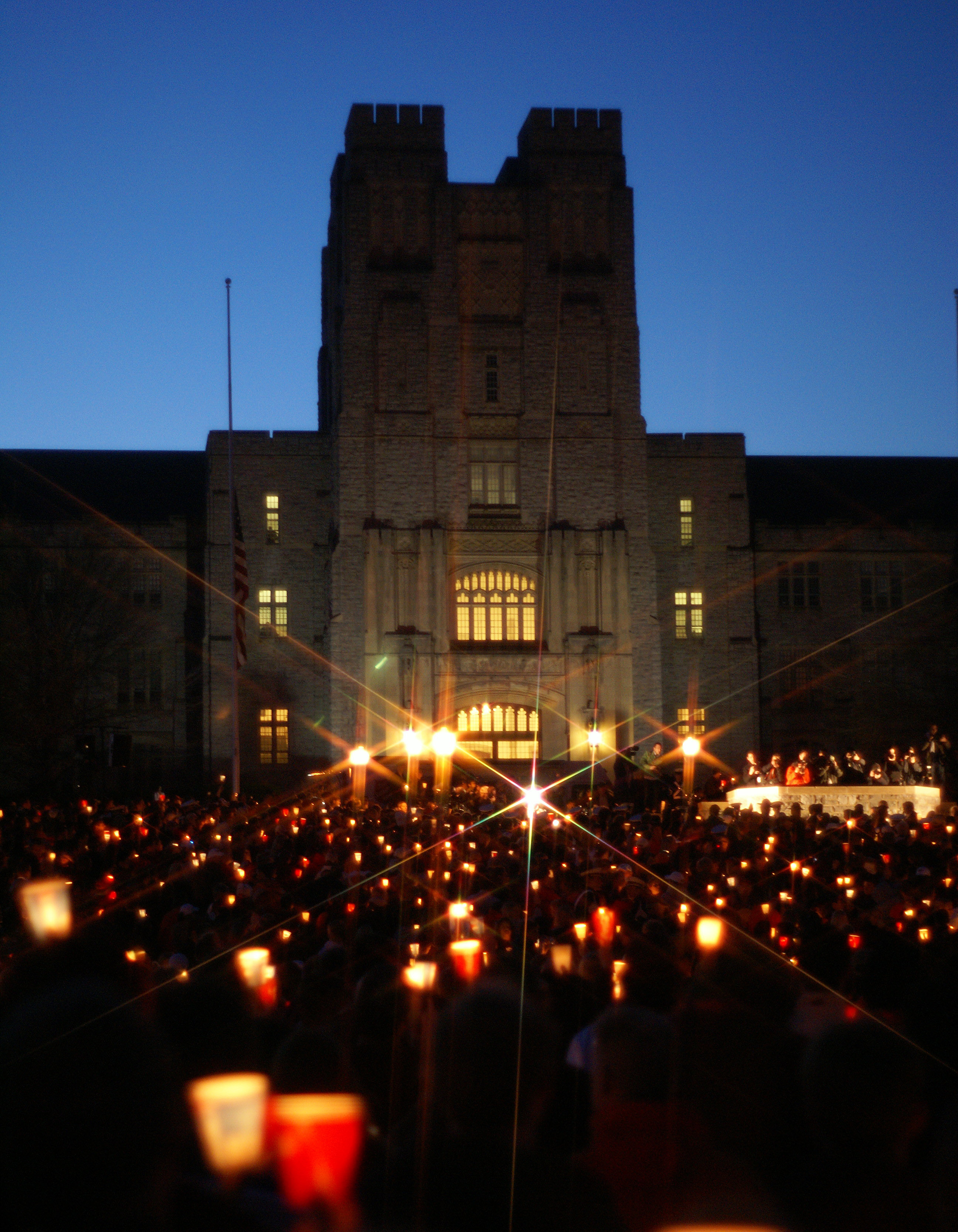
A candlelight vigil following the shooting on the Virginia Tech campus on April 17, 2007.

Virginia Tech first informed students of the situation via e-mail at 9:26 a.m. This was about two hours after the first shooting, which was thought at the time to be isolated and domestic in nature. After the full extent of the shooting became evident, the university canceled classes for the rest of the week and held an assembly and candlelight vigil the following evening, on April 17. Norris Hall was closed for the remainder of the semester. The university offered counseling for students and faculty, and the American Red Cross dispatched several dozen crisis counselors to Blacksburg to help students. University officials also allowed students, if they chose, to abbreviate their semester coursework and still receive a grade.

The day following the shooting, a memorial event was held at Cassell Coliseum. The event included a speech by then-President George W. Bush. The space reached capacity and overflow seating was accommodated at nearby Lane Stadium.

Within a day after the shootings, Virginia Tech, whose supporters call themselves "Hokies" – a nickname coined in a school cheer dating to 1896 – formed the Hokie Spirit Memorial Fund (HSMF) to help remember and honor the victims. The fund was used to cover expenses including, but not limited to: assistance to victims and their families, grief counseling, memorials, communications expenses, and comfort expenses. Early in June 2007, the Virginia Tech Foundation announced that $3.2 million was moved from the HSMF into 32 separately-named endowment funds, each created in honor of a victim killed in the shooting. This transfer brought each fund to the level of full endowment, allowing them to operate in perpetuity. The naming and determination of how each fund would be directed was being developed with the victims' families. By early June 2007, donations to the HSMF had reached approximately $7 million. In July 2007, Kenneth R. Feinberg, who served as Special Master of the federal September 11th Victim Compensation Fund of 2001, was named to administer the fund's distributions. In October 2007, the families and surviving victims received payments from the fund ranging from $11,500 to $208,000.

Early in June 2007, Virginia Tech announced that it would begin to reoccupy Norris Hall within a matter of weeks. The building is used for offices and laboratories for the Engineering Science and Mechanics and Civil and Environmental Engineering departments, its primary occupants before the shootings. Plans were to completely renovate the building and for it to no longer contain classrooms. The southwest wing of Norris Hall, where the shootings took place, was closed in 2008 and completely renovated in 2008 and 2009. The building now houses the Center for Peace Studies and Violence Prevention, the Biomechanics Cluster Research Center, and the Global Technology Center, as well as other programs.

Ambler Johnston Hall was also closed and renovated. The east wing now houses the Honors Residential College, which opened in fall 2011; in fall 2012, the west wing reopened as the Residential College at West Ambler Johnston.

After the release of the Massengill Report, some of the victims' families called for then-Governor Tim Kaine to relieve Virginia Tech's president, Charles W. Steger, and campus police chief, Wendell Flinchum, of their positions. Kaine refused, reasoning the school officials had "suffered enough".

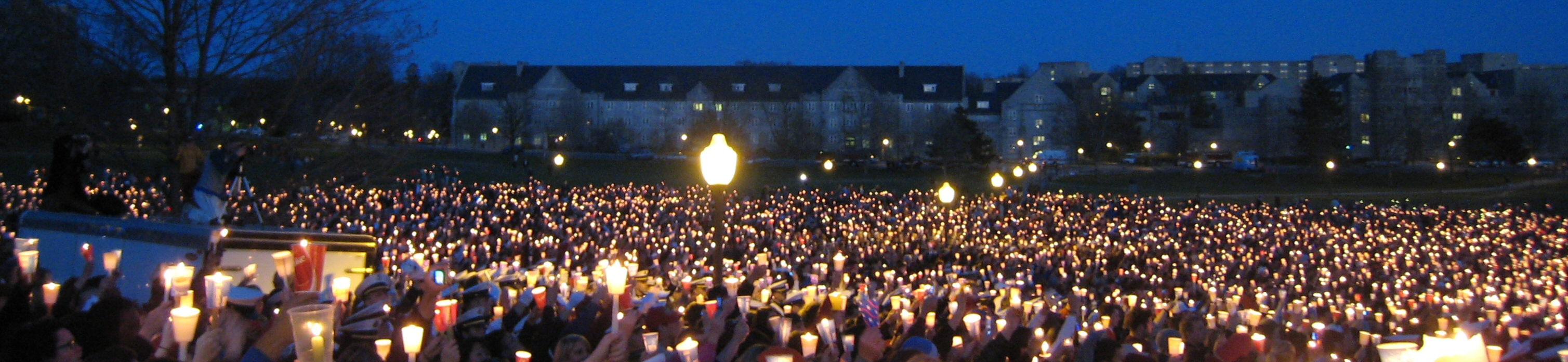
The Virginia Tech community mourns the victims at a candlelight vigil.

=== Campus response ===
In the hours and days following the shooting, makeshift memorials to those killed or injured began appearing in several locations on the campus. Many people placed flowers and items of remembrance at the base of the Drillfield observation podium in front of Burruss Hall. Later, members of Hokies United, an alliance of student organizations on campus created to respond to shooting, placed thirty-two pieces of Hokie Stone, each labeled with the name of a victim, in a semicircle in front of the Drillfield viewing stand. What was originally termed an "intermediate memorial" was modeled after the makeshift memorial. The original pieces of Hokie Stone placed by Hokies United were offered to the families of the victims. The engraved markers are embedded in a semicircle of crushed gravel with a brick walkway for viewing. There is ground lighting for nighttime illumination and two benches, one on either side of the memorial, in honor of the survivors.

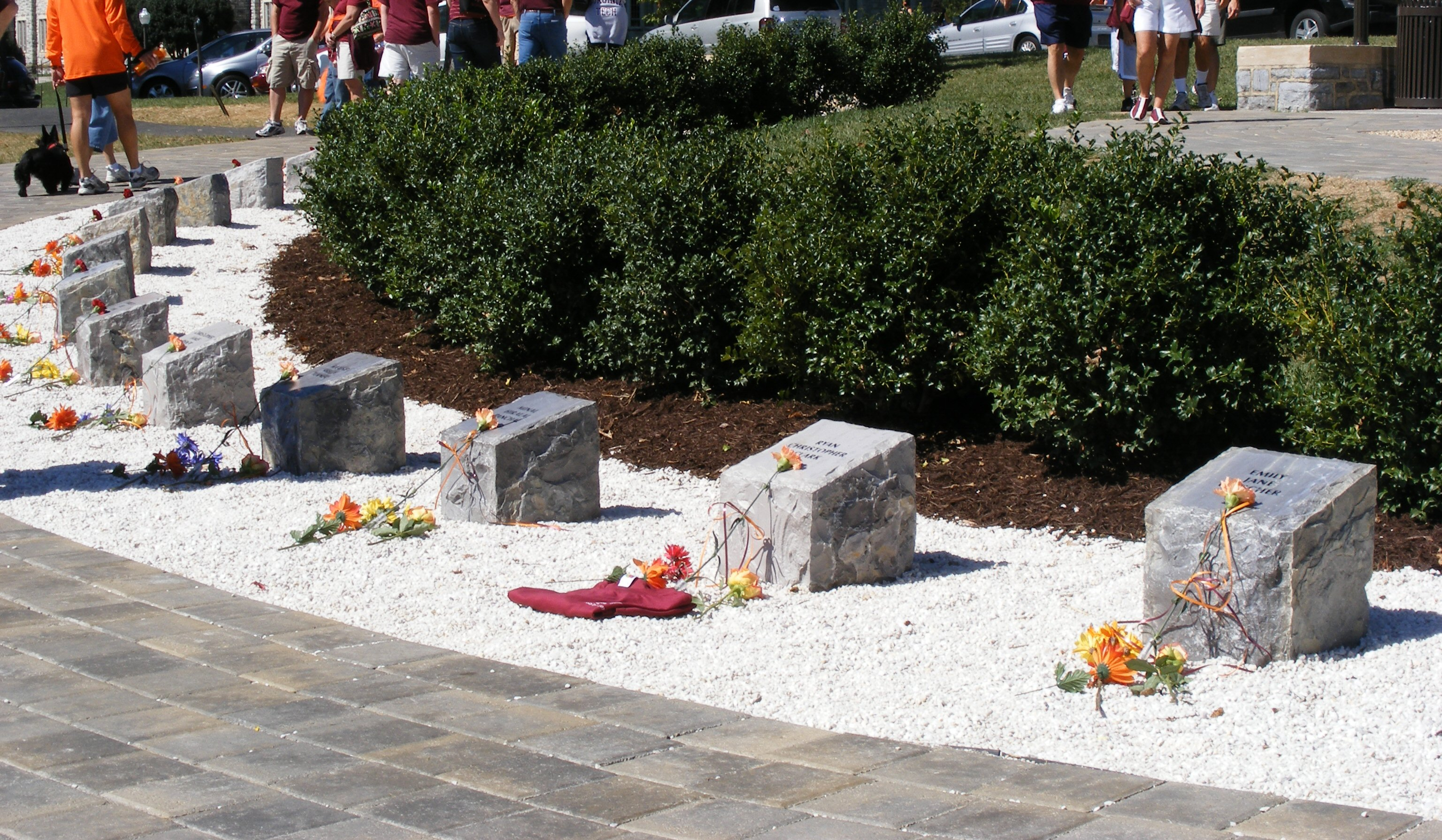
Permanent memorial on Virginia Tech's Drillfield

Tech students of South Korean descent initially feared they would be targeted for retribution. While no official claims of harassment were made, anecdotal evidence suggests that some Korean students were affected.

The shootings occurred as prospective students were deciding whether to accept offers of admission from colleges and universities. Despite this timing, Virginia Tech exceeded its recruiting goal of 5,000 students for the class of 2011.

=== Global support and outreach ===
In the days following the shooting, the campus community received several thousand pieces of artifacts and messages of condolence, arriving from over eighty countries and every state within the U.S. These included artwork, cards, poetry, and original music. These items were later gathered and photographed by the University Library and are available online.

=== Government response ===
President Bush and his wife, First Lady Laura Bush, attended the convocation at Virginia Tech the day after the shootings. The Internal Revenue Service and Virginia Department of Taxation granted six-month extensions to individuals affected by the shootings. Governor Kaine returned early from a trade mission to Japan and declared a state of emergency in Virginia, enabling him to immediately deploy state personnel, equipment, and other resources in the aftermath of the shootings.

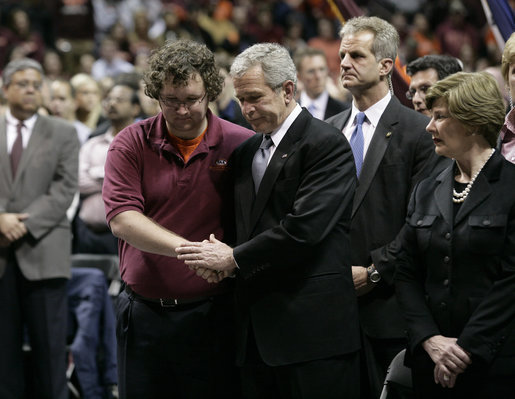
President George W. Bush comforts Virginia Tech Student Government Association President James Tyger after giving his speech at the school's convocation. Laura Bush looks on.

Governor Kaine later created an eight-member panel, including former Secretary of Homeland Security Tom Ridge, to review all aspects of the incident, from Cho's medical history to Virginia Tech's delay in warning students after the initial shooting. In August 2007, the panel concluded, among more than twenty major findings, that the Virginia Tech Police Department "did not take sufficient action to deal with what might happen if the initial lead proved erroneous". The panel made more than seventy preventive recommendations, directed to colleges, universities, mental health providers, law enforcement officials, emergency service providers, law makers and other public officials in Virginia and elsewhere. While the panel did find errors in judgment and procedure, the ultimate conclusion was that Cho himself was responsible for his own actions, and to imply that anyone else was accountable "would be wrong". The Review Panel validated public criticisms that Virginia Tech police erred in "prematurely concluding that their initial lead in the double homicide was a good one" and in delaying a campus-wide notification for almost two hours. The report analyzed the feasibility of a campus lockdown and essentially agreed with police testimony that such an action was not feasible. The report concluded that the toll could have been reduced if the university had made an immediate decision to cancel classes and a stronger, clearer initial alert of the presence of a gunman.

The incident caused Virginia state lawmakers to re-examine gaps between federal and state gun purchase laws. Within two weeks, Governor Kaine had issued an executive order designed to close those gaps (see Effects on gun politics below). Prompted by the incident, the federal government passed the first gun control law in more than a decade. The bill, H.R. 2640, mandates improvements in state reporting to the National Instant Criminal Background Check System (NICS) in order to halt gun purchases by criminals, those declared mentally ill, and other people prohibited from possessing firearms, and authorizes up to $1.3 billion in federal grants for such improvements. Both the Brady Campaign to Prevent Gun Violence and the National Rifle Association (NRA) supported the legislation. The measure passed the House of Representatives on a voice vote on June 13, 2007. The Senate passed the measure on December 19, 2007. President Bush signed the measure on January 5, 2008. On March 24, 2008, the Department of Education announced proposed changes in the regulations governing education records under the Family Educational Rights and Privacy Act (FERPA). Certain changes address issues raised by the Virginia Tech shooting and are intended to clarify for schools the appropriate balance to strike between concerns of individual privacy and public safety.

=== South Korean response ===
When the citizenship of the shooter became known, South Koreans expressed shock and a sense of public shame, while the government of South Korea convened an emergency meeting to consider possible ramifications. A candlelight vigil was held outside the U.S. embassy in Seoul. South Korean President Roh Moo-hyun expressed condolences, saying that he hoped that the U.S. would recover quickly from the incident. Although Cho came to the U.S. as a third-grader and was a permanent resident, many South Koreans felt guilt and mourned because they considered him a South Korean by "blood". One South Korean commentator opined that fears of xenophobic reprisals from Americans against them were from a South Korean-centric perspective not applicable to U.S. culture. South Korea's ambassador to the U.S. and several Korean-American religious leaders called on Korean-Americans to participate in a thirty-two day fast, one day for each victim, for repentance. Foreign Minister Song Minsoon announced that safety measures had been established for South Korean citizens living in the U.S., in an apparent reference to fears of possible reprisal attacks. A ministry official expressed hope that the shooting would not "stir up racial prejudice or confrontation".

Some South Koreans criticized the fasting proposal, saying that it directed undue attention on Cho's ethnicity and not other reasons behind the shooting. News reports noted that South Koreans seemed relieved that American news coverage of Cho primarily focused the blame on his psychological problems rather than his race or ethnicity. The Korea Tourism Organization pulled its "Sparkling Korea" television advertisements, saying it would be inappropriate to air the ads featuring images of South Korea's culture and natural beauty in between the news reports of the rampage.

=== Academic/industry response ===
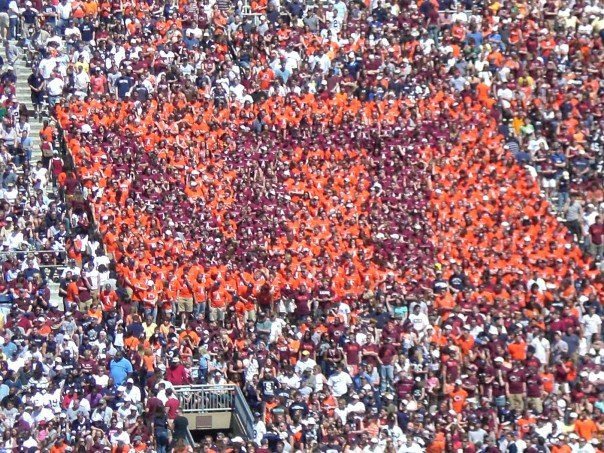
Penn State fans pay tribute to the fallen Hokies at the Nittany Lions spring football game.

Hundreds of colleges and universities throughout North America responded to the incident with official condolences and by conducting their own vigils, memorial services, and by other gestures of support. Virginia Tech's traditional sports rival, the University of Virginia (UVA), held a candlelight vigil the night of April 17, at which UVA president John T. Casteen III urged the crowd of students, which overflowed the campus's McIntire Amphitheatre, to continue to move forward to change the world. Some schools also offered or provided cash donations, housing for officers, and additional counseling support for Virginia Tech. The University of Texas at Austin and Texas A&M University, who also share a sports rivalry, also united and created shirts as both a tribute and fundraiser. The front read "Orange and Maroon support Orange and Maroon", in reference to Virginia Tech sharing orange as a school color with Texas and maroon as a color with Texas A&M. The back, meanwhile, read, "The Eyes of Texas are upon you / For your spirit can ne'er be told / In times of greatest tragedy / You have a hand to hold", referencing "The Eyes of Texas" and "Spirit of Aggieland".

Both inside the U.S. and abroad, the incident also caused many universities to re-examine their own campus safety and security procedures as well as their mental health support services.

=== Other responses ===
The International Association of Campus Law Enforcement Administrators convened a Special Review Task Force, which issued its report on April 18, 2008, titled, "The IACLEA Blueprint for Safer Campuses". The report was "a synthesis of the reports written following the tragedy at Virginia Tech and related recommendations for campus safety by the International Association of Campus Law Enforcement Administrators". The Task Force made twenty specific recommendations, representing "the Association's priorities for the betterment of campus safety" and reinforcing "key goals and objectives in mitigating and responding to threats at institutions of higher learning." The report states, "IACLEA does not support the carry and concealment of weapons on a college campus, with the exception of sworn police officers in the conduct of their professional duties". The subsequent Position Statement goes into greater detail. Additionally, the report includes an acknowledgement of the "professionalism and well coordinated response" of all the law enforcement agencies and first responders, and ends its conclusion with "Securing the safety of our campuses is an iterative process that requires an institutional and personal commitment from every member of our educational communities. Let these recommendations strengthen that resolve."

EQUITAS, a Canada-based think tank specializing in international law, published a report pertaining to the Virginia Tech shooting which includes a review of measures for counterterrorism and campus security adopted between 1993 and April 27, 2003. The report criticizes Virginia Tech's institutional decision-making process and summarizes the lethal effects of failing to "implement and administer valid procedural and substantive safeguards aimed at securing the broad Va Tech and Blacksburg community against Level II type incidents involving acts of terrorism and mass casualties". The report does not comment on gun control or mental health issues.

Some of Cho's family members expressed sympathy for the victims' families and described his history of mental and behavioral problems. Cho's maternal grandfather was quoted in the Daily Mirror referring to Cho as a person who deserved to die with the victims. On April 20, Cho's family issued a statement of grief and apology, written by his sister, Sun-Kyung Cho, a 2004 graduate of Princeton University who was employed as a contractor for a State Department office. In it, she stated:

He has made the world weep. We are living a nightmare. Our family is so very sorry for my brother's unspeakable actions. It is a terrible tragedy for all of us. We pray for their families and loved ones who are experiencing so much excruciating grief. And we pray for those who were injured and for those whose lives are changed forever because of what they witnessed and experienced. Each of these people had so much love, talent and gifts to offer, and their lives were cut short by a horrible and senseless act.

Many heads of state and international figures offered condolences and sympathy, including Pope Benedict XVI, the presidents of South Korea, Chile, France, Mexico, and Peru, the president-elect of Mauritania, the prime ministers of Greece and Japan, and the king of Morocco. Statements of condolence were issued by officials and diplomats from Canada, Georgia, Hungary, Iran, Nicaragua, Russia, Suriname, Thailand, and Venezuela. A State Department spokesman said, "We haven't seen this kind of sympathy and support since Hurricane Katrina and 9/11." South Korean UN Secretary-General Ban Ki-moon condemned the killings.

On May 3, 2007, Queen Elizabeth II addressed the Virginia General Assembly and extended her sympathy on behalf of the United Kingdom. She then met privately with some faculty and survivors, including three who were wounded. One of the survivors of the shooting, Katelyn Carney, who was shot in the hand, presented the Queen with a bracelet of thirty-two jewels in the Virginia Tech colors—maroon and orange. The Queen subsequently visited Jamestown, Virginia, to mark the 400th anniversary of the first permanent English settlement in North America, which was the primary purpose of her trip.

Sporting teams and leagues at both the college and professional levels, as well as sports figures from football, baseball, basketball, hockey, soccer, and NASCAR racing, paid their respects and joined fundraising efforts to honor the victims, most notably the Washington Nationals, who wore Virginia Tech hats during a game, and D.C. United, who wore special Virginia Tech jerseys during a game; NASCAR put Virginia Tech decals on all its cars for three weeks. East Carolina University made a $100,000 donation, raised at the behest of its Athletics Director, Terry Holland. East Carolina was the opponent for Virginia Tech's opening home football game at Lane Stadium on September 1, 2007, with more than 60,000 in attendance. Prior to the kickoff, thirty-two orange balloons were released in memory of the victims.

It came to light that Seung-Hui Cho used eBay to purchase two 10-round magazines for one of the guns used in the shootings. On July 30, 2007, the online auctioneer prohibited the sale of firearms magazines, firearms parts, and ammunition on its site.

In May 2010, the American band Exodus released an album titled, Exhibit B: The Human Condition, which included the track "Class Dismissed (A Hate Primer)". Band member Gary Holt stated, "The song was primarily inspired by the massacre at Virginia Tech, as well as Columbine and the many other instances of unhinged individuals who decided to take out their wrath on their classmates, going all the way back to Charles J. Whitman."

=== Controversial responses ===
Two students at Pennsylvania State University dressed as Virginia Tech shooting victims for Halloween in 2007, posting their photos on Facebook, which generated outrage at both Penn State and Virginia Tech. Penn State sent a statement to Virginia Tech, stating, "We're appalled that these individuals would display this level of insensitivity and lack of common decency by dressing up in this manner. The fact that one of the individuals is actually from Virginia makes it even more difficult to understand."

An amateur computer video game that re-creates the shooting, V-Tech Rampage, also sparked outrage. The creator, Ryan Lambourn, a resident of Sydney, Australia, who grew up in the U.S., posted a message on his website stating that he would remove the game in exchange for payment, but later posted that the statement was a joke. New York State Senator Andrew Lanza called for a boycott of the game, stating, "There are certain things in life you don't make light of and should not be turning into a game. It's not a game, it's a tremendous loss of life." The Australian Minister of Communications, Senator Helen Coonan, said that she would launch an official investigation, stating, "The individual responsible for the game is using a terrible tragedy to draw attention to himself and his work. It is in very poor taste and the person concerned may want to consider getting some professional help." Lambourn also created a video game based on the Sandy Hook Elementary School shooting, which drew criticism and sparked outrage.

=== Continuing response ===
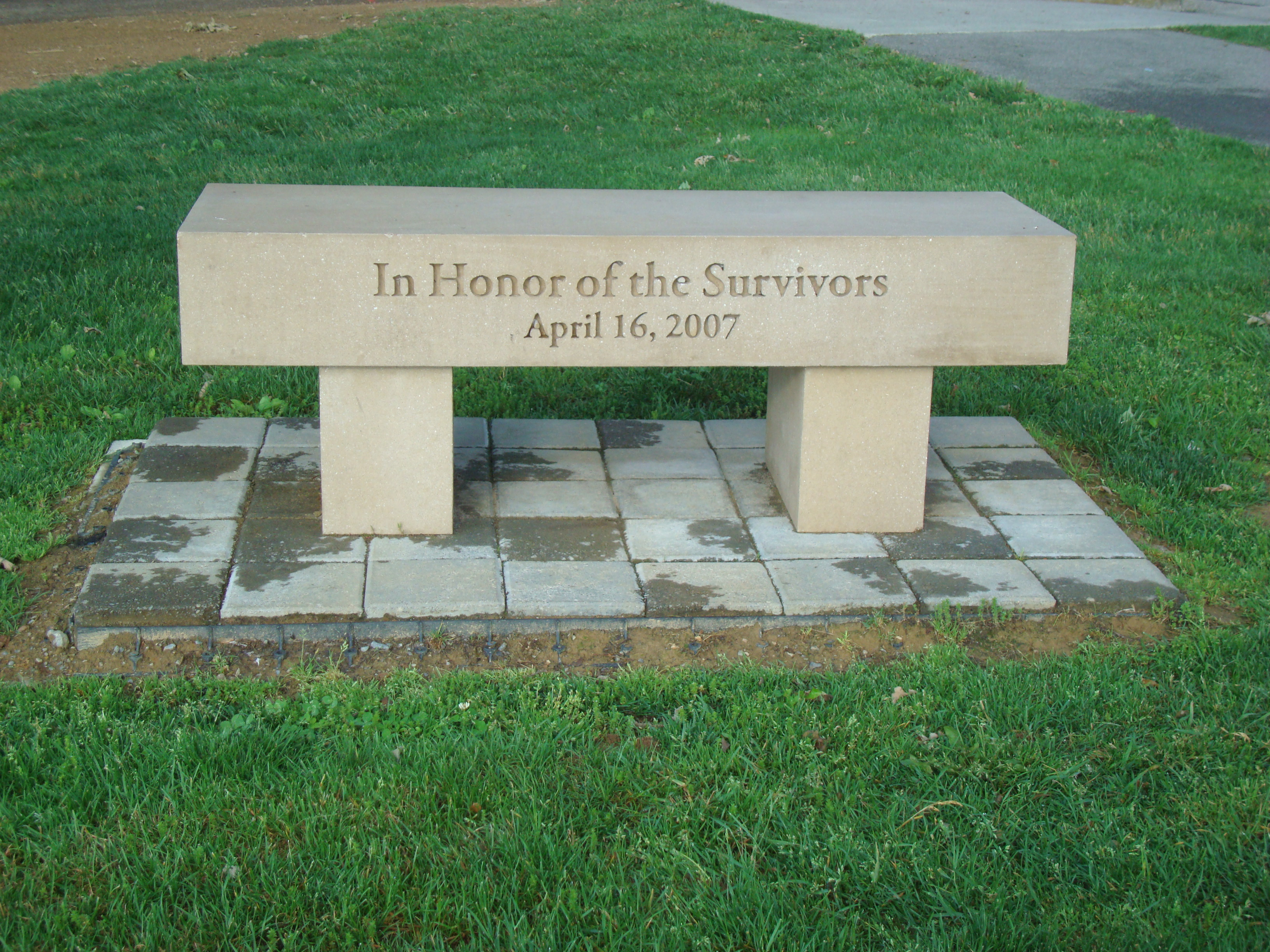
Bench in honor of the survivors of the shooting. It is slightly south of the main memorial.

A northern Virginia chapter of the B'nai B'rith Youth Organization, founded in November 2008 by Aaron Adler and Ethan Blonder, took on the name Liviu Librescu AZA, in honor of the Holocaust survivor who used his body to barricade Cho from entering his room.

On September 4, 2009, the Marching Virginians, one of Virginia Tech's marching bands, took a 140-mile (230 km) side trip on their way to the season opening football game against the University of Alabama at the Georgia Dome in Atlanta. The 350-member band, twenty cheerleaders, and members of the Corps of Cadets color guard performed at Lakeside High School, alma mater of Ryan C. Clark, along with the Lakeside Marching Band and visiting Evans High's band. The event was organized by the Central Savannah River Area Virginia Tech alumni chapter to honor Clark's memory and as a fundraiser for a scholarship in his name.

Following the shootings, Virginia Tech began employing an alert system on their website and text messages to warn students of danger. The alert system was first activated in 2008 when an exploded cartridge from a nail gun produced sounds similar to gunfire near a campus dormitory. It was again activated on August 4, 2011, when children attending a summer class reported a man carrying a handgun; police were unable to find anyone matching the children's description. Later in 2011, on December 8, the system was activated again after a police officer was shot and killed on campus. This turned out to be a random act by a part-time Radford University student who had carjacked a Mercedes SUV earlier in the day in nearby Radford and had parked it in the general area of a Virginia Tech parking lot, where the officer was conducting a routine traffic stop on a third party. The shooter turned the gun on himself a half-hour later.

==== Anniversary activities ====
Beginning with the first anniversary of the attack and continuing since, the Queens' Guard of The College of William & Mary, another public university in Virginia, has memorialized the victims with an honor guard at the head of the College's Sunken Garden. The honor guard is modeled after the honor guard posted at the Tomb of the Unknowns by soldiers of the United States Army's Old Guard.

Several organizations have hosted annual blood drives on or near the anniversary date of the shooting as a tribute to the victims. The Virginia Tech Alumni Association National Capital Region Chapter (the "DC Hokies") has held a yearly blood drive in remembrance of the victims of the shooting, as well as sponsoring a local 3.2-mile (5.1 km) "3.2 for 32" run on or near the anniversary. The Shenandoah Chapter of the Virginia Tech Alumni Association also hosts an annual blood drive. Other blood drives are held by the Virginia Tech Corps of Cadets and other chapters of the Virginia Tech Alumni Association, under the name "Virginia Tech for life".

Virginia Tech holds a yearly Day of Remembrance for the attack, with events such as a candle lighting ceremony, a wreath laying, a moment of silence at 9:43 a.m., and a Cadet Guard at the Memorial for thirty-two minutes.

== Criticism of university response ==
University of Waterloo sociology professor Kenneth Westhues criticized both the university's response to the shootings and the Massengill Report. Westhues identified the cause of the shootings as a mobbing Cho had experienced in the Virginia Tech English department and suggested that the explanation for Cho's actions should go beyond what he calls the "defective character" explanation:

A more truthful (and therefore more useful) explanation of the Virginia Tech murders focuses not on Cho's character but on the interaction between it and the situations he was in, not on his personal identity but on the interplay between who he was and how other people treated him.

Westhues cited the experiences of another Virginia Tech student in the same department as being very similar to Cho's. He criticized Virginia Tech and the Massengill Report for failing to advance a fuller explanation of the causes of the shootings, which he suggested should be one of "character-situation interplay".

Novelist Lucinda Roy, the former chair of Virginia Tech's English department, was also critical of the way the university treated Cho as a student. In her book No Right to Remain Silent: The Tragedy of Virginia Tech, Roy recounts how she worked with Cho one-on-one in a poetry tutorial and felt he did not get the help that he needed.

[W]hen Roy approached campus counseling as well as others in the university about Cho, she was repeatedly told that they could not intervene unless a student sought counseling voluntarily. Eventually, Roy's efforts to persuade Cho to seek help worked. Unbelievably, on the three occasions he contacted the counseling center staff, he did not receive a comprehensive evaluation by them—a startling discovery Roy learned about after Cho's death. ... After responding to questions from the media and handing over information to law enforcement as instructed by Virginia Tech, Roy was shunned by the administration. Papers documenting Cho's interactions with campus counseling were lost. The university was suddenly on the defensive.

== Effects on gun politics ==
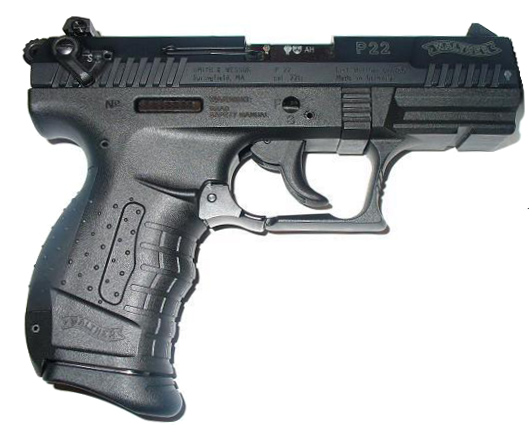
Walther P22, one of the two semi-automatic weapons Cho used in the shooting.

The mass shooting reignited the gun politics debate in the U.S., with proponents of gun control legislation arguing that guns are too accessible, citing that Cho, a mentally unsound individual, was able to purchase two handguns despite state laws that should have prevented such a purchase. Opponents of gun control argued that Virginia Tech's gun-free "safe zone" policy ensured that none of the other students or faculty would be armed and that as a result they were unable to stop Cho.

=== Virginia context ===
Law enforcement officials found a purchase receipt for one of the guns used in the assault among Cho's belongings. The shooter waited one month after buying a Walther P22 pistol before he bought a second pistol, a Glock 19. Cho used a 15-round magazine in the Glock and a 10-round magazine in the Walther. The serial numbers on the weapons were filed off, but the ATF National Laboratory was able to reveal them and performed a firearms trace.

The sale of firearms by licensed dealers in Virginia is restricted to residents who successfully pass a background check; legal permanent resident aliens may purchase firearms. At the time of the shooting, Virginia law also limited purchases of handguns to one every thirty days. That limit was repealed on April 3, 2013, until it was brought back into law on July 1, 2020. At the federal level, the Brady Handgun Violence Prevention Act requires a criminal background check for all firearm purchases from licensed dealers, while the Gun Control Act of 1968 prohibits those "adjudicated as a mental defective" from buying guns. Virginia checks other databases in addition to the federally mandated NICS. This exclusion applied to Cho after a Virginia court declared him to be a danger to himself in late 2005 and sent him for psychiatric treatment. Because of gaps between federal and Virginia state laws, the state did not report Cho's legal status to the NICS. Governor Kaine addressed this problem on April 30, 2007, by issuing an executive order intended to close those reporting gaps. In August 2007, the Massengill Report called for a permanent change in the Code of Virginia to clarify and strengthen the state's background check requirements. The federal government later passed a law to improve state reporting to the NICS nationwide.

=== Campus firearms ban ===
The shootings also renewed debate surrounding Virginia Tech's firearms ban. The university has a general ban on possession or storage of firearms on campus by employees, students, and volunteers, or any visitor or other third parties, even if they are concealed handgun permit holders. In April 2005, a student permitted by the state to carry concealed handguns was discovered in possession of a concealed firearm while in class. While no criminal charges were filed, a university spokesman said Virginia Tech had "the right to adhere to and enforce that policy as a common-sense protection of students, staff and faculty as well as guests and visitors".

In January 2006, prior to the shootings, legislator Todd Gilbert had introduced a related bill into the Virginia House of Delegates, HB 1572, which was intended to forbid public universities in Virginia from preventing students from lawfully carrying a concealed handgun on campus. Virginia Tech opposed the bill, which quickly died in subcommittee. University spokesman Larry Hincker praised the defeat of the bill, stating, "I'm sure the university community is appreciative of the General Assembly's actions because this will help parents, students, faculty and visitors feel safe on our campus."

=== Impact on state and local law ===
In August 2007, the Massengill Report recommended that the General Assembly adopt legislation "establishing the right of every institution of higher education to regulate the possession of firearms on campus if it so desires" and went on to recommend campus gun bans, "unless mandated by law." The report also recommended gun control measures unrelated to the circumstances of the shooting, such as requiring background checks for all private firearms sales, including those at gun shows. Governor Kaine made it a priority to enact a private sale background check law in the 2008 General Assembly, but the bill was defeated in the Senate Courts of Justice Committee. Opponents of gun control viewed this larger move as an unwarranted expansion and as a possible prelude waypoint akin to full gun registration for all gun sales.

The shooting and its aftermath energized student activist efforts seeking to overturn bans that prevent gun holders (both "open carry" and "concealed carry permit" holders) from carrying their weapons on college campuses. Thirty-eight states throughout the U.S. ban weapons at schools; sixteen of those specifically ban guns on college campuses. A new group, Students for Concealed Carry on Campus, formed after the shooting; as of March 2008, it claimed to have 16,000 members at 500 campuses nationwide. Several states considered legislation to allow gun permit holders to carry concealed firearms on university campuses. They cited cases of actual successful neutralization of active campus shooters by armed students to advance their cause. Another attempt by Delegate Gilbert to pass a law to allow concealed weapons on college campuses in Virginia was defeated in March 2008. This law was for the sake of students and faculty members only since the state attorney general ruled that it did not apply to non-students and non-faculty on campus who could carry concealed without restriction on campus. This law would have largely affected students aged 21 years or older, since younger people are not allowed to purchase handguns.

=== Response ===
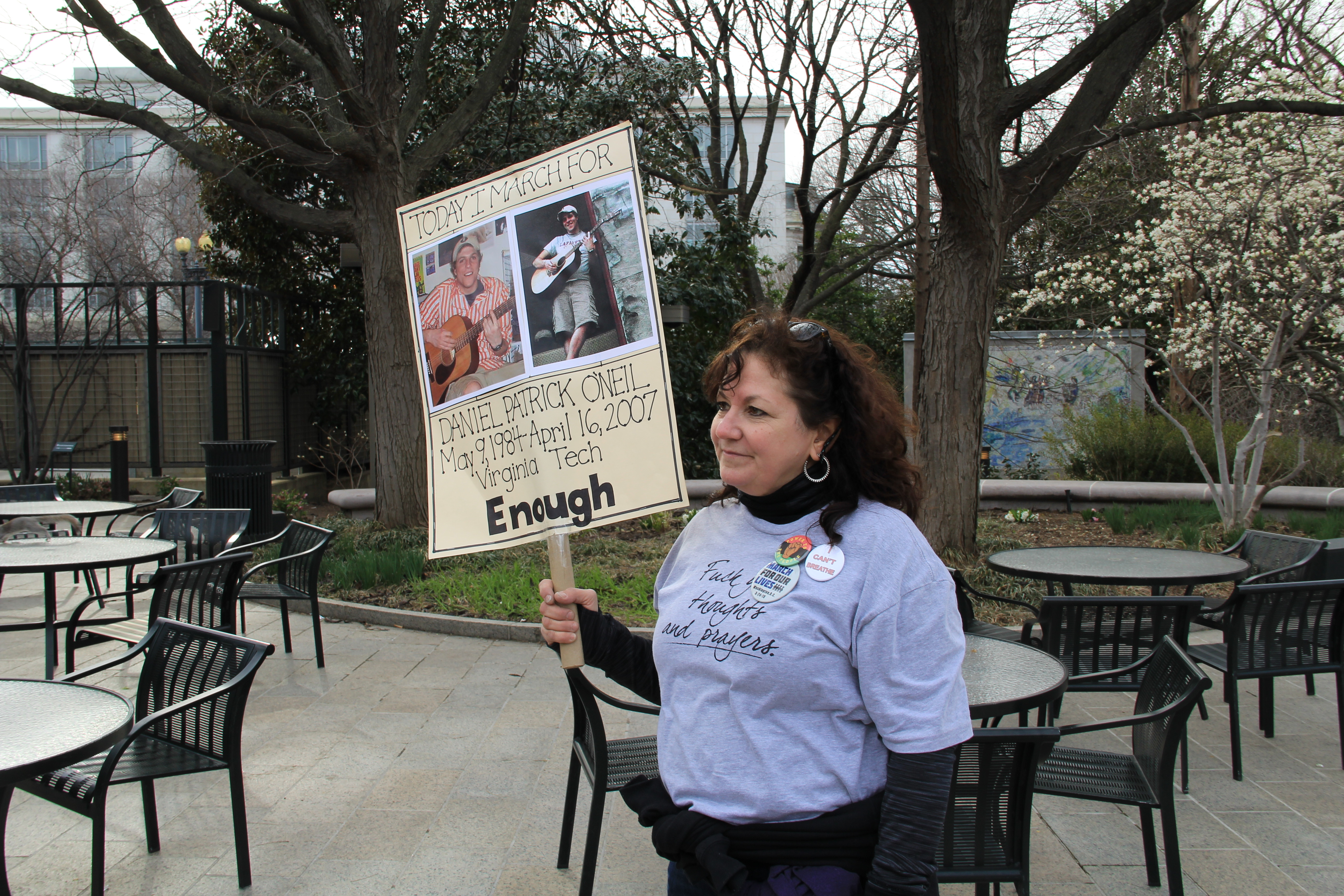
Woman with sign honoring her slain nephew – March for our Lives Washington, DC, 2018

The response to how gun laws affected the shooting was divided. According to a White House statement, "The president believes that there is a right for people to bear arms, but that all laws must be followed". The Brady Campaign said that it was too easy for an individual to get powerful weapons and called for increased gun control measures. NRA board member Ted Nugent, commenting on CNN, called for an end to gun-free zones and contrasted the Virginia Tech shooting with other incidents in which mass shootings have been ended by law-abiding gun owners. Texas Governor Rick Perry proposed that licensed gun owners be allowed to carry their weapons anywhere in Texas.

Some government officials in other countries joined in the criticism of U.S. gun laws and policies. For example, then-Australian Prime Minister John Howard said that stringent legislation introduced after the 1996 Port Arthur massacre had prevented a problematic gun culture in Australia.

Governor Kaine condemned the gun politics debate following the shooting, saying, "To those who want to make this into some sort of crusade, I say take this elsewhere." Advocates opposed to gun control argued that they were merely responding to the crusade by some to use this tragedy as a basis for an expansion of gun control for issues beyond the shootings as perceived to be presented by the Virginia Tech Review Panel. The Review Panel members were:

- Col. Gerald Massengill, Panel Chair, a retired Virginia State Police superintendent
- Dr. Marcus L. Martin, Panel Vice Chair, Professor of Emergency Medicine, Assistant Dean of the School of Medicine, and Associate Vice President for Diversity and Equity at the University of Virginia
- Gordon Davies, former Director of the State Council of Higher Education for Virginia and President of the Kentucky Council on Postsecondary Education
- Dr. Roger L. Depue, an FBI veteran and the founder, past president, and CEO of The Academy Group, Inc., a forensic behavioral sciences services company
- Carroll Ann Ellis, MS, Director of the Fairfax County Police Department's Victim Services Division, a faculty member at the National Victim Academy, and a member of the American Society of Victimology
- Tom Ridge, former governor of Pennsylvania, former Member of the House of Representatives, and the first Secretary of Homeland Security
- Dr. Aradhana A. "Bela" Sood, Professor of Psychiatry and Pediatrics, Chair of Child and Adolescent Psychiatry, and Medical Director of the Virginia Treatment Center for Children at VCU Medical Center
- Diane Strickland, former judge of the 23rd Judicial Circuit Court in Roanoke County and co-chair of the Boyd-Graves Conference on issues surrounding involuntary mental commitment

== Legal aftermath ==
On June 17, 2008, Judge Theodore J. Markow approved an $11 million settlement in a suit against the state of Virginia by twenty-four of the thirty-two victims' families. Of the other eight victims, two families chose not to file claims, while two remain unresolved. The settlement also covered eighteen people who were injured; their lifelong health care needs were included in the settlement.

On March 29, 2011, the Department of Education levied a fine of $55,000 against Virginia Tech for waiting too long to notify students of the initial shootings, in violation of the Clery Act. The fine was the highest amount that the Department of Education could levy. In announcing the fine, the director of a department panel which reviewed the case was quoted as saying, "While Virginia Tech's violations warrant a fine far in excess of what is currently permissible under the statute, the department's fine authority is limited". As of March 30, 2011, the university had announced its intention to appeal the decision. On March 30, 2012, a federal judge overturned the fine, finding that the university did not violate the Clery Act. Ernest Canellos, administrative law judge for the Department of Education, found that Virginia Tech's initial conclusion was reasonable that the initial shootings were a domestic incident and did not represent an ongoing threat, even though that was later proven wrong. Canellos wrote, "This was not an unreasonable amount of time in which to issue a warning. If the later shootings at Norris Hall had not occurred, it is doubtful that the timing of the e-mail would have been perceived as too late."

On September 1, 2012, Education Secretary Arne Duncan reinstated half the fine–$27,500–reversing the decision by Canellos. In the statement released when the fine was reinstated, Duncan wrote, "Although the police department hypothesized that the crime was 'domestic in nature', the record is clear that the respondent had not located the suspect, had not found the weapon, and was confronted with the distinct possibility that the gunman was armed and still at large." Virginia Tech spokesman Larry Hincker issued a statement, saying, "Once again, the higher education community has been put on notice that timeliness is situational and will be determined by department officials after the fact." Duncan agreed to an additional $5,000 fine on January 3, 2014; Federal Student Aid, an office of the U.S. Department of Education, had sought an additional $27,500. An administrative law judge reduced the amount and Duncan agreed to the reduction. At the time, Virginia Tech announced that it was considering appeals on both fines. Ultimately, Virginia Tech paid a total of $32,500 in February 2014, saying it was closing "this chapter on the tragedy of April 16, 2007," without admitting wrongdoing. The announcement that the fines had been paid was made on April 16, 2014, the seventh anniversary of the shooting. A statement by Larry Hincker said, "While we believe that the department's actions against Virginia Tech are inconsistent with their earlier guidance and policy, further litigation was not prudent in light of the various costs—emotional impact on the community, time lost, as well as financial."

On March 14, 2012, a jury found that Virginia Tech was guilty of negligence for delaying a campus warning. The parents of two slain students, Erin Nicole Peterson and Julia Kathleen Pryde, had filed a wrongful death civil lawsuit that argued that lives could have been spared if university officials had moved more quickly to alert the campus after the initial shooting. On October 31, 2013, the Virginia Supreme Court reversed the verdict, citing the trial judge's instruction to the jury that there was a "special relationship" between Virginia Tech and the two students, since they were "business invitees" of the university. In rejecting the decision, the Virginia Supreme Court said that "even if there was a special relationship between the Commonwealth (meaning the state of Virginia, and its affiliated agencies, such as Virginia Tech) and students of Virginia Tech ... there was no duty for the Commonwealth to warn students about the potential for criminal acts by third parties." The state has claimed that ultimate responsibility rested with Cho for not seeking assistance prior to the shooting. The two families had not joined in a previous settlement with the other families.

== See also ==
- List of rampage killers (school massacres)
- List of school-related attacks
- List of school shootings in the United States
- List of school shootings in the United States by death toll
- Mass shootings in the United States
- Northern Illinois University shooting
- Columbine effect
- Murder of Yang Xin
