= Country Music News =

Canadian periodical

Country Music News was a Canadian monthly periodical published in Ottawa by Larry Delaney and Joanne Delaney. It calls itself "The Voice Of Country Music in Canada".

== Overview ==
Country Music News was first published on 1 April 1980. The magazine, published monthly, was started with the name Capital Country News which was changed to Country Music News in 1982. Its mission was to provide Canadian country music artists, songwriters, and the industry with accurate and meaningful print media exposure in Canada and around the world. It was the only national print media serving Canadian country music artists and fans of the genre.

Country Music News established a string of reporters from across Canada, contributing monthly reports on the country music happenings in all parts of Canada. These regular columns were supported by a monthly Nashville country music report as well as in-depth CD reviews, feature articles, industry news, songwriter features, and a "Top 100 Cancountry Hit Chart". Print coverage was supported by dozens of exclusive photos of Canadian country music stars.

After publishing a total of 383 monthly issues Country Music News ceased publication in March 2012.

== Publishers ==
Editor/publisher Larry Delaney is considered an expert on Canadian country music, its performers, and songwriters, and owns one of the most extensive library collections of Canadian recorded country music. Delaney is an eleven-time recipient of the Canadian Country Music Association's prestigious "Country Music Person Of The Year" industry award, was among the inaugural inductees of the Canadian Country Music Hall of Fame (1989), and was inducted into the CCMA's Hall of Honour in 1996.

Joanne Delaney handles some of the creative and administrative tasks of the periodical, and was inducted along with her husband into the Ottawa Valley Country Music Hall of Fame in 1993.
