= Depue, West Virginia =

Unincorporated community in West Virginia, United States

Depue
- Unincorporated community
- Location within the state of West Virginia Depue (the United States)
- Coordinates: 38°51′2″N 81°20′21″W
- Country: United States
- State: West Virginia
- County: Roane
- Elevation: 774 ft (236 m)
- Time zone: UTC-5 (Eastern (EST))
  - Summer (DST): UTC-4 (EDT)
- GNIS ID: 1554294

Depue is an unincorporated community in Roane County, West Virginia, United States.
