= Liviu Librescu =

Romanian-Israeli-American scientist, Holocaust survivor

- ליביו ליברסקו
- Born: August 18, 1930; Ploiești, Kingdom of Romania
- Died: April 16, 2007 (aged 76); Blacksburg, Virginia, U.S.
- Cause of death: Gunshot wounds
- Citizenship: Israel; Romania
- Education: Politehnica University of Bucharest
- Known for: Research in aeroelasticity and aerodynamics
- Scientific career
- Fields: Engineering
- Workplaces: Virginia Tech; Tel Aviv University; Technion – Israel Institute of Technology

Liviu Librescu (Romanian pronunciation: [ˈlivju liˈbresku]; Hebrew: ליביו ליברסקו; August 18, 1930 – April 16, 2007) was a Romanian–Israeli-American scientist and engineer. A prominent academic in addition to being a survivor of the Holocaust, his major research fields were aeroelasticity and aerodynamics.

Librescu is most widely known for his actions during the Virginia Tech shooting, when he held the doors to his lecture hall closed, allowing all but one of his students enough time to escape through the windows. Shot and killed during the attack, Librescu was posthumously awarded the Order of the Star of Romania, the country's highest civilian honor. Coincidentally, Librescu's act of heroism happened on Nisan 27 in the Jewish lunar calendar. That date is Yom HaShoah, which is Holocaust Remembrance Day in Israel.

At the time of his death, he was Professor of Engineering Science and Mechanics at Virginia Tech.

== Life and career ==
Liviu Librescu was born in 1930 to a Jewish family in the city of Ploiești, Romania. After Romania allied with Nazi Germany in World War II, his family was deported to a labor camp in Transnistria, and later, along with thousands of other Jews, was deported to a ghetto in the Romanian city of Focșani. His wife, Marlena, who is also a Holocaust survivor, told Israeli Channel 10 TV the day after his death, "We were in Romania during the Second World War, and we were Jews there among the Germans, and among the anti-Semitic Romanians." Dorothea Weisbuch, a cousin of Librescu living in Romania, said in an interview to Romanian newspaper Cotidianul: "He was an extraordinarily gifted person and very altruistic. When he was little, he was very curious and knew everything, so that I thought he would become very conceited, but it did not happen so; he was of a rare modesty."

After surviving the Holocaust, Librescu was repatriated to Communist Romania. He studied aerospace engineering at the Polytechnic University of Bucharest, graduating in 1952 and continuing with a Master's degree at the same university. He was awarded a Ph.D. in fluid mechanics in 1969 at the Academia de Științe din România. From 1953 to 1975, he worked as a researcher at the Bucharest Institute of Applied Mechanics, and later at the Institute of Fluid Mechanics and the Institute of Fluid Mechanics and Aerospace Constructions of the Academy of Science of Romania.

His career stalled in the 1970s because he refused to swear allegiance to Nicolae Ceaușescu's government. When Librescu requested permission to emigrate to Israel, the Academy of Science of Romania fired him. In 1976, a smuggled research manuscript that he had published in the Netherlands drew him international attention in the growing field of material dynamics.

After months on end government refusal, Israeli Prime Minister Menachem Begin intervened to get the Librescu family an emigration permit by directly asking Romanian President Nicolae Ceaușescu to let them go. They moved to Israel in 1978.

From 1979 to 1986, Librescu was Professor of Aeronautical and Mechanical Engineering at Tel Aviv University and taught at the Technion in Haifa. In 1985, he left on sabbatical for the United States, where he served as Professor at Virginia Tech in its Department of Engineering Science and Mechanics, where he remained until his death. He served as a member on the editorial board of seven scientific journals and was invited as a guest editor of special issues of five other journals. Most recently, he was co-chair of the International Organizing Committee of the 7th International Congress on Thermal Stress, Taipei, Taiwan, June 4–7, 2007, for which he had been scheduled to give the keynote lecture. According to his wife, no Virginia Tech professor has ever published more articles than Librescu.

=== Fields of research ===
Librescu's major fields of study included:

- Foundation and applications of the modern theory of shells incorporating non-classical effects and composed of advanced composite materials
- Foundation of the theory and applications of sandwich type structures
- Aeroelastic stability of flight vehicle structures
- Nonlinear aeroelasticity of structures in supersonic and hypersonic flow fields
- Aeroelastic and structural tailoring
- Dynamic response and instability of elastic and viscoelastic laminated composite structures subjected to deterministic and random loading systems
- Mechanical and thermal postbuckling of flat and curved shear-deformable elastic panels
- Static, dynamic and aeroelastic feedback control of adaptive structures
- Unsteady aerodynamics and magnetoaerodynamics of supersonic flows with applications
- Optimization problems of aeroelastic structural systems
- Theory of composite thin-walled beams and its application in aeronautical and mechanical constructions
- Nonlinear structural deformation of compressible composite materials under shear stress
- Response and behavior of structures to underwater and in-air explosions
- Multifunctional and functionally graded material structures.

== Death and legacy ==
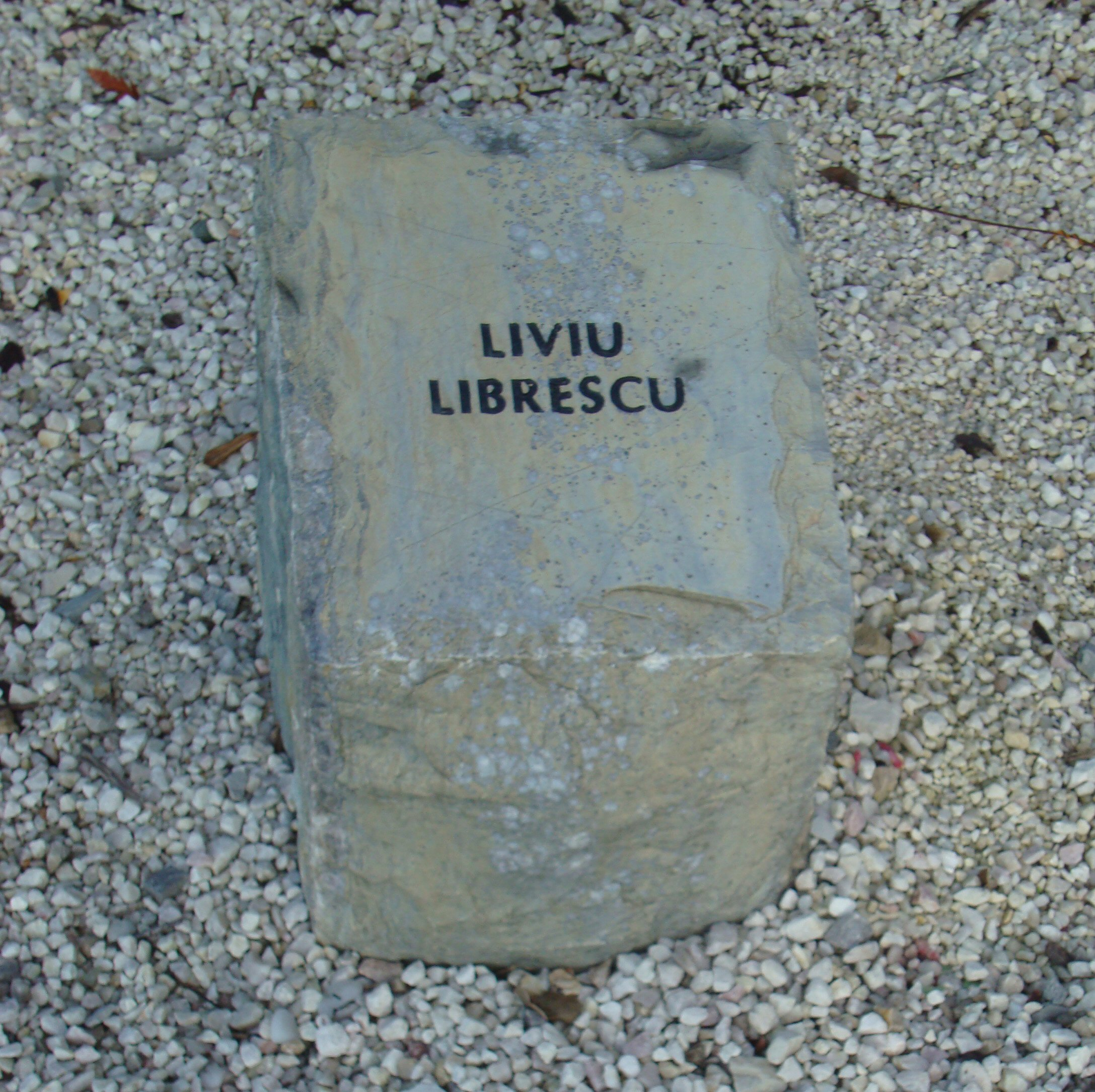
Librescu's memorial stone on the Virginia Tech campus

At age 76, Librescu was the oldest of the 32 people who were murdered in the Virginia Tech shooting. On April 16, 2007, Seung-Hui Cho entered the Norris Hall Engineering Building and opened fire on classrooms. Librescu, who taught a solid mechanics class in Room 204 in the Norris Hall during April 2007, held the door of his classroom shut while the gunman attempted to enter it and yelled to his students to escape through the windows. While the shooter tried to nudge open the door, Librescu managed to prevent him from entering until most of his students had escaped through the windows. After kicking open the window screens, the students successfully escaped. Some suffered leg injuries while landing on the ground two floors below, others survived after landing on the shrubbery just below the window and then ran either to some ambulances pulling up or to the nearest bus stop. Librescu was shot four times through the door, including once through his wrist watch. Of the 23 registered students in his class, Minal Panchal, a grad student from Mumbai, India, was the only student in the room who lost her life, while two others, who were injured while taking cover in a corner, made it out alive. It was then noted that after the armed aggressor forced his way inside the room, he was enraged after the majority of students escaped. Before leaving the room, Cho confronted Professor Librescu and student Panchal who were lying on the ground next to the door and fatally shot them in the temple.

A number of Librescu's students have called him a hero because of his actions. Caroline Merrey, a senior, said she and about 20 other students scrambled through the windows as Librescu shouted for them to hurry. Merrey said, "I don't think I would be here if it wasn't for [Librescu]." Librescu's son Joe said he had received e-mails from several students who said he had saved their lives and regarded him as a hero.

Following the murder of Librescu, at the request of his family and with the assistance of Gov. Tim Kaine, his body was released on April 17 and he received a funeral service at an Orthodox Jewish funeral home in Borough Park, Brooklyn, New York. On April 20, he was interred in Israel where he was buried in Ra'anana's cemetery. In his native Romania, his picture was placed on a table at the Polytechnic University of Bucharest, and a candle was lit. People laid flowers nearby.

The massacre took place on Holocaust Remembrance Day (Yom HaShoah). On April 18, 2007, President of the United States George W. Bush honored Librescu at a memorial service held at the United States Holocaust Memorial Museum, attended by a crowd that included many Holocaust survivors:

That day we saw horror, but we also saw quiet acts of courage. We saw this courage in a teacher named Liviu Librescu. With the gunman set to enter his class, this brave professor blocked the door with his body while his students fled to safety. On the Day of Remembrance, this Holocaust survivor gave his own life so that others may live. And this morning we honor his memory and we take strength from his example.

== Honors and awards ==
Librescu received many academic honors during his work in the Engineering Science and Mechanics Department at Virginia Tech, serving as chair or invited as a keynote speaker of several International Congresses on Thermal Stresses and receiving several honorary degrees. He was elected member of the Academy of Sciences of the Shipbuilding of Ukraine (2000) and Foreign Fellow of the Academy of Engineering of Armenia (1999). He was a recipient of Doctor Honoris Causa of the Polytechnic Institute of Bucharest (2000), of the 1999 Dean's Award for Excellence in Research, College of Engineering at Virginia Tech, and a laureate of the Traian Vuia Prize of the Romanian Academy (1972). He was a member of the Board of Experts of the Italian Ministry of Education, University and Scientific Research. He was awarded the Frank J. Maher Award for Excellence in Engineering Education (2005) and an ASME diploma (2005) expressing "deep appreciation for the valuable services in advancing the engineering profession".

Posthumously, Professor Librescu was commended by Traian Băsescu, the President of Romania, with the Order of the Star of Romania with the rank of Grand Cross, "as a sign of high appreciation and gratitude for the entire scientific and academic activity, as well as for the heroism shown in the course of the tragic events which took place on April 16th, 2007, [...] through which he saved the lives of his students, sacrificing his own life." The Chabad Hasidic Movement named its Jewish Student Center at Virginia Tech after him.

The classroom of the Sara and Sam Schoffer Holocaust Resource Center at Stockton University in Galloway, New Jersey was dedicated to the memory of Liviu Librescu in April 2009 through a donation from The Azeez Family and Foundation of Egg Harbor Township. Jane B. Stark, who is Executive Director of the Sam Azeez Museum of Woodbine Heritage in Woodbine, New Jersey, said "This man, who endured so much during the Holocaust, thought of his students' safety before his own in a time of crisis. ... He deserves to be remembered for these heroic actions."

The street in front of the U.S. Embassy in Bucharest was named in his honor.

Professor Librescu was also awarded the 2007 Facilitator Award by Stetson University College of Law's Center for Excellence in Higher Education Law and Policy.

A gift to Columbia Law School from alumnus Ira Greenstein '85 honored Professor Librescu's heroism during the Virginia Tech shooting and established a professorship in his name—the "Liviu Librescu Professor of Law". This professorship is awarded at the discretion of the Dean, who seeks to appoint to the Librescu Professorship a member of the faculty with an expertise in national security or social justice. Matthew Waxman currently holds the Librescu Professorship. He is an expert in national security law and international law, including issues such as executive power, international human rights and constitutional rights, military force and armed conflict, terrorism, cybersecurity, and maritime disputes.

== Publications ==
Books authored by Librescu include:

- Librescu, Liviu; Ohseop Song (2006). Thin-walled composite beams: Theory and Application. Dordrecht, The Netherlands: Springer. ISBN 978-1-4020-3457-2. OCLC 62363828.
- Cederbaum, G.; Elishakoff, I; Aboudi, J.; Librescu, L. (1992). Random Vibrations and Reliability of Composite Structures. Lancaster-Basel: Technomic Publishing Co. Bibcode:1992tech.book.....C.
- Librescu, Liviu (1976). Elastostatics and Kinetics of Anisotropic and Heterogeneous Shell-Type Structures. Leyden: Noordhoff International. ISBN 978-90-286-0035-5. OCLC 2092328.
- Librescu, Liviu (1969). Statica şi dinamica structurilor elastice anizotrope şi eterogene (in Romanian). Bucharest: Editura Academiei Republicii Socialiste România. OCLC 17866878.

== See also ==
- History of the Jews in Romania
- Romanian American
- Israeli American
