= Deaths in April 2007 =

The following is a list of notable deaths in April 2007.

Entries for each day are listed alphabetically by surname. A typical entry lists information in the following sequence:

- Name, age, country of citizenship at birth, subsequent country of citizenship (if applicable), reason for notability, cause of death (if known), and reference.

== April 2007 ==
=== 1 ===
- Laurie Baker, 90, British-born Indian architect.
- John Billings, 89, Australian co-developer of the Billings ovulation method.
- Norman Butler, 76, English cricketer.
- Herb Carneal, 83, American sportscaster, radio broadcaster for Minnesota Twins Major League Baseball team, congestive heart failure.
- Driss Chraïbi, 80, Moroccan writer.
- Char Fontane, 55, American actress (Joe & Valerie, The Punisher, Pearl) and singer, breast cancer.
- Ilie Greavu, 69, Romanian footballer and Olympian (1964).
- Shiggy Konno, 84, Japanese rugby union player (national team).
- Lou Limmer, 82, American baseball player (Philadelphia Athletics).
- Salem Ludwig, 91, American actor (Unfaithful, Family Business, The Savages).
- Sally Merchant, 88, Canadian broadcaster and politician, cancer.
- Hannah Nydahl, 61, Danish teacher of Tibetan Buddhism, translator for her husband Ole Nydahl, lung and brain cancer.
- Screechy Peach, 47, American singer and songwriter, breast cancer.
- Ladislav Rychman, 84, Czech film director, heart attack.
- George Sewell, 82, British actor (Get Carter, Barry Lyndon, Doctor Who), cancer.
- Elliott P. Skinner, 82, American scholar and former ambassador, heart failure.

=== 2 ===
- B. K. Anand, 89, Indian physiologist and pharmacologist.
- William W. Becker, 85, American co-founder of the Motel 6 chain, heart attack.
- Janet Bloomfield, 53, British campaigner, Chair of the Campaign for Nuclear Disarmament (1993–1996), septic shock.
- Satymkul Dzhumanazarov, 55, Soviet Kyrgyz marathon runner and Olympian (1980).
- Jeannie Ferris, 66, Australian Senator, ovarian cancer.
- Henry Lee Giclas, 96, American astronomer.
- Paul Reed, 97, American comedian and actor (Car 54, Where Are You?), heart failure.
- Tadjou Salou, 32, Togolese international footballer, after long illness.

=== 3 ===
- Marion Eames, 85, British novelist (The Secret Room).
- Sir Walter Luttrell, 87, British army officer and public servant.
- Robin Montgomerie-Charrington, 91, British 1952 Grand Prix driver.
- Michael Joseph Murphy, 91, American Roman Catholic prelate, Bishop of Erie (1982–1990).
- Walter Nicks, 81, American dancer and choreographer.
- Thomas Hal Phillips, 84, American novelist and screenwriter.
- Zoltán Pongrácz, 95, Hungarian composer and conductor.
- Bill Robinson, 88, American sailor and author.
- Eddie Robinson, 88, American college football coach (Grambling State University), Alzheimer's disease.
- Burt Topper, 78, American screenwriter, film director and film producer, pulmonary failure.
- Nina Wang, 69, Hong Kong businesswoman and Asia's richest woman.

=== 4 ===
- Matt Aitch, 62, American basketball player (Michigan State Spartans, Indiana Pacers).
- Sivalingam Arumugam, 59, Malaysian politician, heart attack.
- Jagjit Singh Chohan, 80, Indian Sikh separatist leader, heart attack.
- Bob Clark, 67, American film director (A Christmas Story, Porky's, Baby Geniuses), car accident.
- Brian Fahey, 87, British composer and musical director.
- Reginald H. Fuller, 92, British-born biblical scholar and Anglican priest, complications of a broken hip.
- Terry Hall, 80, British ventriloquist and children's television presenter.
- Edward Mallory, 76, American television actor (Days of Our Lives).
- Karen Spärck Jones, 71, British professor emeritus of Computers and Information at the University of Cambridge, cancer.
- Margaret Tor-Thompson, 44, Liberian politician, breast cancer.

=== 5 ===
- Maria Gripe, 83, Swedish author.
- Thomas Stoltz Harvey, 94, American pathologist.
- Leela Majumdar, 99, Indian Bengali language children's author.
- Mark St. John, 51, American guitarist (KISS, White Tiger), brain hemorrhage.
- Ali Sriti, 88, Tunisian oudist.
- Darryl Stingley, 55, American football player, bronchial pneumonia.
- Poornachandra Tejaswi, 68, Indian writer and novelist in the Kannada language, cardiac arrest.

=== 6 ===
- Ed Bahr, 87, American baseball player (Pittsburgh Pirates).
- Elward Thomas Brady Jr., 60, American businessman and politician.
- Luigi Comencini, 90, Italian film director.
- Stan Daniels, 72, Canadian writer and producer (Taxi, The Mary Tyler Moore Show, The Tonight Show Starring Johnny Carson), heart failure.
- Colin Graham, 75, British opera, theatre and television director, cardiac arrest.
- George C. Jenkins, 98, American production designer (All the President's Men, Sophie's Choice, Presumed Innocent), Oscar winner (1977), heart failure.
- Jill McGown, 59, British mystery writer.
- James McGuinness, 81, British priest, Bishop of Nottingham (1974–2000).
- Raymond G. Murphy, 77, American Medal of Honor recipient during the Korean War.
- Jeff Uren, 81, British racing driver.

=== 7 ===
- Neville Duke, 85, British World War II fighter pilot.
- Mariano Gonzalvo, 85, Spanish captain of FC Barcelona and international footballer for Spain.
- Johnny Hart, 76, American cartoonist (B.C., The Wizard of Id), stroke.
- Win Hickey, 94, American socialite, politician, First Lady of Wyoming and one of the first woman to serve in the Wyoming Senate.
- Victoriano Leguizamón, 85, Paraguayan footballer.
- Brian Miller, 70, British footballer for Burnley and England.
- Otto Natzler, 99, American ceramics and glazing master, cancer.
- Barry Nelson, 89, American actor (The Shining My Favorite Husband, Airport).

=== 8 ===
- Guillermo Álvarez, 80, Mexican baseball player.
- Charles Bain, 93, Trinidadian West Indian Test cricket umpire.
- Natalia Clare, 87, American ballet dancer and instructor, complications of strokes.
- Herbert J. Hutton, 69, American district judge (United States District Court for the Eastern District of Pennsylvania).
- Asad Amanat Ali Khan, 51, Pakistani singer, heart attack.
- Victor Kneale, 89, Manx Speaker of the House of Keys (1990–1991).
- Sol LeWitt, 78, American artist known for his role in the Conceptualism and Minimalism movements, cancer.
- Bill Mescher, 79, American politician, member of the South Carolina Senate from 1993 until his death, stroke.

=== 9 ===
- Egon Bondy, 77, Czech philosopher and poet.
- A. J. Carothers, 75, American playwright and television writer, cancer.
- Bob Coats, 82, British economic historian.
- Alain Etchegoyen, 55, French philosopher, cancer.
- Sir Michael Fox, 85, British judge, Lord Justice of Appeal (1981–1992).
- Dorrit Hoffleit, 100, American research astronomer, cancer.
- Philip Mayne, 107, English officer, last surviving British officer of World War I.
- Harry Rasky, 78, Canadian documentary film producer, heart failure.

=== 10 ===
- Kevin Crease, 70, Australian television newsreader, cancer.
- Walter Hendl, 90, American conductor, heart and lung disease.
- Ralph Heywood, 85, American football player.
- Dick Kryhoski, 82, American baseball player.
- Awdy Kulyýew, 70, Turkmen exiled politician and Foreign Minister (1990–1992), complications from stomach surgery.
- George Mussallem, 99, Canadian politician and businessman.
- Salvatore Scarpitta, 88, American sculptor, complications from diabetes.
- Dakota Staton, 76, American jazz vocalist, after long illness.

=== 11 ===
- Roscoe Lee Browne, 84, American actor (The Cosby Show, Soap, Babe), Emmy winner (1986), stomach cancer.
- James Lee Clark, 38, American murderer, execution by lethal injection.
- Sidney Gordon, 89, Scottish-born Hongkonger businessman.
- Loïc Leferme, 36, French free diver, drowning.
- Warren E. Preece, 85, American editor of Encyclopædia Britannica (1964–1975), heart failure.
- Ronald Speirs, 86, American World War II commanding officer of Easy Company, 506th Infantry Regiment.
- Warren Strelow, 73, American ice hockey goaltending coach for 1980 Winter Olympics gold medal team (Miracle on Ice).
- Kurt Vonnegut, 84, American novelist (Slaughterhouse-Five) and social critic, brain injury from a fall.

=== 12 ===
- Mohammed Awad, Iraqi politician, member of the Council of Representatives, bombing.
- Américo Ferreira, 73, Brazilian Olympic weightlifter (1956).
- Kelsie B. Harder, 84, American name expert, congestive heart failure.
- Len Hill, 65, British cricketer for Glamorgan and footballer for Newport County.
- James Lyons, 46, American film editor (Far from Heaven, The Virgin Suicides), squamous cell carcinoma.
- Pierre Probst, 93, French children's book author and illustrator.
- Little Sonny Warner, 77, American singer who earned a gold record with "There's Something on Your Mind".

=== 13 ===
- Birgitta Arman, 86, Swedish actress.
- Tove Bruunstrøm, 86, Danish Olympic swimmer (1936).
- Marie Clay, 81, New Zealand world-renowned literacy expert, after short illness.
- Stein Olav Fiskebeck, 51, Norwegian Olympic sports shooter (1992).
- Henryk Handy, 66, Polish ice hockey player and Olympian (1964).
- Nathan Heffernan, 86, American judge, Chief Justice of the Wisconsin Supreme Court (1983–1995).
- Hans Koning, 85, Dutch-born writer and journalist.
- Joe Lane, 80, Australian bebop jazz singer.
- Steve Malovic, 50, American-Israeli basketball player, heart attack.
- Wilma Elizabeth McDaniel, 88, American poet who wrote about the Dust Bowl.
- Neil Pickard, 78, Australian politician.
- Capil Rampersad, 46, Trinidad and Tobago cricketer.
- Joie Ray, 83, American open-wheel and stock car race driver, respiratory failure.
- Don Selwyn, 71, New Zealand actor and director, complications from a kidney infection.
- Marion Yorck von Wartenburg, 102, German World War II resistance fighter.

=== 14 ===
- Ladislav Adamec, 80, Czech communist politician, Prime Minister of the Czechoslovak Socialist Republic (1988–1989).
- Robert N. Buck, 93, American aviator who set several aviation records in his teens, complications from a fall.
- June Callwood, 82, Canadian journalist and activist, cancer.
- Bobby Cram, 67, British footballer for West Bromwich Albion and Colchester United.
- Don Ho, 76, American Hawaiian musician and entertainer, heart failure.
- Jim Jontz, 55, American congressman from Indiana (1987–1993), colon cancer.
- Alexandru Karikaș, 75, Romanian footballer.
- Meredith Kline, 84, American theologian and Old Testament scholar.
- William Menster, 94, American Catholic priest, first member of the clergy to visit Antarctica.
- René Rémond, 88, French historian and academician.
- Mike Reynolds, British conservationist.
- Herman Riley, 73, American tenor saxophone jazz performer, heart failure.
- Audrey Santo, 23, American brain-injured girl claimed to have performed miracles, cardio-respiratory failure.
- Jim Thurman, 72, American children's television writer and voice of Sesame Street's "Teeny Little Super Guy", illness.
- Mike Webb, 51, American radio personality, stabbed.
- Frank Westheimer, 95, American chemist.

=== 15 ===
- Patricia Buckley, 80, Canadian-born socialite and fundraiser, wife of William F. Buckley, Jr., infection after long illness.
- Paul Faucher, 87, French Olympic long jumper (1952).
- Heo Se-uk, 54, South Korean protester against U.S.-Korea Free Trade Agreement, septic shock following self-immolation burns.
- Alex Homberger, 94, Swiss rower and Olympian (1936).
- Brant Parker, 86, American cartoonist (The Wizard of Id).
- Justine Saunders, 54, Australian actress, cancer.
- J. Alan Thomas, 56, American actor.
- Peter Tsiamalili, 54, Papua New Guinean first administrator of the Autonomous Region of Bougainville.
- Donald Tuzin, 62, American anthropologist and leading authority on Melanesian culture, pulmonary hypertension.

=== 16 ===
- Frank Bateson, 97, New Zealand astronomer and writer.
- Tran Bach Dang, 81, Vietnamese journalist and politician.
- Robert Desbats, 85, French cyclist.
- Gaétan Duchesne, 44, Canadian NHL player (1981–1995), heart attack.
- Robert Jones, 56, British Conservative politician (MP 1983–1997), minister in the government of John Major, liver cancer.
- Bolesław Kolasa, 86, Polish ice hockey player and Olympian (1948).
- Maria Lenk, 92, Brazilian Olympic swimmer (1932, 1936), rupture of aortic aneurysm.
- Jack Wiebe, 70, Canadian politician, Lieutenant Governor of Saskatchewan (1994–2000), Senator (2000–2004), lung cancer.
- Notable people killed in Virginia Tech shooting:
  - Jamie Bishop, 35, Canadian instructor of German, shot.
  - Seung-Hui Cho, 23, South Korean mass murderer and student, suicide by gunshot.
  - Jocelyne Couture-Nowak, 49, Canadian instructor of French, shot.
  - Kevin Granata, 45, American associate professor of engineering, shot.
  - Liviu Librescu, 76, Romanian-born professor of engineering, Holocaust survivor, shot.
  - G. V. Loganathan, 50, Indian-born professor of engineering, shot.

=== 17 ===
- Nair Bello, 75, Brazilian actress, heart failure.
- Bill Blackburn, 84, American football player (Chicago Cardinals).
- Archie Campbell, 65, Canadian jurist.
- Kitty Carlisle, 96, American actress (A Night at the Opera), TV personality (To Tell the Truth) and singer, heart failure.
- James B. Davis, 90, American founder of The Dixie Hummingbirds, heart failure.
- Steven Derounian, 89, Bulgarian-born American Republican Representative from New York state (1953–1965).
- Len Fitzgerald, 76, Australian footballer, cancer.
- Bruce Haslingden, 84, Australian Olympic cross-country skier (1952), staphylococcus infection.
- Raymond Kaelbel, 75, French international footballer.
- Leyly Matine-Daftary, 70, Iranian artist.
- Chauncey Starr, 95, American electrical engineer, pioneer in the field of nuclear energy.
- Glenn Sutton, 69, American country songwriter and record producer, heart attack.

=== 18 ===
- Michal Benedikovič, 83, Slovak footballer.
- Josy Gyr-Steiner, 57, Swiss politician.
- Iccho Itoh, 61, Japanese mayor of Nagasaki, shooting.
- Andrej Kvašňák, 70, Slovak footballer, lung cancer.
- Harry Miller, 83, American baseball player.
- Alvin Roth, 92, American contract bridge champion.
- Donald Stephens, 79, American long-serving mayor of Rosemont, Illinois, founder of Hummel figurine museum, stomach cancer.
- Tony Suarez, 51, American soccer player (Carolina Lightnin', Cleveland Force), 1981 Rookie of the Year
- Dick Vosburgh, 77, American-born comedy writer and lyricist, cancer.

=== 19 ===
- Ken Albers, 82, American singer (The Four Freshmen).
- Anthony Brooks, 85, British agent who led French Resistance saboteurs after the Normandy Invasion, stomach cancer.
- Jean-Pierre Cassel, 74, French actor, cancer.
- Dermot Chichester, 7th Marquess of Donegall, 91, Irish soldier and aristocrat.
- Bill Good, 96, American weightlifter and Olympian (1932, 1936).
- Marie Hicks, 83, American civil rights activist, complications from Parkinson's disease.
- George Logie-Smith, 92, Australian musician.
- Worth McDougald, 82, American journalism educator, Director of the Peabody Awards (1963–1991), heart failure.
- Bohdan Paczyński, 67, Polish astrophysicist, brain tumor.
- Leszek Suski, 77, Polish Olympic fencer.
- Helen Walton, 87, American widow of Wal-Mart founder Sam Walton, natural causes.
- George D. Webster, 61, American football player.

=== 20 ===
- Yehuda Meir Abramowicz, 92, Israeli General Secretary of Agudat Israel (1972–1981).
- Audrey Fagan, 44, Irish-born Australian Federal Police assistant commissioner, suspected suicide by hanging.
- Fred Fish, 54, American computer programmer known for GNU Debugger.
- Michael Fu Tieshan, 75, Chinese Patriotic Catholic Association bishop of Beijing, cancer.
- George Hays, 82, American football player (Pittsburgh Steelers, Green Bay Packers).
- Andrew Hill, 75, American jazz pianist and composer, lung cancer.
- Jan Kociniak, 69, Polish actor.
- William Phillips, 60, American engineer, Johnson Space Center shooting gunman, suicide by gunshot.
- Robert Rosenthal, 89, American distinguished World War II pilot and lawyer, multiple myeloma.

=== 21 ===
- Åke Carlsson, 70, Swedish Olympic wrestler (1960).
- Stanisław Dragan, 65, Polish Olympic boxer (1968).
- Boscoe Holder, 85, Trinidadian dancer, choreographer and painter.
- George Howard Jr., 82, American federal judge.
- James Kauluma, 75, Namibian bishop and freedom fighter, prostate cancer.
- Hank Lefkowitz, 83, American basketball player (Cleveland Rebels).
- C. Bruce Littlejohn, 93, American jurist, Chief Justice of South Carolina.
- Lobby Loyde, 65, Australian rock guitarist (Billy Thorpe & the Aztecs), lung cancer.
- Parry O'Brien, 75, American shot put champion at the 1952 and 1956 Olympics, heart attack.
- Art Saaf, 85, American comic book artist (Sheena, Queen of the Jungle), Parkinson's disease.
- Bruce Van Sickle, 90, American federal judge (1971–2002), Alzheimer's disease.
- Don White, 81, English rugby union player and coach.

=== 22 ===
- Ruth Frankenberg, 49, British sociologist, lung cancer.
- Sir Raymond Hoffenberg, 84, South African-born endocrinologist, President of RCP (1983–1989) and Chair of the BHF.
- Karl Holzamer, 100, German founder and director-general of TV channel ZDF.
- Juanita Millender-McDonald, 68, American Democratic Representative (Calif.), Chair of House Administration Committee, cancer.
- Conchita Montenegro, 94, Spanish actress.
- Anne Pitoniak, 85, American actress (Picnic, 'night, Mother, Unfaithful), cancer.

=== 23 ===
- Walter Bareiss, 87, German-American art collector, heart failure.
- Tony Bridge, 92, British Anglican priest, Dean of Guildford (1968–1986).
- Paul Erdman, 74, American economist, banker, and writer.
- David Halberstam, 73, American Pulitzer Prize-winning journalist and author, car accident.
- John Berne Hannum, 92, American district judge (United States District Court for the Eastern District of Pennsylvania).
- Axel Madsen, 77, American biographer, pancreatic cancer.
- Michael Smuin, 68, American ballet dancer, choreographer and director, heart attack.
- Boris Yeltsin, 76, Russian politician, first President of the Russian Federation (1991–1999), heart failure.

=== 24 ===
- Warren Avis, 91, American founder of Avis Rent a Car System and real estate developer.
- Ida R. Hoos, 94, American sociologist and critic of systems analysis, pneumonia.
- Roy Jenson, 80, Canadian actor (Chinatown, Soylent Green, The Way We Were), cancer.
- Jim Moran, 88, American automotive dealer and philanthropist.
- James Richards, 58, American veterinarian and feline expert, motorcycle accident while avoiding a cat.
- Kate Walsh, 60, Irish Progressive Democrat senator.
- Robert M. Warner, 79, American archivist who led the National Archives and Records Administration, heart attack.

=== 25 ===
- Edward Astley, 22nd Baron Hastings, 95, British landowner and politician.
- Alan Ball Jr., 61, British footballer, youngest member of England's 1966 World Cup-winning team, heart attack.
- Barbara Blida, 57, Polish politician, suicide by gunshot.
- Polly Hill, 100, American horticulturist, founder of Polly Hill Arboretum.
- Les Jackson, 86, British cricketer, (Derbyshire and England).
- Kashmir Singh Katoch, 91, Indian general.
- Arthur Milton, 79, British sportsman, last person to play both football and cricket for England, heart attack.
- Johnny Perkins, 54, American National Football League player for the New York Giants, complications following heart surgery
- Bobby Pickett, 69, American one-hit wonder singer ("Monster Mash"), leukemia.
- Edgar Wisniewski, 76, German architect.

=== 26 ===
- Ardhendu Das, 96, Indian cricketer.
- Florea Dumitrache, 59, Romanian football player, digestive hemorrhage.
- Wolfgang Gewalt, 78, German zoologist, director of the Duisburg Zoo (1966–1993).
- Lindsey Hughes, 57, British professor of Russian History at University College London, cancer.
- Henry LeTang, 91, American choreographer.
- Jack Valenti, 85, American president of the Motion Picture Association of America (1966–2004), complications of stroke.

=== 27 ===
- Al Hunter Ashton, 49, English actor and scriptwriter, heart failure.
- Svatopluk Beneš, 89, Czech actor.
- Karel Dillen, 81, Belgian politician, founder of the Flemish Interest party.
- Bill Forester, 74, American NFL football player (Green Bay Packers).
- Magda Gerber, 90s, Hungarian-born American educator.
- Raymond Guégan, 85, French cyclist.
- Kirill Lavrov, 81, Russian actor, after long illness.
- Mstislav Rostropovich, 80, Russian cellist and conductor, intestinal cancer.
- Robert E. Webber, 73, American scholar and author on Christian worship renewal, pancreatic cancer.

=== 28 ===
- Belinda Bidwell, 71, Gambian politician, Speaker of the National Assembly.
- Lloyd Crouse, 88, Canadian politician, Progressive Conservative MP (1957–1988), Lieutenant Governor of Nova Scotia (1989–1994).
- Luigi Filippo D'Amico, 82, Italian film director.
- Jim Davidson, 64, Irish rugby union player (Ulster, national team).
- Dabbs Greer, 90, American actor (The Green Mile, Little House on the Prairie, Invasion of the Body Snatchers).
- Sir Anthony Lambert, 96, British diplomat.
- René Mailhot, 64, Canadian journalist for Radio-Canada, pneumonia.
- Tommy Newsom, 78, American musician from The Tonight Show, cancer.
- David Turnbull. 92, American materials scientist.
- Carl Friedrich von Weizsäcker, 94, German physicist and philosopher.
- Bertha Wilson, 83, Canadian who was the first female Supreme Court judge, Alzheimer's disease.

=== 29 ===
- Georges Aminel, 84, French actor and voice actor.
- Milt Bocek, 94, American baseball player (Chicago White Sox).
- Octávio Frias, 94, Brazilian publishing magnate, kidney failure.
- Josh Hancock, 29, American baseball relief pitcher for the St. Louis Cardinals, car accident.
- Ed Kryzanowski, 81, Canadian ice hockey player (Boston Bruins, Chicago Black Hawks).
- Donald P. Lay, 80, American judge of the Court of Appeals for the Eighth Circuit (1966–2006).
- Dick Motz, 67, New Zealand test cricketer.
- Joseph Nérette, 83, Haitian judge and politician, President of Haïti (1991–1992), lung cancer.
- Arve Opsahl, 85, Norwegian actor, heart failure.
- Sir George Pinker, 82, British obstetrician and gynaecologist.
- Ivica Račan, 63, Croatian prime minister (2000–2003), cancer.
- Lee Roberson, 97, American founder of Tennessee Temple University.

=== 30 ===
- Edward F. Boyd, 92, American marketing executive at Pepsi who shunned racial stereotypes in advertising.
- Tom Cartwright, 71, British test cricketer for England, complications of heart attack.
- Grégory Lemarchal, 23, French singer, winner of Star Academy France, cystic fibrosis.
- Bernard Marszałek, 31, Polish offshore powerboat racer, 2003 World Champion, 2004 Euro Championship runner-up, asthma.
- Kevin Mitchell, 36, American football player for San Francisco 49ers (Super Bowl XXIX) and Washington Redskins, heart attack.
- Grisha Ostrovski, 88, Bulgarian film director.
- Tom Poston, 85, American actor (Newhart, Mork & Mindy, Up the Academy), Emmy winner (1959).
- Claude Saunders, 95, Canadian rower and second-oldest national Olympic competitor.
- Gordon Scott, 80, American actor who portrayed Tarzan in six films (1955–1960), complications of surgery.
- Zola Taylor, 69, American singer, member of The Platters (1954–1964), complications of pneumonia.
