= Marszałek (surname) =

Marszałek is a Polish surname. It may refer to:

- Franz Marszalek (1900–1975), German conductor and composer
- Rudolf Marszałek (1911–1948), Polish priest
- Lechosław Marszałek (1922–1991), Polish film director
- Andrzej Marszałek (born 1970), Polish rower
- Bernard Marszałek (1976–2007), Polish powerboat driver
- John F. Marszalek, American historian
- Joanna Marszałek-Kawa, Polish lawyer
