= Public Affairs Press =

Mid-20th-century American book publishing company

- Status: Defunct
- Founded: c. 1939; 87 years ago
- Founder: Morris Bartel Schnapper
- Defunct: c. 1985; 41 years ago
- Successor: PublicAffairs
- Country of origin: United States
- Headquarters location: Washington, D.C.
- Key people: Morris Bartel Schnapper
- Fiction genres: Nonfiction

Public Affairs Press (c. 1939 – mid-1980s) was a book publisher in Washington, D.C., owned and often edited by Morris Bartel Schnapper (1912–1999).

== History ==
According to notional successor Peter Osnos of the 1997-founded PublicAffairs:

For fifty years, the banner of Public Affairs Press was carried by its owner, Morris B. Schnapper, who published Gandhi, Nasser, Toynbee, Truman, and about 1,500 other authors... His legacy will endure in the books to come.

=== Supreme Court Case ===
In 1961, Pub. Affairs Associates, Inc. v. Rickover, 369 U.S. 111 (1962), was a United States Supreme Court case in which the Court held that the circuit court's decision should be vacated because the facts of the case were too unclear. Remanded to district court to create an "adequate and full-bodied record."

The case concerned whether or not speeches written by Admiral Hyman G. Rickover in the course of his duties to the federal government of the United States were copyrightable. Generally, works of the United States government are not. The case spent nine years in litigation.

After the case was passed back to a district court, the Register of Copyrights, the Librarian of Congress, the Secretary of the Navy, the Secretary of Defence, and the Atomic Energy Commissioners were all added as defendants. The court ruled in Admiral Rickover's and their favor, saying that speechwriting should be considered "private business from start to finish."

=== Ranking ===
In 1983, according to The Washington Post, there were three major book publishers in Washington, D.C.:

1. Acropolis Books, founded 1960 by Alphons J. Hackl (owner of Colortone Press)
2. EPM Publications, founded by Evelyn P. Metzger (formerly a Doubleday representative)
3. Public Affairs Books, founded 1944 by Morris Bartel Schnapper
4. Potomac Books
5. Seven Locks Press
6. Robert J. Brady
7. Reston Publishing
8. Matthew Brady
9. Aspen Systems
10. Congressional Information Service
11. Bureau of National Affairs (BNA)

(Note: Books below under "Works," gleaned from the Library of Congress, show the publisher's name as "Public Affairs Press" as far back as 1940.)

The Post called founder Morris B. Schnapper a "redoubtable gadfly."

=== American Council on Public Affairs ===
In the 1940s, Schnapper served on the staff of the American Council on Public Affairs as executive secretary and editor. The organization had "advisory assistance" in various fields from experts:

- Foreign Affairs: Stephen Duggan, Esther Brunauer, Clark Eichelberger, Max Ascoli, Walter H. Lockwood, Brooks Ebeny, Ralph H. Lutz, Edgar Mowrer, W. C. Johnstone
- Political Science: Kenneth Colegrove, W. Y. Elliott, Ernest Griffith, Lowell Mellett, Frederic Ogg, C. J. Friedrich, William E. Mosher, Ernest K. Lindley, Robert J. Harris
- Economics: Sumner Slichter, Paul H. Douglas, Edwin E. Witte, Leon C. Manhall, G. T. Schwenning, David Cushman Coyle, Arthur E. Burns, Jacob Viner, Eveline Bumi, Herman Somera, George Soule
- Sociology: William Ogburn, R. M. Maciver, Read Bain, Bruce Melvin, Mark May, Willard Waller, Harold A. Phelps, Edward All1worth Ro11, E. S. Bogardus
- Social Welfare: Paul Kellogg, Walter West, Frank P. Graham, E. C. Lindeman, Clarence Pickett
- Labor: John B. Andrews, Leo Wolman, W. Jett Lauck, Hilda Smith, Elizabeth Christman, Willard Uphaus, Marion H. Hedges, Paul Brissenden, Frank Palmer
- Education: George Zook, Clyde Miller, Frederick Redefer, Floyd Reeves, Chester Williams, William G. Carr, Carl Milam
- Latin America: Ernest Galarza, George Howland Cox, Rollin Atwood, J. D. M. Ford, John I. B. McCulloch, Samuel Guy Inman
- History: Guy Stanton Ford, Harry Elmer Barnes, Sidney B. Fay, Richard Heindel, Bernadotte Schmitt
- Public Opinion: Harold Lasswell, Peter Odegard, Delbert Clark, Harold Gosnell, Harwood Childs
- Religion: Henry Smith Leiper; Guy Shipler, Frank Kingdon, L. M. Birkhead, James Waterman Wise

Between 1942 and 1946, the American Council on Public Affairs published seven books through Public Affairs Press:

- Prelude to invasion; an account based upon official reports by Henry L. Stimson, Secretary of War (1944)
- American policy toward Palestine by Carl J. Friedrich (1944)
- Economics of demobilization by E. Jay Howenstine Jr. (1944)
- Job guide, a handbook of official information about employment opportunities in leading industries by Sydney H. Kasper (1945)
- Educational opportunities for veterans by Francis J. Brown (1946)
- Guide to public affairs organizations, with notes on public affairs informational materials by Charles R. Read and Samuel Marble (1946)
- Palestine: problem and promise; an economic study by Robert R. Nathan, Oscar Gass, Daniel Creamer (1946)

== Location ==
According to Library of Congress records, Public Affairs Press had offices at 2153 Florida Avenue, NW, Washington, DC, between 1940 and 1948.

In 1962, Public Affairs Press had offices at 419 New Jersey Avenue SE, Washington DC 20003, DC.

== Legacy ==
In 1997, Peter Osnos, when founding PublicAffairs, asked and received permission from Schnapper to name his new publishing house after Public Affairs Books.

== Works ==
By 1983, the Post reported, Public Affairs Press had published some 1,500 books and pamphlets on political-social-economic and historical topics. In 1983, its current catalog listed 100 titles.

Public Affairs Press often had Washington insiders add introductions and similar materials to its book, e.g., prior to their presidencies, introductions by John F. Kennedy and Lyndon Baynes Johnson.

The most published author was Frederick Mayer (1921-2006), an educational scientist, philosopher, and proponent of global humanism who wrote more than sixty books, including eight with Public Affairs Press.

The Library of Congress has the following nearly 400 books recorded as published in Washington, DC, by Public Affairs Press:

1940s:

- Guide to America; a treasury of information about its states, cities, parks, and historical points of interest (no date)
- Guide to America: pictorial supplement (no date)
- Manual of ancient history by Elmer Louis Kayser. (1940)
- Internal check and control for small companies by M. E. Murphy (circa 1940)
- Progress of Pan-Americanism, a historical survey of Latin-American opinion, translated and edited by T. H. Reynolds (1943)
- Going back to civilian life by the American Council on Public Affairs (1944)
- Cartels; challenge to a free world by Wendell Berge (1944)
- American policy toward Palestine by Carl J. Friedrich (1944)
- Economics of demobilization by E. Jay Howenstine Jr. (1944)
- Industry-government cooperation; a study of the participation of advisory committees in public administration by Carl Henry Monsees (1944)
- Korea: forgotten nation by Robert T. Oliver (1944)
- Surplus war property: official documents of the Office of war information and the Surplus war property administration (1944)
- Prelude to invasion; an account based upon official reports by Henry L. Stimson, Secretary of War (1944)
- Reorganization of Congress: a report of the Committee on Congress of the American political science association (1945)
- National health agencies, a survey with especial reference to voluntary associations by Harold M. Cavins (1945)
- Post-war markets; a guide based upon official information prepared by the Bureau of foreign and domestic commerce, edited by E. Jay Howenstine (1945)
- Job guide, a handbook of official information about employment opportunities in leading industries by Sydney H. Kasper (1945)
- Post-war jobs, a guide to current problems and future opportunities by Press Research, Inc. (1945)
- Washington's dining out guide; forthright notes about the capital's restaurants, hotel dining rooms, night clubs, cafeterias, etc. by Morris Bartel Schnapper (1945)
- Our American neighbors by US Office of inter-American affairs (1945)
- American handbook by US Office of inter-American affairs (1945)
- Enemy Japan by US Office of inter-American affairs (1945)
- Veterans information directory; a guide to national, state, and local agencies through which ex-servicemen can obtain government benefits and private aid in the fields of business, employment, education, agriculture, social service, rehabilitation, etc. (1946)
- Educational opportunities for veterans by Francis J. Brown (1946)
- Endless horizons by Vannevar Bush (1946)
- Palestine: problem and promise; an economic study by Robert R. Nathan, Oscar Gass, Daniel Creamer (1946)
- Guide to public affairs organizations, with notes on public affairs informational materials by Charles R. Read and Samuel Marble (1946)
- Unions and veterans by Anne Ramsay Somers (1946)
- American names, a guide to the origin of place names in the United States by Henry Gannett (1947)
- UNESCO: its purpose and its philosophy by Julian Huxley (1947)
- Dictionary of international affairs (1947)
- Full employment & free enterprise by John Herman Groesbeck Pierson (1947)
- Reason and rubbish about the Negro, a Southerner's view by Elta Campbell Roberts (1947)
- Palestine and the United Nations: prelude to solution by Jacob Robinson (1947)
- Fishery resources of the United States, edited by Lionel A. Walford (1947)
- Book publishing in Soviet Russia; an official survey based upon the data of the All-Union Book Department, translated by Helen Lambert Shadick (1948)
- Mineral resources of the United States (1948)
- Soviet views on the post-war world economy; an official critique of Eugene Varga's "Changes in the economy of capitalism resulting from the Second World War", translated by Leo Gruliow (1948)
- Pattern of Soviet democracy by Georgiĭ Fedorovich Aleksandrov (1948)
- Wool tariffs and American policy by Donald Mayer Blinken (1948)
- Marketing of surplus war property by James Allan Cook (1948)
- Guide to American business directories by Marjorie V. Davis (1948)
- Ideological content of Soviet literature by Aleksandr Mikhaĭlovich Egolin, translated by Mary Kriger (1948)
- Gandhi's autobiography by Mahatma Gandhi (1948)
- Role of the Soviet court by Ivan Terentʹevich Goli︠a︡kov (1948)
- T.V.A. on the Jordan; proposals for irrigation and hydro-electric development in Palestine by James B. Hays (1948)
- Rise and fall of third parties, from anti-Masonry to Wallace by William Best Hesseltine (1948)
- Dictionary of labor economics by Byrne Joseph Horton (1948)
- Dictionary of modern economics by Byrne Joseph Horton (1948)
- British rule in Palestine by Bernard Joseph (1948)
- Ideological conflicts in Soviet Russia by Sergeĭ Mitrofanovich Kovalev (1948)
- Citizen participation in government, a study of county welfare boards by Helen Elizabeth Martz (1948)
- Soviet interpretation of contemporary American literature by M. Mendelson, translated by Deming D. Brown and Rufus W. Mathewson (1948)
- Palestine dilemma; Arab rights versus Zionist aspirations by Frank Charles Sakran (1948)
- Processes of organization and management by Catheryn Seckler-Hudson (1948)
- Truth about communism by Dorothy Thompson (1948)
- Prejudice and property, an historic brief against racial covenants by Tom C. Clark and Philip B. Perlman (1948)
- Economy of the USSR during World War II by Nikolaĭ Alekseevich Voznesenskiĭ (Russian Translation Program of the American Council of Learned Societies) (1948)
- American men in government, a biographical dictionary and directory of Federal officials, edited by Jerome M. Rosow (1949)
- Out of the crocodile's mouth; Russian cartoons about the United States from "Krokodil," Moscow's humor magazine, edited by William Nelson (1949)
- What's doing in ... by Morris Bartel Schnapper (1949)
- Guide to women's organizations; a handbook about national and international groups by Ellen L. Anderson (1949)
- You can't win; facts and fallacies about gambling by Ernest Evred Blanche (1949)
- Western union; a study of the trend toward European unity by Andrew Boyd (1949)
- Control of the public budget by Vincent J. Browne (1949)
- People know best: the ballots vs. the polls by Morris L. Ernst and David Loth (1949)
- Goethe's autobiography, Poetry and truth from my own life, translated by R. O. Moon (1949)
- Atlantic pact by Halford Lancaster Hoskins (1949)
- Short history of the Middle East; from the rise of Islam to modern times by George E. Kirk (1949)
- African mandates in world politics by Rayford Whittingham Logan (1949)
- Realities of American-Palestine relations by Frank E. Manuel (1949)
- Conflicting patterns of thought by Karl Přibram (1949)
- Dictionary of guided missile terms by US Department of Defense, Research & Development Board, Committee on Guided Missiles (1949)
- Truman program; addresses and messages, edited by Morris Bartel Schnapper (1949)

1950s:

- Handy pocket map of Washington, D.C.: including a calendar of important events and historical dates of 1950 (1950)
- Soviet history of philosophy; the outline of a new volume to replace G. F. Alexandrov's History of western European philosophy, withdrawn from circulation as a result of a philosophical discussion organized in 1947 by the Communist Party of the USSR (1950)
- Story of the American automobile; highlights and side- lights by Rudolph E. Anderson (1950)
- Industrial management in the USSR by Artashes Arkadʹevich Arakeli︠a︡n, translated by Ellsworth L. Raymond (1950)
- Documentation by S.C. Bradford (1950)
- Soviet imperialism; Russia's drive toward world domination by Ernest Day Carman (1950)
- Soviet territorial aggrandizement, 1939-1948; an analysis of concepts and methods by Ernest Day Carman (1950)
- Principles of scientific research by Paul Freeman (1950)
- Epic of Korea by Adwin Wigfall Green (1950)
- Careers for young Americans in the Army and after by Reuben Horchow, foreword by Omar Bradley (1950)
- Crimes against international law by Joseph Berry Keenan and Brendan Francis Brown (1950)
- Lost America; the story of iron-age civilization prior to Columbus by Arlington Humphrey Mallery (1950)
- Washington, past and present; a pictorial history of the Nation's capital by Chalmers McGeagh Roberts (1950)
- Vsesoi︠u︡znyĭ leninskiĭ kommunisticheskiĭ soi︠u︡z molodezhi. T︠S︡entralʹnyĭ komitet. Otdel propagandy i agitat︠s︡ii (Young communists in the USSR; a Soviet monograph describing the demands made upon members of the Komsomol organization, translated by Virginia Rhine) (1950)
- Treason; the story of disloyalty and betrayal in American history by Nathaniel Weyl (1950)
- Citizen's handbook of sexual abnormalities and the mental hygiene approach to their prevention; a report of the Governor's Study Commission on Sex Deviates by Samuel W. Hartwell (1951)
- Washington fricassee; photos by Albin R. Meier and others by Morris Bartel Schnapper (1951)
- School and society in England; social backgrounds of Oxford and Cambridge students by Charles Arnold Anderson (1952)
- Philosophy of social work by Herbert Bisno
- Behind the Wall Street curtain by Edward Jerome Dies (1952)
- Dynamics of social action by Seba Eldridge (1952)
- Communism and christianity; their differences and their relation to socialism by Emil Alexander Grefthen (1952)
- Monopoly and social control by William Kirsch (1952)
- White supremacy in the United States, an analysis of its historical background, with especial reference to the poll tax by Raymond Grann Lloyd (1952)
- Historical development of the American flag by William Morgan Markoe (1952)
- American beginnings by Jarvis Means Morse (1952)
- American health directory by Henry Hatton (pseudonym) (for Morris Bartel Schnappes?) (1952)
- Republicanism reappraised by Roland N. Stromberg (1952)
- Understanding that boy of yours by Melbourne S. Applegate (1953)
- Force of women in Japanese history by Mary Ritter Beard (1953)
- Imperial communism by Anthony Trawick Bouscaren (1953)
- Shrines of the Republic: a treasury of fascinating facts about the Nation's Capital by Edward Boykin (1953)
- Iron Curtain and American policy by Kurt Glaser (1953)
- Conflicting faiths: Christianity versus communism, a documentary comparison by Charles W. Lowry (1953)
- Lobbyist for the people; a record of fifty years by Benjamin Clarke Marsh (1953)
- Racial integrity of the American Negro by Alexander Harvey Shannon (1953)
- Struggle for Poland by H. Peter Stern (1953)
- Postage stamps as propaganda by O. Carlos Stoetzer (1953)
- Interstate cooperation, a study of the interstate compact by Vincent V. Thursby, introduced by Carl B. Swisher (1953)
- Telegraphers, their craft and their unions by Vidkunn Ulriksson (1953)
- Freedom from insecurity by Hugo Emil Czerwonky (1954)
- American heroes, myth and reality by Marshall William Fishwick (1954)
- Measurement of marriage adjustment by Robert Martin Frumkin (1954)
- Gandi's Autobiography; the story of my experiments with truth (1954)
- Economic planning under free enterprise by Henry Grayson (1954)
- Germany's moral debt: the German-Israel agreement by Kurt Richard Grossmann (1954)
- Lincoln and the Know Nothing movement by Charles Granville Hamilton (1954)
- Behind the President; a study of Executive Office agencies by Edward Henry Hobbs (1954)
- Ethics of civilization by Arnold Herman Kamiat (1954)
- Free and inexpensive materials on world affairs by Leonard S. Kenworthy (1954)
- Israel: the emergence of a new nation by Oscar Kraines (1954)
- Private credit and public debt by Anatol Murad (1954)
- American influence on Canadian nationhood by Carl George Winter (1954)
- Compulsory voting by Henry Julian Abraham (1955)
- Dixiecrat movement by Emile Bertrand Ader (1955)
- Automation, a new dimension to old problems by George P. Shultz and George Benedict Baldwin (1955)
- Economics of employment and unemployment by Paul H. Casselman (1955)
- Challenge of automation; papers delivered at the national conference on automation by Joseph C. O'Mahoney et al. (Congress of Industrial Organizations) (1955)
- Treaties and federal constitutions by James McLeod Hendry (1955)
- Economics of group banking by Palmer Tobias Hogenson (1955)
- Woman voter; an analysis based upon personal interviews by Earl Roger Kruschke (1955)
- Twilight of the profit motive by Theodore Levitt (1955)
- Life and letters of Mary Emma Woolley by Jeannette Augustus Marks (1955)
- Patterns of a new philosophy by Frederick Mayer (1955)
- Egypt's liberation; the philosophy of the revolution by Gamal Abdul Nasser, introduced by Dorothy Thompson (1955)
- Social services in the school by Jean Richardson Pearman and Albert H. Burrows (1955)
- Tito's Yugoslavia by Eric Lionel Pridonoff (1955)
- Norwegians; a study in national culture by David Rodnick (1955)
- Grand Old Party by Morris Bartel Schnapper (1955)
- Crisis of the cities by Fred K. Vigman (1955)
- Study of public administration by Woodrow Wilson (1955)
- Dynamics of social interaction by Anita Yourglich (1955)
- Government as entrepreneur and social servant by Henry Julian Abraham (1956)
- Juvenile delinquency proneness; a study of the Kvaraceus scale by Joseph Kenneth Balogh and Charles J. Rumage (1956)
- Human relations in international affairs; a guide to significant interpretation and research by Seymour Willis Beardsley and Alvin G. Edgell (1956)
- Labor injunction in Hawaii by Paul Frederick Brissenden (1956)
- Lester Frank Ward in American thought by John Chynoweth Burnham (1956)
- Behind the Bamboo Curtain: the experiences of an American doctor in China by Albert Menzo Dunlap (1956)
- Virginia tradition by Marshall William Fishwick (1956)
- International law and asylum as a human right by Manuel R. Garcia-Mora (1956)
- Contemporary theories of union-management relations by David Charles Greenwood (1956)
- Essays in human relations by David Charles Greenwood (1956)
- Baseball player by Paul Michael Gregory (1956)
- Making democracy work by Francis Hankin (1956)
- Sociology and social work by Arthur Hillman (1956)
- Equality of opportunity; a union approach to fair employment by John Hope, introduced by Hubert Humphrey (1956)
- Ritual and cult, a sociological interpretation by Orrin Edgar Klapp (1956)
- Textbooks on economic thought; an analysis of some of their shortcomings by William Ernest Kuhn (1956)
- Education for maturity by Frederick Mayer and Frank E. Brower (1956)
- Social dynamics of George H. Mead by Maurice Alexander Natanson (1956)
- Government and art, a study of American experience by Ralph Purcell (1956)
- Values of Veblen, a critical appraisal by Bernard Rosenberg, foreword by Max Lerner (1956)
- American Bankers Association, its past & present by Wilbert M. Schneider (1956)
- Guide to great plays by Joseph Twadell Shipley (1956)
- American defense and national security by Timothy W. Stanley (1956)
- New frontiers of rural America by Margery Wells Steer (1956)
- Conservative crisis: England's impasse of 1931 by Harvey Wheeler (1956)
- Rise of the Vice Presidency by Irving G. Williams, introduced by Edward R. Murrow (1956)
- Patterns of social change; a survey of the main ideas of the greatest sociologists by Carle Clark Zimmerman (1956)
- New frontiers of knowledge; a symposium by distinguished writers, notable scholars & public figures by Arnold Toynbee et al. (1957)
- Sweden's foreign policy by Samuel Abrahamsen (1957)
- Shorter work week; papers delivered at the conference on shorter hours of work by the American Federation of Labor and Congress of Industrial Organizations (1957)
- Pioneering in industrial research; the story of the General Electric Research Laboratory by Kendall Birr (1957)
- One house for two; Nebraska's unicameral legislature by Adam Carlyle Breckenridge (1957)
- History of Sino-Russian relations by Tianfang Cheng (1957)
- Veblenism, a new critique by Lev E. Dobriansky, introduced by James Burnham (1957)
- Handbook for Americans by Thomas S. Erlenbach (1957)
- Charles Wesley and his colleagues by Charles Wesley Flint (1957)
- Crisis in higher education by Charles Pinckney Hogarth (1957)
- Enriching family life through home, school and community by Bess B. Lane (1957)
- Increasing the wealth of nations; the quest for economic development by Albert Lauterbach (1957)
- Egypt's role in world affairs by Emil Lengyel (1957)
- Flying high; anecdotes about the airways by Franklin W. Marsh (1957)
- Education and the good life by Frederick Mayer (1957)
- New directions for the American university by Frederick Mayer, introduced by Aldous Huxley (1957)
- Karl Liebknecht, man without a country by Karl W. Meyer (1957)
- Gulf of Aqaba, an international waterway: its significance to international trade by Paul Aldermandt Porter (1957)
- Senate qualifications and contested elections by Charles A. Povlovich (1957)
- Soldiers of the States; the role of the National Guard in American democracy by William H. Riker (1957)
- Supreme Court and State police power; a study in Federalism by Ruth Locke Roettinger (1957)
- Codetermination: labor's middle way in Germany by Abraham Shuchman (1957)
- 101 money making ideas for clubs by Nellie Zetta Thompson (1957)
- National communism and soviet strategy 'by Dinko Tomašić (1957)
- Anatomy of revolution; a condensation of the United Nations report on the Hungarian uprising condensed by Marshall Andrews (1957)
- Southern race progress, the wavering color line by Thomas Jackson Woofter (1957)
- Virginia heritage by Louis Booker Wright (1957)
- Adventures in the world of science by Charles Greeley Abbot (1958)
- Professional politicians; a study of British party agents by George O. Comfort (1958)
- What the businessman should know about the regulation of public utilities by John W. Coughlan (1958)
- Real estate in American history by Pearl Janet Davies (1958)
- What the businessman should know about patents and trademarks by Bartholomew A. Diggins and Robert E. LeBlanc (1958)
- Solving the scientist shortage by David Charles Greenwood (1958)
- Strangest things in the world; a book about extraordinary manifestations of nature by Thomas Robert Henry (1958)
- Behind the sputniks; a survey of Soviet space science by Firmin Joseph Krieger (1958)
- What's happened to our high schools? by John Francis Latimer (1958)
- Waging peace, the Swiss experience by William Bross Lloyd Jr. (1958)
- Budgeting your car by Cyrus A. Martin (1958)
- Ezra Taft Benson, a man with a mission by Wesley McCune (1958)
- Reform of the Office of Lieutenant Governor by Benjamin Nispel (1958)
- What the businessman should know about: Federal taxes and foreign investments by Stanley I. Posner and Herbert J. Allan (1958)
- Profile in black and white; a frank portrait of South Carolina by Howard H. Quint (1958)
- Rise of Khrushchev by Myron Rush (1958)
- Science and education at the crossroads; a view from the laboratory by Joseph William Still (1958)
- D.A.R.; an informal history by Martha Strayer (1958)
- Conformity under communism; a study of indoctrination techniques by Edward Taborsky (1958)
- Business planning for economic stability by Henry Thomassen (1958)
- Culture and personality; a study of four approaches by Samuel Kirson Weinberg (1958)
- Foreign aid reexamined, a critical appraisal by James Wilhelm Wiggins (1958)
- What the businessman should know about Federal regulation of securities by Sidney Willner (1958)
- Soviet influence in Latin America: the role of economic relations by Robert Loring Allen (1959)
- Parties and politics in modern France by Richard William Barron (1959)
- Voice of the deaf; a biography of Edward Miner Gallaudet by Maxine Tull Boatner (1959)
- American funeral; a study in guilt by LeRoy Bowman (1959)
- Growth of democratic government by Delbert Franklin Brown (1959)
- Christians in racial crisis; a study of Little Rock's ministry by Ernest Q. Campbell and Thomas F. Pettigrew (1959)
- Law and civilization by Palmer D. Edmunds (1959)
- Scientific revolution: challenge and promise, edited by Gerald W. Elbers and Paul Duncan (1959)
- U. S. versus the U. S. S. R.; ideologies in conflict by Robert A. Fearey (1959)
- Soviet image of future war by Raymond L. Garthoff (1959)
- Women in banking; a history of the National Association of Bank Women by Genieve N. Gildersleeve (1959)
- Together we stand; new perspectives on French-American relations by Sylvan Gotshal (1959)
- Price of survival by Linwood P. Gould (1959)
- Crisis diplomacy; a history of U.S. intervention policies and practices by Doris Appel Graber (1959)
- Turkey and the world by Altemur Kılıç (1959)
- Conservation fight, from Theodore Roosevelt to the Tennessee Valley Authority by Judson King (1959)
- Challenge to world leadership by Howard Garfield Kurtz (1959)
- Social work and Jewish values: basic areas of consonance and conflict by Alfred J. Kutzik (1959)
- Our troubled youth: education against delinquency by Frederick Mayer (1959)
- What the businessman should know about the Taft-Hartley Act by Thomas Joseph McDermott (1959)
- Gallant Pelham by Charles G. Milham (1959)
- Third parties in American politics by Howard Pervear Nash Jr., introduced by William B. Hesseltine (1959)
- Case for farmers by James G. Patton (1959)
- Freedom of speech by radio and television by Elmer E. Smead (1959)
- New horizons of higher education; innovation and experimentation at Brown University by John Rowe Workman (1959)
- Dictionary of social science by John Thomas Zadrozny (1959)

1960s:

- New horizons for college women, edited by Leo C. Muller Ouida G. Muller (1960)
- Soviet economic warfare by Robert Loring Allen (1960)
- Ordeal of the Presidency by David Cushman Coyle (1960)
- Fit for men by Egal Feldman (1960)
- Soviet coexistence strategy; a case study of experience in the International Labour Organization by Alfred Fernbach (1960)
- Mideast in focus by Norman D. Greenwald (1960)
- Engineering profession and unionization by David Charles Greenwood (1960)
- North Africa, nationalism to nationhood by Lorna Hahn, introduced by John F. Kennedy (1960)
- Scientists in government by Earl Wayne Lindveit (1960)
- Goals of education by Frederick Mayer (1960)
- Gandhi on world affairs by Paul F. Power (1960)
- Toward unity in Africa; a study of federalism in British Africa by Donald S. Rothchild (1960)
- Communism in American politics by David Joseph Saposs (1960)
- Constraint by copyright; a report on "official" and "private" practices by Morris Bartel Schnapper (1960)
- Facts of American life by Morris Bartel Schnapper (1960)
- Federalism in India by Benjamin N. Schoenfeld (1960)
- America and the Russo-Finnish War by Andrew J. Schwartz (1960)
- Powers of the President during crises by John Malcolm Smith (1960)
- For what purpose? by James P. Speer (1960)
- British labor and public ownership by Herbert E. Weiner (1960)
- Negro in American civilization by Nathaniel Weyl (1960)
- Politics and trade policy by Joe R. Wilkinson (1960)
- Methodism's challenge in race relations; a study of strategy by J. Philip Wogaman (1960)
- Your inalienable rights by Philip B. Yeager and John R. Stark (1960)
- New frontiers of the Kennedy administration; the texts of the Task force reports prepared for the President, edited by M.B. Schnapper (1961)
- New Frontiersmen; profiles of the men around Kennedy, introduced by M. B. Schnapper (1961)
- What is a college for? by John D. Millett et al. (1961)
- New frontiers for American youth; perspective on the Peace Corps by Maurice L. Albertson (1961)
- Farmer's dilemma by Stanley Andrews (1961)
- Race relations in international affairs by Robert S. Browne, introduced by Roger Nash Baldwin (1961)
- Taboo: the story of the pioneers of social hygiene by Charles Walter Clarke (1961)
- Role of debt in the economy by Helen J. Cooke (1961)
- Strategy of truth; the story of the U.S. Information Service by Wilson P. Dizard (1961)
- View from the White House; a study of the Presidential State of the Union messages by Seymour H. Fersh (1961)
- Full employment, inflation and common stock by Melvin L. Greenhut (1961)
- Automation in the office by Ida Russakoff Hoos (1961)
- Challenge of coexistence; a study of Soviet economic diplomacy by Milton Kovner (1961)
- High price of pornography by Richard Kyle-Keith (1961)
- From the Marco Polo Bridge to Pearl Harbor; Japan's entry into World War II by David John Lu (1961)
- Robe and the sword; the Methodist Church and the rise of American imperialism by Kenneth M. Mackenzie (1961)
- Pan America in crisis: the future of the OAS by William Manger (1961)
- In defense of American education by Frederick Mayer (1961)
- Toys in America by Inez and Marshall McClintock (1961)
- Free minds, a venture in the philosophy of democracy by Ralph Waldo Nelson (1961)
- How to successfully operate a knitting shop by Sonna Noble and Theodore H. Levin (1961)
- Race and reason, a Yankee view by Carleton Putnam (1961)
- First Randolphs of Virginia by Roberta Lee Randolph (1961)
- Graphic charts handbook by Anna C. Rogers (1961)
- Seapower in the nuclear age by Anthony Eugene Sokol (1961)
- Ambassadors ordinary and extraordinary by Ernest Wilder Spaulding (1961)
- Forces for freedom by Robert Stanton with Arthur Fitz-Richard (1961)
- World economic development; a program for utilization of full capacity production by Julius Stulman (1961)
- American industrial research laboratories by Frederick Andrew White (1961)
- Rebirth of African civilization by Chancellor Williams (1961)
- Biological forces in world affairs by Adolph Ancrum Williamson (1961)
- Politics of small business by Luther Harmon Zeigler (1961)
- Emergence of the modern regulatory state by James E. Anderson (1962)
- Economics of the postal service by Morton S. Baratz (1962)
- New horizons for American labor by Joseph A. Beirne (1962)
- Americans for Democratic Action: its role in national politics by Clifton Brock, introduced by Max Lerner (1962)
- Europe views America; a critical evaluation by Edward W. Chester (1962)
- These rights they seek; a comparison of goals and techniques of local civil rights organizations by Jacquelyne Mary Johnson Clarke (1962)
- Wall Street's shady side by Frank Cormier, introduced by Ferdinand Pecora (1962)
- Struggle for supremacy; the career of General Fred C. Ainsworth by Mabel E. Deutrich (1962)
- Religion in American public schools by Richard B. Dierenfield (1962)
- American right wing by Ralph Eugene Ellsworth (1962)
- Strategy of disarmament by Henry W. Forbes (1962)
- Hazards of atomic wastes; perspectives and proposals on oceanic disposal by Alton Frye (1962)
- New forces in Africa, edited by William H. Lewis (1962)
- Responsibilities of man by Rosalie Borisow Gerber (1962)
- National aeronautics and space act; a study of the development of public policy by Alison Griffith, introduced by Lyndon B. Johnson (1962)
- Strangers in our midst; problems of the homosexual in American society by Alfred A. Gross (1962)
- Emerging Colombia by John Merlin Hunter (1962)
- New perspectives for education by Frederick Mayer (1962)
- Peerless patriots; organized veterans and the spirit of Americanism by Rodney G. Minott (1962)
- Channels of learning; the story of educational television by John Walker Powell (1962)
- Ku Klux Klan in American politics by Arnold S. Rice (1962)
- Project Plowshare, the development of the peaceful uses of nuclear explosions by Ralph Sanders, foreword by Willard F. Libby (1962)
- Truth about Soviet lies by Roland Herbert Shackford (1962)
- Wonders of nature, as seen and described by Alexandre Dumas by Esther Singleton (1962)
- Living overseas by Louise Winfield (1962)
- Educational goals for America by Norman Woelfel (1962)
- American immigration policies, a history by Marion Tinsley Bennett (1962)
- National purpose; ideology and ambivalence in America by Leonard G. Benson (1962)
- Party loyalty; the election process in South Carolina by Douglas Carlisle (1962)
- Alliance for Progress: a critical appraisal, edited by William Manger (1963)
- Emerging Africa, edited by William H. Lewis (1963)
- Union member's handbook by Albert S. Herrera (1963)
- Freedom of speech and press in America by Edward Gerard Hudon, foreword by William O. Douglas, introduced by Morris L. Ernst (1963)
- Weights and measures: an informal guide by Stacy V. Jones (1963)
- American learned societies by Joseph Charles Kiger (1963)
- Democracy and the law by Leon Ray Lewis (1963)
- Greater dead than alive by Curtis Daniel MacDougall (1963)
- Moslem nationalism in India and Pakistan by Hafeez Malik (1963)
- Keys to success in school by Leslie J. Nason (1963)
- Parents and the school; a guide to cooperation in child development by Charles Everand Reeves (1963)
- Religion for our times by Buel Trowbridge (1963)
- Dictionary of United States military terms (1963)
- Lincoln's boyhood; a chronicle of his Indiana years by Francis Marion Van Natter (1963)
- Washington Conference on Business-Government Relations in Marketing (1963)
- Preface to peace; the United Nations and the Arab-Israel armistice system by David Brook (1963)
- For humanity's sake by Clyde E. Buckingham (1963)
- Helping human beings by Earl C. Dahlstrom (1963)
- Evolution of money by Rupert J. Ederer (1964)
- Economic policy and war potential by Max E. Fieser (1964)
- Goldwater either by Barry M. Goldwater (1964)
- How to help adults with aphasia by Thomas Douglas Houchin and Phyllis Janes DeLano (1964)
- Bachelors are people too by Frederic Nelson (1964)
- Nuclear secrecy and foreign policy by Harold L. Nieburg, introduced by Hans J. Morgenthau (1964)
- Presidents and the press, Truman to Johnson by James E. Pollard (1964)
- Frontier life in Oklahoma by Allie B. Wallace (1964)
- Campaigning for President; a new look at the road to the White House by Marvin R. Weisbord (1964)
- American support of free elections abroad by Theodore Paul Wright, Jr. (1964)
- Communications-electronics terminology handbook; a manual of definitions, abbreviations, acronyms and designations (1965)
- South and segregation by Peter A. Carmichael (1965)
- Propaganda comes of age by Michael Choukas (1965)
- Avarice, a history by Stanton Arthur Coblentz (1965)
- Thailand and the United States by Frank C. Darling (1965)
- World trade in transition by Virginia L. Galbraith (1965)
- Chinese political traditions by Fu-wu Hou, translated by Franklin W. Houn (1965)
- Anatomy of terror by Nikita Sergeevich Khrushchev (1965)
- Is party line, comrade! by George Lichty (1965)
- Beyond sovereignty by Max Mark (1965)
- Vietnam and the United States by Hans J. Morgenthau (1965)
- Hybrids by David C. Rife (1965)
- Kibbutz that was by Boris Stern, foreword by Isador Lubin (1965)
- American enterprise and foreign trade by Oscar Robert Strackbein (1965)
- Politics of bureaucracy by Gordon Tullock, foreword by James M. Buchanan (1965)
- Regionalism and world order by Ronald J. Yalem (1965)
- Federalism in the Southern Confederacy by Curtis Arthur Amlund (1965)
- Politics of research by Richard J. Barber (1966)
- Chile in transition by Cole Blasier (1966)
- Paradox of man's greatness by Stanton A. Coblentz (1966)
- Presidents are people too by Frank Cormier (1966)
- Lobbyists by James Deakins (1966)
- Peace through negotiation; the Austrian experience by Blair G. Ewing (1966)
- Patterns of community development by Richard Franklin (1966)
- Chaco dispute; a study of prestige diplomacy by William R. Garner (1966)
- Free press and fair trial by Donald M. Gillmor (1966)
- America's Vietnam policy; the strategy of deception by Edward S. Herman and Richard B. Du Boff (1966)
- Group practice & prepayment of medical care by William A. MacColl (1966)
- Strategy for conquest; a study of Communist propaganda techniques by Donald Lane Miller (1966)
- Randolph Bourne: legend and reality by John Adam Moreau (1966)
- Our changing cities by Robert C. Weaver et al. (1966)
- China, Vietnam, and the United States: highlights of the hearings of the Senate Foreign Relations Committee (1966)
- Creative elite in America by Nathaniel Weyl (1966)
- Guide to grants, loans, and other types of government assistance available to students and educational institutions (1966)
- Washington exposé by Jack Anderson (1967)
- Genesis of American patent and copyright law by Bruce W. Bugbee (1967)
- Prairie State politics; popular democracy in South Dakota by Alan L. Clem (1967)
- Action-planning for community health services (1967)
- Guide to opportunities for education, training, and research in the sciences by Stanley Field (1967)
- Lincoln vs. Douglas; the great debates campaign by Richard Allen Heckman (1967)
- Archives & the public interest; selected essays, edited by Ken Munden (1967)
- Race and reality; a search for solutions by Carleton Putnam (1967)
- Changing environmental hazards; challenges to community health; report; National Commission on Community Health Services (1967)
- Health care facilities; the community bridge to effective health services; report (1967)
- Health manpower: action to meet community needs; report (1967)
- Health administration and organization in the decade ahead; report; National Commission on Community Health Services (1967)
- War in Vietnam, prepared by the staff of the Senate Republican Policy Committee (1967)
- Realities of Vietnam; a Ripon Society appraisal, edited by Christopher W. Beal with Anthony A. D'Amato (1968)
- Press and the public interest, edited by Warren K. Agee (1968)
- Liberal in two worlds; the essays of Solomon F. Bloom, edited by Samuel J. Hurwitz and Moses Rischin (1968)
- Politics of community health by Ralph W. Conant (1968)
- Lyndon Johnson's credibility gap by James Deakin (1968)
- Economics of trading stamps by Harold W. Fox (1968)
- America and swaraj; the U.S. role in Indian independence by A. Guy Hope (1968)
- United States-Philippine relations, 1946-1956 by Sung Yong Kim (1968)
- Military occupation and national security by Martin and Joan Kyre (1968)
- President and public opinion; leadership in foreign affairs by Manfred Landecker (1968)
- Quotations from the would-be chairman: Richard Milhous Nixon, edited by M. B. Schnapper (1968)
- Citizen's choice: Humphrey or Nixon by Nelson W. Polsby (1968)
- Political trends in Brazil by Vladimir Reisky de Dubnic, foreword by Adolf A. Berle (1968)
- Roots of international organization by J. William Robinson (1968)
- New mass media: challenge to a free society by Gilbert Seldes (1968)
- President as chief administrator; a study of Franklin D. Roosevelt by A. J. Wann (1968)
- Nuclear proliferation by Walter B. Wentz (1968)
- Community Structure and Health Action; a report on process analysis by Robert N. Wilson with Robert E. Boone (1968)
- Conditions for peace in Europe; problems of detente and security, edited by David S. Collier and Kurt Glaser (1969)
- National priorities; military, economic, and social by Kenneth E. Boulding et al. (1969)
- Frankly speaking; a collection of extraordinary speeches by Spiro T. Agnew (1969)
- Treaty trap; a history of the performance of political treaties by the United States and European nations by Laurence W. Beilenson with Bernard M. Dain (1969)
- Learning through games; a new approach to problem solving by Elliot Carlson (1969)
- Soldier's guide to the laws of war by Morris Greenspan (1969)
- Brass factories; a frank appraisal of West Point, Annapolis, and the Air Force Academy by J. Arthur Heise (1969)
- Gambling and organized crime by Rufus King, introduced by Joseph D. Tydings (1969)
- School prayers; Congress, the courts, and the public by John Herbert Laubach (1969)
- Frankly McCarthy, edited by Carol E. Rinzler, introduced by Leonard C. Lewin (1969)
- Walter Lippmann: philosopher-journalist by Edward L. Schapsmeier and Frederick H. Schapsmeier (1969)
- Reluctant door; the right of access to the United Nations by Leif Kr. Tobiassen (1969)

1970s:

- Plain talk about the word business by Robert Flannes et al. (1970)
- William G. Milliken: A Touch of Steel by Dan Angel (1970)
- Student violence by Edward Bloomberg (1970)
- Peril on the job; a study of hazards in the chemical industries by Ray Davidson (1970)
- Preface to disarmament; an appraisal of recent proposals by Marion H. McVitty (1970)
- Students and decision making; a report by Robert S. Morison, chairman of Cornell's Commission on Student Involvement in Decision Making (1970)
- Story of margarine by S. F. Riepma (1970)
- Foundations; their use and abuse by William H. Rudy (1970)
- Palestine: a search for truth; approaches to the Arab-Israeli conflict, edited by Alan R. Taylor and Richard N. Tetlie (1970)
- Peace Corps and Pax Americana by Marshall Windmiller (1970)
- One life--one physician; an inquiry into the medical profession's performance in self-regulation; a report to the Center for Study of Responsive Law by Robert S. McCleery et al. (1971)
- Pollution of politics; a research/reporting team investigates campaign ethics, edited by Samuel J. Archibald (1971)
- Uncle Sam is watching you; highlights from the hearings of the Senate Subcommittee on Constitutional Rights, introduced by Alan Barth (1971)
- Famous American trademarks by Arnold B. Barach (1971)
- People's instrument; a philosophy of programming for public television by Robert J. Blakely (1971)
- Challenges of change by Walter Cronkite (1971)
- Freedom from dependence; welfare reform as a solution to poverty by Stanley Esterly and Glenn Esterly (1971)
- Fighting progressive; a biography of Edward P. Costigan by Fred Greenbaum (1971)
- Courts for a new nation by Dwight F. Henderson, foreword by Tom C. Clark (1971)
- Engineering of restraint; the Nixon administration and the press; a report of the American Civil Liberties Union by Fred Powledge (1971)
- Money in politics by Herbert E. Alexander (1972)
- Power through subversion by Laurence W. Beilenson (1972)
- Movie rating game by Stephen Farber (1972)
- What you don't know can hurt you; a study of public opinion and public emotion by Lester Markel (1972)
- Public television: a question of survival; a report of the American Civil Liberties Union by Fred Powledge (1972)
- American labor: a pictorial social history by Morris Bartel Schnapper (1972)
- Why President Richard Nixon should be impeached by American Civil Liberties Union (1973)
- Operational conflict analysis by Norman A. Bailey and Stuart M. Feder (1973)
- Eclipse of excellence; a critique of American higher education by Steven M. Cahn (1973)
- Concise encyclopedia of the Middle East, edited by Mehdi Heravi (1973)
- Symbols of the nations by A. Guy Hope and Janet Barker Hope (1973)
- Greece: uncertain democracy by D. George Kousoulas (1973)
- Search for meaning; the autobiography of a nonconformist by John U. Nef (1973)
- Occupational licensing: practices and policies by Benjamin Shimberg, Barbara F. Esser, Daniel H. Kruger (1973)
- Population crisis and moral responsibility, edited by J. Philip Wogaman (1973)
- Language of oppression Haig A. Bosmajian (1974)
- Getting your money's worth; guidelines about insurance policies, health protection, pensions, and professional services by Herbert S. Denenberg (1974)
- Comintern in Mexico by Donald L. Herman (1974)
- Brazil, awakening giant by Philip Raine (1974)
- American symbols; the seals and flags of the fifty States by M. B. Schnapper (1974)
- Conscience of the Nation: the people versus Richard M. Nixon, edited by M. B. Schnapper (1974)
- Presidential impeachment; a documentary overview, edited by M. B. Schnapper, introduced by Alan Barth (1974)
- Constitutional grounds for Presidential impeachment, by the impeachment inquiry staff, Committee on the Judiciary of the U.S. House of Representatives (1974)
- Inflation and monetary crisis: a symposium of the Committee for Monetary Research and Education, edited by G. C. Wiegand (1975)
- What's right? What's wrong?: A psychological analysis of moral behavior by Larry C. Jensen (1975)
- Bronze age civilization: the Philistines and the Danites by Allen H. Jones (1975)
- Minorities in the United States: problems, progress, and prospects by Sar A. Levitan, William B. Johnston, Robert Taggart (1975)
- Political science and political knowledge by Philip H. Melanson, foreword by Max Lerner (1975)
- New horizons for the Third World by Francisco Casanova Alvarez; foreword by Sol M. Linowitz (1976)
- Conversations with Eric Sevareid (1976)
- To save our cities: what needs to be done by Henry S. Reuss (1977)

== See also ==
- Pub. Affairs Associates, Inc. v. Rickover
- PublicAffairs
- International Publishers
