= Norman Butler =

Norman Butler may refer to:

- Norman Butler (polo) (1918–2011), polo player and thoroughbred breeder
- Norman Butler (cricketer) (1930–2007), English cricketer
