= Hafeez Malik =

Pakistani-American political scientist and professor (1930–2020)

Hafeez Malik (Urdu: ڈاکٹرحفيظ ملک) (1930, Lahore – 20 April 2020) was a Pakistani-American political scientist and the professor of political science at Villanova University in Pennsylvania.

== Early life and education ==
Hafeez Malik was born in 1930 in Lahore, Punjab, British India. After a high school education at Mission High School, Lahore, he graduated from Government College, Lahore with a BA degree in 1949. After a year in law college, he came to the US as a student at Syracuse University, where he completed a double master's degree in journalism and international relations, and then a PhD in political science in 1960.

== Career ==
While a student, he also worked for a Pakistani Urdu newspaper as a correspondent. In 1961, he joined Villanova University, where he was working as a professor of political science. From 1961 to 1963, and from 1966 to present, he has been a visiting professor at the Foreign Service Institute of the U.S. State Department. From 1971 to 1974, he was president of the Pakistan Council of Asia Society, New York; director (1973–1988) of the American Institute of Pakistan Studies; and president of the Pakistani-American foundation. Since 1977, he has been the editor of the Journal of South Asian and Middle Eastern Studies (Villanova University, Villanova, Pennsylvania). In 1992, Malik (along with Dr. Sakhawat Hussain) founded the Pakistan-American Congress, and then served as the chairman of its advising council (which was later converted into PAC Board of Trustees).

== Books published ==
1. Russian-American relations: Islamic and Turkic Dimensions in the Volga-Ural Basin (London and New York City: Macmillan), 2000.
2. U.S., Russia and China in the New World Order (New York: St. Martin's Press; London: Macmillan), 1996.
3. Soviet-Pakistan Relations and Post Soviet Dynamics (New York; St. Martin's Press; London: Macmillan), 1996.
4. Central Asia: Its Strategic Importance and Future Prospects (New York: St. Martin's Press; London: Macmillan), 1994.
5. Dilemmas of National Security and Cooperation in India and Pakistan, Ed. (New York: St. Martin's Press; London: Macmillan), 1993.
6. Soviet-American Relations with Pakistan, Iran and Afghanistan (published simultaneously from London, Macmillan and New York: St. Martin's Press), 1987.
7. Domestic Determinants of Soviet Foreign Policy Towards South Asia and the Middle East (London: Macmillan and New York: St. Martin's Press), 1989.
8. International Security in Southwest Asia, Ed. (New York: Praeger Publishers), 1984.
9. Muslim Nationalism in India and Pakistan (Washington: Public Affairs Press), 1963.
10. Iqbal: Poet-Philosopher of Pakistan (New York and London: Columbia University Press), 1971.
11. Sir Sayyid's History of the Bijnore Rebellion (East Lansing: Michigan State University), 1967.
12. Sir Sayyid Ahmad Khan and Muslim Modernization in India and Pakistan (New York and London: Columbia University Press), 1980.
13. Political Profile of Sir Sayyid Ahmad Khan: A Documentary Record (Islamabad, Pakistan: National Institute of Historical and Cultural Research, Quaid-I-Azam University Press), 1982.
14. Pakistan: Founders Aspirations and Today's Realities (Karachi, Oxford University Press, 2001.
15. Hafeez Malik, Yuri V. Gankovsky, Igor Khalevinski, Editors, Encyclopedia of Pakistan.
16. US Relations with Pakistan and Afghanistan: The Imperial Dimensions (Karachi: Oxford University Press 2008).
17. US Relations with Pakistan and Afghanistan: The Imperial Dimensions (Karachi: Oxford University Press 2008).

== Death ==
Hafeez Malik died at his home in Radnor Township, Delaware County, Pennsylvania on 20 April 2020 at age 90.

== See also ==
- Pakistani American
- Pakistani American lobby
