= Public Affairs Associates, Inc. v. Rickover =

- Supreme Court of the United States

Argued November 6–7, 1961 Decided March 5, 1962
- Full case name: Public Affairs Associates, Incorporated, Trading as Public Affairs Press v. Hyman G. Rickover
- Citations: 369 U.S. 111 (more) 82 S. Ct. 580; 7 L. Ed. 2d 604

Holding
- Circuit court decision vacated because the facts of the case were too unclear. Remanded to district court to create an "adequate and full-bodied record.".

Court membership
- Chief Justice Earl Warren Associate Justices Hugo Black · Felix Frankfurter; William O. Douglas · Tom C. Clark; John M. Harlan II · William J. Brennan Jr. Charles E. Whittaker · Potter Stewart

Case opinions
- Per curiam
- Concurrence: Douglas
- Dissent: Warren, joined by Whittaker
- Dissent: Harlan

Public Affairs Associates, Inc. v. Rickover, 369 U.S. 111 (1962), was a United States Supreme Court case in which the Court held that the circuit court's decision should be vacated because the facts of the case were too unclear. Remanded to district court to create an "adequate and full-bodied record.".

The case concerned whether or not speeches written by Admiral Hyman G. Rickover in the course of his duties to the federal government of the United States were copyrightable. Generally, works of the United States government are not. The case spent nine years in litigation.

After the case was passed back to a district court, the Register of Copyrights, the Librarian of Congress, the Secretary of the Navy, the Secretary of Defence, and the Atomic Energy Commissioners were all added as defendants. The court ruled in Admiral Rickover's and their favor, saying that speechwriting should be considered "private business from start to finish."

== See also ==
- Public Affairs Press
