= Frederick Mayer =

American philosopher and educator (1921–2006)

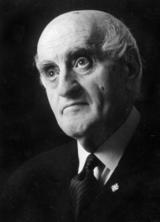
- Born: 11 August 1921; Frankfurt, Germany
- Died: 26 June 2006 (aged 84); Vienna, Austria

Academic work
- Discipline: educational science philosophy
- Institutions: University of Redlands
- Main interests: humanism

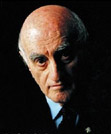
Frederick Mayer

Frederick Mayer (11 August 1921, Frankfurt, Germany – 26 June 2006, Vienna, Austria) was an educational scientist and philosopher of the University of Redlands in California and one of the leading creativity experts. One of his most important aims was a global humanism. He was active as an author, publishing more than sixty books dealing with creativity, education and humanism. Internationally recognized creativity researcher Frederick Mayer in Vienna died. Mayer was particularly affected by the quote "Pride is not for him who loves his country, but for him who loves the whole world."

== Books ==
- "Essentialism" (1950)
- "A History of Ancient and Medieval Philosophy" (1950)
- "A History of American Thought: An Introduction" (1951)
- "A History of Modern Philosophy" (1951)
- "Essentialism - a New Approach to a One World Philosophy" (1951)
- "Ethics and the Modern World;: Towards a One World Perspective" (1951)
- "History of Ancient and Medieval Philosophy" (1951)
- "Ethics and the Modern World; Towards a One World Perspective" (1952)
- "Philosophy of Education for Our Time" (1952)
- "Great Ideas of Education" (1953)
- Patterns of a new philosophy with Frank E. Brower (Washington: Public Affairs Press, 1955)
- Education for maturity with Frank E. Brower (Washington: Public Affairs Press, 1956)
- "New Directions for the American University" (1957)
- Education and the good life (Washington: Public Affairs Press, 1957)
- New directions for the American university, introduced by Aldous Huxley (Washington: Public Affairs Press, 1957)
- "Philosophy of Education for Our Time" (1958)
- "Education for Creative Living" (1959)
- Our troubled youth: education against delinquency (Washington: Public Affairs Press, 1959)
- "A History of Educational Thought" (1960, 1966, 1973)
- Goals of education (Washington: Public Affairs Press, 1960)
- "Creative Universities" (1961)
- In defense of American education (Washington: Public Affairs Press, 1961)
- "Web of Hate" (1961)
- "Man, Morals and Education" (1962)
- New perspectives for education (Washington: Public Affairs Press, 1962)
- "Foundations of Education. Study of Origins & Development of Educational Ideals Including Today's Foremost American Concepts" (1963)
- "American Ideas and Education" (1964)
- "Introductory Readings in Education" (1966)
- "ROAD TO MODERN EDUCATION. GREAT IDEAS OF EDUCATION VOL. 2" (1966)
- "The Great Teachers" (1967)
- "Creative Universities" (1969)
- "Education for a New Society" (1973)
- "Aufforderung zur Menschlichkeit. Erzieherische Weltperspektiven" (1975)
- "Dynamische Erziehung. Alternativen zur Erziehungsreform" (1975)
- "Vorurteil - Geißel der Menschheit" (1975)
- "Einladung zur Tat" (1976)
- "Erziehung zu einer kreativen Gesellschaft" (1976)
- "Schöpferisch älter werden" (1978)
- "Füreinander dasein: Kinder - Familie - Gesellschaft: Chaos oder Gemeinschaft." (1979)
- "Impulse für ein neues Leben. Verwirrung und Verwirklichung" (1979)
- "Kreativität. Illusion oder Wirklichkeit" (1979)
- "Anweisung für eine Flucht nach vorn" (1982)
- "Wahnsinn USA. Von einem, der auszog, die Freiheit zu finden" (1984)
- "...findest du das Tal der Perlen... Gedichte" (1986)
- "Eine Lüge, die uns allen den Tod bringen kann" (1986)
- "Kreativität. Begrenzungen und Möglichkeiten" (1990)
- "Schöpferisch erleben" (1992)
- "Versagen ohne Ende? Kreativität, Bildung und Gesellschaft in globaler Sicht" (1994)
- "Vorurteile bedrohen uns alle" (1995)
- "Vergeudung oder Verwirklichung. Können wir kreativer sein?" (1998)
- "Zwischen Ernüchterung und Erleuchtung. Gedanken und Lyrik" (1998)
- "Der Wert jedes Menschen ist unermesslich" (1998)
- "Lebensziele" (1999)
- "Umdenken" (2001)
- "Sehnsucht nach Harmonie" (2001)
- "Eine neue Bildung für eine neue Gesellschaft" (2001)
- "Mut zur schöpferischen Fantasie: Kreativität entdecken und wagen" (2002)
- "Weisheit der Gefühle. Ideale und Realitäten" (2003)
- "LebensManagement" (2004)
- "Erwartung und Erneuerung" (2005)
- "Vernunft, Glaube und Menschlichkeit" (2005)
- "Erfüllung - Die schwierige Herausforderung in allen Lebensbereichen, besonders im Alter" (2006)
- "Güte als Lebensweise" (2006)
- "Wege zu einem bedeutungsvollen Alter" (2006)
- "Tiefer fühlen und sensibler werden. Die kreative Entfaltung" (2006)
- "Der lange Weg zum Miteinander" (2006)
- "Unser Lebensstil : Möglichkeiten und Irrwege" (2007)
- "Lesebuch" (2009)
- "Eine neue Bildung für eine neue Gesellschaft" (2009)
- "Vorurteil - eine Geißel der Menschheit" (2010)
- "Frederick Mayer - zum Gedenken. Schöpferische Expansion. Können wir kreativer, sensibler, wacher werden?" (Alice Strigl, Hg., 2008)

== Society ==
On 3 July 2007, a society was founded in Vienna, Austria. Its aims are to apply, to propagate and to develop the ideas of Prof. Frederick Mayer: Frederick Mayer Society - International (fmsi).

== See also ==
- Robert Hutchins
- Center for the Study of Democratic Institutions
