= James Richards (veterinarian) =

American veterinarian

James Robert Richards (July 19, 1948 – April 24, 2007) was an American veterinarian who was a noted expert on cats. He headed the Feline Health Center of the Cornell University College of Veterinary Medicine from 1997 until his death.

Born in Richmond, Indiana, he grew up in rural Ohio. He earned a math degree from Berea College in 1970 and his veterinary degree from Ohio State University in 1979. He began at Cornell in 1991.

Richards died in Johnson City, New York from injuries sustained in a motorcycle accident where he swerved to avoid hitting a cat.

== Selected bibliography ==
- ASPCA Complete Guide to Cats (Chronicle Books, 1999)
- The Well-Behaved Cat: How to Change Your Cat’s Bad Habits (Englander Communications, 2001) - editor
- The Cornell Book of Cats (Villard, 1997) - editor

== See also ==
- List of unusual deaths in the 21st century
