= Polly Hill (horticulturist) =

American horticulturalist (1907–2007)

- Born: Mary Louisa Butcher; January 30, 1907; Ardmore, Pennsylvania, U.S.
- Died: April 25, 2007 (aged 100); Hockessin, Delaware
- Education: Vassar College (BA)
- Occupation: Horticulturalist
- Spouse: Julian Hill (m. 1932; died 1996)
- Children: 3

Mary Louise Butcher "Polly" Hill (January 30, 1907 – April 25, 2007) was an American horticulturist best known for testing how well plants could survive in cold climates. She founded the Polly Hill Arboretum on Martha's Vineyard, Massachusetts.

== Early life and education ==
Hill was born as Mary Louisa Butcher on January 30, 1907 in Ardmore, Pennsylvania to parents Margaret Keen and Howard Butcher, Jr. When she was 19, her parents bought a 40-acre (16 ha) farm, then called Barnard's Inn Farm, that Hill would later transform into a 70-acre (28 ha) arboretum specializing in exotic flora. Hill graduated in 1928 from Vassar College with a degree in Music.

After graduation, Hill moved to Japan to teach English at a women's college and learned about traditional Japanese flower arranging there. After returning to the United States, she studied botany and horticulture at the University of Maryland in the 1940s. She later also studied at the University of Delaware.

== Career ==
Hill inherited what is now the Polly Hill Arboretum from her parents in 1957. At the age of fifty while undertaking this new endeavor, she was often quoted as saying, "fifty is a great age to try something new.” She had a special interest in gathering seeds from across the globe and studying how they would endure the cold climate of New England winters.

In 1998, she established the Poly Hill Arboretum with Dr. David H. Smith as a not-for-profit institution. Stephen Spongberg, a long-time associate of Hill, became its first Executive Director. The arboretum is known for its famous North Tisbury azaleas.

== Personal life and death ==
Hill married Julian Hill in 1932 and had three children. She died at Cokesbury Village in Hockessin, Delaware at age 100.
