= Marie Hicks =

American civil rights activist

Marie A. Hicks
- Born: December 20, 1923; Harlem, New York
- Died: April 19, 2007 (aged 83); Germantown, Pennsylvania
- Occupations: American civil rights activist and sociologist
- Known for: Pressuring Girard College to integrate

Marie A. Hicks (December 20, 1923 – April 19, 2007) was an African-American activist during the American civil rights movement.

Nicknamed "the Rosa Parks of Girard College," Hicks is best known for leading thousands of pickets around the wall of that academic institution during the mid-1960s. Her efforts led to her sons being enrolled in the formerly all-white school in 1968.

== Formative years ==
Born in Harlem, New York on December 20, 1923, Hicks married Junius Fletcher Hicks (1921–1964), who served with the United States Army during World War II. She moved with him during the early 1960s to a section of North Philadelphia; however, he fell ill and died from cancer-related complications in December 1964, leaving her to support her family on the death benefits she received from the U.S. Social Security Administration and the U.S. Veterans' Administration. Struggling financially, she attempted to improve the quality of life for her family by securing admission for her sons to Girard College, which operated as a private boarding school for boys; however, the school, which was located near where she and her family lived but was walled off from her community, was only open for admissions to white students who were fatherless. When she and her sons were turned away by admissions personnel, she subsequently sought advice from other parents and then an attorney, actions which set her on the path to becoming a prominent civil rights activist in Philadelphia, the Commonwealth of Pennsylvania and the United States.

== Civil rights work ==
As the mother of two boys who were unable to benefit from educational offerings at their neighborhood college due to its race-based admissions policies, Hicks became an advocate for her sons, Charles and Theodore, and then an activist for her entire community, state and nation during the American Civil Rights movement. Hicks led thousands of pickets at Girard College in Philadelphia to raise awareness of the institution's practice of denying students admission based on their race. Among those joining her in those protests were Martin Luther King Jr. and Cecil B. Moore.

In addition to protesting and organizing, Hicks also sued the college. As a result, the school was integrated. Two of the first four African-American students were her sons, Charles and Theodore Hicks. Theodore ultimately became the school's first black valedictorian. As the school's student body continued to diversify, the college finally admitted its first female student during the 1980s.

== Later years ==
During the 1970s, Marie Hicks obtained employment as a maid at La Salle University, and began attending night classes there. In 1980, she was awarded a bachelor's degree in sociology from that institution.

While writing for Philadelphia's Scoop newspaper, she interviewed and worked with homeless women. She remained active well into her later life, working with senior citizens as a volunteer for Center in the Park's Intergenerational Programs.

=== Illness, death and interment ===
Diagnosed with Parkinson's disease, Hicks died at the age of 83 from complications related to her condition on April 19, 2007, in Germantown, Pennsylvania. Her funeral was held at Faith Tabernacle Baptist Church on Montgomery Avenue in Philadelphia on April 25. Afterward, the funeral procession traveled "from the church to Girard College, where it [circled] the 10-foot wall, [entered] through the gates and [drove] to Founder's Hall and the statue of Stephen Girard before proceeding to Beverly National Cemetery in Burlington County" in Burlington, New Jersey, where she was buried next to her husband.
