= Ida R. Hoos =

American sociologist

Ida Simone Russakoff Hoos (October 9, 1912 – April 24, 2007) was an American sociologist best known as a critic of systems analysis using mathematical formulae and disregarding social factors, especially when analyzing technology and public policy.

== Biography ==
Born in Skowhegan, Maine, where her Jewish parents had settled as jeweler after emigrating from Russia. She graduated from Radcliffe College in 1933 and earned a master's degree from Harvard University in 1942. While in graduate school, she founded Jewish Vocational Service in Boston to help garment workers. After earning her master's, she moved to Berkeley, California, where her husband took a job teaching economics at University of California, Berkeley. She earned her Ph.D. there in 1959 with the dissertation Automation in the Office: A Social Survey of Occupational and Organizational Changes, published in book in 1961 as Automation in the Office.

Whilst a research sociologist at the University of California late 1960s she published a series of critiques of the systems approach to social policy She criticised systems analysis for using mathematical formulae and disregarding social factors, especially when analyzing technology and public policy. She reminisced about her work's impact: "Technological advance was evident on every front. The 'dominant paradigm' embraced only the quantitative. What you could not count, did not count. The social and human aspects were systematically avoided in the rush to be 'scientific.'"

She retired in 1982. Hoos died at Massachusetts General Hospital in Boston of pneumonia.

== Publications ==
Books, a selection:

- 1961. Automation in the Office. Public Affairs Press.
- 1967. Retraining the Work Force. University of California Press
- 1972. Systems Analysis in Public Policy: A Critique. Reprinted in 1976, 1983

Articles, papers, etc. a selection:

- 1967. A Critique on the Application of Systems Analysis to Social Problems Paper Space Sciences Laboratory, Social Sciences Project, University of California
- 1967. Systems Analysis in State Government. Paper Space Sciences Laboratory, Social Sciences Project, University of California
- 1967. Systems Analysis, Information Handling, and the Research Function: Implications of the California Experience. Paper Space Sciences Laboratory, Social Sciences Project, University of California
- 1968. A Critical Review of Systems Analysis: The California Experience. Paper Space Sciences Laboratory, Social Sciences Project, University of California
- 1968. Systems analysis and the technical writer's growing responsibility. Paper Space Sciences Laboratory, Social Sciences Project
- 1969. Systems analysis in social policy: a critical review. Paper Institute of Economic Affairs
