= Polly Hill Arboretum =

Arboretum in Martha's Vineyard, Massachusetts, United States

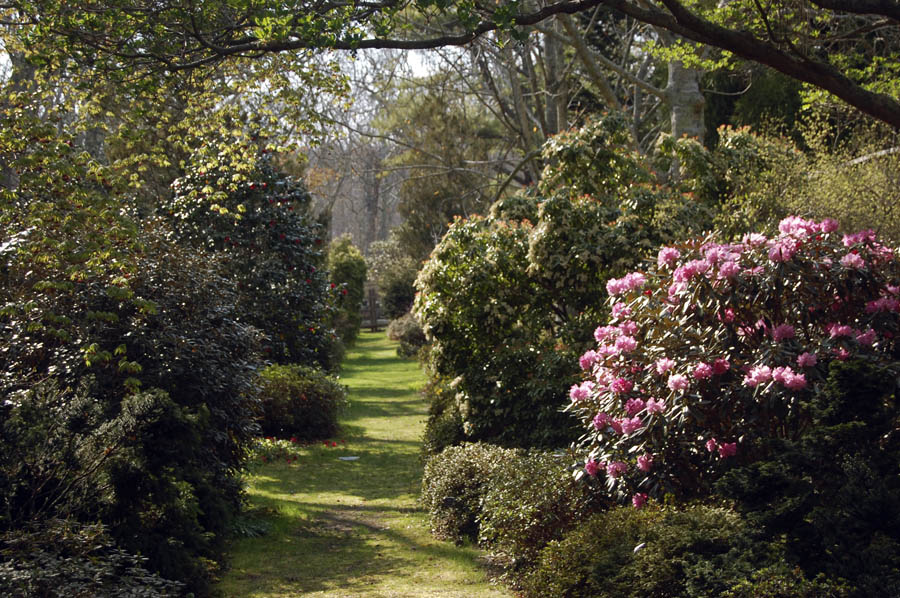
- Polly's playpen, a fenced-in garden containing some of the arboretum's most beautiful plants

- Location within Massachusetts
- Location: West Tisbury, Massachusetts, United States
- Coordinates: 41.397481°N 70.680542°W
- Area: 60 acres (24 ha)
- Elevation: 21 metres (69 ft)
- Established: 1998
- Founder: Polly Hill
- Open: Daily, sunrise to sunset.
- Status: Public
- Plants: 3,061
- Species: 935
- Collections: Stewartia, Magnolia
- Website: www.pollyhillarboretum.org

The Polly Hill Arboretum includes 8 ha (20 acres) under cultivation, with an additional 16 ha (40 acres) of native woodland, located on Martha's Vineyard at 795 State Road, West Tisbury, Massachusetts, United States. It has been developed since 1958 by the horticulturist Polly Hill, and was listed on the National Register of Historic Places in 2015.

In 1687, Henry Luce, one of the first English settlers on Martha's Vineyard purchased 400 acres (1.6 km^{2}) of land in the island's center from the natives. In 1926, 16 ha (40 acres) of this land, then a sheep farm, were acquired by Hill's family. After her father's death, Hill decided to create an arboretum in 1958, growing the trees from seed. Through purchase of adjacent land, the property was increased to a total of 24 ha (60 acres). The Arboretum's administrative offices are housed in a building dating from the 1670s. Other historic structures on the property include the Far Barn (circa 1750) with its attached Slaughterhouse, the Cow Barn (a private residence), and the adjacent "Gym".

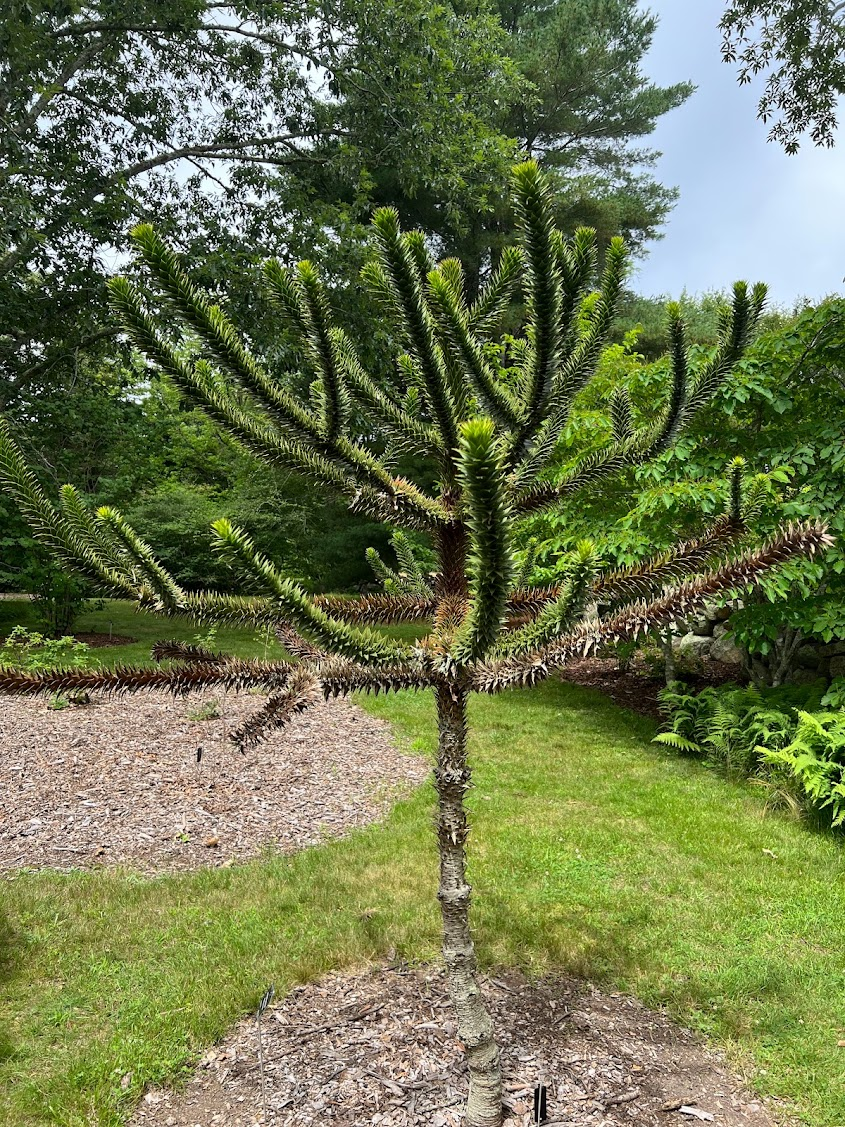
A small Araucaria araucana at Polly Hill Arboretum

The Arboretum now contains North Tisbury azaleas, witch-hazels, winter hazels, camellias, magnolias, stuartias, conifers, and deciduous and evergreen hollies, and incorporates a dogwood avenue and a pleached hornbeam arbor. Polly Hill plant introductions include varieties of Cornus kousa, Ilex, Stewartia, and about forty Rhododendrons. Polly Hill also contains several Araucaria araucana, commonly called monkey puzzle trees, which are endangered in their native Argentina and Chile.

== See also ==
- List of botanical gardens in the United States
- North American Plant Collections Consortium
- National Register of Historic Places listings in Dukes County, Massachusetts
