= Capil Rampersad =

Trinidadian cricketer (1960–2007)

Capil Rabin Rampersad (12 September 1960 – 13 April 2007 in Port of Spain) was a Trinidadian cricketer who played for Trinidad and Tobago in the 1980s.
