= Worth McDougald =

American journalist

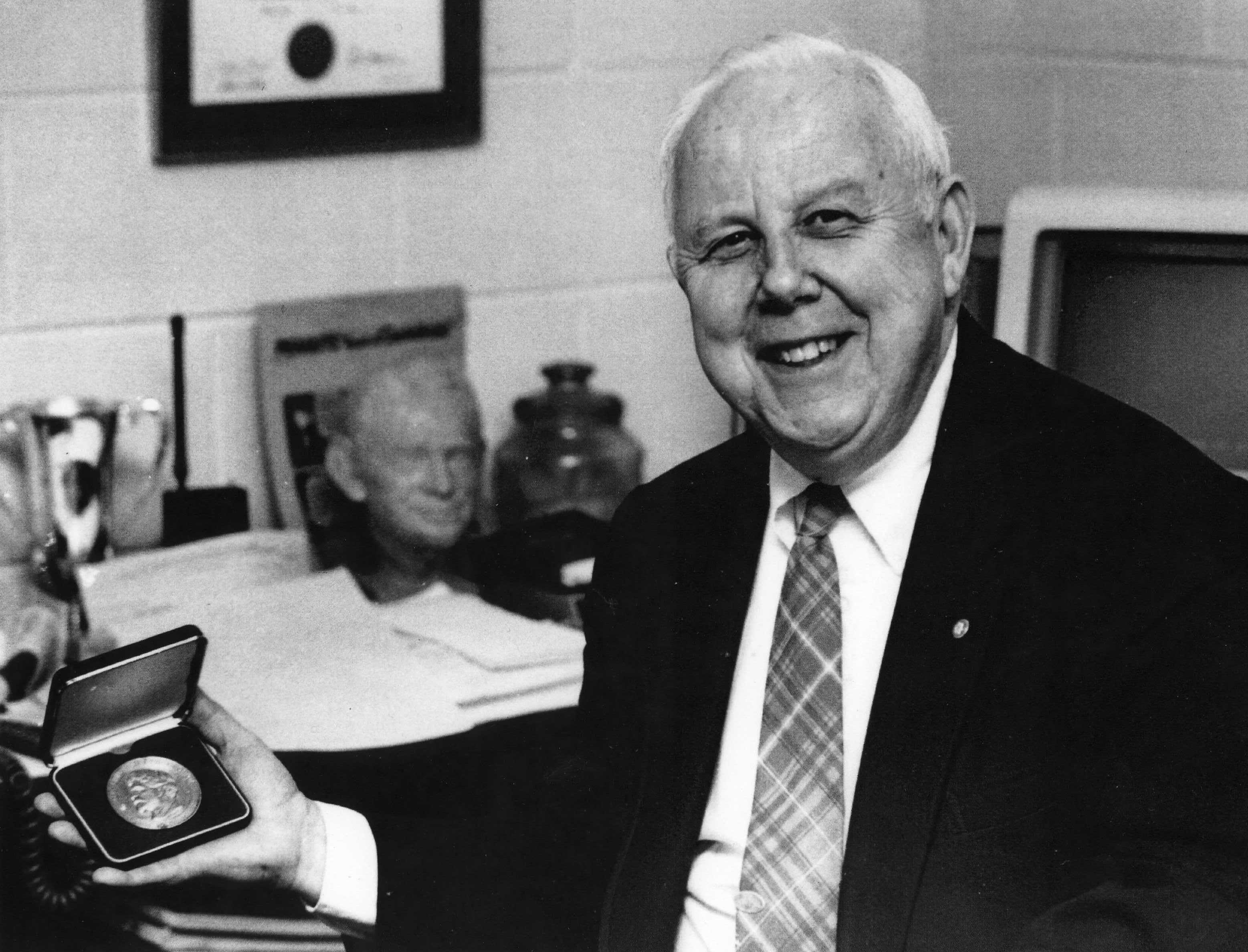
Worth McDougald, second Peabody Awards director, in his office at Grady College, University of Georgia.

Worth McDougald (July 26, 1925 – April 19, 2007) was an American journalism educator who oversaw the Peabody Awards for nearly 30 years, from 1963 to 1991.

McDougald grew up in Statesboro, Georgia. In World War II, McDougald served in the United States Navy in the Pacific Theater, then returned to Emory University to complete his degree. He became an assistant professor at the University of Georgia (UGA) in 1949, then earned an M.A. degree in political science from UGA in 1954, and the PhD degree from the Ohio State University in 1964. He was again called to active duty during the Korean War. "Dr. Mac", as he was known on campus at UGA, served in a variety of roles, including head of the Department of Radio-Television-Film. McDougald was named to the Georgia Broadcasting Hall of Fame.
