= Johnson Space Center shooting =

2007 hostage situation and shooting in Houston, Texas

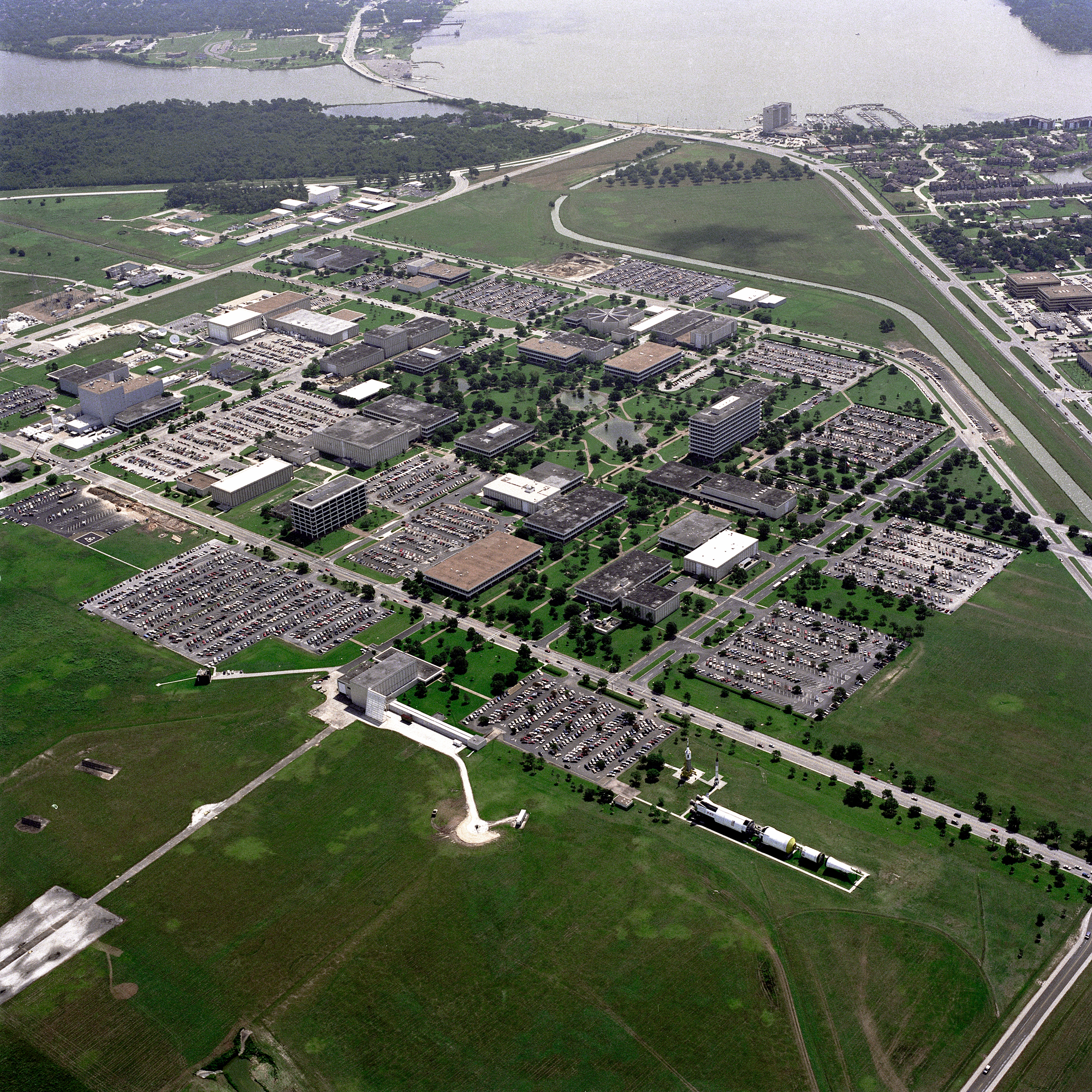
- The Johnson Space Center complex, where the incident took place
- Location: 29°33′40″N 95°05′32″W; Clear Lake City, Houston, Texas, United States
- Date: April 20, 2007; 1:00 p.m. – 5:00 p.m. (UTC-5)
- Target: Lyndon B. Johnson Space Center
- Attack type: Hostage taking, murder
- Weapon: 5-shot snub-nosed .38-caliber Smith & Wesson revolver
- Deaths: 2 (including the perpetrator)
- Injuries: 0
- Perpetrator: William A. Phillips

The Johnson Space Center shooting was an incident of hostage taking that occurred on April 20, 2007, in Building 44, the Communication and Tracking Development Laboratory, at the Lyndon B. Johnson Space Center (JSC) in Houston, Texas, United States. The gunman, William Phillips, an employee for Jacobs Engineering who worked at Building 44, shot and killed one person and took a hostage for over three hours before committing suicide. Police said Phillips was under review for poor job performance and he feared being dismissed.

== Timeline of events ==
The situation began at 1:00 p.m. (UTC-5) when gunman William Phillips entered a conference room, pointed a .38 or .357-caliber snub-nosed revolver at one person, and ordered everyone else to leave. He immediately confronted David Beverly about his job review, saying "You're the one who's going to get me fired." The two talked for several minutes. Then, at approximately 1:40 p.m., three gunshots were heard. Police said Beverly was initially shot twice, but he was still alive. Phillips left and then returned seconds later to shoot Beverly twice more.

Phillips then took Fran Crenshaw, who happened to be in the area, hostage and bound her to a chair with duct tape. Phillips barricaded himself and Crenshaw inside the second floor of Building 44 for the next three hours. During this, Crenshaw attempted to calm Phillips, with whom she was reported to have had a positive relationship. Later, Crenshaw was able to get herself out of the tape and alert authorities about what was happening. Meanwhile, SWAT teams surrounded the building. Building 44 as well as four other nearby buildings were evacuated and NASA employees in other buildings were ordered to remain inside their buildings, but were later told they were free to go at the end of the workday. A nearby school, Space Center Intermediate School, was temporarily placed on lockdown.

The incident ended at 5:00 p.m. as the SWAT teams attempted to communicate with Phillips when the gunman committed suicide with a single shot to the head. Crenshaw was taken to St. John Hospital by ambulance and then released for questioning by the Houston Police Department. She was physically unharmed and walked out of the hospital on her own.

=== Victims ===
A person identified as David Beverly was shot four times to the chest and killed. He was a 62-year-old electrical parts specialist employed by NASA. Fran Crenshaw, a contract worker with MRI Technologies, was held hostage by Phillips. During the incident she attempted to calm Phillips, and eventually escaped her bonds.

== Perpetrator ==
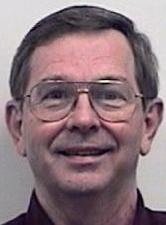
Photo of gunman William Phillips

The gunman was identified as 60-year-old William A. Phillips, who was known to be unmarried and lived by himself. He was an employee of Jacobs Engineering, and had worked as a NASA contractor for 12 to 13 years. Michael Coats, director of the JSC, said Phillips was "until recently, a good employee." Phillips knew the two victims, David Beverly and Fran Crenshaw. Police said there was "some kind of dispute" between Beverly and Phillips, possibly related to a pending review of job performance.
