= Rudolf Marszałek =

Polish priest (1911– 1948)

Rudolf Marszałek SChr
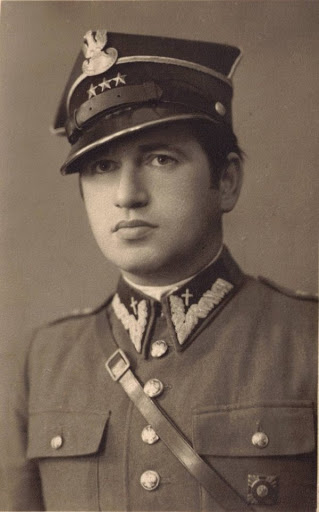
- Born: August 29, 1911; Komorowice, Bielsko-Biała
- Died: March 10, 1948 (aged 36); Warsaw
- Burial place: Unknown
- Military career
- Allegiance: National Armed Forces; Home Army
- Rank: Captain; Chaplain
- Nickname: "Opoka"
- Unit: Poznań Army
- Conflicts: Siege of Warsaw (1939)

Rudolf Marszałek SChr (August 29, 1911 – March 10, 1948) was a Polish priest of the Roman Catholic Church and a member of the Society of Christ. He served a chaplain during World War II, serving in the Home Army and National Armed Forces. As a member of the military arm of the Polish Underground State, he was arrested in December 1946 by the Ministry of Public Security. After spending a year in Mokotów Prison, he was sentenced to death on January 17, 1948, and executed on March 10, 1948.
