= Henryk Handy =

Polish ice hockey player

- Born: 9 July 1940; Mysłowice, General Government
- Died: 13 April 2007 (aged 66); Katowice, Poland
- Height: 5 ft 5 in (165 cm)
- Weight: 137 lb (62 kg; 9 st 11 lb)
- Position: Defence
- Played for: Górnik Murcki; Legia Warsaw
- National team: Poland
- Playing career: 1955–1965

Henryk Handy (9 July 1940 – 13 April 2007) was a Polish ice hockey player. He played for Górnik Murcki and Legia Warsaw during his career. He also played for the Polish national team at the 1964 Winter Olympics. He won the Polish hockey league championship two times in his career.
