= Alan Barth =

American journalist and author (1906–1979)

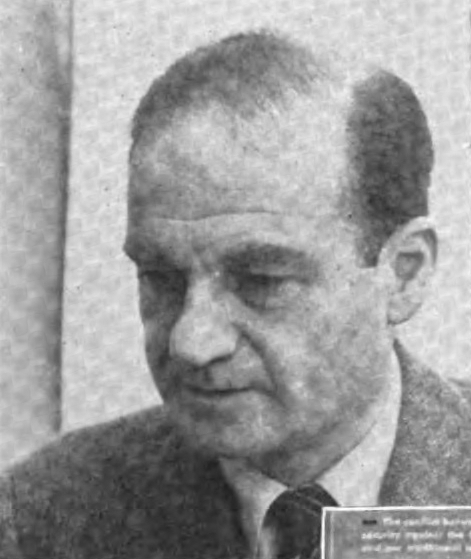
- Barth c. 1954
- Born: Alan Barth Lachheimer; October 21, 1906; New York City, U.S.
- Died: November 20, 1979 (aged 73); Washington, D.C., U.S.
- Education: Yale University (PhB)
- Occupations: Journalist, author
- Spouse: Adrienne Mayer (m. 1939)
- Children: 2

Alan Barth (October 21, 1906 – November 20, 1979) was a 20th-century American journalist and author, specializing in civil liberties, best known for his 30-year stint as an editorial writer at The Washington Post as well as his books, particularly The Loyalty of Free Men (1951).

== Background ==
He was born Alan Barth Lachheimer on October 21, 1906, in New York City to Jacob and Flora (Barth) Lauchheimer. He received his Ph.B. from Yale University in 1929 and was a Nieman fellow at Harvard University 1948–49.

== Career ==
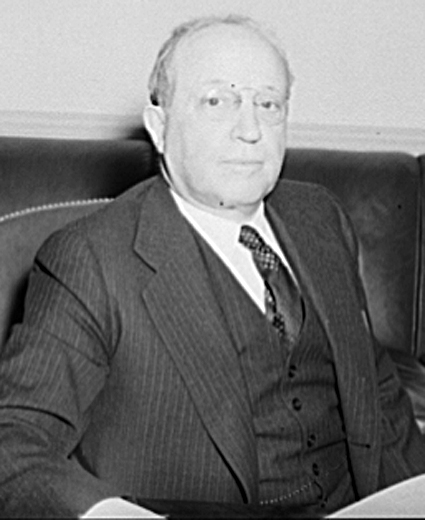
Eugene Meyer hired Barth to The Washington Post

In 1936, Barth worked on the Beaumont Enterprise in Beaumont, Texas, where he had grown up. In 1938, he went to Washington, DC, as a reporter for the McClure Newspaper Syndicate. In 1941 during World War II, he worked first in the Treasury and then the Office of War Information.

In 1943, Supreme Court Justice Felix Frankfurter, a fellow New Dealer, recommended Barth to Eugene Meyer, publisher of The Washington Post publisher at that time. Meyer hired him as an editorial writer for a paper.

In 1945, Barth denounced a threat by white drivers of buses in Washington, DC, who threatened to strike if the city started to hire black drivers: "To bar men from serving in these jobs because of their race or color is at once to hamper the war program and to subvert the principles for which the war is being waged."

In the 1950s, Barth challenged the investigations of U.S. Senator Joseph McCarthy. In 1950, he defended the performance Earl Browder (former head of the Communist Party of the USA, by McCarthy's Congressional investigating committee for "refusing to identify and stigmatize certain persons whose names were presented to him." By that time, the Post had come under fire as being "pro-Communist."

Barth also contributed to The New York Times Magazine and Book Review.

He retired in 1972.

== Personal and death ==
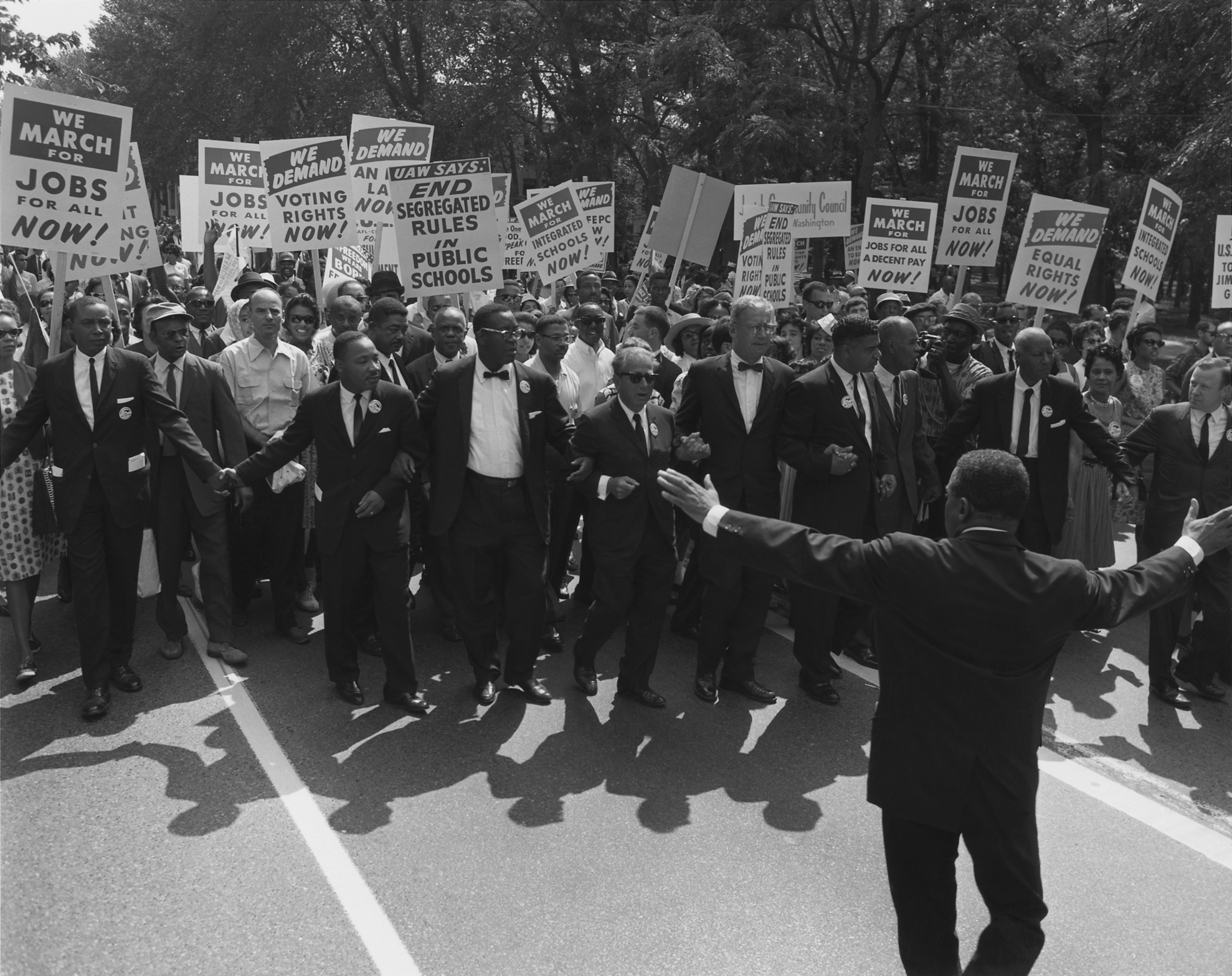
March on Washington (August 28, 1963), showing Joseph L. Rauh Jr. (center)–Barth's close friend– with Martin Luther King Jr. (left), Whitney Young, Roy Wilkins, A. Philip Randolph, Walter Reuther, and Sam Weinblatt.

Barth married Adrienne Mayer on July 1, 1939. They had two children.

He was an advocate for civil rights and for gun control.

Joseph Rauh of the American Civil Liberties Union was a close personal friend.

He died age 73 of cancer on November 20, 1979, in the Veterans Administration Hospital in Washington, DC.

== Legacy ==
Barth helped change the identity of the Washington Post from conservative to liberal and to an institution dedicated to civil liberties. David Halberstam described Barth as "more passionate than most intelligent men and more intelligent and reasoned than most passionate men."

He is the earliest known source of the phrase "News is only the first rough draft of history," writing it in 1943 – see Wikiquote article for details.

== Works ==
His best-known book is probably the posthumously published The Rights of Free Men: An Essential Guide to Civil Liberties, a collection of his articles, editorials, speeches, and other material. In 1951, he was awarded the Hillman Prize for his book, The Loyalty of Free Men. He was elected a Fellow of the American Academy of Arts and Sciences in 1952. The U.S. Government had it removed from its public bookshelves.

=== Books ===
- The Rights of Free Men: An Essential Guide to Civil Liberties (1984)
- Prophets with Honor: Great Dissents and Great Dissenters in the Supreme Court (1974)
- Presidential Impeachment (1974)
- Government by investigation (1973)
- The Heritage of Liberty (1965)
- Law Enforcement versus the Law (1963)
- The Price of Liberty (1961)
- When Congress investigates (1955)
- The Loyalty of Free Men (1951) with foreword by Zechariah Chafee

=== Articles ===
- "F.D.R. as a politician" in Harper's (February 1945)
- "How good is an FBI report?" in Harper's (March 1954)
- "Why handle criminals with kid gloves?" in Harper's (September 1959)
