= Norman Butler (cricketer) =

English cricketer

Norman Butler (6 May 1930 – 1 April 2007) was an English cricketer. He was a left-handed batsman who played for Buckinghamshire. He was born in Chippenham and died in Slough.

Butler, the opening order, scored 5 runs in his only List A appearance.
