= Bernard Marszałek =

Polish powerboat racer

Bernard Waldemar Marszałek (1975 – 30 April 2007) was a powerboat driver from Poland who was the son of six-time world champion Waldemar Marszałek. Bernard won the O-350 World Championship in 2003. He was a candidate for the Polish Deputy Minister of Sport but died of an asthma attack in 2007, age 31.
