= Timeline of the Virginia Tech shooting =

Timeline of the 2007 mass shooting

This timeline of events from the Virginia Tech shooting lists times in Eastern Daylight Time (UTC-4).

The official timeline was compiled by TriData Corp, a division of defense contractor System Planning Corp., for use by the eight-member panel appointed by Virginia Governor Tim Kaine.

== Background ==
=== 2003 ===
- Seung-Hui Cho graduated from Westfield High School in Chantilly, Fairfax County, Virginia.

=== 2004 ===
Monday, January 19

- Cho started trading on eBay with ID "blazers5505".

=== 2005 ===
Fall

- Andy Koch, Cho's suitemate, took Cho out to some parties at the start of the fall semester in 2005. At one party, Cho got "tipsy" enough that he opened up and began talking about his virtual love life. He said he had an imaginary girlfriend named Jelly, and that she was "a supermodel that lived in space." Jelly had a nickname for Cho—Spanky.
- Andy Koch along with John Eide snooped in Cho's belongings and "found nothing more threatening than a pocket knife."

Fall poetry class

- Professor Nikki Giovanni requested that Cho either change the sinister content of his poems or drop the class. Cho responded, "You can't make me."

Removed from poetry class

- Lucinda Roy, co-director of the creative writing program removed Cho from Professor Giovanni's class and tutored him one-on-one. When Cho refused to go to counseling, Roy notified the Division of Student Affairs, the Cook Counseling Center, the Schiffert Health Center, the Virginia Tech police and the College of Liberal Arts and Human Sciences.

Fall writing class

- Professor Lisa Norris, who had Cho in her class, alerted the associate dean of students, Mary Ann Lewis, who could find "no mention of mental health issues or police reports" on Cho.

Sunday, November 27

- A female student filed a report with the Virginia Tech campus police indicating that Cho had made "annoying" contact with her on the internet, by phone and in person. The investigating officer referred Cho to the school's disciplinary system, the office of judicial affairs, which is separate from the police department.

Monday, December 12

- Another female student, a friend of Andy Koch, filed a report with the Virginia Tech campus police complaining of "disturbing" instant messages from Cho. She requested that Cho "have no further contact with her."

Tuesday, December 13

- Virginia Tech campus police notified Cho that he was to have no further contact with the female student.
- After Virginia Tech campus police left, Andy Koch, Cho's roommate, received an instant message from Cho stating, "I might as well kill myself now."
- In response to receiving the instant message from Cho, Andy Koch, Cho's roommate, notified the resident advisor and phoned his father. Koch and his father alerted Virginia Tech campus police that Cho had sent Koch a suicidal instant message.
- Virginia Tech campus police took Cho off campus to a voluntary counseling evaluation at New River Community Services, where he was examined by Kathy Goodbey. Goodbey determined that he was "mentally ill and in need of hospitalization."
- Cho's paperwork, declaring Cho "an imminent danger to self or others", was sent to court.
- Cho was transported to Carilion St. Albans Psychiatric Hospital where psychologist Roy Crouse determined that Cho "is mentally ill; that he does not present an imminent danger to (himself/others), or is not substantially unable to care for himself, as a result of mental illness; and that he does not require involuntary hospitalization."

Wednesday, December 14

- Cho was released from Carilion St. Albans Psychiatric Hospital after his examination by Roy Crouse.
- Cho's paperwork was sent to special Justice Paul M. Barnett, who certified the finding and ordered follow-up treatment.
- Neither the court, the university nor community services officials followed up on the judge's order, according to dozens of interviews. Cho never got the treatment, according to authorities who have seen his medical files.

=== 2006 ===
Fall

- Cho enrolled in Professor Brent Stevens's English 3984 class, "Special Studies: Contemporary Horror. - 'not for the faint of heart' ." In that class, he analyzed The Texas Chain Saw Massacre and explored in papers and a "fear journal" how "horror has become a masochistic pleasure." Cho later sold his textbooks on eBay-affiliated site half.com. The textbooks that were sold included Men, Women, and Chainsaws by Carol J. Clover, a book that explores gender in the modern horror film. Others include The Best of H. P. Lovecraft: Bloodcurdling Tales of Horror and the Macabre; and The Female of the Species: Tales of Mystery and Suspense by Joyce Carol Oates, a book in which the publisher writes: "In these and other gripping and disturbing tales, women are confronted by the evil around them and surprised by the evil they find within themselves."

=== 2007 ===
Friday, February 2

- Cho ordered a handgun online. He purchased the .22 caliber Walther P22 on the Internet from TGSCOM, Inc.

Friday, February 9

- Cho picked up the .22 caliber Walther P22 from J-N-D Pawnbrokers pawnshop in Blacksburg, Virginia, across the street from the school.

March

- Cho stayed in a Roanoke motel and hired a dancer, Chastity Frye, for a one-hour performance.

Monday, March 12

- Cho rented a burgundy Kia Sedona van from Enterprise Rent-A-Car at the Roanoke Regional Airport that he kept for almost a month. Cho videotaped some of his diatribe in the van.

Tuesday, March 13

- Cho purchased a 9 millimeter Glock 19 handgun and a $10 box of 50 9-mm full metal jacket ammunition.

Thursday, March 22

- Cho showed up at the PSS Range, an indoor pistol range in Roanoke, and spent an hour practicing, buying four ammunition magazines for the Glock 19. Range employees, investigators later said, remembered a young Asian man videotaping himself inside a van in the parking lot.
- Using the handle "blazers5505" on eBay, Cho purchased two 10-round magazines for the Walther P22 from "Bullelk14".

Friday, March 23

- Cho purchased three additional 10-round magazines from "oneclickshooting", another eBay seller located in Fremont, Nebraska.

Late March, (exact date uncertain)

- Cho rented a room in another local hotel and was visited by a dancer from an escort service.

Saturday, March 31 (April 7, 8 and 13)

- Cho purchased additional ammunition and a hunting knife from Wal-Mart.

Unknown date

- Cho purchased additional ammunition magazines from Dick's Sporting Goods and chains from a Home Depot.

Early April (date unknown)

- Cho returns the rented minivan to its owner.

Sunday, April 8

- Cho spent the night at the Hampton Inn in Christiansburg, Virginia, videotaping segments for his manifesto-like diatribe.

Friday, April 13

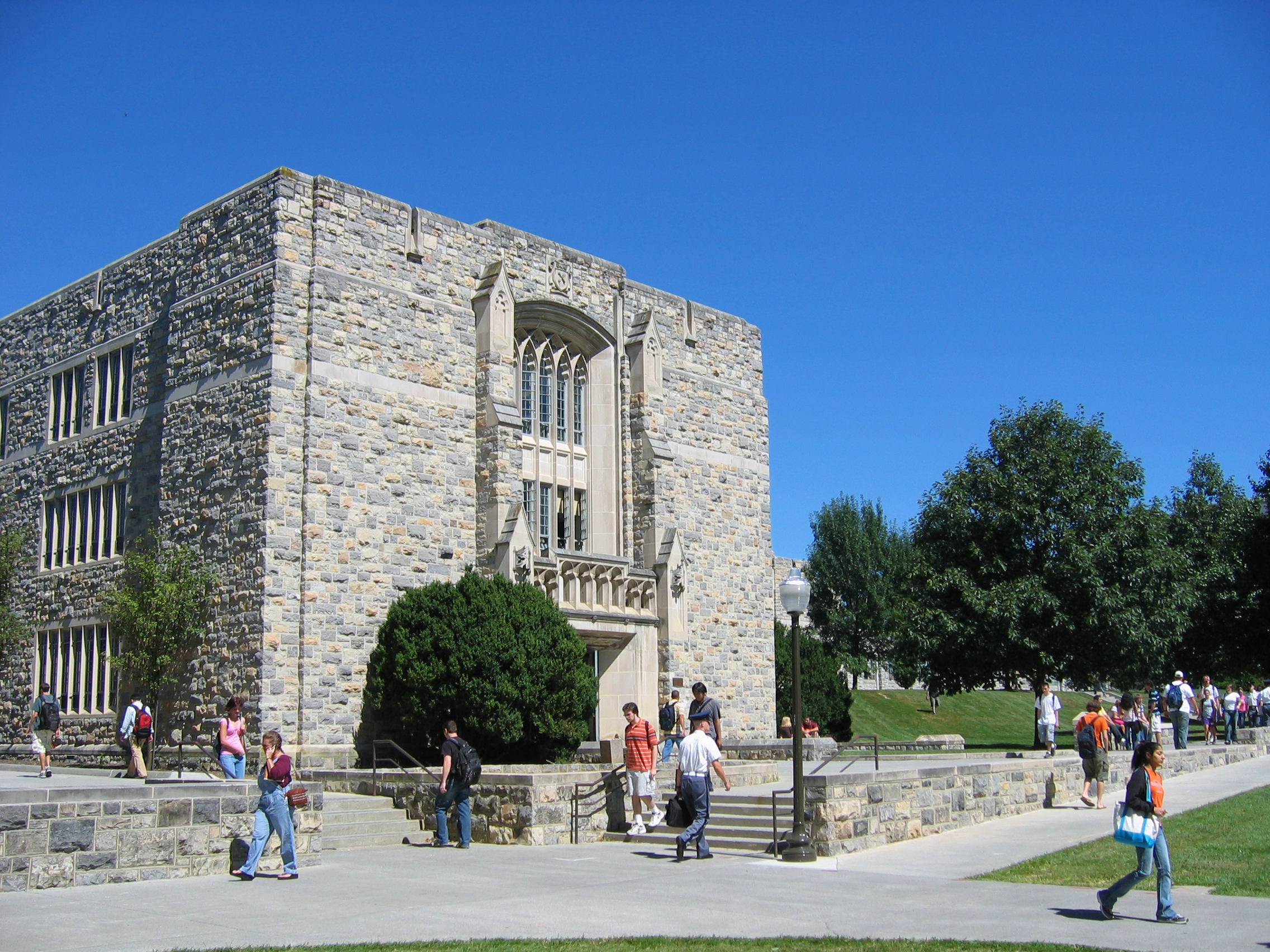
Norris Hall, where 30 of the 32 victims had died

- Bomb threats to Torgersen, Durham, and Whittemore Halls were called in anonymously. An additional bomb threat, this time to engineering school buildings, was found at the shooting scene at Norris Hall. A written bomb threat similar to the ones that were phoned in was found in Suite 2121 of Harper Hall, Cho's dormitory room.

Saturday, April 14

- Witnesses saw a "suspicious looking man with a hooded sweatshirt" near the entrance to Norris Hall, and some of the doors chained shut around the same time.

Sunday, April 15

- Cho phoned his family in Fairfax County.

== Day of the shooting ==
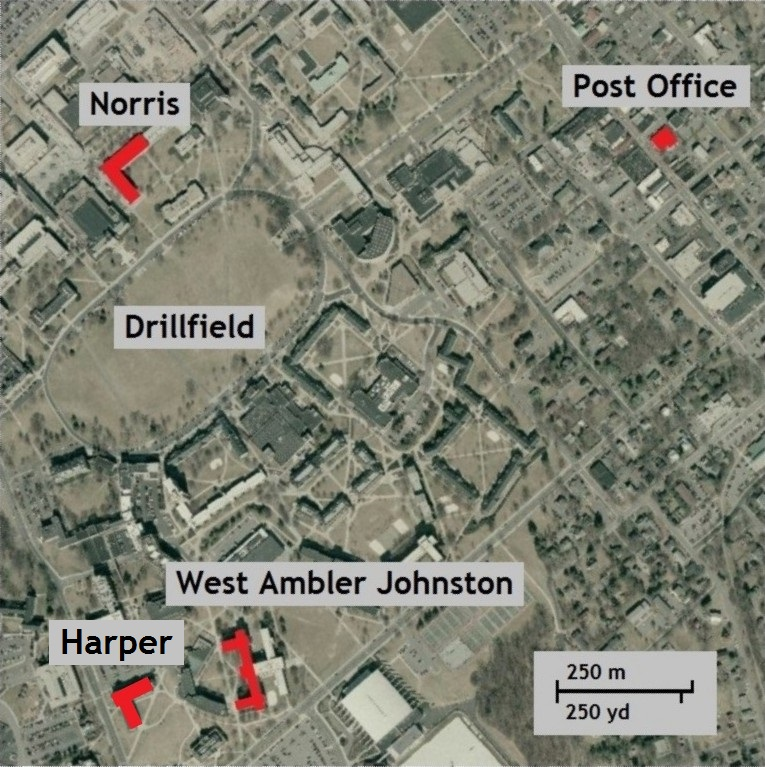
Aerial photo showing location of Harper Hall (Cho's dorm), Norris Hall, West Ambler Johnston Hall, and the Blacksburg, VA, U.S. Post Office

Monday, April 16

- 5:00 a.m.: While in Suite 2120 (room 2121) of Harper Hall, Joseph E. "Joe" Aust, one of Cho's five roommates, noticed that Cho was awake and at his computer.
- Around 5:30 a.m.: Karan Grewal, one of Cho's other roommates, noticed Cho, clad in boxer shorts and a T-shirt, brushing his teeth and applying acne cream after Grewal finished an "all-nighter" of study in Room 2121. Grewal did not see Cho after this point.
- Between 5:30 and 6:00 a.m.: Aust saw Cho return from the bathroom, get dressed, and leave.
- Before 7:00 a.m.: Cho was seen waiting outside an entrance to West Ambler Johnston Hall.
- Before 7:15 a.m.: Emily Hilscher was dropped off at her dormitory by her boyfriend, Karl D. Thornhill.
- 7:15 a.m.: A 9-1-1 emergency call to Virginia Tech campus police reported a shooting at West Ambler Johnston Hall, leaving Ryan Christopher Clark, the resident advisor, dead and Emily Hilscher fatally wounded in Suite 4040, which housed Hilscher.
- Between 7:15 am and 9:01 a.m.: Cho returned to his dormitory room to reload and left a "disturbing note."
- 7:30 a.m.: Investigators from VT PD and Blacksburg PD arrived.
- Between 7:30 am and 8:00 a.m.: Heather Haugh, Emily Hilscher's friend and roommate, arrived to meet her to go to chemistry class together. When she asked about Hilscher, Haugh was questioned by detectives and gave them the information that Hilscher would usually spend weekends with her boyfriend, Karl Thornhill, at his off-campus townhouse. She explained that on Monday mornings Thornhill would drop off Hilscher and go back to Radford University where he was a student, and that Thornhill was an avid gun user. This led the police to seek him out as a "person of interest."
- 8:00 a.m.: Classes at Virginia Tech began.
- Around 8:00 a.m.: West Ambler Johnston was locked down; a third floor resident assistant notified students of the lockdown. Aimee Kanode, a freshman, stated that police lifted the lockdown shortly before the Norris Hall attacks.
- 8:25 a.m.: Virginia Tech leadership team met to develop a plan on how to notify students of the homicide. Meanwhile, police stopped Karl Thornhill, in a vehicle off-campus and detained him for questioning.
- 8:52 a.m.: University President Charles Steger's office is locked down.
- 9:00 a.m.: Virginia Tech leadership team was briefed on the latest events in the ongoing dormitory homicide investigation.
- 9:01 am: Cho mailed a U.S. Postal Service express parcel from Blacksburg P.O. to NBC headquarters in New York City, containing pictures of him holding weapons, a 1,800-word diatribe and a video clip alluding to the coming massacre.
- 9:05 am: Jocelyne Couture-Nowak's Intermediate French Class in Norris 211 began.
- Around 9:05 a.m. to 9:15 a.m.: Cho was seen in Norris Hall, an Engineering building. Using chains (possibly the ones he had purchased at Home Depot), Cho chained the building's entry doors shut from the inside.
- 9:26 a.m.: E-mails were sent to campus staff, faculty, and students informing them of a "shooting incident" at the West AJ dormitory.
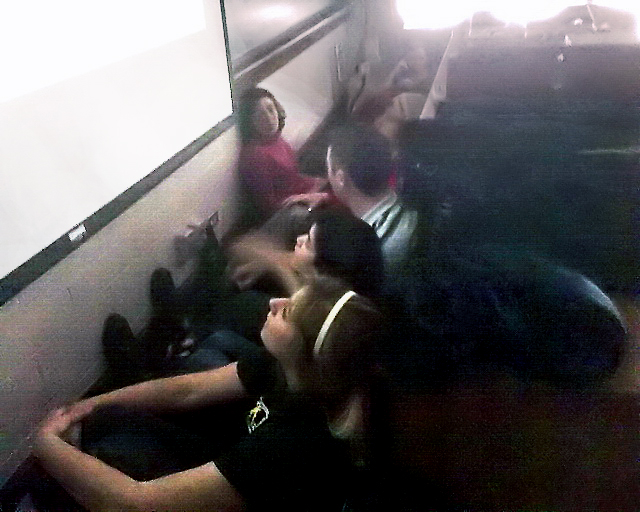
  Elementary French class students take cover in Holden Hall Room 212
- Around 9:30 am: A female student (Rachel Hill, who is shot to death in the classroom) walked into Norris 211 and alerted the occupants that a shooting occurred at West Ambler Johnston, where she lived at.
- 9:42 a.m.: Students in the engineering building, Norris Hall, made a 9-1-1 emergency call to alert police that more shots had been fired.
- 9:45 a.m.: Police arrived three minutes later and found that Cho had chained all three entrances shut.
- Between 9:40 and 9:51 am: Using the .22 caliber Walther P22 and 9 millimeter Glock 19 handgun with 17 magazines of ammunition, Cho shot 47 people, killing 30 of them. Cho's rampage lasted for approximately nine minutes. A student in Room 205 noticed the time remaining in class shortly before the start of the shootings.
- Around 9:40 a.m.: Students in Norris 205, while attending Haiyan Cheng's issues in scientific computing class, heard Cho's gunshots. The students, including Zach Petkewicz, barricaded the door and prevented Cho's entry.
- 9:50 a.m.: After arriving at Norris Hall, police took 5 minutes to assemble the proper team, clear the area and then break through the doors. They used a shotgun to break through the chained entry doors. Investigators believe that the shotgun blast alerted the gunman to the arrival of the police. The police heard gunshots as they entered the building. They followed the sounds to the second floor.
- 9:50 a.m.: A second e-mail announcing: "A gunman is loose on campus. Stay in buildings until further notice. Stay away from all windows" was sent to all Virginia Tech email addresses. Loudspeakers broadcast a similar message.
- 9:51 a.m.: As the police reached the second floor, the gunshots stopped. Cho's shooting spree in Norris Hall lasted 9 minutes. Police officers discovered that after his second round of shooting the occupants of Norris 211, the gunman fatally shot himself in the temple.
- 10:08 a.m: A deceased male student is discovered by police team and suspected to be the gunman. No identification is found on the body. He appears to have a self-inflicted gunshot wound to the head. He is found among his victims in classroom 211, the French class. Two weapons are found near the body.
- 10:17 a.m: A third e-mail was sent to notify about the cancellation of classes and advise people to stay where they are.
- 10:52 a.m.: A fourth e-mail was sent to warn of "a multiple shooting with multiple victims in Norris Hall", saying the shooter has been arrested and that police are hunting for a possible second shooter. The entrances to the campus buildings were locked.
- 12:00 p.m.: At a press conference, authorities said there may have been more than 21 people killed and twenty-eight injured.
- 12:42 p.m.: University President Charles Steger announced that police were releasing people from buildings and that counseling centers were being set up.
- 1:06 p.m.: The death toll had risen to 22.
- 1:43 p.m.: News stations confirmed that there were two separate shootings in a two-hour period.
- 4:30 p.m.: A university statement confirmed that there had been at least 31 deaths at Norris Hall, including the shooter.
- 5:31 p.m.: News stations reported that Cho shot himself in the face.
- 7:30 p.m.: A news conference confirmed the number of weapons used, and a possible identification of the suspect that would not be released at that time.
- 8:22 p.m.: News stations confirmed that Cho wore a bullet-proof vest.
- 9:06 p.m.: Police knocked on the door of Suite 2121, alerting Grewal and informing him that Cho killed the people in Norris and West Ambler Johnston halls.

== Aftermath ==
Tuesday, April 17

- 9:15 a.m.: Virginia Tech Police Department released name of shooter as Cho Seung-Hui and confirmed the death toll of 33.
- 9:30 a.m.: Virginia Tech announced that classes would be cancelled "for the remainder of the week to allow students the time they need to grieve and seek assistance as needed."
- 2:00 p.m.: A convocation ceremony was held at the university community at Cassell Coliseum. President George W. Bush, First Lady Laura Bush, and Virginia Governor Tim Kaine were among the many people in attendance.

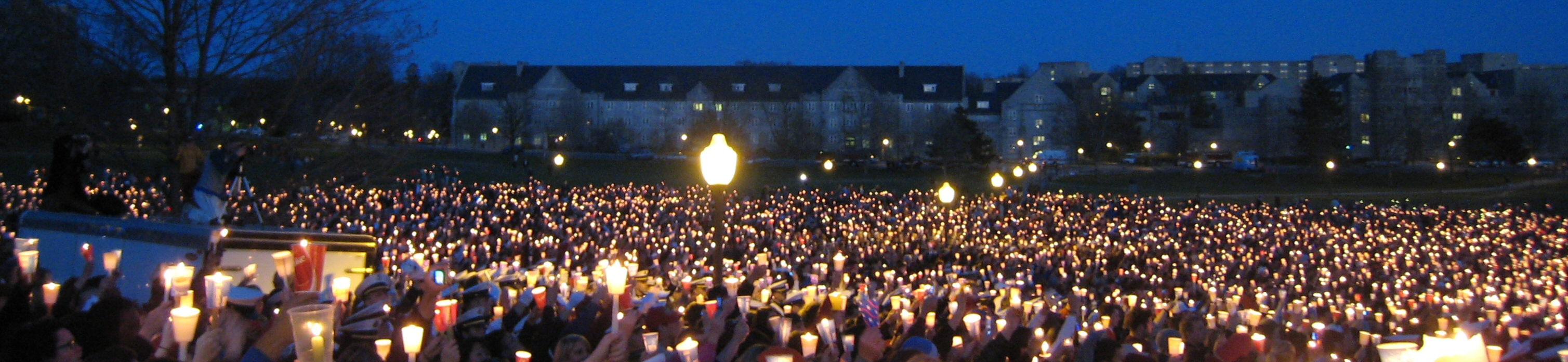
Virginia Tech students mourn the victims at a candlelight vigil.

- 8:00 p.m.: A candlelight vigil was held on the University Drillfield.

Wednesday, April 18

- 8:25 a.m.: A SWAT team entered Burruss Hall, a campus building next to Norris Hall. No explanation was immediately available. Virginia Tech's public affairs office stated that police were responding to "suspicious activity".
- 4:37 p.m.: Local police authorities announced that television network NBC received correspondence from Cho, some of which included images of him holding weapons, writings, audio recordings and videos; this information was immediately submitted to the FBI. Since the package was timestamped between the first incident at West Ambler Johnson and the second shooting at Norris Hall, it is possible some of the material was drafted by Cho during the 2 hour interval.

Thursday, April 19

- 9:49 a.m.: Virginia Tech announced that all students killed on Monday will be granted posthumous degrees in the field in which they were studying. These degrees would be given to the families at the regular commencement exercises that they would have participated in with their friends.

Friday, April 20

- All day: VA Governor Kaine declared a statewide day of mourning. Alumni encouraged display of the Virginia Tech school colors: orange and maroon.
- Cho's family issues statement of apology.

Monday, April 23

- William Massello, an assistant state medical examiner, said autopsies of Cho's 32 victims revealed that he fired "more than 100" bullets into them. "Some were hit once; some were hit several times, more than once. We had two, three, four, maybe even as high as six." The initial autopsy of the Virginia Tech gunman found no gross brain function abnormalities that could explain the rampage that left 33 people dead.

June 12, 2007

- Cho's family allows the release of Cho's records to the Virginia Tech Incident Review Panel.

August 30, 2007

- The Virginia Tech Incident Review Panel completes its report, which is now publicly available.
