= Seung-Hui Cho =

South Korean mass murderer (1984–2007)

- Born: Cho Seung-hui; January 18, 1984; Asan, South Chungcheong, South Korea
- Died: April 16, 2007 (aged 23); Blacksburg, Virginia, U.S.
- Cause of death: Suicide by gunshot
- Education: Virginia Tech

Details
- Date: April 16, 2007; 19 years ago 7:15 a.m., 9:40–9:51 a.m.
- Location: Virginia Tech campus
- Targets: Students, staff and first responders
- Killed: 32
- Injured: 23 (17 from gunfire)
- Weapons: Walther P22; Glock 19

Korean name
- Hangul: 조승희
- Hanja: 趙承熙
- RR: Jo Seunghui
- MR: Cho Sŭnghŭi
- IPA: [tɕo sɯŋhi]

Seung-Hui Cho (Note: Some initial media reports referred to Cho's name as Cho Seung-hui, with the family name "Cho" appearing ahead of the given name in accordance with Korean naming custom. However, subsequent statements by the family indicated the preference for the Western ordering of Cho's name as Seung-hui Cho. Cho himself sometimes used the name Seung Cho. Cf.) (/ˌtʃoʊ sʌŋhiː/; Korean: 조승희; [tɕo sɯŋhi]; January 18, 1984 – April 16, 2007) was a South Korean mass murderer who perpetrated the Virginia Tech shooting on April 16, 2007. Cho killed 32 people and wounded 17 others at Virginia Tech in Blacksburg, Virginia, using two semi-automatic pistols. A senior-level student of creative writing at the university, Cho died by suicide after police breached the doors of Virginia Tech's Norris Hall which Cho had locked with heavy chains, where most of the shooting had taken place. The killing is the deadliest school shooting in U.S. history, and was at the time (Note: It was later surpassed by the Pulse nightclub shooting, which was itself surpassed by the 2017 Las Vegas shooting.) the deadliest mass shooting in U.S. history.

Born in South Korea, Cho was eight years old when he immigrated to the United States with his family. He became a U.S. permanent resident as a South Korean national. At the time of the shooting, Cho had the legal status of resident alien. In middle school, he was diagnosed with a severe anxiety disorder with selective mutism, as well as major depressive disorder. After his diagnosis, he began receiving treatment and continued to receive therapy and special education support until his junior year of high school. Cho was bullied throughout high school. During Cho's last two years at Virginia Tech, several instances of his abnormal behavior, as well as plays and other writings he submitted containing references to violence, caused concern among teachers and classmates.

In the aftermath of the shootings, Virginia governor Tim Kaine convened a panel consisting of various officials and experts to investigate and examine the response and handling of issues related to the shootings. The panel released its final report in August 2007, devoting more than 20 pages to detailing Cho's troubled history. In the report, the panel criticized the failure of the educators and mental health professionals who came into contact with Cho during his college years to notice his deteriorating condition and help him. The panel also criticized misinterpretations of privacy laws and gaps in Virginia's mental health system and gun laws. In addition, the panel faulted Virginia Tech administrators in particular for failing to take immediate action after the first two deaths of Emily J. Hilscher and Ryan C. "Stack" Clark. Nevertheless, the report did acknowledge that Cho must still be held primarily responsible for the killing, despite his "emotional and psychological disabilities [having] undoubtedly clouded his own situation".

== Early life and education ==
Cho was born on 18 January 1984, in the city of Asan, in the South Chungcheong Province of South Korea. Cho and his family lived in a basement apartment in Dobong District, Seoul, for a few years before immigrating to the United States. Cho's father was self-employed as a bookstore owner, but made minimal profits from the venture. Seeking better education and opportunities for his son and daughter, Cho's father immigrated to the United States with his family in 1992, when Cho was eight years old. The family lived in Detroit, then moved to the Washington metropolitan area after learning that it had one of the largest South Korean expatriate communities in the U.S. Cho's family settled in Centreville, an unincorporated community in western Fairfax County, Virginia, west of Washington, D.C. Cho's father and mother opened a dry-cleaning business. After they moved to Centreville, Cho and his family became permanent residents of the United States as South Korean nationals. His parents became members of a local Presbyterian church, and Cho was raised as a member of the religion, although in a note Cho "railed against his parents' strong Christian faith."

=== Family concerns about Cho's behavior during childhood ===
Some members of Cho's family who had remained in South Korea had concerns about his behavior during his early childhood. Cho's relatives thought that he was selectively mute or mentally ill and have stated in interviews that he rarely spoke or showed affection. During an ABC News Nightline interview on August 30, 2007, Cho's grandfather reported his concerns about Cho's behavior during childhood. According to Cho's grandfather, Cho never made eye contact, never called him grandfather, and never moved to embrace him.

=== Behavior in school ===
==== Elementary school ====
Cho attended Poplar Tree Elementary School in Chantilly, an unincorporated, small community in Fairfax County. An anonymous family acquaintance claimed that "Every time he came home from school he would cry and throw tantrums saying he never wanted to return to school". According to a former fifth-grade classmate of Cho's, Cho finished the three-year program at Poplar Tree Elementary School in one and a half years and was pointed to as a good example by teachers, and was not disliked by other students.

==== Middle and high school ====
Cho attended two schools in Fairfax County: Ormond Stone Middle School in Centreville and Westfield High School in Chantilly. He was reportedly bullied for his shyness and unusual speech mannerisms throughout high school, and at least once for his ethnicity. Other former classmates stated he was a loner who did not seem interested in interacting when teachers or other students tried to include him.

During Cho's ninth-grade year in 1999, the Columbine High School massacre made international news. Cho was reportedly transfixed by the news and idolized Eric Harris and Dylan Klebold. Cho wrote in a school assignment about wanting to "repeat Columbine". The school contacted Cho's sister, who reported the incident to their parents. Cho was sent to a psychiatrist.

Cho graduated from Westfield High School in 2003.

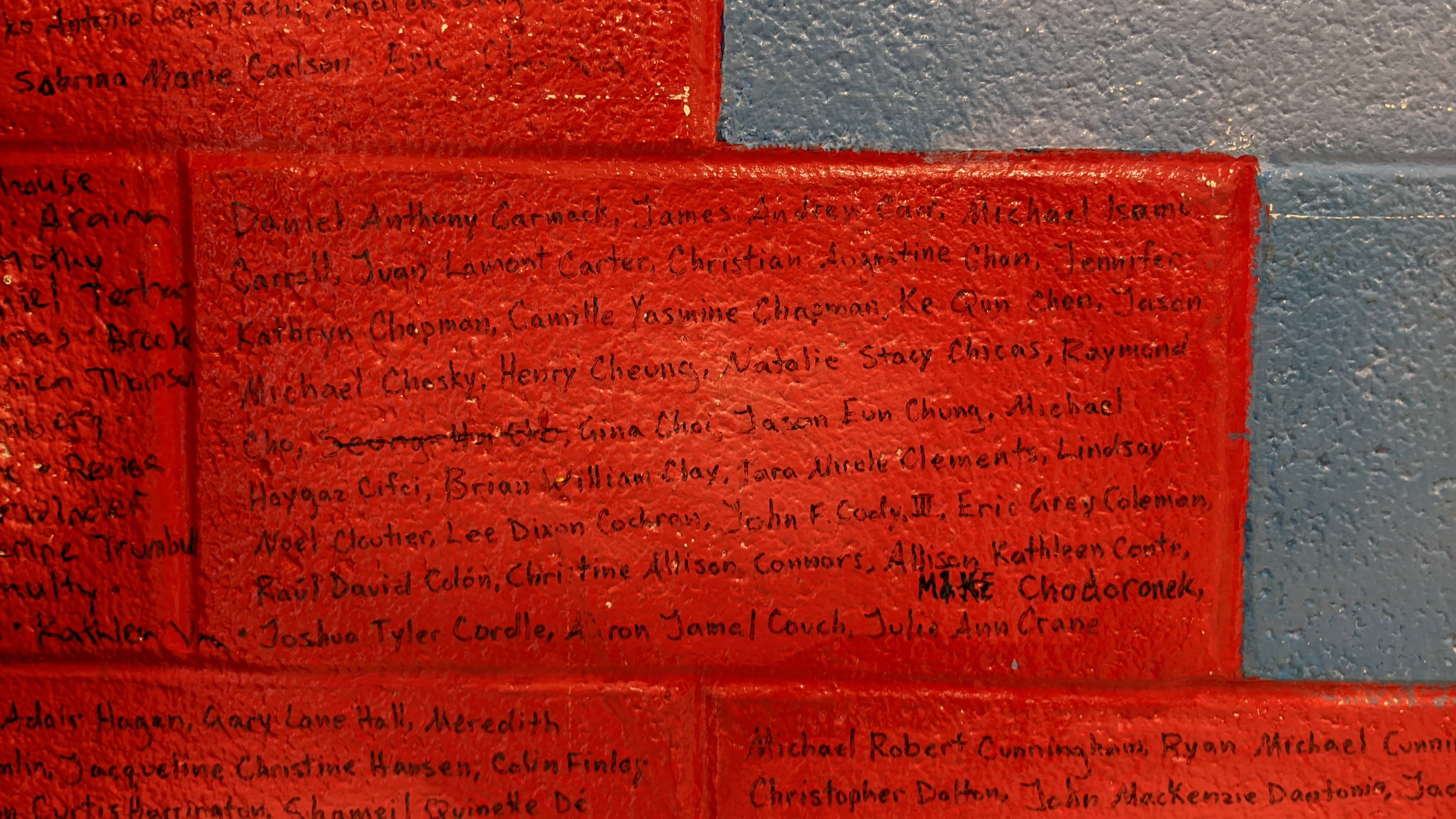
Seung-Hui Cho's struck-through signature at Westfield High School

=== Selective mutism diagnosis, possible autism ===
Cho was diagnosed with selective mutism, an anxiety disorder that inhibited him from speaking in specific instances and/or to specific individuals. The Virginia Tech Review Panel report, released in August 2007, placed this diagnosis in the spring of Cho's eighth-grade year; his parents sought treatment for him through medication and therapy. In high school, Cho was placed in special education under the "emotional disturbance" classification. He was excused from oral presentations and class conversation and received speech therapy. He continued receiving mental health therapy as well until the end of his junior year.

According to two of Cho's family members and one family friend, the Cho family had been told that Cho's mutism was due to autism; however, no known record exists of Cho being diagnosed with autism. The Virginia Tech Review Panel report states Cho's high school had ruled out an autism diagnosis. A clinical psychologist and expert in selective mutism said that based on Cho's videos, Cho "was not autistic. He clearly had the capability of talking to people." A 2017 paper from The Journal of Psychology states there is "[s]trong evidence suggesting Asperger's syndrome" for Cho.

To address his problems, Cho's parents also took him to church. According to a pastor at the Centreville Korean Presbyterian Church, Cho was a smart student who understood the Bible, but the pastor added that he had never heard Cho say a complete sentence. The pastor also recalled telling Cho's mother that he speculated Cho was autistic.

Federal law prohibited Westfield officials from disclosing any record of disability or treatment without Cho's permission; the officials disclosed none of Cho's speech and anxiety-related problems to Virginia Tech.

== Virginia Tech ==
In his freshman year at Virginia Tech in 2003, Cho enrolled as an undergraduate major in business information technology. By his senior year, Cho was majoring in English, intending to become a writer. At the time of the attacks, Cho lived with five roommates in a three-bedroom suite in Harper Hall.

=== Relationship with school officials ===
Nikki Giovanni said she taught Cho in a poetry class in the fall of 2005; she later had him removed from her class because she found his behavior "menacing." She recalled that Cho had a "mean streak" and described his writing as "intimidating." Giovanni reports that Cho wore sunglasses in class and that when she tried to get him to participate in class discussion, Cho remained silent. In Giovanni's classes Cho had intimidated female classmates by photographing their legs under their desks and by writing violent and obscene poetry. In the fall of 2005, Giovanni told the then-department head Lucinda Roy she "was willing to resign before [she] was going to continue with [Cho]." After this, Roy removed Cho from the class.

Roy says that since she found Cho's writings to be very disturbing, she asked for help from the police and the university administration; however, Roy states that the police had "difficulty" since Cho did not make any explicit threat. After Giovanni was informed of the massacre, she remarked that she "knew when it happened that that's probably who it was", and "would have been shocked if it wasn't." Roy had taught Cho in Introduction to Poetry the previous year. She described him as "actually quite arrogant and could be quite obnoxious, and was also deeply, it seemed, insecure" and that she told him numerous times to go to counseling. She said that Cho resisted speaking in class and took cell phone pictures of her. After Roy became concerned with Cho's behavior and the themes in his writings, she started meeting with Cho to work with him one-on-one. However, she soon became concerned for her safety, and told her assistant that she would use the name of a dead professor as a duress code, in order to alert the assistant to call security. After Roy notified authorities of Cho's behavior, she urged Cho to seek counseling. Roy described Cho as seeming "extraordinarily lonely", and said that Cho "said to me once he was lonely and didn't have friends."

Other professors were familiar with Cho's disturbing demeanor and recommended that Cho seek counseling. Some professors were not aware until informed by others that Cho had mental health problems and had been reported to the police, afterward speculating that "the information was not accessible" or was "privileged and could not be released."

=== Relationship with students ===
It is reported that in his first year at Virginia Tech, Cho tried to fit in, but had become very isolated in his last year. During one party, he sat in the corner and repeatedly stabbed the carpet in a girl's room while his roommates were present. Fellow students described Cho as a "quiet" person who "would not respond if someone greeted him." Student Julie Poole recalled that on the first day of a literature class the previous year, the professor found that Cho had written only a question mark instead of his name on a sign-in sheet, so "we just really knew him as the question mark kid."

Karan Grewal and Joseph Aust, who shared a dormitory suite with Cho, reported that Cho was reclusive and they mutually avoided interacting with him. Both roommates claim Cho had an imaginary girlfriend named "Jelly." Aust notes that during "the last couple weeks" he noticed that Cho's sleep schedule became unusual. Andy Koch and John Eide, who once shared a room with Cho at Cochrane Hall during 2005 and 2006, state that they were aware of the imaginary girlfriend as well. Koch claimed that Cho, under the influence of alcohol at a party, described "Jelly" as a supermodel living in space.

Koch described other incidents of disturbing behavior. Once, Cho stood in the doorway of his room late at night taking photographs of Koch. Cho repeatedly placed harassing cell phone calls to Koch as "Cho's brother, 'Question Mark'," a name Cho also used when introducing himself to girls. Koch and Eide searched Cho's belongings and found a pocket knife, but they did not find any items that they deemed threatening. Koch also described a telephone call that he received from Cho during the Thanksgiving holiday break from school, during which Cho claimed to be "vacationing with Vladimir Putin" in North Carolina. Koch and Eide, who had earlier tried to befriend him, gradually stopped talking to him and told their friends, especially female classmates, not to visit their room. On one instance, Cho told his roommates he had frightened a girl when he went to her dorm to look her in the eyes; Cho remarked he only found "promiscuity" in her eyes.

==== Incidents with female students ====
Koch and Eide stated that Cho had been involved in two incidents involving two different female students, which resulted in verbal warnings by the Virginia Tech campus police. The two students felt Cho was stalking them, but did not press charges. According to Koch, "Question Mark" was Cho's persona online to talk to girls. Koch stated that Cho used to call him on the phone using the alias Question Mark. Koch and Eide state that on at least two occasions, police came to their room to investigate a girl's complaint due to Cho's behavior online. According to Koch, one of these visits, during which the police came at night to Cho and Koch's dorm and banged at the door, was due to Cho's harassment of a female student and talking about suicide online.

The first such alleged incident occurred on November 27, 2005. Cho had contacted through phone calls and in person (by making an unannounced visit to her room) with a female student who notified Virginia Tech Police Department. The police said there were no actual threats of violence in those messages, but were simply annoying. Two uniformed members of the campus police visited Cho's room at the dormitory later that evening and warned him not to contact the student again; Cho complied.

The second alleged incident came to light on December 13, 2005. In the preceding days, Cho had contacted a friend of Koch via AIM and wrote on her door board a line from the Shakespeare play Romeo and Juliet. The young woman was initially unconcerned by the AIM messages and the quotation until she was contacted by Koch via AIM, who informed her of Cho's previous earlier stalking incident and speculated that Cho had schizophrenia. The young woman contacted the campus police, who again warned Cho against further unwanted contact.

Later the same day, Cho sent an e-mail to Koch stating, "I might as well kill myself now." Worried that Cho was suicidal, Koch contacted his father for advice. Both contacted campus authorities. The campus police returned to the dormitory and escorted Cho to New River Valley Community Services Board, the Virginia mental health agency serving Blacksburg.

== Psychiatric evaluation ==
=== Court-ordered psychiatric assessment ===
On December 13, 2005, Cho was taken by police to the psychiatric hospital of New River Valley Community Services Board. There, Crouse, the physician who examined Cho the same day, declared Cho was found "mentally ill and in need of hospitalization." He noted that Cho had a flat affect and depressed mood, and that Cho "denies suicidal ideation" and "does not acknowledge symptoms of a thought disorder." The physician also noted: "His insight and judgment are normal." Cho, suspected of being "an imminent danger to himself or others", was detained temporarily at Carilion St. Albans Behavioral Health Center in Radford, Virginia, pending a commitment hearing before the Montgomery County, Virginia, district court. On December 14, 2005, Cho was released from the mental health facility; after Cho's release, on the same day Virginia Special Justice Paul Barnett certified in an order that Cho "presented an imminent danger to himself as a result of mental illness," and ordered treatment for Cho as an outpatient. However, Cho did not receive the treatment which had been ordered, as due to Virginia's health system "[n]either the court, the university nor community services officials followed up on the judge's order".

Virginia state law on mental health disqualifications to firearms purchases, however, is worded slightly differently from the federal statute. So the form that Virginia courts use to notify state police about a mental health disqualification addresses only the state criteria, which list two potential categories that would warrant notification to the state police: someone who was "involuntarily committed" or ruled mentally "incapacitated".

Because Cho was not involuntarily committed to a mental health facility as an inpatient, he was still legally eligible to buy guns under Virginia law. However, according to Virginia law, "[a] magistrate has the authority to issue a detention order upon a finding that a person is mentally ill and in need of hospitalization or treatment." The magistrate also must find that the person is an imminent danger to himself or others. Virginia officials and other law experts have argued that, under United States federal law, Barnett's order meant that Cho had been "adjudicated as a mental defective" and was thus ineligible to purchase firearms under federal law; and that the state of Virginia erred in not enforcing the requirements of the federal law.

=== Family efforts ===
The Virginia Tech Review Panel noted numerous efforts by Cho's family to secure help for him as early as adolescence. However, when Cho reached 18 and left for college, the family lost its legal authority over him, and their influence on him waned. Cho's mother, increasingly concerned about his inattention to classwork, his classroom absences and his asocial behavior, sought help for him during summer 2006 from various churches in Northern Virginia. According to Dong Cheol Lee, minister of One Mind Presbyterian Church of Washington (located in Woodbridge), Cho's mother sought help from the church for Cho's problems. Lee added that "[Cho's] problem needed to be solved by spiritual power ... that's why she came to our church—because we were helping several people like him." Members of Lee's church told Cho's mother that he had "demonic power" and needed deliverance. Before the church could meet with the family, however, Cho returned to school to start his senior year at Virginia Tech.

== Virginia Tech shooting ==
Around 7:15 a.m. EDT (11:15 UTC) on April 16, 2007, Cho fatally shot two students, Emily J. Hilscher and Ryan C. "Stack" Clark, on the fourth floor of West Ambler Johnston Hall, a high-rise co-educational dormitory. Investigators later determined that Cho's shoes matched a blood-stained print found in the hallway outside Hilscher's room. The shoes and bloody jeans were found in Cho's dormitory room where he had stashed them after the attack.

Within the next two and a half hours, Cho returned to his room to rearm himself. He mailed a package to NBC News that contained pictures, digital video files, and documents. At approximately 9:45 a.m. EDT (13:45 UTC), he then crossed the campus to Norris Hall, a classroom building on the campus where, in a span of nine minutes, Cho shot dozens of people, killing 30 of them. As police breached the area of the building where Cho attacked the faculty and students, Cho killed himself in Norris 211 with a gunshot to his temple. The police identified Cho by matching immigration records with the fingerprints on the guns that were used in the shootings. Before the shootings, Cho's only known connection to Norris Hall was as a student in the sociology class, which he attended in a classroom on the second floor of the building. Although police had not stated positively at the time of the initial investigation that Cho was the perpetrator of the Norris Hall shootings and the earlier one at West Ambler Johnston Hall, forensic evidence confirmed that the same gun was used in both shooting incidents.

Trey Perkins, a student who saw Cho during the killing, reported that Cho was "just without even the slightest emotion on [his] face".

=== Preparation ===
In his manifesto, Cho says he had postponed the attack several times. Cho trained at a gun range up to three times before the shooting.

==== Weapons used in the attack ====
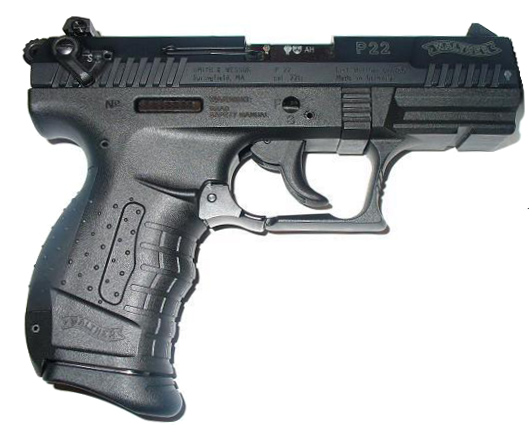
Walther P22 semi-automatic pistol

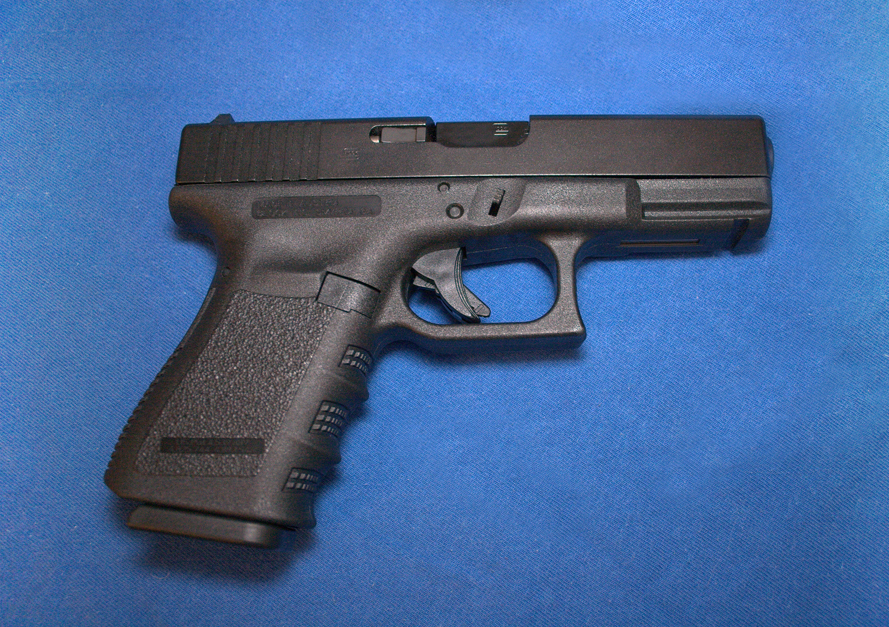
Glock 19 semi-automatic pistol

During February and March 2007, Cho began purchasing the weapons that he later used during the killings. On February 9, Cho purchased his first handgun, a .22-caliber Walther P22 semi-automatic pistol, from TGSCOM Inc., a federally licensed firearms dealer based in Green Bay, Wisconsin, and the operator of the website through which Cho ordered the gun. TGSCOM Inc. shipped the Walther P22 to JND Pawnbrokers in Blacksburg, Virginia, where Cho completed the legally required background check for the purchase transaction and took possession of the handgun. On March 13, Cho bought his second handgun, a 9 mm Glock 19 semi-automatic pistol, from Roanoke Firearms, a licensed gun dealer located in Roanoke, Virginia.

Cho was able to pass both background checks and successfully complete both handgun purchases after he presented to the gun dealers his U.S. permanent residency card, his Virginia driver's permit to prove legal age and length of Virginia residence and a checkbook showing his Virginia address, in addition to waiting the required 30-day period between each gun purchase. He was successful at completing both handgun purchases because he did not disclose on the background questionnaire that a Virginia court had ordered him to undergo outpatient treatment at a mental health facility.

On March 22, 2007, Cho purchased two 10-round magazines for the Walther P22 pistol through eBay from Elk Ridge Shooting Supplies in Idaho. Based on a preliminary computer forensics examination of Cho's eBay purchase records, investigators suspected that Cho may have purchased an additional 10-round magazine on March 23, 2007, from another eBay seller who sold gun accessories.

Cho also bought jacketed hollow-point bullets, which result in more tissue damage than full metal jacket bullets against unarmored targets by expanding upon entering soft tissue. Along with a manifesto, Cho later sent a photograph of the hollow-point bullets to NBC News with the caption "All the shit you've given me, right back at you with hollow points."

==== Motive ====
During the investigation, the police found a note in Cho's room in which he criticized "rich kids", "debauchery" and "deceitful charlatans". In the note, Cho continued by saying that "you caused me to do this." Early media reports also speculated that he was obsessed with a female student and became enraged after she rejected his romantic overtures. Law enforcement investigators could not find evidence that Hilscher knew Cho.

The Virginia Tech panel said that by sending the package to NBC, Cho "wanted his motivation to be known, though it comes across as largely incoherent, and it is unclear as to exactly why he felt such strong animosity."

=== Aftermath ===
==== Crime investigation ====
Law enforcement investigators used ballistics tests to determine that Cho fired the Glock 19 pistol during the attacks at the West Ambler Johnston dormitory and at Norris Hall on the Virginia Tech campus. Police investigators found that Cho fired more than 170 shots during the killing spree, evidenced by technicians finding at least 17 empty magazines at the scene. During the investigation, federal law enforcement investigators found that the serial numbers were illegally filed off on both the Walther P22 and the Glock 19 handguns used by Cho during the rampage. "Investigators also said that in mid-March, Cho practiced shooting at a firing range in Roanoke, about 40 miles from the campus." According to a former Federal Bureau of Investigation (FBI) agent and ABC consultant, "This was no spur-of-the-moment crime. He's been thinking about this for several months prior to the shooting."

The FBI tracked Cho's credit card transactions and found that he had paid an escort girl one month before the shooting. The escort stated that she and Cho met at a motel in Roanoke. She said she danced for Cho and decided to leave after 15 minutes, but Cho told her he had paid for a full hour. She stated that she then started dancing again and that thereafter Cho touched her and tried "to get on" her, at which point she pushed him away and Cho complied. The escort described Cho as "dorky," "timid" and a "little pushy."

==== Review of Cho's medical records ====
During the investigation, the matter of Cho's court-ordered mental health treatment was also examined to determine its outcome. Virginia investigators learned after a review of Cho's medical records that he never complied with the order for the mandated mental health treatment as an outpatient. The investigators also found that neither the court nor New River Valley Community Services exercised oversight of his case to determine his compliance with the order. In response to questions about Cho's case, New River Valley Community Services maintained that its facility was never named in the court order as the provider for his mental health treatment, and its responsibility ended once he was discharged from its care after the court order. In addition, Christopher Flynn, director of the Cook Counseling Center at Virginia Tech, mentioned that the court did not notify his office that Cho was required to seek outpatient mental health treatment. Flynn added that, "When a court gives a mandatory order that someone get outpatient treatment, that order is to the individual, not an agency ... The one responsible for ensuring that the mentally ill person receives help in these sort of cases ... is the mentally ill person."

As a result, Cho escaped compliance with the court order for mandatory mental health treatment as an outpatient, even though Virginia law required community services boards to "recommend a specific course of treatment and programs" for mental health patients and "monitor the person's compliance." As for the court, Virginia law also mandated that, if a person fails to comply with a court order to seek mental health treatment as an outpatient, that person can be brought back before the court "and if found still in crisis, can be committed to a psychiatric institution for up to 180 days." Cho was never summoned to court to explain why he had not complied with the December 14, 2005, order for mandatory mental health treatment as an outpatient.

The investigation panel had sought Cho's medical records for several weeks, but due to privacy laws, Virginia Tech was prohibited from releasing them without permission from Cho's family, even after his death. The panel had considered using subpoenas to obtain his records. On June 12, 2007, Cho's family released his medical records to the panel, although the panel said that the records were not enough. The panel obtained additional information by court order. Cho had been prescribed paroxetine years before the shooting but had been taken off it after one year. The toxicology test from the official autopsy later showed that neither psychiatric nor any kind of illegal drugs were in his system during the time of the shooting.

In August 2009, Virginia Tech released its medical records of Cho, along with those found in July 2009, to the public.

==== Investigative panel report ====
In the aftermath of the killing spree, Virginia Governor Timothy Kaine appointed a panel to investigate the campus shootings, with plans for the panel to submit a report of its findings in approximately two to three months. Kaine also invited former Homeland Security Secretary Tom Ridge to join the panel to "review Cho's mental health history and how police responded to the tragedy." To help investigate and analyze the emergency response surrounding the Virginia Tech shooting, Kaine hired TriData Corporation, the same company that investigated the Columbine High School massacre.

The panel's final report devoted more than 20 pages to detailing Cho's mental health history. The report criticized Virginia Tech educators, administrators and mental health staff in failing to "connect the dots" from numerous incidents that were warning signs of Cho's mental instability beginning in his junior year. The report concluded that the school's mental health systems "failed for lack of resources, incorrect interpretation of privacy laws, and passivity." The report called Virginia's mental health laws "flawed" and its mental health services "inadequate". The report also confirmed that Cho was able to purchase two guns in violation of federal law because of Virginia's inadequate background check requirements.

An addendum to the report was published in November 2009; an updated version of the addendum was published in December of the same year.

The records of the panel were released in July 2017.

==== Reaction of Cho's family ====
Cho's older sister prepared a statement on her family's behalf to apologize publicly for her brother's actions, in addition to lending prayers to the victims and the families of the wounded and killed victims. "This is someone that I grew up with and loved. Now I feel like I didn't know this person," she said in the statement issued through a North Carolinian attorney. "We never could have envisioned that he was capable of so much violence." Cho's grandfather stated, "My grandson Seung-Hui was very shy. I can't believe he did such a thing."

In a 2008 article marking the anniversary of the massacre, The Washington Post did a follow-up on the family, reporting that they had gone into hiding for months following the massacre and, after eventually returning home to Centreville, had "virtually cut themselves off from the world." Several windows in their home had been papered over and drawn blinds covered the rest. The only real outside contact they maintained was with an FBI agent assigned to their care and their lawyer, refusing even to contact their own relatives in South Korea.

== Media package sent to NBC News ==
Screenshot from the MSNBC coverage of several videos Seung-Hui Cho sent to NBC News

A still of Cho holding two pistols he sent in his package to NBC News

During the time period between the two shooting events on April 16, Cho visited a local post office near the Virginia Tech campus where he mailed a parcel with a DVD inside to the New York headquarters of NBC News, which contained video clips, photographs and a manifesto explaining the reasons for his actions. The package was apparently intended to be received on April 17, but was delayed by one day because of an incorrect ZIP code and street address.

=== "Ishmael" ===
The name of the sender on the package according to NBC News was "A. Ishmael" (or "Ismael" according to The New York Times). According to NBC News, the words "Ismail Ax" (or "Ismail-Ax" in red ink according to ABC News, "Ismail Ax" in red ink according to The Times) were scrawled on one of Cho's arms. It was reported a few days after the package was received that "the Internet is abuzz with speculation about the meaning of the phrase 'Ismail Ax' on Cho's arm, 'A. Ishmael' on the package and 'axishmiel' on [a] file [contained in the package sent to NBC]".

One hypothesis is that "Ismail Ax" represents divine retribution in reference to the Islamic belief that Abraham, the father of Ishmael, broke some idols with his axe to abolish idol worship, or to the Islamic belief that God asked Abraham to sacrifice the innocent Ishmael; no one reported Cho was Muslim, and he refers to himself in Christian terms and refers to the Crucifixion of Jesus, which is not part of Islamic beliefs.

Another hypothesis for the name "Ismail-Ax" is that it could be a reference to Drum Hadley's poem "The Goat Ranchers" which talk about "Ishmael's Ax". Other hypotheses are that "Ishmael", "Ishmael Ax" and "axishmiel" were references to Ishmael, narrator of Herman Melville's Moby-Dick, or to a set of books by Daniel Quinn that features a gorilla named Ishmael that examines humankind. It has also been suggested Ismail Ax refers to Ishmael Bush, the hero of James Fenimore Cooper's novel The Prairie.

It was also suggested "Ishmael", "Ishmael Ax" and "axishmiel" could refer to Ismail Ak, a professor of psychiatry at a Turkish university whose studies include psychiatry of anti-social and suicidal behavior." Among the other suggestions were anagrams that referred to the ancient punishment of pouring salt on fields that made them incapable of growing crops, a Bob Marley song called 'Small Axe,' and a technology called 'AxisMail' that lets users have e-mail messages sent to their cell phones." It was also theorized that "Ismail-Ax" was a reference to the meaning of "Ishmael" which is "exile" or "outcast" according to Webster's dictionary. Another theory is that "Ismail Ax" referred to a XboxLive (XBL) handle, but an XBL search made at the time did not find any such handle.

A short story written by Cho in October 2006 titled "Man-Bitches" features a protagonist with the name "Ax Manson". This suggests the pseudonym "Ax" was a reference to his past work. In the story, Ax Manson is subjected to physical abuse from his father and bullying by his peers, which he seeks to escape from after winning a large sum of money from a casino.

In his PDF mailed to NBC, Cho states: "Children of Ishmael, Crusaders of Anti-Terrorism, my Jesus Christ Brothers and Sisters - you're in my heart. ... I saw [sic] we take up the cross, Children of Ishmael, take up our guns, and knives and any sharp object, and spare no lives until our last breath and last ounce of energy. ... I am Ax Ishmael. I am the Anti-Terrorist of America".

=== Release of material ===
Upon receiving the package on April 18, 2007, NBC News contacted authorities and made the controversial decision to publicize Cho's communications by releasing a small fraction of what it received. After pictures and images from the videos were broadcast in numerous news reports, students and faculty from Virginia Tech, along with relatives of victims of the campus shooting, expressed concerns that glorifying Cho's rampage could lead to copycat killings. The airing of the manifesto and its video images and pictures was upsetting to many who were more closely affected by the shootings: Peter Read, the father of Mary Read, one of the students who were killed by Cho during the rampage, asked the media to stop airing Cho's manifesto.

Police officials, who reviewed the video, pictures and manifesto, concluded that the contents of the media package had marginal value in helping them learn and understand why Cho committed the killings. Michael Welner, who also reviewed the materials, believed that Cho's rantings offer little insight into the mental illness that may have triggered his rampage. Welner stated that "[t]hese videos do not help us understand Cho. They distort him. He was meek. He was quiet. This is a PR tape of him trying to turn himself into a Quentin Tarantino character."

During the April 24, 2007, edition of The Oprah Winfrey Show, NBC News president Steve Capus stated NBC decided to air 2 minutes and 20 seconds of the 25 minutes of videos it received and just 37 sentences of the 23 pages of writings.

=== Content ===
Cho's package contained what the NBC called a "multimedia manifesto": a DVD, along with "a printout of a .pdf file". This printout's PDF file was contained in the DVD with the file name 'axishmiel': Cho's 1,800-word, 23-page manifesto which also contained 43 photographs of Cho. Along with this file, the DVD also contained two Microsoft Word files, a six-minute audio .avi file, and 27 QuickTime video clips.

The PDF had been last modified on April 16 at 7:24 a.m., "minutes after he had shot and killed his first two victims, and nearly two hours before he went on his second rampage." The Microsoft Word files "were drafts of the two sections of the manifesto, which he had written earlier, one being last modified on April 13 at 3:45 p.m. and on April 15 at 8:22 a.m. The sole .avi file of him reading the manifesto, titled 'letter1' was recorded even earlier, at 9:40 a.m. on April 10, a full six days before the massacre." The 27 QuickTime videos together total 24 minutes and are "ranging in length from 16 seconds to six minutes". The titles of those other video clips "are varied and hard to match with their content: 'all of You,' 'am al qaeda,' 'anti terror,' 'as time appr,' 'blood of inno,' 'congrad,' 'could b victim.' The rambling comments are those of an angry young man who felt persecuted, who felt that the world is against him, who felt he was a victim of personal terrorism." Five of the videos are titled "end," "end 1," "end 2," "end car" and "end some life." Those five seem "to be among the last recorded, perhaps between the shootings." In those five videos, Cho "addresses no one by name ..., although he does seemingly address Virginia Tech students in two as 'brats' and 'snobs' with 'Mercedes' and 'trust funds.'"

In his manifesto, Cho mentioned the Columbine killers Eric Harris and Dylan Klebold, and also makes references to hedonism and Christianity while expressing anger about unspecified wrongs that were done to him.

Pete Williams, an MSNBC justice correspondent, said that Cho lacked logical governance, suggesting that Cho was under severe emotional distress. In the video, Cho also railed against deceitful charlatans on campus, "rich kids," materialism, and hedonism, saying: "Did you want to inject as much misery in our lives as you can just because you can?"

In one of his videos, "[Cho] repeatedly suggests he was picked on or otherwise hurt", saying: "You have vandalised my heart, raped my soul and tortured my conscience. You thought it was one pathetic more life you were extinguishing. Thanks to you, I die like Jesus Christ, to inspire generations of the weak and the defenseless people." On another instance, Cho mentions "martyrs like Eric and Dylan". Cho also stated in the videos: "You forced me into a corner and gave me only one option."

One of Cho's roommates, Karan Grewall, stated the place where Cho's videos were taken "looks exactly like our common areas where we hang out every day. I can't be sure, but the walls look exactly like our suite."

== Writings ==
According to the Virginia Tech report, Cho "seemed to enjoy the idea of writing, especially poetry," and attempted to get a book published while in college. After the mass shooting, a former classmate of Cho provided AOL with two plays written by Cho. An AOL official said the authenticity of the plays was verified by AOL before they were posted online. The plays included Richard McBeef and Mr. Brownstone, both written in 2006.

Approximately one year before the incident at Virginia Tech, Cho wrote a paper for an assignment in an "Intro to Short Fiction" class. In that paper, Cho wrote about a mass school murder that was planned by the protagonist of the story. In the story, the protagonist did not follow through with the killings. During the proceedings of the Virginia Tech panel, the panel was unaware of the existence of the paper written by Cho.

Additionally, in March 2006 at Virginia Tech's 22nd Annual Research Symposium and Exposition, Cho submitted a poem titled "Spear me down, Heaven" to the Advanced Undergraduate category. The poem included violent lines including a "wish to annihilate my self" and "tear me to shrivels, eat me to help me".

When information surfaced about the paper, the Virginia Tech panel learned at that time that only the Virginia State Police and Virginia Tech had copies of the unreleased paper in their possession. The Virginia State Police reported that, although it had a copy of the paper, Virginia law prevented them from releasing the paper to the panel because it was part of the investigative file in an ongoing investigation. Virginia Tech, on the other hand, had known about the paper, and officials at the school discussed the contents of the paper among themselves in the aftermath of the shootings. According to Governor Kaine, "[Virginia Tech] was expected to turn over all of Cho's writings to the panel" during the proceedings of the Virginia Tech panel. After some members of the Virginia Tech panel complained about the missing paper, Virginia Tech decided to release a copy of the paper to the panel during the latter part of the week of August 25, 2007.

=== Reactions to writings ===
Edward Falco, a playwriting professor at Virginia Tech, has acknowledged that Cho wrote both the released plays in his class. Falco said of the plays: "They're not good writing. But they are at least a form of communication. And in his responses to the other students' plays, he could be quite articulate." Another professor who taught Cho characterized his work as "very adolescent" and "silly", with attempts at "slapstick comedy" and "elements of violence". Classmates believed "the plays were really morbid and grotesque."

According to CBS News, "Cho Seung-Hui's violent writing [and] loner status fit the Secret Service shooter profile," referring to a 2002 U.S. Secret Service study that was conducted after the Columbine massacre, with violent writing cited as one of the most typical behavioral attributes of school shooters. The U.S. Secret Service concluded the study by saying that "[t]he largest group of [school shooters] exhibited an interest in violence in their own writings, such as poems, essays or journal entries," while school shooters' interest in other violent media was generally low.

Users on the website Something Awful created a parody "CliffsNotes" entry describing Richard McBeef.

== Postmortem influence ==
Wellington Menezes Oliveira, the perpetrator of the Rio de Janeiro school shooting who killed 12 people, considered Cho "a brother and an icon in the fight against the infidels."

A teenager who intentionally set fire to a classroom in South Korea in 2015 said he "wanted to leave behind a record like Cho Seung-hui". No one died as a result of this fire.

It was reported in 2015 that some South Korean internet users glorified the Virginia Tech killings and affectionately called Cho "General Cho". In 2017, after the United Express Flight 3411 incident was reported, numerous people on the South Korean internet commemorated Cho, saying for example "I miss General Cho Seung-Hui". It is from the DCinside forum in 2014 that came the idea of calling Cho a "general" of the "battle of Virginia" (the name given by the forum to the Virginia Tech killings); the forum hailed Cho as a hero against racism toward Koreans. The nickname "general" stemmed from the idea that Cho killed numerous people despite only being one person, thus making him an apparent genius tactician. Over the years, Cho became a symbol of resistance against what Korean internet users perceived as anti-Korean racism, on any subject.
