= William & Mary Police Department =

University police department in Virginia, US

Coordinates: 37.2679°N 76.7179°W

Jurisdictional structure
- Legal jurisdiction: College of William & Mary

Operational structure
- Agency executive: Don Butler, Chief
- Specialty units: Community Outreach Programs, Bicycle Unit

Website
- www.wm.edu/offices/police/

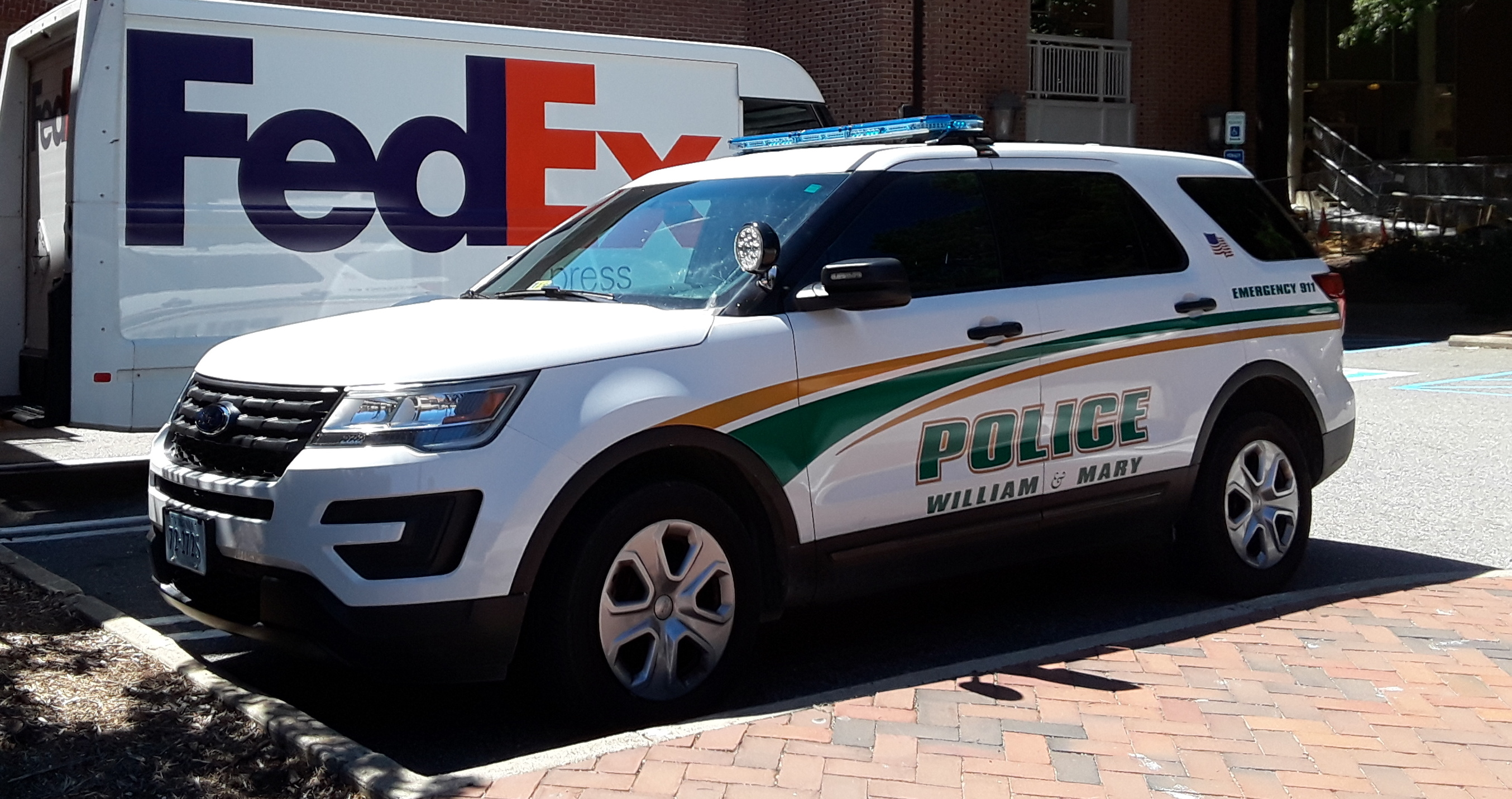
An SUV of the William & Mary Police, parked outside the campus police office

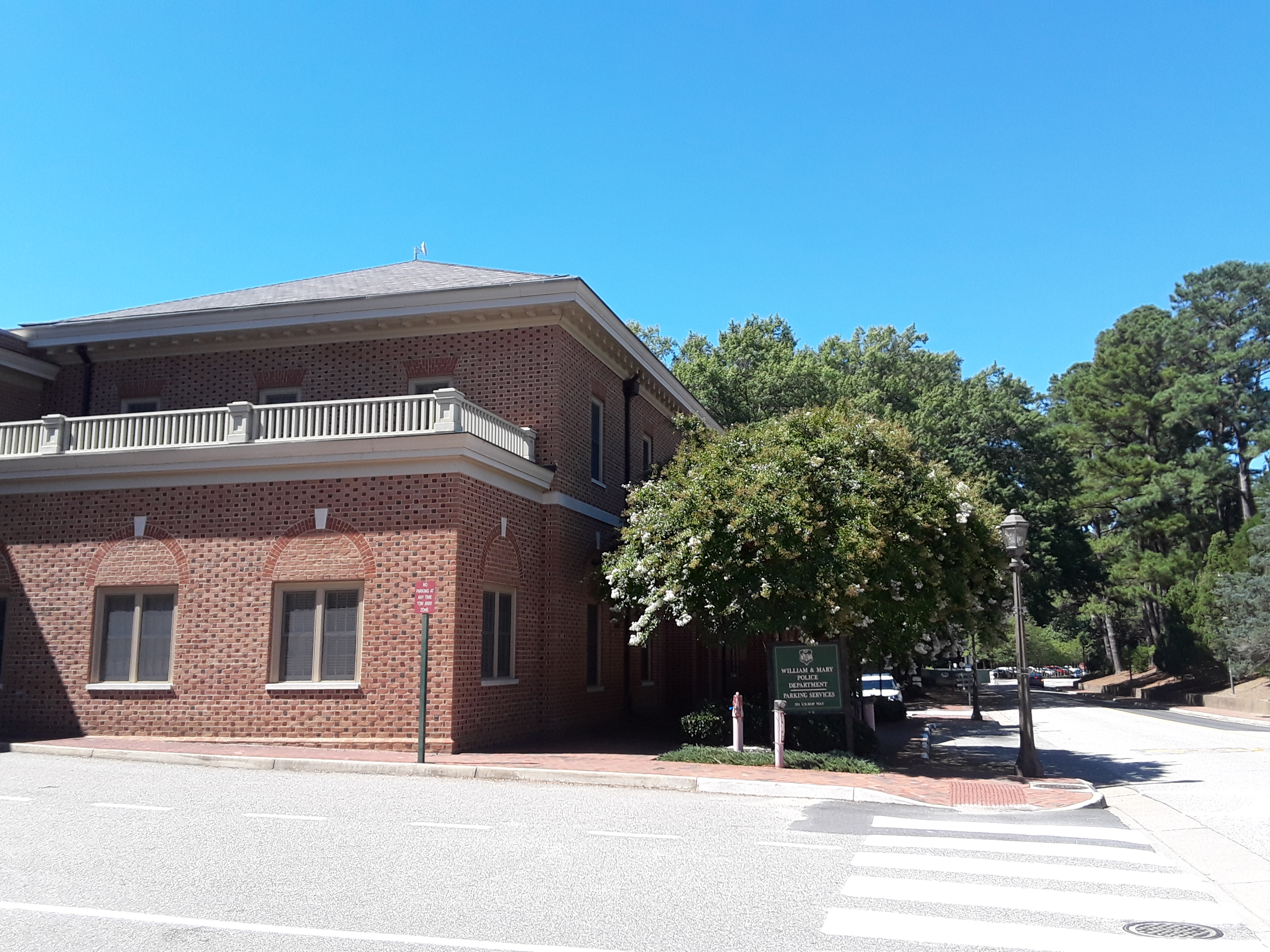
Office of the William & Mary Police, attached to the campus parking deck

The William & Mary Police Department (WMPD) is a Virginia accredited police department with jurisdiction over the College of William & Mary located in Williamsburg, Virginia, United States. The department's accreditation with the Virginia Law Enforcement Professional Standards Commission was awarded on February 9, 2001. The department was again accredited in 2019.

The department is located on campus in the office area of the parking garage at 201 Ukrop Way near Swem Library. Its emergency response operates 24 hours a day, 365 days per year.

As of 2009, the department had 20 full-time police officers, 2 part-time police officers, and 1 Auxiliary Officer. The officers are complemented in their duties by five dispatchers and 1 unarmed security officer. The department also employs one investigator.

On September 15, 2014, Deborah Cheesebro became the first female police chief in William & Mary's 321-year history. In 2008, the department received 4 M16 rifles through the United States Department of Defense's Excess Property Program. After the Ferguson unrest, the program's dispersal of combat equipment to local police came under scrutiny. The process to return the four automatic rifles, which the officers never trained with or used, was initiated shortly after Cheesbro became police chief; the rifles were returned in April 2015. In 2020, Cheesebro was elected president of the Virginia Association of Campus Law Enforcement Administrators. In January 2023, Cheesebro announced she would retire in spring that year.

In April 2018, the Williamsburg Police Department and Tri-Rivers Drug Task Force arrested ten people as part of a drug crime investigation. Among them were eight students and a professor. WMPD reported that it was not made aware of the investigation until after the arrests had taken place.

In November 2023, Don Butler was selected as the chief of the WMPD; he had served as interim chief since June 1 that year. Butler joined the department in 2012. WMPD officers have jurisdiction and legal authority on all university-owned property and work closely and share jurisdiction with the Williamsburg Police Department, the James City County Sheriff's Department and other law enforcement agencies.

== See also ==
- Virginia Tech Police Department
