= Kim Yu-sik =

South Korean entrepreneur

- Born: February 17, 1971 (age 55); Seoul, South Korea
- Other names: 유식대장 ('Yu-Sik Daejang', captain Yu-Sik)
- Occupation: Entrepreneur
- Known for: Founder and current administrator of DC Inside

Korean name
- Hangul: 김유식
- Hanja: 金裕植
- RR: Gim Yusik
- MR: Kim Yusik
- IPA: ki.myu.ɕik̚

Kim Yu-sik (Korean: 김유식; Korean pronunciation: [ki.myu.ɕik̚]; born 17 February 1971) is the founder of the South Korean Internet community DC Inside. In 2005, he married Park Yoo-jin, the editor-in-chief of DC News.

== Life ==
=== Early life ===
Thanks to his journalist father, he encountered computer earlier than other children. In early 1980s, in his sixth grade at elementary school, he learned to use a computer at Hagwon. In the 1990s, gaining reputation on internet by humorous posts on HiTEL's humor board, he decided to make money from the internet, and went abroad to study at Japan's Shinjuku Information Business School, but dropped out, disappointed that it taught using Japanese word processors on XT-16-bit computers instead of website creation. He grew a business on selling Japanese electronic devices and Game/Movie CDs to Korean PC network's buy/sell board on a high price. After returning to Korea in 1995, he started posting laptop user reviews on HiTEL's notebook club.

=== Founding DC Inside ===
HiTEL suggested him to write laptop reviews on World Wide Web. He created two websites, one about laptops and one about Digital cameras. The latter is DC Inside, while the former Notebook Inside (Korean: 노트북인사이드) is soon closed.
