= Walther SP22 =

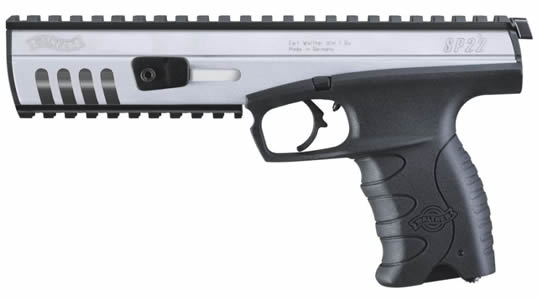
- Walther SP22 - M3
- Type: Semi-automatic pistol
- Place of origin: Germany

Production history
- Designed: 2007
- Manufacturer: Carl Walther GmbH Sportwaffen
- Produced: 2008–2010
- Variants: See Variants: SP22 - M1; SP22 - M2; SP22 - M3; SP22 - M4

Specifications
- Mass: 27 oz (770 g) (M1); 27 oz (770 g) (M2); 27 oz (770 g) (M3); 32.5 oz (920 g) (M4)
- Length: 7.68 in (19.5 cm) (M1); 9.65 in (24.5 cm) (M2); 9.65 in (24.5 cm) (M3); 10.24 in (26.0 cm) (M4)
- Barrel length: 4 in (10 cm) (M1); 6 in (15 cm) (M2); 6 in (15 cm) (M3); 6 in (15 cm) (M4)
- Width: 1.5 in (3.8 cm) (M1); 1.5 in (3.8 cm) (M2); 1.5 in (3.8 cm) (M3); 1.97 in (5.0 cm) (M4)
- Height: 5.11 in (13.0 cm) (M1); 5.11 in (13.0 cm) (M2); 5.11 in (13.0 cm) (M3); 6.1 in (15 cm) (M4)
- Cartridge: .22 Long Rifle (5.6 mm)
- Action: Blowback operated, Single action
- Feed system: 10-round detachable box magazine
- Sights: Adjustable notch and post sight

The SP22 is a modular semi-automatic pistol manufactured by Walther Sportwaffen and distributed by Smith & Wesson. The SP22 is chambered in .22 LR (5.6 mm) and is designed for sport and competition shooting. It is manufactured with a composite receiver, aluminum housing, and all-steel internal components. Walther has four different models of the SP22: the SP22 M1, SP22 M2, SP22 M3 and SP22 M4, as well as multiple accessories for customizing.

== Variants ==
=== SP22 M1 ===
The basic version of the pistol is the SP22 M1. The M1 is equipped with a 4-inch (10 cm) standard barrel, adjustable steel sights, and a two-stage trigger complete with adjustable trigger stop.

=== SP22 M2 ===
The M2 model features a longer, 6-inch (15 cm) barrel for increased velocity and accuracy.

=== SP22 M3 ===
The M3 model features a 6-inch (15 cm) match-grade barrel along with an adjustable match trigger. It also has removable Picatinny-style rails on top of, and underneath the housing. The M3 also comes larger polymer grips, and a quick-release magazine catch.

=== SP22 M4 ===
The M4 model retains the same standard features that are found on the M3, but includes a contoured adjustable wooden grip with hand support, and lacks the Picatinny-style rails.

== See also ==
- Walther P22
