= Gun laws in Virginia =

Location of Virginia in the United States

Gun laws in Virginia regulate the sale, possession, and use of firearms and ammunition in the Commonwealth of Virginia in the United States.

== Summary table ==
Subject / law	Long guns	Handguns	Relevant statutes	Notes
State permit required to purchase?	No	No		
Firearm registration?	No	No	§ 18.2-295	Fully automatic firearms (machine guns) are required to be registered with the state police.
Owner license required?	No	No		Proof of age and citizenship required for the purchase of firearms.
Permit required for concealed carry?	N/A	Yes	§ 18.2-308	Virginia is a "shall issue" state for concealed carry. Permits are issued to residents and non-residents. As of January 1, 2021, the option of obtaining training via an electronic, video or online course will be removed. In a vehicle, a firearm is exempt from the requirement for a concealed carry permit if the firearm is "properly secured in a container or compartment within the vehicle" (ie glove box, center console, trunk, etc). The container/compartment does not have to be locked, the firearm may be within the reach of the driver or a passenger, and the firearm may be loaded. This does not preempt an employer from prohibiting firearms "at a place of employment if there is a company policy or signage prohibiting firearms on the premises." Furthermore, a "county or city may by ordinance make it unlawful for any person to transport, possess or carry a loaded shotgun or loaded rifle in any vehicle on any public street, road, or highway within such locality." However, this does not "apply to duly authorized law-enforcement officers or military personnel in the performance of their lawful duties, nor to any person who reasonably believes that a loaded rifle or shotgun is necessary for his personal safety in the course of his employment or business."
Permit required for open carry?	No	No	§ 15.2-915.2 § 18.2-287.4 § 18.2-282	Open carry is generally allowed without a permit for people 18 years of age and older. The following cities and counties have exceptions that disallow the open carry of a loaded semi-automatic center-fire rifle or pistol that expels single or multiple projectiles by action of an explosion of a combustible material and is equipped at the time of the offense with a magazine that will hold more than 20 rounds of ammunition or designed by the manufacturer to accommodate a silencer or equipped with a folding stock or shotguns equipped with a magazine that holds more than 7 rounds: the Cities of Alexandria, Chesapeake, Fairfax, Falls Church, Newport News, Norfolk, Richmond, and Virginia Beach and in the Counties of Arlington, Fairfax, Henrico, Loudoun, and Prince William. These restrictions do not apply to valid concealed carry permit holders. Stated differently, one may open carry an assault weapon/shotgun with more than 7 rounds with a permit in the aforementioned locations, but do not need a permit to do so in any other locality in Virginia. In a vehicle, a firearm may be considered "openly carried" if the firearm is openly visible, though this is not as well established as the "secured in a container/compartment" rule mentioned above.
State preemption of local restrictions?	Yes	Yes	§ 15.2-915	Virginia has state preemption for most but not all firearm laws. As of July 1, 2020, local governments have expanded power to ban firearms in certain sensitive areas, such as government buildings and public events.
Assault weapon law?	Yes	Yes	§ 18.2-308.2:2 § 18.2-308.2:01 § 18.2-308.7	Proof of age (18+ for long arms, 21+ for pistols) and proof of citizenship (or permanent residence license) are required for the purchase of "assault weapons". "Assault weapons" are defined as a semi-automatic, centerfire, firearm equipped with a folding stock, or equipped at the time with a magazine capable of holding more than 20 rounds, or capable of accommodating a silencer/suppressor.
Magazine restriction?	No	No	§ 18.2-287.4 § 18.2-282.	Magazines capable of holding more than 20 rounds are legal but, they make the firearm an "assault weapon", subject to law accordingly.
NFA weapons restricted?	No	No	§ 18.2-308.8 § 18.2-308.5 § 18.2-295	Fully automatic firearms (machine guns) must be registered with the state police. Plastic firearms and some destructive devices (such as the striker 12 shotgun) are prohibited outside law enforcement. SBS, SBR, AOWs, and suppressors are legal with NFA paperwork.
Background checks required for private sales?	Yes	Yes	18.2-308.2:5	As of July 1, 2020, firearms sellers, with some exceptions, must obtain criminal history information from the Virginia State Police to determine if a firearm buyer is permitted, under applicable state and federal law, to purchase or possess firearms. Notably, the law does not apply to transfers of firearms in which nothing of value is exchanged for the firearm. The penalty for noncompliance with the law is a Class 1 misdemeanor. In Virginia, Class 1 misdemeanors are punishable by up to 1 year in jail and a $2,500 fine.
Red flag law?	Yes	Yes		A judge can issue an Extreme Risk Protective Order, enabling the police to temporarily confiscate the firearms of a person deemed to be at high risk of harming themselves or others.

Gun laws in Virginia

Constitution
- Constitution sections: Article I, §13.
- Synopsis "... the right of the people to keep and bear arms shall not be infringed; …"

Preemption and local regulation
- Preemption sections: § 15.2-915., § 15.2–915.1., § 15.2–915.2., § 15.2–915.4., § 15.2-914.
- Synopsis Localities may regulate the transportation of a loaded rifle or shotgun, regulate the use of pneumatic guns, and the possession and storage of firearms by persons who provide child-care services.

Registration
- Ownership registration sections: § 18.2–295.
- Synopsis Machine guns must be registered with the Virginia State Police.
- Purchase registration No purchase registration
- Lost/stolen registration No lost/stolen registration

Restricted or prohibited items
- Restricted firearms sections: § 18.2–308.8., § 18.2–308.5.
- Synopsis Armsel Striker, also known as the Striker 12, and similar shotguns are prohibited. Plastic firearms are prohibited.
- Restricted ammunition No restricted ammunition
- Restricted accessories No restricted accessories

Restricted or prohibited places
- Restricted places sections: § 18.2–283., AG Opinion 11-043, § 18.2–283.1., § 18.2–287.01., § 18.2–287.4., § 18.2–308.1., 4VAC15-40-60., 4VAC10-30-170., 8VAC35-60-20. GA JRC Rule, § 18.2–308.
- Synopsis: Places of religious worship, without good and sufficient reason. The Attorney General has opined that personal protection constitutes a good and sufficient reason.; Courthouses.; Air carrier airport terminals.; Certain high-capacity firearms in public places in certain counties and cities; except certain persons.; Public, private or religious elementary, middle or high schools and associated buildings, grounds, buses, and events; except certain persons.; On George Mason University property in academic buildings, administrative office buildings, student residence buildings, dining facilities, or while attending sporting, entertainment or educational events; except police officers.; Anywhere on a Virginia Commonwealth University campus, without the written authorization of the president of the university; except persons whose duties lawfully require the possession of firearms.; The Capitol and the General Assembly building; except for members of the General Assembly, persons with concealed handgun permits, and law enforcement personnel.; Private property where prohibited by the owner.

Restricted or prohibited persons
- Underage persons sections: § 18.2–56.2., § 18.2–308.7.
- Synopsis: Persons under the age of 12, except while supervised.; Persons over the age of 12, but under the age of 18, except while supervised; or unsupervised with parental and property owner permission.
- Alien persons sections: § 18.2–308.2:01.
- Synopsis: Persons who are not lawfully present in the United States may not possess, transport or carry any firearm.; Persons who are not citizens or lawful permanent residents may not possess an "assault firearm."
- Restricted persons sections: § 18.2–308.1:1., § 18.2–308.1:2., § 18.2–308.1:3., § 18.2–308.1:4.
- Synopsis: Persons acquitted by reason of insanity.; Persons adjudicated legally incompetent, mentally incapacitated.; Persons involuntarily admitted to a facility or ordered to mandatory outpatient treatment.; Persons subject to protective orders.
- Convicted persons sections: § 18.2–290., § 18.2–308.1:5., § 18.2–308.2.
- Synopsis: Persons convicted of a crime of violence in any court of record may not possess a machine gun.; Persons convicted of certain drug offenses; for a period of five years.; Persons who have been convicted of a felony, kidnapping, robbery by the threat or presentation of firearms, or rape.

Manufacturing
- Manufacturing regulations sections: § 18.2–294., § 18.2–304., § 18.2–308.5.
- Synopsis: Manufacturers must keep a record of all machine guns, sawed-off rifles and sawed-off shotguns that they manufacture.; Manufacturers are subject to police inspection of their stock of machine guns, sawed-off rifles, and sawed-off shotguns.; It is unlawful to manufacture firearms containing less than 3.7 ounces of electromagnetically detectable metal in the barrel, slide, cylinder, frame or receiver.

Sale, purchase, and transfer
- Dealer regulations sections: § 18.2–294., § 18.2–304., § 18.2–308.2:1., § 18.2–308.2:3. § 18.2–308.2:2.,
- Synopsis: Dealers are subject to police inspection of their stock of machine guns, sawed-off rifles, and sawed-off shotguns.; Dealers may not sell or otherwise furnish firearms to any person he knows is prohibited from possessing or transporting a firearm.; Criminal background checks of employees of gun dealers are required before they may transfer firearms.; Criminal history record information check required for the transfer of certain firearms.; Non-residents may purchase rifle and shotguns only
- Private sale regulations sections: § 18.2–308.2:1., § 18.2–308.2:2.
- Synopsis: Private sellers may not sell or otherwise furnish firearms to any person he knows is prohibited from possessing or transporting a firearm.; Private sellers may sell long guns and handguns.

Transportation and carry
- Transportation restrictions sections: § 15.2–915.2., § 18.2–308.
- Synopsis: Localities may regulate the transportation of a loaded rifle or shotgun.; Persons lawfully possessing a handgun may transport such handgun loaded and in a secure compartment in a vehicle or vessel.
- Open carry restrictions sections: § 18.2–308.
- Synopsis: There is no law against a law-abiding citizen openly carrying a firearm, therefore it is legal and no permit or license is required.; "Open carry" is the carrying of a firearm that is not concealed. Virginia defines concealed as "hidden from common observation" and "a weapon shall be deemed to be hidden from common observation when it is observable but is of such deceptive appearance as to disguise the weapon's true nature."
- Concealed carry restrictions sections: § 18.2–308, § 18.2–308.012
- Synopsis: Only persons who hold certain positions, comply with certain rules or restrictions, and/or who have a Concealed Handgun Permit (CHP) may carry concealed handguns.; Virginia issues a CHP to residents and non-residents.; CHP applicants must provide proof of demonstrated competence with a handgun.; Some persons are deemed disqualified from obtaining a CHP, even though they may lawfully possess and carry a firearm.; Virginia maintains concealed handgun permit reciprocity with other States and recognizes some licenses from other States without a formal reciprocity agreement. The list of such states is maintained by the Virginia State Police.; Consuming an alcoholic beverage in ABC on-premises licensed restaurants and clubs, while carrying a concealed handgun, is prohibited. Openly carrying and consuming an alcoholic beverage is permitted. No person may carry a concealed handgun in a public place while under the influence of alcohol or illegal drugs.; § 18.2–308, which regulates concealed weapons, shall not apply to any person while in his own place of abode or the curtilage thereof.; Except as provided in subsection J1, being "under the influence", § 18.2–308 shall not apply to: Any person while in his own place of business; Any person who may lawfully possess a firearm and is carrying a handgun while in a personal, private motor vehicle or vessel and such handgun is secured in a container or compartment in the vehicle or vessel; Certain current and retired law-enforcement officers and certain State employees.

== History ==
Historians trace Virginia's first experience with gun control laws back to the First General Assembly of Jamestown on July 30, 1619. During this-five day meeting, Virginia officials voted in a gun control enactment that regulated the sale of firearms to Native Americans. In fact, each period of American history brought with it its own series of gun control regulations in Virginia. More recently, in the fallout of the Virginia Beach mass shooting in the summer of 2019, Governor Northam's Democrat controlled General Assembly have attempted to pass substantial new gun control legislation. In February 2020, a proposed assault weapons ban failed in the Virginia Senate. In April 2020, several new gun laws were enacted, including a requirement of background checks for private sales, a red flag law enabling Extreme Risk Protection Orders, a requirement to report lost or stolen guns, and the reinstating of a one-handgun-a-month law.

== Overview ==
The Constitution of Virginia protects the right of the people to keep and bear arms from government infringement. The Commonwealth of Virginia preempts local regulation of several aspects of firearms, though some local regulation is explicitly permitted. Virginia passed the Uniform Machine Gun Act, which was drafted by the National Conference of Commissioners on Uniform State Laws. The only firearms in Virginia that are prohibited are the Armsel Striker, also known as the Striker 12, similar shotguns, and any "plastic firearms." Firearms must contain at least 3.7 ounces of electromagnetically detectable metal in the barrel, slide, cylinder, frame or receiver, and when subjected to x-ray machines, generate an image that accurately depicts their shape. For example, Glock pistols which have polymer frames and metal slides and barrels are legal. There are no magazine capacity limitations, except that a concealed handgun permit (CHP) is required in order to carry magazines with more than 20 rounds in some urban, public areas. Prohibited places include courthouses, air carrier terminals, schools, child day centers, the Capitol and General Assembly buildings (as of early 2020), and churches, though some exceptions apply, including a 2011 Attorney General opinion that personal protection constitutes good and sufficient reason to carry at a church. George Mason University, James Madison University, Virginia Commonwealth University, and Virginia Polytechnic University (Virginia Tech) currently possess rules that prohibit firearms on school property.

A 2006 opinion issued by State Attorney General Robert F. McDonnell stated "... the governing boards of Virginia's public colleges and universities may not impose a general prohibition on the carrying of concealed weapons by permitted individuals ... Pursuant to specific grants of statutory authority, however, it is my opinion that colleges and universities may regulate the conduct of students and employees to prohibit them from carrying concealed weapons on campus."

In 2011, the Virginia Supreme Court found that the language used by George Mason University (GMU) to "... not impose a total ban of weapons on campus. Rather, the regulation is tailored, restricting weapons only in those places where people congregate and are most vulnerable – inside campus buildings and at campus events. Individuals may still carry or possess weapons on the open grounds of GMU, and in other places on campus not enumerated in the regulation."

There are age restrictions on the possession of firearms and some people are prohibited from possessing firearms due to certain criminal convictions. Licensed dealers must have the Virginia State Police conduct a background check prior to completing the sale of certain firearms. Persons who are not in the business of selling firearms, but make occasional, private sales, are not required to perform a background check before selling their firearms. Before July 1, 2012, a person could not purchase more than one handgun per 30-day period, though some exceptions applied; most significantly, holders of valid Concealed Handgun Permits (CHP) from Virginia were exempt from this restriction. The bill that repealed the "one-handgun-a-month law" was signed into law by Governor Bob McDonnell on February 28 of that year.

Open carry of a handgun without a permit is legal in Virginia at age 18, withstanding other applicable laws. Concealed carry of a handgun is allowed for persons who hold a valid CHP (concealed handgun permit), comply with certain restrictions, or who hold certain positions. Virginia shall issue a CHP to applicants 21 years of age or older, provided that they meet certain safety training requirements and do not have any disqualifying conditions under Title § 18.2-308.09 of the Virginia Code. Consuming an alcoholic beverage in ABC on-premises licensed restaurants and clubs, while carrying a concealed handgun, is prohibited; nor may any person carry a concealed handgun in a public place while under the influence of alcohol or illegal drugs (exceptions made for federal, state and local law enforcement). Any person permitted to carry a concealed firearm may not carry one in such manner in a public place while intoxicated. Possession of a firearm can compound the penalty for various other offenses, including illegal drug possession. Open carry while intoxicated is not addressed in the law and can presumed to be legal unless otherwise specified.

There are some restrictions on the use of weapons. Brandishing a firearm is punishable by up to a year in jail.

Some localities have adopted Second Amendment sanctuary resolutions.

In March 2020, the Virginia State Legislature passed 7 gun control bills. The bills included the following provisions:

- Criminal background checks are now required for all gun sales, excluding sales between family members and under certain other circumstances. Private party transfers between individuals who do not have a pre-existing relationship now require a background check conducted at a gun store.
- Handgun purchases are now capped at 1 every 30 days. However, people with licenses to carry concealed pistols are excluded from this limit.
- Virginia now has a red flag law. Judges can temporarily order the seizure of firearms from persons who are deemed a threat to themselves or others.
- Local governments have expanded power to ban firearms in certain sensitive areas, such as government buildings and public events.
- The penalty for allowing a child under 14 years of age to possess a firearms by leaving it unsecured in a reckless fashion was increased from a Class 3 misdemeanor to a Class 1 misdemeanor.
- People subject to "permanent protective orders" (domestic violence restraining orders with a maximum duration of 2 years) are required to surrender their firearms to local law enforcement, sell them to a licensed dealer, or give them to a person who is not prohibited from possessing firearms within 24 hours of being served notice of the protective order.
- Gun owners must report lost or stolen firearms to police within 48 hours.

== Concealed carry reciprocity ==
VA code 18.2-308.014 (reciprocity) states:

A valid concealed handgun or concealed weapon permit or license issued by another state shall authorize the holder of such permit or license who is at least 21 years of age to carry a concealed handgun in the Commonwealth, provided

(i) the issuing authority provides the means for instantaneous verification of the validity of all such permits or licenses issued within that state, accessible 24 hours a day if available;

(ii) the permit or license holder carries a photo identification issued by a government agency of any state or by the U.S. Department of Defense or U.S. Department of State and displays the permit or license and such identification upon demand by a law-enforcement officer; and

(iii) the permit or license holder has not previously had a Virginia concealed handgun permit revoked.

== See also ==
- Law of Virginia
