= Uniform Machine Gun Act =

The Uniform Machine Gun Act was drafted and published by the National Conference of Commissioners on Uniform State Laws. Maryland (1939), South Dakota (1939), Arkansas (1947), Montana (1947), Wisconsin (1947), Connecticut (1947), and Virginia (1950) adopted the act as law.
