= TGSCOM =

Online sporting goods store

TGSCOM, Inc.
- Type: Private
- Industry: Online retail; firearms; sporting goods
- Founded: 1999 (Arizona, U.S.)
- Founder: Eric Thompson
- Defunct: 2012-05-20
- Fate: Ceased operations following customer complaints and law-enforcement investigations
- Headquarters: Green Bay, Wisconsin, United States
- Area served: United States
- Key people: Eric Thompson (founder)
- Products: Firearms, sporting goods

TGSCOM, Inc. was an American online gun dealer based in Green Bay, Wisconsin which sold guns and sporting goods through more than 150 websites, including thegunsource.com and topglock.com. TGSCOM was founded in Arizona in 1999 by Eric Thompson, and was based in Tempe, Arizona until October 2006 when the operation was moved to Green Bay. TGSCOM is no longer in business as of May 20, 2012.

== Closure and controversies ==
In May 2012, TGSCOM ceased operations amid an investigation by the Green Bay Police Department following numerous customer complaints alleging that the company had billed clients for products that were never delivered. According to The Associated Press, law enforcement officials in nearly every U.S. state received similar complaints, and the Federal Bureau of Investigation also reviewed the case.

The Wisconsin Better Business Bureau reported nearly 200 complaints from customers in 44 states and issued an alert advising consumers to dispute payments through their credit card companies.

Federal records reviewed by the Green Bay Press-Gazette indicated that the Bureau of Alcohol, Tobacco, Firearms and Explosives cited TGSCOM for multiple violations in 2007 and 2009, including record-keeping deficiencies and sales that did not comply with federal waiting-period and age requirements.

Company founder Eric Thompson denied criminal wrongdoing and stated he was seeking investors to reopen the business. However, the company remained closed, and its assets later became part of a divorce proceeding involving Thompson and his wife.

== Media attention ==
TGSCOM sold weapons and/or accessories to George Sodini, the perpetrator of the 2009 LA Fitness shooting; Steven Kazmierczak, perpetrator of the 2008 Northern Illinois University shooting; and Seung-Hui Cho, the perpetrator of the 2007 Virginia Tech massacre. In August 2009, it employed 37 people; in 2007, at the time of the Virginia Tech shooting, the firm operated 50 websites and had 10 employees.
