= DCinside =

South Korean internet forum

- Website type: Internet forum
- Headquarters: 14 10 층 11 층, Teheran-ro 77-gil, Gangnam District, Seoul, South Korea
- Owner: DCinside Corp.
- Creator: Kim Yu-sik
- Website: http://dcinside.com (archived)
- Commercial: Yes (partly)
- Registration: Optional
- Launched: October 1999
- Current status: Active

DCinside (Note: Digital Camera Inside) (Korean: 디시인사이드), also known as DC, is a South Korean internet forum that was founded in 1999. It is a prominent online platform in the country, allowing users to engage in discussions on a diverse range of subjects with little moderation, such as entertainment, politics, and personal interests. The forum features user-generated content, including written posts, images, and videos, which are contributed by its active user base. DCinside has established itself as a significant hub for online discussion in South Korea. Some galleries of DCinside contain hateful content; It does not prevent users from making hate speech towards those with different race, country, ethnicity, region, age, disability, gender, sexual orientation, religion, occupation, and disease.

== Overview ==
Initially established as a community of interest dedicated to digital cameras and photography in October 1999, it soon expanded continuously by the propagation of additional image boards. The vestige lies on the name (short for Digital Camera), and the fact that the term gallery refers to each imageboard.

== History ==
The website was initially populated by early adopters of electronic devices, and was incorporated in 2000.

By 2006, it had 500 active boards, and Kim anticipated the count to multiply to over 1000 by the latter half of 2007. In 2009, it stopped providing information about digital cameras since it had transformed into a general imageboard website.

In 2013, it stopped using the remodeled version of Zeroboard, a popular Korean free-to-use script for bulletin board systems. Zeroboard was known to have security vulnerabilities and bandwidth issues, which many users expressed frustration about as early as 2006.

In 2015, its own Wiki was created. In 2016, a new update gave users the ability to request a new imageboard subject. These imageboards, called minor galleries, are separate from previous galleries.

== Galleries ==
The early galleries were for uploading user-created camera pictures, which led to a rule requiring an image be uploaded for each post. This rule is no longer in effect.

Gallery topics range from generic categories such as politics, science, wiki, sports and video games, to particular subjects such as those devoted to individual celebrities and K-pop stars. New galleries are created if the new topic is acknowledged and deemed appropriate by the site administrator.

=== Minor galleries ===
New minor galleries are created upon user request. The request message should explain the gallery topic, which should not be inappropriate, and should not overlap with existing galleries. Highly active minor galleries can be promoted into main galleries by administrators. In this case, administrators obtain the right to manage the galleries.

=== Administrators and managers ===
Galleries are controlled by site administrators, while minor galleries are controlled by dedicated user accounts, called managers, or more frequently ju-ttag (주딱; lit. 'orange badge'), due to the fact that their usernames come with an orange badge. Manager roles are first assigned to the user who requested creation of that gallery, and the role can be handed over to other users. Sub-managers can be appointed by managers and get a blue badge, leading them to be called pa-ttag (파딱; lit. 'blue badge').

=== Hit gallery ===
Site administrators choose posts from among the whole website to re-upload to the Hit gallery. There are no specific standards for choosing posts, but they are generally fun, useful posts. The user who created the original post can request it be deleted from the Hit gallery.

== Culture ==
The culture varies between different galleries. One shared trait is that users call themselves x-bung-i (x-붕이), where x is the gallery name's first syllable.

=== Anonymity ===
Users have the option to be anonymous, which led to the forum's atmosphere being different from other major Korean forums.

Since 2007, you can choose to register, log-in and use your own account. Before that, it was a fully anonymous forum.

The anonymity led users to communicate casually, expressively, and with insults and abuses.

=== Parody and neologisms ===
The forum is a main source of popular jokes, buzzwords, and neologisms in South Korea. Parodies, satires and slang based on controversial social or political phenomena and public figures are shared, and are quickly spread to other online communities and eventually to news, advertisements and everyday life. Some popular slang is as follows:

- ing-yeo (잉여; lit. 'surplus'), meaning a person who is incompetent and useless in society; it was used widely pre-2010.
- 헬조선; lit. 'Hell Joseon', which was generated in the History gallery, which was notorious for anti-Koreanism as of 2015. The word roughly means living in Korea is harsh and hopeless.

=== As an alternative mass media ===
Criticism of Hwang Woo-Suk was led by the Science gallery along with the Biological Research Information Center gallery in 2005. The Stock gallery found video evidence for the trial of Kim Ki-Choon, a central figure of the 2016 South Korean political scandal. The video was referenced in the parliamentary audit by congresswoman Park Young-sun.

=== Politics ===
In the early 2000s, the site was described to be quite progressive, but starting in 2009, conservative users began to speak out and take the lead. Kim Yu-sik, the founder of DC, explained, “In the past, online sites were mainly progressive domains, but after the mad cow disease incident, the sinking of the Cheonan warship and the shelling of Yeonpyeong Island in 2010, communities that voiced conservative opinions began to grow." However, with the creation of Ilbe Storage, far-right users began to leave, making it hard to specify its political leanings.

Because there are so many galleries and each gallery has a different history and major themes, there are also left-wing and neutral galleries, so it is hard to say that there is a representative specific political tendency of all DC Inside galleries.

Some galleries were also accused of misogyny, and the Baseball gallery has been called out for insults against women and controversial views on today's equality and for its "secondary abuse" toward high school teachers reporting sexual assaults.

== Incidents and controversy ==
=== Formation of Megalia ===
The MERS gallery (short for Middle East respiratory syndrome outbreak) was created in the spring of 2015, and became a place for bashing two women who were falsely accused of contracting MERS, refusing quarantine and going shopping in Hong Kong. They were bashed as "kimchi women" (김치녀; gimchi-nyeo), a misogynist term for women who only have shopping on their minds.

As this continued, an influx of feminists started using reactionary terms, coining gimchi-nam (김치남; lit. 'kimchi man'), a reclaimed term which mocks Korean men. DC Inside intervened by instituting a policy which forbade the usage of gimchi-nam. A portion of its users regarded the measure as discriminatory, (Note: One news source reports, "Compared to DC Inside's track record thus far of never handing out any sanctions whatsoever against seriously misogynic statements, this [measure] was hard to comprehend".) which eventually led to the creation of a feminist website, Megalia.

=== Lee Kun-hee death rumors ===
On 4 July 2016, police raided DC Inside and Ilbe Storage, which spread rumors of Samsung Group Chairman Lee Kun-hee's death in an apparent bid to boost stock prices.

== See also ==
- Alt-lite
- Ilbe Storehouse – a more hardline right-wing off-shoot forum of DC Inside
