= Virginia Tech Police Department =

Coordinates: 37.2188°N 80.4155°W

Virginia Tech Police
- Motto: Ut Prosim (that I may serve)

Agency overview
- Formed: 1945

Jurisdictional structure
- Legal jurisdiction: Virginia Polytechnic Institute and State University

Operational structure
- Sworn members: 58
- Agency executive: William "Mac" Babb, Chief
- Specialty units: Investigative Division, Community Outreach Unit, K9 Unit, Emergency Response Team

Website
- police.vt.edu

The Virginia Tech Police Department (VTPD) is a nationally accredited police department with jurisdiction over Virginia Tech. The departments original accreditation with CALEA was awarded on November 18, 1995 and the department has continued with re-accreditation. In November 2015, the department met "gold standard" and also won CALEA's "Accreditation with Excellence" award.

The department is located at 330 Sterrett Drive, building 0523, in the Public Safety Building located on campus behind Lane Stadium.

The department has 58 full-time sworn officers who are complemented in their duties by 15 civilian staff and numerous security personnel. In 2016, VTPD joined the New River Valley Emergency Communications Regional Authority with all the other police, sheriff, fire and rescue agencies in Montgomery County. The department's investigations unit consists of a detective lieutenant, a detective sergeant and three detectives. There is also one detective assigned to the FBI Joint Terrorism Task Force. The force is headed by Chief Mac Babb.

VTPD officers have jurisdiction and legal authority on all university-owned and/or leased property and work closely and share jurisdiction with the Blacksburg Police Department, the Montgomery County Sheriff's Department and other law enforcement agencies.

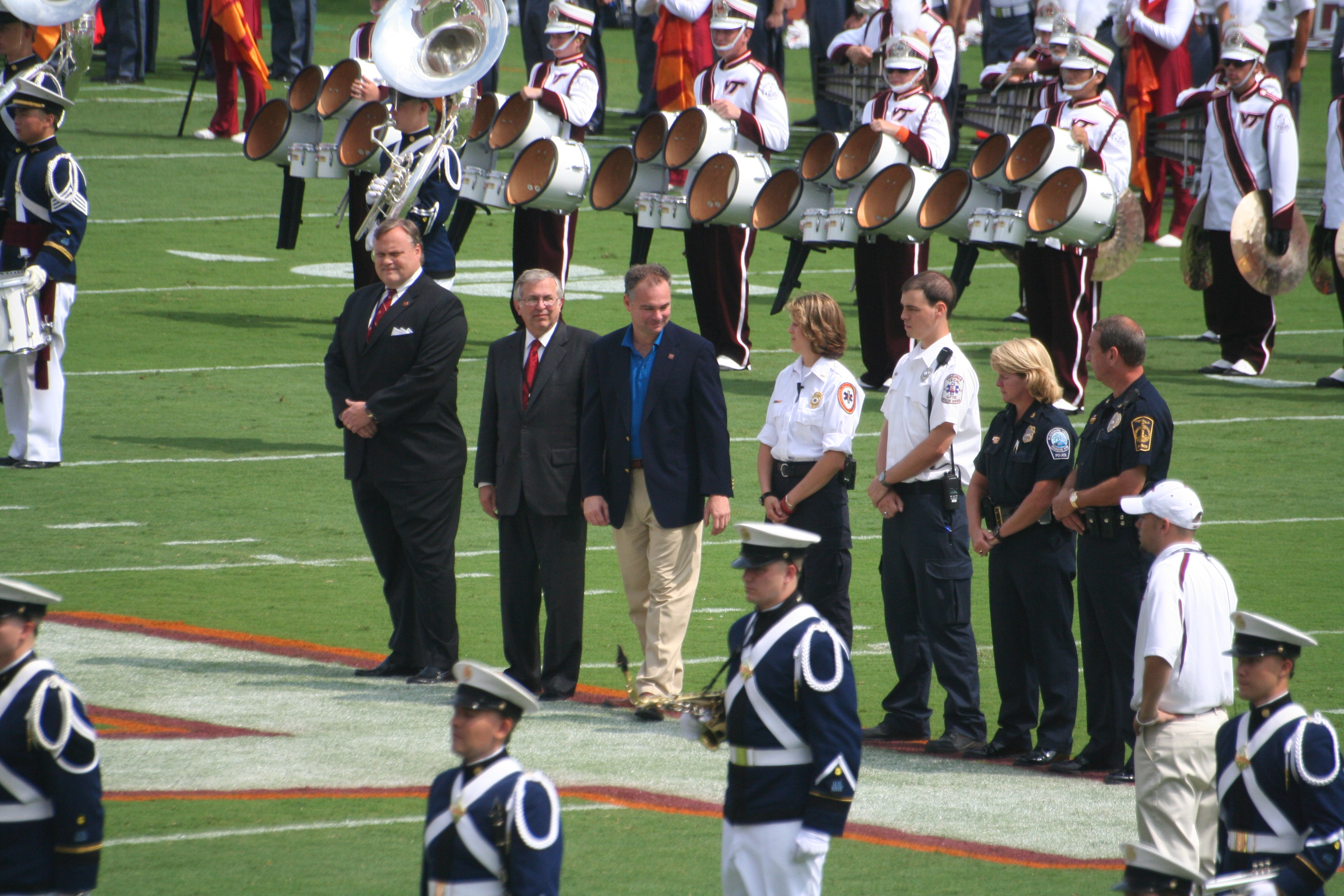
Virginia Tech President Charles W. Steger and Virginia governor Tim Kaine thank Virginia Tech Police Chief Wendell Flinchum and the Virginia Tech first responders for their work during the Virginia Tech massacre.

The force came to world attention in April 2007, following the Virginia Tech shooting.

== Duties ==
Beyond general law enforcement, the department provides services including Rape Aggression Defense classes, the Student's Police Academy and the Campus Citizen's Emergency Response team.

The department also has a three officer K9 unit.

The department is responsible for the well being of more than 50,000 students, employees, and visitors at Virginia Tech, 24 hours a day and also oversees the Virginia Tech Rescue Squad which is the known oldest all volunteer collegiate rescue squad in the country.

The Residence Life Resource Officer (RLRO) Program began in 2011 in partnership with the Housing and Residence Life Division of Student Affairs at Virginia Tech. This collaborative public safety initiative was designed to complement the existing community outreach "Adopt a Hall Program", which has been in effect since the fall of 2001. In addition to having every patrol officer assigned a residence hall as part of the Adopt a Hall program, the Residence Life Resource Officer Program has 3 officer positions that work with students in "community engagement activities."

VTPD, in collaboration with the One Love Foundation, offers programs to raise awareness about domestic violence.

Also, the Virginia Tech Police Department sponsors a nighttime safety escort service called "Safe Ride." This service is available to all students, faculty, staff, and visitors to the university. Safe Ride operates from dusk until dawn.

In addition, the Virginia Criminal Justice Services Board has designated Virginia Tech as a "Crime Prevention Campus." Virginia Tech is the fourth university in the commonwealth to receive the distinction in recognition of exemplary crime prevention services and initiatives.

== Chiefs ==
=== Chief Flinchum (retired) ===
Wendell Flinchum is the former chief of the department and retired in 2014. He is a native of Blacksburg and had spent his entire career with the Virginia Tech police beginning part-time in 1983 while a student at Virginia Tech. He has worked as a safety escort, a dispatcher, a patrol officer and a detective. He joined the department full-time in 1985. He also trained at the FBI National Academy. Flinchum was named chief over 90 candidates.

=== Chief Foust ===
Kevin Foust was named Chief of Police and Director of Campus Security at Virginia Tech in August 2014, a position he held on an interim basis since February 2014. Foust joined the Virginia Tech Police Department in 2011 as the deputy chief of police and assistant director of security after a 24-year career with the FBI. As deputy chief and assistant director of security, Foust managed security operations for the university's facilities across Virginia and overseas. In addition, he led the police department's administrative division, which included communications, community outreach, security, and the Safe Ride program. Foust began his career at the FBI in 1987. He served in several capacities including unit chief of the Osama bin Laden Unit in the Counter-terrorism Division. He was the supervisory senior resident agent for Southwest Virginia prior to joining the university. Foust received two bachelor's degrees from Grove City College. On October 1, 2019, Foust was named to a newly created position of Associate Vice President of Safety and Security.

=== Chief Babb ===
William "Mac" Babb was named Chief of Police and Director of Security on October 1, 2019. Babb, formerly with the Roanoke Police Department, was named Deputy Chief of Police and Assistant Director of Security at Virginia Tech in July 2015 where he assisted in developing and implementing a security strategy and coordinating the security services for all Virginia Tech campuses and programs, including those overseas. In 1990, Babb began his career at the Roanoke Police Department as a police officer. He was promoted to sergeant in 1999 and lieutenant in 2006. During his career, Babb managed the canine unit, served as a tactical response team commander, directed the police academy, and completed his career supervising the Investigations Bureau. He has received numerous awards over his career including the Commonwealth Valor Award and the Lifesaving Award from the Virginia Association of Chiefs of Police. Babb received a bachelor’s degree from Roanoke College and a master’s degree from American Military University. Babb is a graduate of the National Criminal Justice Command College.

== See also ==
- William & Mary Police Department
