= Walther P22 =

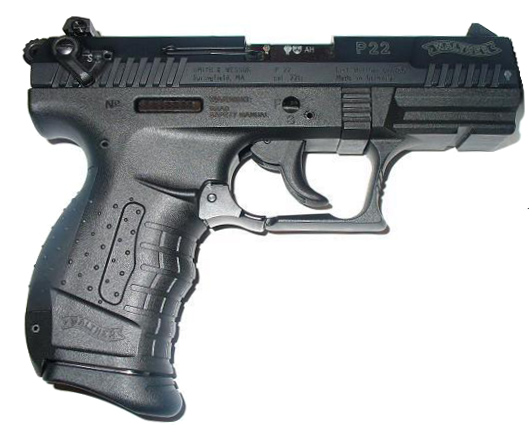
- Type: Semi-automatic pistol
- Place of origin: Germany

Production history
- Manufacturer: Carl Walther GmbH
- Produced: 2002–present

Specifications
- Length: 159 mm
- Barrel length: 87 mm
- Width: 29 mm
- Height: 114 mm
- Cartridge: .22 Long Rifle
- Caliber: 5.59 mm
- Action: Blowback
- Muzzle velocity: 290 m/s
- Effective firing range: 30-50 meters
- Feed system: 10-round detachable box magazine
- Sights: Adjustable open sights

The Walther P22 is a semi-automatic pistol chambered for .22 Long Rifle (5.59 mm Caliber) rimfire ammunition. Manufactured by Carl Walther GmbH Sportwaffen, it was introduced in 2002 and has become very popular among shooting sports. It is distributed by the American gun company Walther America, associated with Smith & Wesson.

== Operation ==
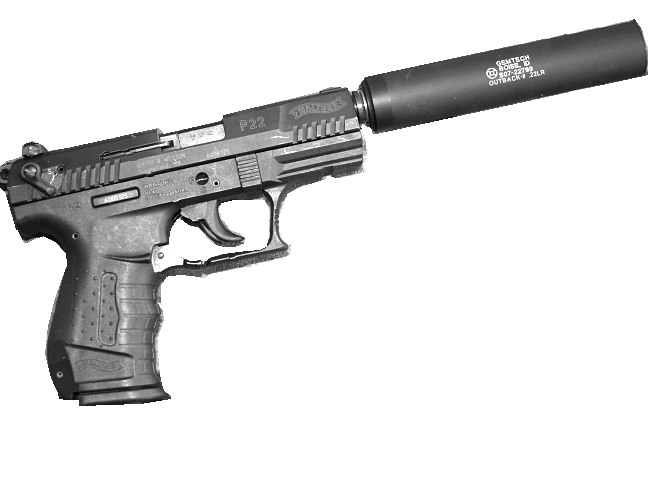
The P22 with a Gemtech suppressor

The P22 may be fired double action at about 11 pounds-force (49 N), and operates as a single action with slightly more than 4 pounds-force (18 N). The P22 operates by blowback energy from the motion of the cartridge case as it is pushed to the rear by expanding gas created by the ignition of the propellant charge. The action will not open until the projectile has left the barrel and the pressures have dropped to safe levels. The gun will not cycle efficiently unless high velocity .22 (5.59 mm) rounds are used.

== Users ==
- Germany
- United States
- Colombia
- Bangladesh

== See also ==
- Walther P99
- Walther PK380
- Walther SP22
- Ruger SR22
- SIG Sauer P322

== Sources ==
- Chinn, George M. (1955). The Machine Gun, Volume IV: Design Analysis of Automatic Firing Mechanisms and Related Components. Washington, D.C.: Bureau of Ordnance, Department of the Navy.
