= SEPA =

SEPA may refer to:

== Places ==
- Sepa, Tartu County, Estonia
- Sepa, Saaremaa Parish, Estonia
- Sepa, Pihtla Parish, Estonia
- Sepa, a lake in 108 Mile Ranch, British Columbia, Canada

== Businesses and organisations ==
- Scottish Environment Protection Agency, an environmental regulator
- Seton Company, Inc., an American automotive leather company
- Single Euro Payments Area, a payment-integration initiative of the European Union
- State Environmental Protection Administration, former name of Ministry of Ecology and Environment in China

== Other uses ==
- Sepa (god), an Ancient Egyptian deity
- Sepa (priest), an Ancient Egyptian, who lived during Third dynasty
- Sepa (skipper), a genus of butterflies
- Sepa language (disambiguation), several uses

== See also ==
- CEPA (disambiguation)
- CIPA (disambiguation)
