= Closer Economic Partnership Arrangement =

Closer Economic Partnership Arrangement (CEPA, simplified Chinese: 更紧密经贸关系; traditional Chinese: 更緊密經貿關係 Hanyu Pinyin: Gēng Jǐnmì Jīngmào Guānxì) are economic and trade agreement between the separate customs territories within the People's Republic of China.

The Closer Economic Partnership Arrangements which are in effect:

- Mainland and Hong Kong Closer Economic Partnership Arrangement (Chinese: 內地與香港關於建立更緊密經貿關係的安排)
- Mainland and Macau Closer Economic Partnership Arrangement (Chinese: 內地與澳門關於建立更緊密經貿關係的安排, Portuguese: Acordo de Estreitamento das Relações Económicas e Comerciais entre o Continente Chinês e Macau)

== See also ==
- Economic Cooperation Framework Agreement, economic agreement between the PRC Government and the ROC Government
