= Sipa (disambiguation) =

Sipa is a Philippines national and traditional native sport.

Sipa or SIPA may also refer to:

- Sipa, Estonia, a village
- Șipa, a tributary of the Prahova river in Romania
- Sipa Press, a French photo agency
- School of International and Public Affairs, Columbia University, at Columbia University, US
- Southern Interscholastic Press Association, a nonprofit organization at the University of South Carolina, US
- Société Industrielle pour l'Aéronautique, a defunct French aircraft maker
- State Investigation and Protection Agency, a law enforcement agency in Bosnia and Herzegovina
- Securities Investor Protection Act, United States federal legislation from 1970
- Sistema de Informação para o Património Arquitectónico ('Architectural Heritage Information System'), of the Direção-Geral do Património Cultural in Portugal

== See also ==
- CIPA (disambiguation)
