= ECFA =

ECFA may refer to:

- Economic Cooperation Framework Agreement, agreement between Mainland China and Taiwan
- Evangelical Council for Financial Accountability, accrediting association for evangelical Christian organizations
