= Westfield High School (Virginia) =

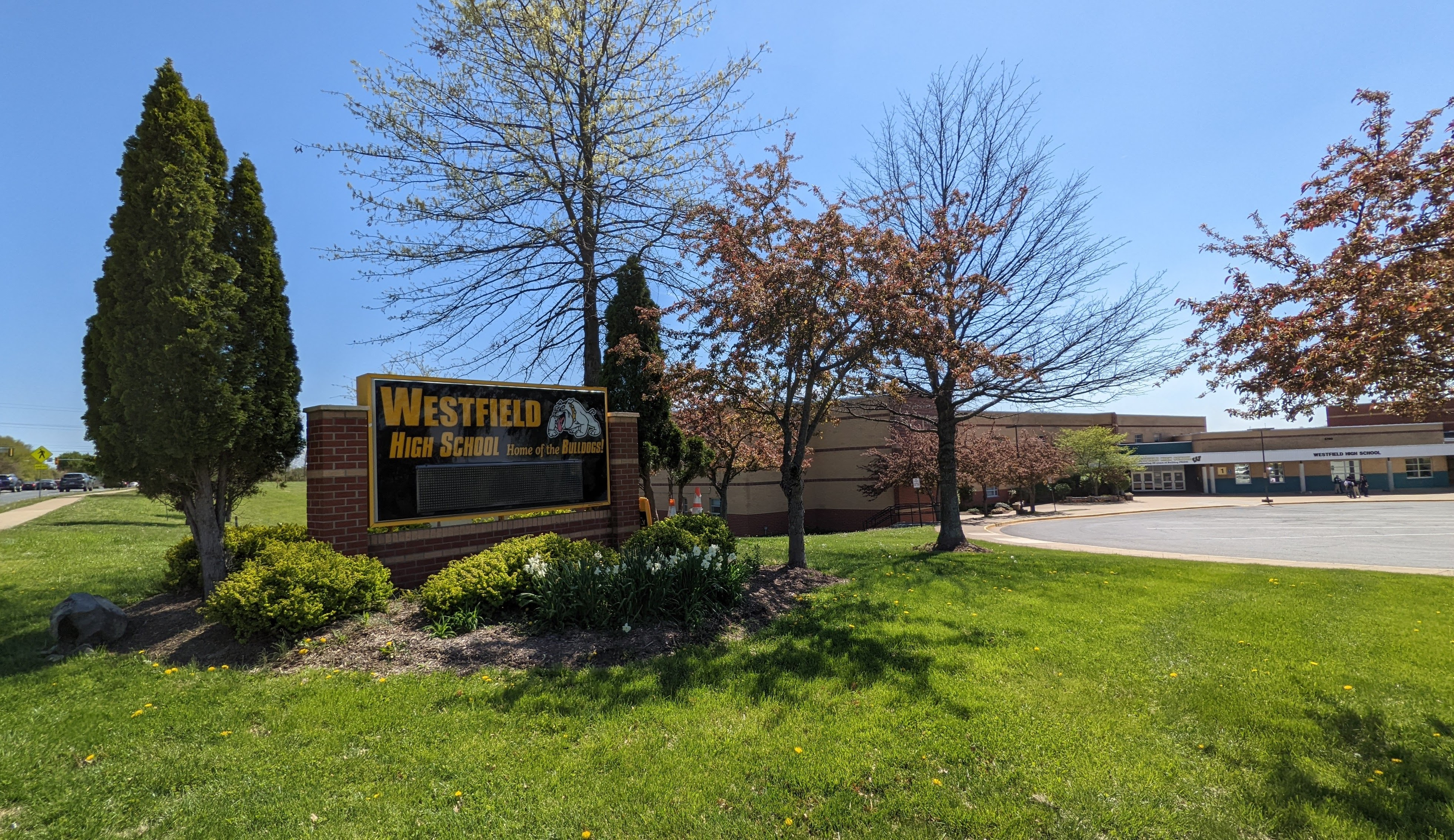

Location
- 4700 Stonecroft Boulevard; Chantilly, Virginia 20151; United States; 38°53′07″N 77°27′51″W

Information
- School type: Public, high school
- Motto: United in Excellence, Committed to Achievement
- Founded: 2000; 26 years ago
- School district: Fairfax County Public Schools
- Principal: Meredith Norris
- Teaching staff: 213.39 (FTE)
- Grades: 9–12
- Enrollment: 2,737 (2024-2025)
- Student to teacher ratio: 12.83∶1
- Campus: Suburban
- Campus size: 159 acres (0.248 sq mi)
- Colors: Black, gold and white
- Athletics conference: Concorde District VHSL Class 6 - Region D
- Mascot: Bulldog
- Rival: Centreville Wildcats; Chantilly Chargers; Oakton Cougars
- Newspaper: The Watchdog
- Feeder schools: Ormond Stone, Rachel Carson and Rocky Run middle schools
- Website: westfieldhs.fcps.edu

Westfield High School is a public high school in unincorporated Fairfax County, Virginia, United States, west of the Chantilly CDP. Opened in 2000, Westfield's main building has the same layout as South County High School (Fairfax County, Virginia). At 3,260 students, it is one of the largest four-year high schools in the Commonwealth of Virginia.

== Governace ==
It is a part of Fairfax County Public Schools (FCPS), serving students from the communities including Chantilly and Centreville as well as areas with Herndon addresses in grades 9–12. It is the head of the Westfield High School Pyramid in Cluster VIII.

== History ==
Westfield was first conceived to help deal with the extensive overcrowding at adjacent schools, primarily Centreville and Chantilly high schools. Plans for Westfield High school originated in 1995 when it was conceived as West County High School. Westfield's colors and mascot were chosen by community members in the months before its grand opening in 2000. By 2005, Westfield had grown so large that it had become one of the largest four-year high schools in Virginia. An additional wing was planned to help deal with the overcrowding, and was completed in summer of 2006.

=== Regulation 1320.1 ===
"Assembly topics should relate to the general goals of the instructional program and address areas of special significance. Assemblies that promote a particular enterprise or whose main purpose is entertainment should not be scheduled during the school day. Time for assemblies should be made available through schedule modifications that cause the least disruption to the instructional program."

"Although pep rallies may contribute to school spirit, they should not be allowed to interfere with the instructional program. Pep rallies should be scheduled before or after school, with the period after school being the preferred time."

— Fairfax County Public Schools Regulation 1320.1

Regulation 1320.1 (also known as Guidelines for Restricting Interruptions to Instructional Time—Middle and High Schools) was implemented on April 21, 2004, as an FCPS directive. It was adopted by the county school board to ensure that instructional time in middle and high schools meet limits set by the Virginia Department of Education. The directive limited events such as assemblies and pep rallies by categorizing them as after-school events, with the exception of homecoming pep rallies.

Local radio station DC101's Elliot in the Morning show held a contest in fall 2004 for area high school students whose winners were to host alternative rock band Taking Back Sunday at their school. Westfield students won this contest, whose result was approved by former principal Mike Campbell with the concert date set for Tuesday, November 16. However, students soon learned that a clause in Regulation 1320.1 prohibiting assemblies by business-sponsored groups prevented plans for the concert from being carried out. On Monday, November 15, students began a Taking Back Tuesday movement advocating a schoolwide skip day on the day of the cancelled concert, but it dissolved after Campbell's schoolwide address that afternoon.

Following the incident, students and parents appealed to the school board to return pep rallies to the instructional period and to reconsider the regulation. In a review by the Parent Teacher Student Association, it was found that the school was only allowed one pep rally during the year, adding to the confusion of the situation. In February 2005, FCPS clarified its policy stating that the regulation on pep rallies was not meant to limit school spirit, but the concert remained cancelled.

=== Violence controversies ===
Westfield received media attention in the mid-2000s because of two murders perpetrated by alumni which occurred within one year.

Michael Kennedy, who suffered from schizophrenia, shot and killed Master Police Officer Michael Garbarino and Detective Vicky Armel of the Fairfax County Police Department on May 8, 2006, in an attack on the Sully District Police Station, less than one-half mile from Westfield. On April 5, 2007, Kennedy's father was indicted by a federal grand jury on two counts of drug possession and six counts of weapons charges. The indictment mentioned charges that Kennedy's father illegally possessed marijuana, which made it illegal for him to possess the weapons or ammunition used by Kennedy in the police station attack.

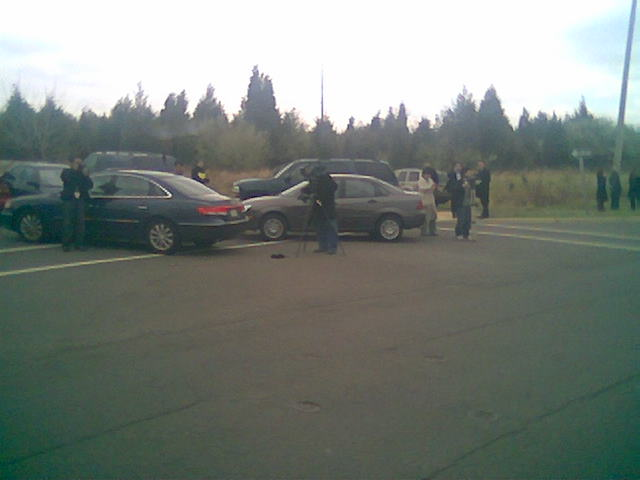
Reporters gathered outside school grounds after police reported the day following the Virginia Tech massacre that gunman Seung-Hui Cho had graduated from Westfield.

The 2007 Virginia Tech massacre committed by gunman Seung-Hui Cho, an alumnus of Westfield High School, killed thirty-two people, including two Westfield alumnae, Erin Peterson and Reema Samaha. There is no evidence that Cho singled either out during the attack or even knew them. Although Cho's motivation for the shooting is unknown, his suicide note mentioned vague references to his emotional turmoil. While a few students recall instances of Cho being teased and mocked at Westfield, most left him alone and were not aware of his anger. It is unknown if or how much his experience at Westfield contributed to his mental breakdown. Journalists from the international media arrived at Westfield the day Cho's identity was announced, prompting a ban on reporters at six athletic games due "the impact... on school children, academics and other important activities." Criticism of the school's learning environment also prompted students and alumni to rally against the media's biased reporting by emphasizing their many achievements. As a way to honor the two deceased alumnae, the Erin Peterson Fund and Reema J. Samaha Memorial Scholarship Fund were established with the school's support to award scholarships for graduating seniors who best exemplify their personalities.

=== Drug incidents ===
In 2008, incidents involving Westfield alumni purchasing and distributing heroin made local headlines. The first was the death of 19-year-old Alicia Lannes, a graduate of Westfield in 2007, as a result of heroin overdose, which helped spark a federal investigation on heroin and other hard drugs and traffickers in the area.

The second incident occurred on November 20, when ten young adults and teenagers (six of them being Westfield High School alumni, and others attending Virginia Commonwealth University) were arrested as part of the shutdown of a major heroin ring responsible for the deaths of multiple students from Westfield and other local high schools.

It is believed that the death of multiple students (including Alicia Lannes) and the heroin ring were linked.

== Campus ==
Westfield's main structure was designed by Swirnow Structures LLC. The same design was later used for the construction of South County Secondary School in the southern part of Fairfax County, but former Westfield principal Dale Rumberger denied claims of establishing a "mini-Westfield" despite becoming the principal at South County after leaving Westfield in 2004.

The school campus occupies 159 acres (0.64 km^{2}) and is composed of the main building (the "school"), the sports complex including all fields and the parking lots.

The main building currently comprises two levels, with seven main hallways for the classrooms on each level. The heart of the school is the library and media center which currently holds over 21,000 books with room for an additional 4,000. There are over 40 computer stations for student use in the library.

The Westfield Sports Complex includes the American football stadium; a baseball field; a softball field; six tennis courts; a track which encircles a field for track and field, soccer, and lacrosse; and multiple practice fields. Adjacent to the complex is the Cub Run RECenter, home to Westfield's swim and dive team, although it is not part of the school.

=== Overcrowding ===
In the mid-2000s, Westfield was often criticized as being grossly overcrowded. The building design provided for a capacity of 2,500 students, a number that was reached in its third year of opening. When the school opened, the unincorporated communities of Centreville and Chantilly experienced a population and real estate boom that was not projected by the county. By the 2004–2005 academic year, the school was over its capacity by 25 percent, and 26 trailers filled the parking lot originally designated for faculty and staff along with additional ground space surrounding the school's main building.

In April 2003, FCPS proposed a bond referendum for the construction of a 24-room addition to Westfield's main building to alleviate the rapid growth of the student population. The bond referendum provided for the construction of the new addition at a cost of $8.7 million. The bond was approved in November of the same year, and construction for the massive new wing began in summer of 2005. Construction was completed in time for the 2006–2007 school year, increasing capacity to 3,100. It has two levels and a basement. It is called the R-hallway.

Some former feeder communities of Westfield were re-zoned to the attendance boundary of South Lakes High School, located in the unincorporated community of Reston. Due to this boundary adjustment, Westfield's enrollment has declined and is currently considered under capacity, with a 2013–2014 student membership of 2,750.

=== Community use ===
Northern Virginia's New Life Christian Church held services at Westfield after relocating its main campus from Stone Middle School before building and moving to the Zone. Three services are held each Sunday with an attendance of 1,500.

In 2003, the Work Awareness and Transition (WAT) class opened a branch of the Apple Federal Credit Union for students and faculty. The branch is operated by student tellers in WAT.

Hope Chinese School, a Chinese language school in the Washington area, designated Westfield as the site of its Chantilly campus in fall 2006. Chinese language and cultural elective classes are held on Sunday afternoons in the new building addition.

The local area pro women's softball team Washington Glory called the Westfield Sports Complex home for its 2008 season. The Glory played the 2007 season at George Mason University's softball complex, which ias undergoing a renovation during the 2008 season. The stadium ha increased seating for not only the Glory but also for the Virginia State Softball Championships, which will also be hosted at the site along with baseball, lacrosse, soccer and track.

== Curriculum ==
Westfield's faculty is divided into 10 departments: English, ESOL (English for speakers of other languages), Fine and Performing Arts, Foreign Language, Health and Physical Education, Mathematics, Career and Technical Education (CTE), Science, Social Studies, and Special Education.

As one of 16 Fairfax County high schools that offer the Advanced Placement (AP) Program, Westfield offered 22 of the 32 AP courses that are offered by the College Board as of the 2007–2008 school year. (The other eight high schools are designated for the International Baccalaureate Program.) The curriculum also offers Honors courses to prepare students for the rigorous workload associated with AP courses.

Fairfax County's academy system also allows Westfield students to take alternate classes at Chantilly, Edison, Fairfax, Marshall, and West Potomac high schools with transportation provided.

Westfield's Aerospace Science class is the only one of its kind in FCPS, and its television production Lab is the most advanced of any FCPS school. Westfield also offers among the highest number of business-related, technology, and computer classes for any FCPS school, including its notable cooperative education program offered by the Professional and Technical Studies department. The photography and computer graphics labs are among the most complete and advanced in FCPS and provide an extensive array of equipment available for student use. The music technology lab is designed for music theory, and has special software for composing music.

The Foreign Language department offers seven languages for students to study: American Sign Language, French, German, Japanese, Korean, Latin, and Spanish.

Human Anatomy and Physiology is an additional course offered by this school to science students who are interested in pursuing a career in the medical field and would like a more in-depth coverage on human systems than AP Biology.

Westfield's English department provides a number of unique elective courses such as forensics and debate, film study, and a course on William Shakespeare. The Fine and Performing Arts department produced a news program which broadcasts information and upcoming events at or involving Westfield over the school's televisions on a daily basis.

== Extracurricular activities ==
Portrait of the WHS Bulldog

Westfield has teams in 19 different sports: baseball, basketball, cheerleading, crew, cross country/track and field, dance team, field hockey, American football, golf, gymnastics, ice hockey, lacrosse, soccer, softball, swim and dive, tennis, volleyball and wrestling.

Due to Westfield's large enrollment, the school is categorized 6A-class, as defined by the Virginia High School League. Beginning with the 2017–18 academic year, it belongs to the Concorde District within Region D.

=== Athletics ===
The boys' outdoor track and field team earned its first Virginia AAA state title in 2004.

Westfield's track Team also won regionals indoor season of 2007 and outdoor season of 2007.

=== American football ===
The school football team have made five state championship appearances, winning all, and have appeared in 10 regional championship games since 2003. They have also clinched the Concorde District five times in six years, from 2011 to 2016, with the lone exception in 2013. The Bulldogs have ended three seasons with perfect records.

In 2003, the school completed a 14–0 season after winning the northern region championship over rival Robinson 28–7, then winning against the defending state champion C.D. Hylton 24–14 in the state semi-finals before beating Landstown 35–14 in the VHSL 6A State Championship game, winning them their first state championship in school history.

In 2006, the Bulldogs advanced to the northern region championship game before falling to rival Chantilly 26–21 in the waning moments. Under the guidance of future NFL quarterback Mike Glennon, Westfield achieved another perfect season, including a 28–16 win over the Chantilly Chargers and a shutout of rival Centreville 33–0 in the regular season finale. In the playoffs, the Bulldogs won three regional playoff games by a combined margin of 139-54 en route to their second region championship, including a 58–34 defeat of the West Springfield Spartans. Once in the state tournament, the Bulldogs faced the Oscar Smith Tigers in the state semi-finals. The Bulldogs prevailed 24–21, setting up a matchup against the Woodbridge Vikings. In Scott Stadium at the University of Virginia, the Bulldogs won their second state title in school history.

The Bulldogs finished the 2011 season with a 10–0 perfect regular season record, winning their first two playoff games before ultimately falling to rival Centreville 27–24 in the regional championship due to a blocked field goal. The Bulldogs ended the season at 12–1.

In 2012, the team once again completed a perfect regular season record, including a 40–21 revenge win over Centreville. The Bulldogs won two playoff games before falling to rival Oakton High School in the region title game 23–16, ending their season at 12–1.

In 2013, Westfield finished second in the Concorde district behind rival Centreville with an 8–2 record, winning three playoff games, including a 19–16 upset over previously undefeated Lake Braddock, before reaching their third straight regional final and second in three years against the Centreville Wildcats. However, in the regional final, they were defeated by the eventual state champion Wildcats 35–14. The Bulldogs finished the season 11–3.

In 2014, Westfield completed a 9–1 regular season. They advanced to the region championship for the fourth straight year, but lost again to Centreville 21–17, ending their season at 12–2.

In the 2015 season, Westfield finished with a 9–1 regular season yet again, including a 20–12 win over Centreville and advancing far in the playoffs. After defeating Washington-Lee 44–20, South Lakes 24–13, and Lake Braddock 31–7, Westfield faced South County for the region championship, with the Bulldogs taking the title with a 40–8 win over the Stallions. The win propelled the team to the VHSL 6A State Championship against the Oscar Smith Tigers, marking only the second time in history that the two schools met. That game went into overtime tied at 28, with Westfield winning their third state championship with a 49–42 win in overtime. The season ended 14–1.

In 2016, Westfield began the season with a 45–0 win over Washington-Lee High School as the defending state champions. However, over the course of the season, the Bulldogs lost to two 5A powerhouses (Stone Bridge 34–16 and Briar Woods 35–34). The Bulldogs finished 8–2 in the regular season. With their 49–21 win over Chantilly in the regular season finale, the Bulldogs clinched their fifth district title in six years. They won their first round playoff game against W.T. Woodson 45–7, and defeated South County 20–3 in round 2. The Bulldogs then defeated James Madison High School in the 6A North Region semi-finals 31–13, and for the 6th consecutive season competed in the 6A North Region Championship/VHSL 6A State semi-finals. The Bulldogs then defeated the South Lakes Seahawks 42–12 to advance to their second straight state title game. At Armstrong Stadium in Hampton, Westfield again outlasted Oscar Smith 34–28 in double overtime to win their fourth straight championship and second straight title. The win finished the season at 13–2. Westfield is the first team to win back-to-back state championships in football since CD Hylton in 1998 and 1999.

In 2017, the Bulldogs started the season 3–0, including a 28–27 victory over South County. They finished the regular season 10–0, and won their 5th state title and third in a row over Oscar Smith to finish 15–0 in the season.

In 2018, the team again finished the regular season undefeated and won their fourth straight regional championship. The season ended a week later with a loss to Freedom 35–28 in the state semi-finals, ending a long winning streak and denying them their fourth straight championship.

=== Basketball ===
The boys' basketball team first major success was the Northern Region championship in 2015. The Bulldogs went on to play in the state championship, where they fell short to the Colonial Forge Eagles 47–46. The team finished 27–2. In 2016, the team reached the state final yet again and faced the Oscar Smith Tigers for the second time in a state championship game that year, as the football team won states against the Tigers back in the fall. Westfield prevailed with a 74–56 victory and captured the first state title for basketball in school history. The 2016 team finished 26–3. Westfield would win another state title in boys' basketball 10 years later in 2026 when Westfield defeated Landstown to finish the season 30-1.

=== Field hockey ===
The girls' field hockey team captured the 2013 and the 2017 VHSL State title both with a 2–1 upset over 2 times defending champions First Colonial. The games were played at the Virginia Beach sports complex. The 2017 team finished 24–0.

=== Wrestling ===
The school wrestling team have won eight district championships (2004–2009, 2011–2012), five Northern Region titles (2008–2010, 2012, 2020) and placing frequently in the top ten at the State Tournament. Westfield wrestling has had at least one state champion wrestler for 10 consecutive years (2007–2016).

=== Other sports ===
In 2004, the varsity baseball team reached the state championship final. The boys' soccer team won the district and regional titles in 2005, overall becoming state semifinalists.

The girls' lacrosse team won the 2014 VHSL 6A State championship over rival Oakton High School 13–11 and captured their first state championship. The game was played at Lake Braddock Secondary School.

=== Honors ===
Football state championship games
Year	Winning team		Losing team		Location (all in Virginia)	Class
2003	Westfield	35	Landstown	14	University of Richmond Stadium, Richmond	AAA Div. 6
2007	Westfield	42	Woodbridge	14	Scott Stadium, Charlottesville	AAA Div. 6
2015	Westfield	49	Oscar Smith	42	Scott Stadium, Charlottesville	6A
2016	Westfield	34	Oscar Smith	28	Armstrong Stadium, Hampton	6A
2017	Westfield	28	Oscar Smith	21	Armstrong Stadium, Hampton	Class 6

Basketball state championship games
Year	Winning team		Losing team		Location (all in Virginia)	Class
2015	Colonial Forge	47	Westfield	46	VCU, Richmond	6A
2016	Westfield	74	Oscar Smith	56	VCU, Richmond	6A
2026	Westfield	48	Landstown	44	VCU, Richmond	6A

Baseball state championship games
Year	Winning team		Losing team		Location (all in Virginia)	Class
2004	Western Branch	3	Westfield	2	War Memorial Stadium, Hampton	AAA
2019	Lake Braddock	6	Westfield	2	Deep Run High School	AAA
2023	James Madison	5	Westfield	4	John Champe HS, Aldie	AAA

Boys' lacrosse state championship games
Year	Winning team		Losing team		Location (all in Virginia)	Class
2007	Robinson	11	Westfield	3	Westfield High School, Chantilly	AAA

Boys' soccer state championship games
Year	Winning team		Losing team		Location (all in Virginia)	Class
2026	Westfield	4	James Madison	2	Independence High School, Ashburn	AAA

Girls' lacrosse state championship games
Year	Winning team		Losing team		Location (all in Virginia)	Class
2014	Westfield	13	Oakton	11	Lake Braddock Secondary School, Burke	AAA

Girls' field hockey state championship games
Year	Winning team		Losing team		Location (all in Virginia)	Class
2013	Westfield	2	First Colonial	1	Virginia Beach Sports Complex, Virginia Beach	AAA
2017	Westfield	2	First Colonial	1	Virginia Beach Sports Complex, Virginia Beach	AAA

Golf state tournaments
Year	Boys' team	Girls' open	Location (all in Virginia)	Class
2003	2nd	—		AAA
2004	4th	53rd	Chesdin Landing Golf Course, Chesterfield (boys); Two Rivers Country Club, Williamsburg (girls)	AAA
2005	2nd	—		AAA
2006	—	17th, 26th, 39th	Forest Greens Golf Course, Dumfries (girls)	AAA
2007	3rd	5th, 13th, 24th, 29th	Dominion Valley Country Club, Haymarket (boys); Fairfax National Golf Club, Centreville (girls)	AAA
2008	3rd	—	Independence Golf Course, Midlothian (boys)	AAA
2009	1st	—	Waterfront Country Club, Moneta (boys)	AAA
Virginia High School League does not rank teams overall in the girls' open. Each school fields individual players.

Track & field state tournaments
Year	Boys'		Girls'		Locations (all in Virginia)	Class
Year	Indoor	Outdoor	Indoor	Outdoor	Locations (all in Virginia)	Class
2001	—	—	27th	24th	George Mason Fieldhouse, Fairfax (indoor); Sports Backers Stadium, Richmond (outdoor)	AAA
2002	30th	—	23rd	—	George Mason Fieldhouse, Fairfax (indoor); Sports Backers Stadium, Richmond (outdoor)	AAA
2003	9th	5th	14th	29th	George Mason Fieldhouse, Fairfax (indoor); Sports Backers Stadium, Richmond (outdoor)	AAA
2004	2nd	1st	25th	24th	George Mason Fieldhouse, Fairfax (indoor); Todd Stadium, Newport News (outdoor)	AAA
2005	40th	41st	23rd	3rd	George Mason Fieldhouse, Fairfax (indoor); Todd Stadium, Newport News (outdoor)	AAA
2006	13th	54th	6th	8th	George Mason Fieldhouse, Fairfax (indoor); Todd Stadium, Newport News (outdoor)	AAA
2007	18th	22nd	13th	7th	George Mason Fieldhouse, Fairfax (indoor); Todd Stadium, Newport News (outdoor)	AAA

Virginia state champions (individuals)
Name	Year	Event	Sport/competition
Laura Ullrich	2001	Girls' 100M butterfly	Girls' swim
Rick Eddy	2001	Boys' 100M breaststroke	Boys' swim
Rick Eddy	2002	Boys' 100M breaststroke	Boys' swim
David Miller	2003	Longest field goal made	Football
Yeng Lan Beller	2003	Girls' 100M backstroke	Girls' swim
Yeng Lan Beller	2003	Girls' 100M butterfly	Girls' swim
Yeng Lan Beller	2003	AAA state meet record 100M butterfly	Girls' swim
Kathryn Pettine	2003	Girls' pole vault	Girls' indoor track and field
Yeng Lan Beller	2004	Girls' 100M butterfly	Girls' swim
Louis Corum	2004	Boys' shot put	Boys' outdoor track and field
Louis Corum	2004	Boys' discus	Boys' outdoor track and field
Philippe Tondereau	2004	Boys' 300M hurdles	Boys' outdoor track and field
David Groff	2004	Boys' 1000M run	Boys' indoor track and field
Scott Seymour	2004	Domestic extemporaneous speaking	Forensics
Scott Seymour	2004	Student Congress	Debate
Louis Corum	2004	Boys' high jump	Boys' track and field
MaryLynne Schaefer	2005	Girls' most three-point shots career	Girls' basketball
Betsy Alter	2005	Girls' pole vault	Girls' outdoor track and field
Brian Randall	2006	Outstanding Acting Award	Theatre
Branson Reese	2006	Outstanding Acting Award	Theatre
Lauren Burt	2006	Student Congress	Debate
Paul Grinups	2007	145 lbs weight class	Wrestling
Andrew Freidah	2007	Student Congress	Debate
Yillian Zhang	2007	Girls' singles champion	Girls' tennis
Matthew Anderson	2007	Boys' 800M run	Boys' outdoor track and field
Jake Carey	2008	145 lbs weight class	Wrestling
Matthew Anderson	2008	Boys' 1000M run	Boys' indoor track and field
Tasia Potasinski	2008	Girls' 1000M run	Girls' indoor track and field
Tasia Potasinski	2008	Girls' 1600M run	Girls' indoor track and field
Tasia Potasinski	2008	Girls' 1600M run	Girls' outdoor track and field
Andrew Freidah	2008	Student Congress	Debate
Austin Fallon	2009	189 lbs weight class	Wrestling
Austin Fallon	2010	189 lbs weight class	Wrestling
Shane Grannum	2010	Foreign extemporaneous speaking	Forensics
Shane Grannum	2010	Student Congress	Debate
Kurtis Ratcliff	2011	Boys' 100M butterfly	Boys' swim
CJ Fiala	2011	Boys' 100M freestyle	Boys' swim
Shane Grannum	2011	Extemporaneous speaking	Forensics
Beau Donahue	2011	140 lbs weight class	Wrestling
Beau Donahue	2012	152 lbs weight class	Wrestling
Madeleine Bloxam	2012	Outstanding Acting Award	Theatre
Mitchell Buckley	2012	Outstanding Acting Award	Theatre
Beau Donahue	2013	145 lbs weight class	Wrestling
Brandon Fiala	2013	Boys' 50M freestyle	Boys' swim
Nathan Kiley	2013	Boys' 800M run	Boys' outdoor track and field
Justin Yorkdale	2014	126 lbs weight class	Wrestling
Justin Yorkdale	2015	132 lbs weight class	Wrestling
Austin Knies	2015	285 lbs weight class	Wrestling
Johnny Pace	2015	Boys' 1600M run	Boys' indoor track and field
Jay Aiello	2016	195 lbs weight class	Wrestling
Chloe Hicks	2016	Girls' 100M backstroke	Girls' swim
Sara Freix	2016	Girls' 3200M run	Girls' outdoor track and field
Danielle Suh	2016	Girls' open champion	Golf

=== Theatre ===
Since the showing of its first production, an original creation of The Glass Menagerie, the school has continued to put on many theatre performences. Productions of Godspell and Fiddler on the Roof won Best Musical at the National Capital Area Cappies awards, and Rosencrantz & Guildenstern Are Dead won Best Play. Playwright Sheila Callaghan's Star-Crossed Lovers, a one-act rendition of William Shakespeare's Romeo and Juliet, was conceived by director Scott Pafumi and premiered at Westfield in 2004.

In 2007/08, the department's production of The Wiz was the subject of an ABC News 20/20 special entitled "Drama High" which aired on December 15, 2008. In 2010/11, Westfield's production of Joseph and the Amazing Technicolor Dreamcoat received a record 21 Cappies nominations. The show won 10 Cappies, including Best Musical, Best Song, and Lead Actor in a Musical.

Westfield Theatre also been invited to perform its own renditions of Romeo and Juliet and The Tempest at the Folger Shakespeare Library, an internationally renowned stage and research center devoted to the life and works of William Shakespeare.

During the spring of 2017, the spring musical Legally Blonde was nominated for 14 Cappies awards. Two years later, the school put on the high school edition of the Broadway musical Rock of Ages as their Cappies show, earning a total of 24 nominations, the most nominations earned in all of the Cappies program. At the Cappies Gala that year, they won a total of eight awards, including Best Musical.

=== Band ===
The band program is composed of ten performance groups including the Wind Symphony, the Symphonic Band, the Concert Band, the Jazz Ensemble, the after school Jazz Band, two Percussion Ensembles, the Color Guard, the Drumline, and the Marching Bulldogs. Participating in the performance groups are over 200 students and three instructors.

Westfield's band has been named a Virginia Honor Band twelve times for both its marching band and concert bands. The Westfield Percussion Ensemble has performed, by invitation, at a national festival. NSO director Leonard Slatkin visited Westfield in 2007 as a guest conductor. Both jazz bands have received awards at the Chantilly Invitational Jazz Festival, where several students were named for the All-Star Band, including Chandler Comer on trombone, Nicholas Serbu on trumpet, and Joseph Beddoes on drumset. The Jazz Ensemble has won the Chantilly Jazz Festival in 2014 and 2016. The jazz band recently had the help of Alan Baylock, Chief Arranger for the United States Air Force jazz band The Airmen of Note, who composed the piece "Torque" specifically for the Westfield Jazz Band. Both the concert bands and jazz ensembles have traveled to New York City to perform at Carnegie Hall. The bands have received top awards twice at Myrtle Beach, at a Disney competition in Orlando, Florida, and at a competition in Atlanta, Georgia.

The marching band was noted by local TV station WUSA 9 for its exemplary talent. The marching band performs its field show during the halftime of football games, and participates in various competitions throughout the marching season. There are also color and winter guards that perform with the marching band and in regional tournaments.

In 2013, the marching band was selected as one of 12 high school bands to perform in the 2014 Tournament of Roses parade. It became the first Fairfax County public high school to participate, and only the third Virginia public high school to march in the 125 years of the parade. Upon this achievement, the band has appeared on the news programs of ABC, CBS, and NBC. In addition, the band has been reported on by several newspapers including the Washington Post.

=== Music ===
The Westfield High School Choral Program consists of students in four different choral ensembles, spanning grades 9 through 12. The choirs have performed for the governor of Virginia, and for an audience of hundreds of music educators at the Virginia Music Educators State Conference. They have performed at the Kennedy Center for the Performing Arts and at Strathmore Hall through a partnership with the Washington Chorus.

The orchestra includes beginning, freshman, concert, chamber, and symphony orchestras.

The Marching Bulldogs participated in the 2014 Tournament of Roses Parade on January 1, 2014, in Pasadena, California.

=== Student publications ===
Front cover and athletics section divider of The Guardian's 2002 issue with the theme "Our World's in Fast Forward". The yearbook was released at the end of Westfield's second year. The National Scholastic Press Association named it one of Best of Show in its annual fall convention.

Westfield's English department is home to three publications.

Calliope not only accepts submissions for its literary and art magazine, but it also hosts coffeehouses in the fall and spring, where student bands, guitarists, and poets perform live. It also hosts an annual film festival for videos made by Westfield students. The magazine won the Gold Circle award from the Columbia Scholastic Press Association for its design.

The Guardian yearbook won a Yearbook Pacemaker Award from the National Scholastic Press Association (NSPA), and the Silver Crown from the Columbia Scholastic Press Association. Between 2002 and 2004, the NSPA considered it one of the Best of Show winners in its annual national journalism conventions.

The Watchdog newspaper has received an All-Southern rating from the Southern Interscholastic Press Association. It has one of the largest circulations for a high school newspaper in the western Fairfax County area, because the newspaper is mailed home to families of students free of charge.

=== Clubs and organizations ===
Honor societies at Westfield include National Honor Society, National Art Honor Society, National English Honor Society, Spanish National Honor Society, French National Honor Society, German National Honor Society, Japanese Honor Society, National Latin Honor Society, History Honor Society, Mathematics Honor Society, Science Honor Society, Marketing Honor Society, Tri-M, International Thespian Society, and Quill and Scroll.

Future Business Leaders of America (FBLA-PBL) and DECA have their own chapters for business and marketing students. The DECA chapter, along with chapters at other FCPS high schools, began a pilot G.O.A.L. (Gaining Occupational Awareness and Learning) Zone internship program in 2003 between FCPS schools and D.C. United.

Westfield High School has a TSA (Technology Student Association) chapter that began in 2012.

Several academic teams compete in regional tournaments as part of the Virginia High School League (VHSL). Westfield's It's Academic team annually competes in tournaments hosted by the VHSL and NBC 4, as well as tournaments hosted by other area schools. The team won its first television match on NBC 4 in the show's 44th season, after only its third appearance. The Science Club holds after-school experiments that all students can participate in, and the Science Olympiad team annually competes in the Division C state tournament and has won several medals. The Fellowship of Christian Athletes annually sponsors See You at the Pole for students and faculty.

The Westfield debate and forensics teams have received numerous awards and distinctions. The debate team has been ranked in the top five teams since 2004, and Forensics placed fourth overall in the 2004 VHSL state tournament. The Forensics team also won second place in the Foreign Extemporaneous Speaking individual event at the 2007 state tournament.

In 2007, Westfield and its business partner Northrop Grumman teamed with NASA to participate in the school's first FIRST Robotics Competition at Virginia Commonwealth University for a regional event.

In 2019, the Westfield High School Politics Club held its first meeting on October 10. In 2020, the Westfield Politics Club invited guest speakers Delegate Dan Helmer, Senator Dick Saslaw, and Congressman Gerry Connolly to speak about their experiences in working in government and politics.

== Notable alumni ==
=== Sports ===
- Jonathan Aiello, freestyle wrestler; won WHS football championship in 2015 and WHS Wrestling State Championship in 2016
- Eugene Asante, linebacker; won WHS football championships in 2015, 2016, 2017
- Justin Bour, first baseman for the Hanshin Tigers of NPB in Japan
- Brent Bowden, former American football punter, drafted by the Tampa Bay Buccaneers in the sixth round of the 2010 NFL draft, played college football at Virginia Tech
- Jonny Farmelo, center fielder selected in the first round of 2023 Major League Baseball draft by the Seattle Mariners
- Blake Francis, professional basketball player for the Capital City Go-Go, formerly for the Westchester Knicks and Raptors 905, and the Richmond Spiders and Wagner Seahawks in college
- Mike Glennon, NFL quarterback for the New York Giants, played for NC State; won WHS football championship in 2007
- Sean Glennon, former quarterback for Virginia Tech Hokies; won WHS football championship in 2003
- Brandon Snyder, first baseman selected in first round of 2005 Major League Baseball draft by the Baltimore Orioles, currently coaching catchers for the Washington Nationals
- Eddie Royal, wide receiver; won WHS football championship in 2003
- Evan Royster, running back; won WHS football championship in 2003

=== Arts and media ===
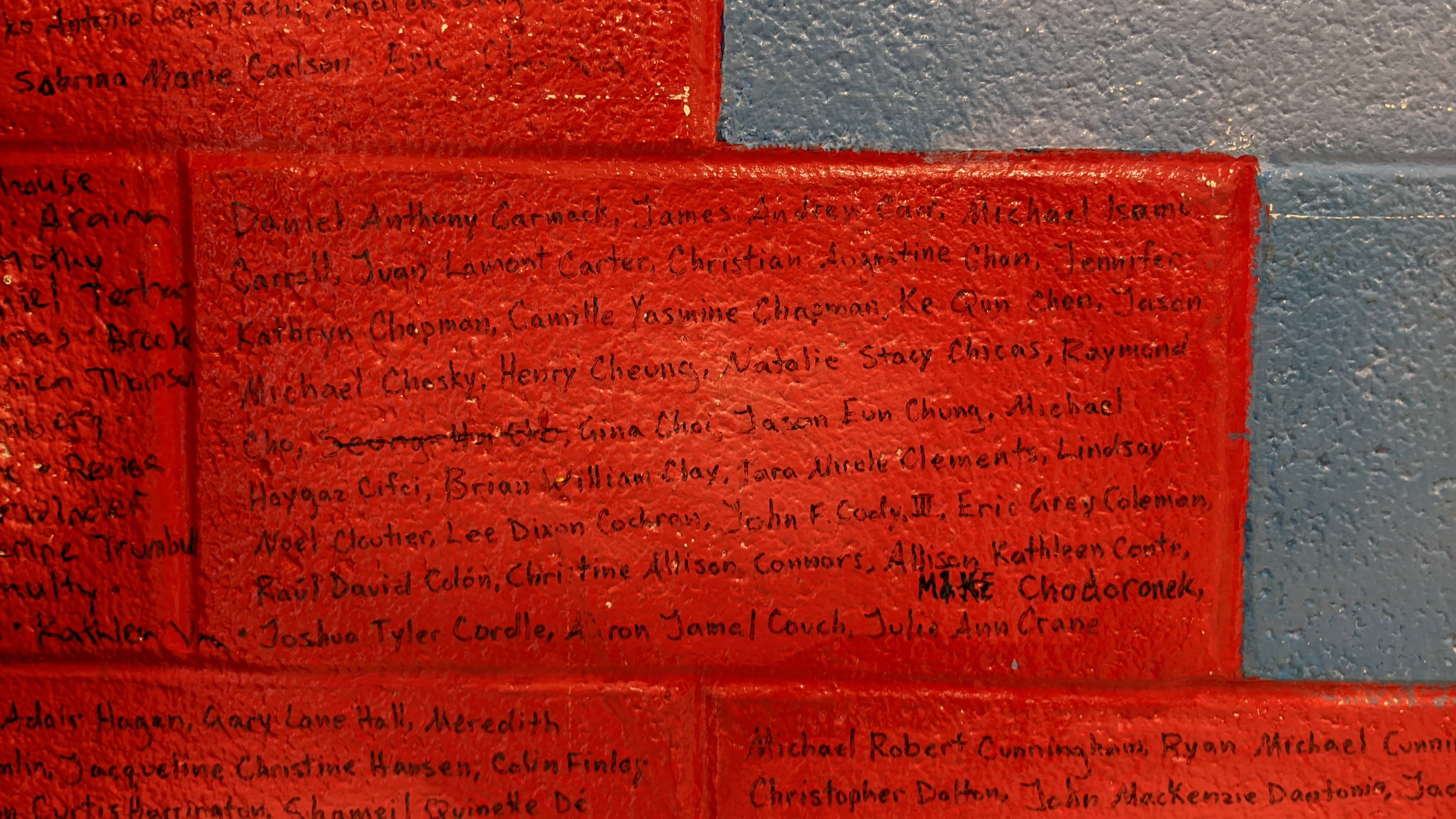
Seung-Hui Cho's strikethroughed signature

- Cameron Leahy, lead singer for The Downtown Fiction; started band with past drummer Eric Jones in summer of '08
- Tim Peugh, bassist for Alien Ant Farm, and Crobot

=== Other ===
- Seung-Hui Cho, gunman responsible for the Virginia Tech massacre
