= CEPA =

CEPA may refer to:

- Cepa (fly), a genus of hoverfly in the tribe Merodontini
- Comprehensive economic partnership agreement (disambiguation), several uses
- Armenia–EU Comprehensive and Enhanced Partnership Agreement
- Canadian Environmental Protection Act, 1999
- Center for Education Policy Analysis, at Stanford University, US
- Closer Economic Partnership Arrangement, between China and its special administrative regions
- Common Educational Proficiency Assessment, in the UAE
- Centro Ponceño de Autismo, an autism center in Ponce, Puerto Rico

== See also ==
- CIPA (disambiguation)
- SEPA (disambiguation)
- Onion, Allium cepa
