= CECA =

CECA may refer to:

- Ceca (singer) (born 1973), a Serbian singer
- Confederación Española de Cajas de Ahorros, the Spanish Confederation of Savings Banks
- Civil Engineering Contractors Association, a membership association for civil engineering contractors in the UK
- the French, Portuguese, Italian and Spanish acronym for the European Coal and Steel Community
- Ceca, plural of cecum
- Comprehensive economic partnership agreement (disambiguation)
- Ceca Foundation, a healthcare non-profit in the US
