= Brent Bowden =

American football player (born 1987)

No. 97
- Position: Punter

Personal information
- Born: May 21, 1987 (age 39); Huntsville, Alabama, U.S.
- Listed height: 6 ft 3 in (1.91 m)
- Listed weight: 202 lb (92 kg)

Career information
- High school: Westfield (Chantilly, Virginia)
- College: Virginia Tech
- NFL draft: 2010: 6th round, 172nd overall pick

Career history
- Tampa Bay Buccaneers (2010)*; Jacksonville Jaguars (2011)*; Virginia Destroyers (2012)
- * Offseason or practice squad member only

Awards and highlights
- First-team All-ACC (2009)
- Stats at Pro Football Reference

Brent Michael Bowden (born May 21, 1987) is an American former professional football player who was a punter in the National Football League (NFL). He was selected by the Tampa Bay Buccaneers in the sixth round of the 2010 NFL draft. He played college football for the Virginia Tech Hokies.

Bowden was also a member of the Jacksonville Jaguars and Virginia Destroyers.

== Early life ==
Bowden was born on May 21, 1987, in Huntsville, Alabama, to Tim and Denise Bowden. His older brother, Chris Hall, was a punter for the Florida State Seminoles. His younger brother, Grant, is currently a punter at Liberty University. He attended Westfield High School in Fairfax County, Virginia, where he lettered in football as a punter. In 2003, his junior year, he averaged 40 yards per punt, with a net average of 38 yards, and a long of 64 yards. He had seven punts that were downed inside the 20-yard line and 11 punts that were fair caught. In 2004, his senior year, he had 29 punts for an average of 44 yards and a net average of 37 yards. His longest punt was 58 yards and he had 16 of his punts downed inside the 20-yard line, nine downed inside the 10-yard line and five inside the 5-yard line. Eight of his punts were fair catches. He earned Associated Press and Virginia High School Coaches Association first-team all-state honors after his senior season. He was named first-team All-Concorde District, All-Northern Region and The Washington Post All-Met. Scout.com ranked him as high as the fourth-best high school punter in the nation at one point.

== College career ==
=== 2005 season ===
In 2005, Bowden was redshirted and served as the backup punter behind Nic Schmitt. He dressed for all 13 games, but did not see any playing time. In the Maroon-White spring scrimmage, he punted three times for an average of 44.7 yards, a long of 48 yards and had one punt downed inside the 20-yard line.

=== 2006 season ===
In 2006, Bowden dressed for every game in the season, but, like the previous season, did not play in any of them. He was the backup to Schmitt again at punter and was the backup holder on kicks.

=== 2007 season ===
In 2007, Bowden became the starting punter for the Hokies after Nic Schmitt graduated. In the season-opener against East Carolina, Bowden punted six times for an average of 42.3 yards per punt. He had a long of 52, and four of his punts landed inside the 20-yard line. Against LSU, Bowden punted eight times for an average of 40.1 yards per punt with four punts downed inside the 20-yard line. He had a long of 44. Against Ohio, Bowden punted seven times for an average of 41.3 yards per punt, with three landing inside the 20-yard line. He had one punt that landed in the endzone for a touchback, and he had a long of 47. In the September 22 game against William & Mary, Bowden punted eight times for an average of 43.1 yards per punt. He had a long of 52 and had three punts landed inside the 20-yard line and one go into the endzone for a touchback. Against North Carolina, Bowden had seven punts for 302 yards and a 43.1 average, with one punt going 59 yards. He had one touchback and two punts that landed inside the 20-yard line. Against Clemson on October 6, Bowden punted eight times for a 46.4 average yards per punt. Two punts landed inside the 20-yard line and three were touchbacks. In the October 25 game against Boston College, Bowden punted eight times for a 39.4 average with one touchback and three punts that landed inside the 20-yard line. Against Georgia Tech, Bowden punted seven times for a 47.1 average and a punt that went 54 yards. Against the Virginia Cavaliers, Bowden punted four times for an average of 48.3 yards per punt with one punt that went 57 yards. In the ACC Championship Game against Boston College, Bowden punted seven times for a 46.3 punting average with two touchbacks, one punt that landed inside the 20-yard line and one punt that went 54 yards.

For 2007 Bowden started and played in all 14 games (including ACC Championship and Bowl Game) and tied the VT record for most punts in a year with 87 (42.6 gross, 36.8 net) while Dunlevy had 1 punt, totaling 88 VT punts for the year (70 field punts 43.6 avg and 18 pooch punts 38.2). Of the 88 punts 33 (37% of kicks) were punted Inside the 20 (I20) with 28 downed I20, 22 fair catches, 27 returns (207 yds), 6 out-of-bounds, and longest 59 yds. Bowden held for all FGs and PATs,

=== 2008 season ===
For 2008 Bowden started and played all 14 games (including ACC Championship and Bowl Game) with 69 punts with a gross average of 40.4 yds. Bowden, as a directional punter, had 55 field punts averaging 42.2 yards while the 14 pooch punts averaged 33.2 yds, kicking from as close as the 35 yd line. He punted 27 (39% of kicks) I20 with 24 downed I20, 23 returns (259 yds), 11 Fair Catches, 6 touchbacks, 11 out of bounds, and longest 57 yds. He held for all FGs and PATs. He played the year with a back strain.

=== 2009 season ===
For 2009 Bowden started and played in all 13 games with 57 punts, 43.65 gross (46.4 field, 37.3 pooch), 37.2 net, punted 21 I20 (36.8%), 20 downed I20 (36.1%), 13 fair catches (22.8%), 20 returns (172 yds), 10 out of bounds, and longest 60 yds. Bowden was named the first-team All-ACC punter for 2009 with a 43.8 gross average.

College career started and played 41 games in a row as punter and holder, 214 punts (170 field, 44 pooch), 9015 yards, 42.13 gross (43.62 field, 36.34 pooch), 36.88 net, 81 punted I20 (37.9%) and 72 downed I20 (33.65%), 70 returns (466 yds), and 46 fair catches (21.5%).

Bowden played in the Texas vs. The Nation Game on February 6, 2010, averaging over 50 yards on 8 punts.

== Professional career ==
=== Pre-draft ===
Bowden was ranked as the second-best punter in the 2010 NFL draft by NFLDraftScout.com, and was projected to be selected in the seventh round. He was invited to participate in the 2010 NFL Scouting Combine.

=== Tampa Bay Buccaneers ===
Bowden was selected by the Tampa Bay Buccaneers in the sixth round (172nd overall) of the 2010 NFL draft. He was signed to a four-year contract on June 16, 2010. He was released on September 6 to make room for Chris Bryan. Bowden was re-signed to the team's practice squad on September 8, but was released on September 14.

=== Jacksonville Jaguars ===
On August 13, 2011, Bowden signed with the Jacksonville Jaguars. He was waived on August 25.

=== Virginia Destroyers ===
Brent signed with the Virginia Destroyers September 2012. In the first game against Las Vegas he averaged 48.5 yards on 4 punts with two inside the 20-yard line.
