= Comprehensive economic partnership agreement =

A comprehensive economic partnership agreement (CEPA) or comprehensive economic cooperation agreement (CECA) is a free trade agreement between two countries and may specifically refer to:

- Armenia-EU Comprehensive and Enhanced Partnership Agreement
- Australia–India Comprehensive Economic Cooperation Agreement
- Comprehensive Economic Cooperation Agreement, between India and Malaysia
- Comprehensive Economic Partnership Agreement between India and South Korea
- Comprehensive Economic Partnership Agreement between Indonesia and the European Union, in Indonesia–European Union trade relations
- Comprehensive Economic Partnership for East Asia
- India–Singapore Comprehensive Economic Cooperation Agreement
- Indonesia–Australia Comprehensive Economic Partnership Agreement
- Regional Comprehensive Economic Partnership

== See also ==
- CEPA (disambiguation)
- CECA (disambiguation)
- Free-trade area
