= Mainland China =

Geopolitical term for China without Hong Kong, Macau, Taiwan

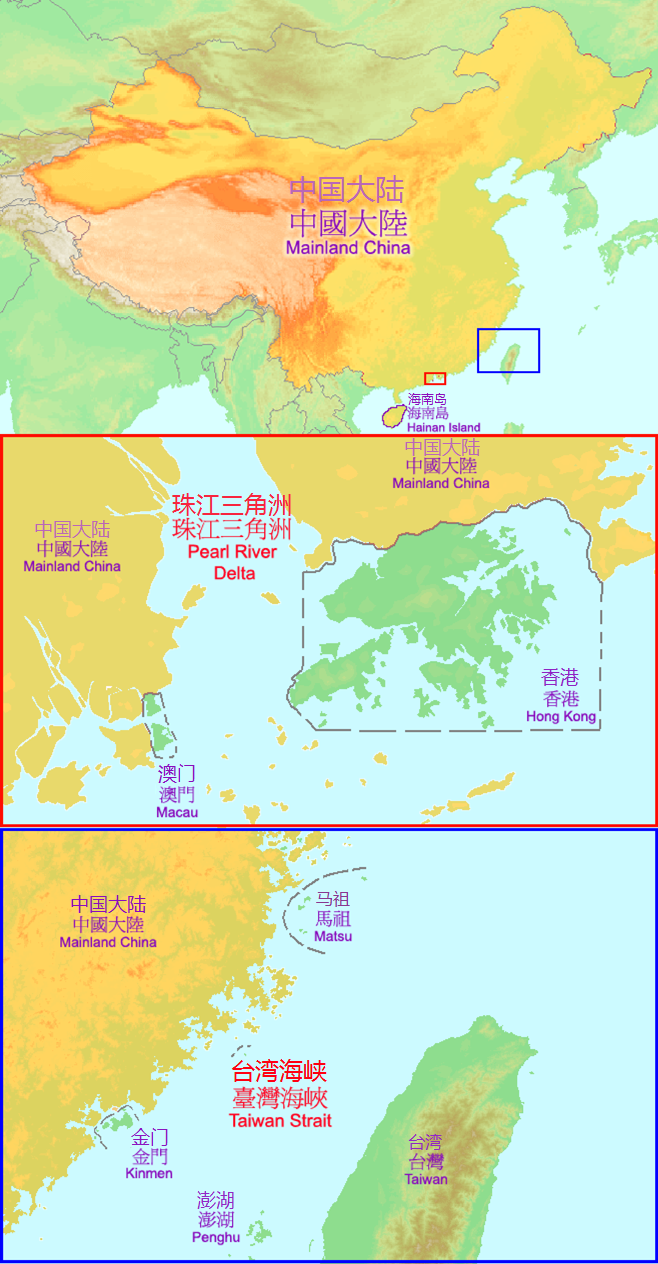
- The geopolitical term "mainland China" (the highlighted area as shown above) defined as territories under direct administration of the People's Republic of China, including islands of Hainan and Zhoushan, etc.
- Largest cities: Shanghai; Beijing; Chongqing; Tianjin; Guangzhou; Shenzhen
- Official language: Standard Chinese (de facto)
- Ethnic groups: See Ethnic groups in China
- Demonym: Chinese

Area
  - Total: 9,596,961 km^{2} (3,705,407 sq mi)

Population
  - 2019 census: 1,400,050,000
  - Density: 147/km^{2} (380.7/sq mi)
- Currency: Renminbi (RMB)
- Time zone: UTC+8 (China Standard Time)
- Calling code: +86
- Internet TLD: .cn; .中国; .中國
- Today part of: People's Republic of China

Chinese name
- Simplified Chinese: 中国大陆
- Traditional Chinese: 中國大陸
- Literal meaning: Continental China
Transcriptions
Standard Mandarin
- Hanyu Pinyin: Zhōnggúo Dàlù
- Bopomofo: ㄓㄨㄥ ㄍㄨㄛˊ ㄉㄚˋ ㄌㄨˋ
- Gwoyeu Romatzyh: Jonggwo Dahluh
- Wade–Giles: Chung¹-Kuo² Ta⁴-lu⁴
- Tongyong Pinyin: Jhonggúo Dàlù
- MPS2: Jūng-gúo Dà-lù
Wu
- Romanization: tson^{平} koh^{入} du^{去} loh^{入}
Yue: Cantonese
- Yale Romanization: Jūnggwok Daaihluhk
- Jyutping: zung^{1} gwok^{3} daai^{6} luk^{6}
Southern Min
- Hokkien POJ: Tiong-kok Tāi-lio̍k
Eastern Min
- Fuzhou BUC: Dṳ̆ng-guók Dâi-lṳ̆k

Alternative Chinese name
- Simplified Chinese: 中国内地
- Traditional Chinese: 中國內地
- Literal meaning: Inland China
Transcriptions
Standard Mandarin
- Hanyu Pinyin: Zhōnggúo Nèidì
Wu
- Romanization: tson^{平} koh^{入} ne^{去} di^{去}
Yue: Cantonese
- Yale Romanization: Jūnggwok Noihdeih
- Jyutping: zung^{1} gwok^{3} noi^{6} dei^{6}
Southern Min
- Hokkien POJ: Tiong-kok lōe-tē / lōe-tōe

Mainland Area of the Republic of China
- Simplified Chinese: 中华民国大陆地区
- Traditional Chinese: 中華民國大陸地區
Transcriptions
Standard Mandarin
- Hanyu Pinyin: Zhōnghuá Mínguó Dàlù Dìqū
- Wade–Giles: Chung-hua min-kuo ta-lu ti-ch'ü

"Mainland China" (Note: Alternatively the term is also referred to as "the Chinese mainland" or "the mainland of China", which are preferred by explicitly pro-Beijing bodies, including the government of the People's Republic of China, the government of Hong Kong and the government of Macau. While the more common term in the English-speaking world and in Taiwan, Hong Kong, and Macau is "mainland China".) is a geopolitical term defined as the territory under direct administration of the People's Republic of China (PRC) in the aftermath of the Chinese Civil War. In addition to the geographical mainland, the geopolitical sense of the term includes islands such as Hainan, Chongming, and Zhoushan.

By convention, the following territories are excluded from the term:

- Special administrative regions of China, which are regarded as subdivisions of the country, but retain distinct administrative, judicial and economic systems from those on the mainland:
  - Hong Kong, formerly a British colony
  - Macau, formerly a Portuguese colony
- Taiwan, along with Penghu, Kinmen, Matsu and other minor islands, are collectively known as the Taiwan Area, where has been the major territorial base of the government of Taiwan (ROC) since 1950. The ROC still claims the "Mainland Area" as its constitutionally defined territory.

In Taiwan, the term is often used to refer to all territories administered by the PRC. The term is widely used in Hong Kong, Macau, and Taiwan as well as internationally, including by many Overseas Chinese communities and diasporas.

== Background ==
In 1949, the Chinese Communist Party (CCP) and the People's Liberation Army had largely defeated the Kuomintang (KMT)'s National Revolutionary Army in the Chinese Civil War. This forced the Kuomintang to relocate the government and institution of the Republic of China to the relative safety of Taiwan, an island which was placed under its control after the surrender of Japan at the end of World War II in 1945. With the establishment of the People's Republic of China on 1 October 1949, the CCP-controlled government saw itself as the sole legitimate government of China, competing with the claims of the Republic of China, whose authority is now limited to Taiwan and other islands. This resulted in a situation in which two co-existing governments competed for international legitimacy and recognition as the "government of China". With the democratisation of Taiwan in the 1990s and the rise of the Taiwanese independence movement, some people began simply using the term "China" instead.

Due to their status as colonies of foreign states during the establishment of the People's Republic of China in 1949, the phrase "mainland China" excludes Hong Kong and Macau. Since the return of Hong Kong and Macau to Chinese sovereignty in 1997 and 1999, respectively, the two territories have retained their legal, political, and economic systems. The territories also have their distinct identities. Therefore, "mainland China" generally continues to exclude these territories, because of the "one country, two systems" policy adopted by the Chinese government towards the regions. The term is also used in economic indicators, such as the IMD Competitiveness Report. International news media often use "China" to refer only to the mainland of the People's Republic of China.

== Political use ==
=== People's Republic of China ===
The Exit and Entry Administration Law of the People's Republic of China (Chinese: 中华人民共和国出境入境管理法) defines two terms in Chinese that are translated to "mainland":

- Dàlù (大陆; 大陸), which means 'the continent'.
- Nèidì (内地; 內地), literally 'inland' or 'inner land'. It excludes Hong Kong and Macau.

In the PRC, usage of the two terms is not strictly interchangeable. To emphasise the One-China policy and not give the ROC "equal footing" in cross-strait relations, the term must be used in PRC's official contexts with reference to Taiwan (with the PRC referring to itself as the "mainland side" dealing with the "Taiwan side"). In fact, the PRC government mandates that journalists use "Taiwan" and "the Mainland" (Dàlù) as corresponding concepts.

But in terms of Hong Kong and Macau, the PRC government refers to itself as "the Central People's Government". In the People's Republic of China, the term 内地 (Nèidì, 'inland') is often contrasted with the term 境外 ('outside the border') for things outside the mainland region. Examples include "Administration of Foreign-funded Banks" (中华人民共和国外资银行管理条例; 中華人民共和國外資銀行管理條例) or the "Measures on Administration of Representative Offices of Foreign Insurance Institutions" (外国保险机构驻华代表机构管理办法; 外國保險機構駐華代表機構管理辦法).

Hainan is an island, but is nevertheless commonly considered to be part of the "mainland" politically, because its government, legal and political systems do not differ from the rest of the PRC. Nonetheless, Hainanese people still refer to the geographic mainland as "the mainland" and call its residents "mainlanders".

Before 1949, the Kinmen and Matsu islands, were jointly governed with the rest of Fujian Province under successive Chinese governments. The two territories are generally considered to belong to the same historical region, Fujian Province, which has been divided since 1949 as a result of the civil war. However, because they are not controlled by the PRC, they are not included as part of "mainland China".

Some Internet platforms like Bilibili bans the term "mainland China" on their website and considered its use promoting separatism and undermining the integrity of national sovereignty. They require that the term should be replaced as "Chinese mainland", "China's mainland" and "the mainland of China". According to the Foreign Ministry of the People's Republic of China, "Chinese mainland" is the correct term because "mainland China" supposedly implies that there are other Chinas.

=== Hong Kong and Macau ===
Hong Kong and Macau have been territories of the PRC since 1997 and 1999 respectively. However, due to the One Country, Two Systems policy, the two regions maintain a degree of autonomy, hence they are not governed as part of mainland China.

Geographically speaking, Hong Kong and Macau are both connected to mainland China in certain areas (e.g. the north of the New Territories). Additionally, the islands contained within Hong Kong (e.g. Hong Kong Island) and Macau are much closer to mainland China than Taiwan and Hainan, and are much smaller.

In Hong Kong and Macau, the terms "mainland China" and "mainlander" are frequently used for people from PRC-governed areas (i.e. not Taiwan, Hong Kong, and Macau). The Chinese term Neidi (內地), meaning the inland but still translated mainland in English, is commonly applied by SAR governments to represent non-SAR areas of PRC, including Hainan province and coastal regions of mainland China, such as "Constitutional and Mainland Affairs" (政制及內地事務局) and Immigration Departments. In the Mainland and Hong Kong Closer Economic Partnership Arrangement (as well as the Mainland and Macau Closer Economic Partnership Arrangement) the CPG also uses the Chinese characters 内地 "inner land", with the note that they refer to the "customs territory of China".

=== Taiwan (Republic of China) ===
The complete ROC national territory as interpreted by the First National Assembly in May 1979

Currently, the scope of the "mainland area" as interpreted by Taiwan's Executive Yuan (light green)

References to the PRC and other lost continental territories as the mainland began appearing in Taiwan state documents as early as 1954.

Legal definitions followed in the 1990s. The 1991 Additional Articles of the Constitution of the Republic of China stated that "the handling of people's rights and obligations and other affairs between the free area and the mainland can be specially stipulated by law", and used the legal term "mainland area" without defining its geographical boundaries. The 1992 Regulations on the Relations between the People in Taiwan and the Mainland defined "Taiwan" as areas controlled by the ROC and "mainland" as "the territory of the Republic of China". The related Cross-Strait Act called those under PRC jurisdiction - excluding those in Hong Kong and Macau - as "people of the mainland area", and used "free area of the Republic of China" to describe areas under ROC control. The issue on the mainland's territory also stated in the Judicial Yuan Interpretation No. 328 in 1993. In 2012, the Supreme Court of the Republic of China's judgment #900 labeled the Macao Special Administrative Region as the "Mainland's Macau Area". The 2002 amendments to the executive order Enforcement Rules for the Act Governing Relations between Peoples of the Taiwan Area and the Mainland Area defined the mainland as areas claimed but not controlled by the ROC, corresponding to "areas under control of the Chinese Communists" (within the de facto borders of the People's Republic of China).

Views of the term "mainland China" (中國大陸) vary on Taiwan. During the Dangguo era, the KMT had previously referred to the territories under the control of the Chinese Communist Party (CCP) by several different names, e.g. "(territory controlled by the) Communist bandits", "occupied/unfree area (of China)", "Communist China" (as opposed to either "Nationalist China" or "Democratic China"), "Red China" (as opposed to "Blue China"), and "mainland China (area)". In modern times, many of these terms have fallen out of use. The terms "mainland China" (中國大陸) or "the mainland" (大陸) still remain in popular use, but some also simply use the term "China" (中國). The former term is generally preferred by the Pan-Blue Coalition led by the KMT, while the latter term is preferred by the Pan-Green Coalition led by the Democratic Progressive Party (DPP), which opposes the term "mainland" and its suggestion that Taiwan is part of China. This has caused many political debates.

== Usage of excluding SARs ==
Mainland China (中國內地), simply Mainland (Chinese: 內地; lit. 'Inland'), is a political and legal term referring to the areas under the direct jurisdiction of the People's Republic of China, excluding the regions of Hong Kong and Macau. It is used in the People's Republic of China. This term is often used in contexts where the special administrative regions of Hong Kong and Macau are mentioned, and in some cases, it is synonymous with "mainland China" (中國大陸). Nevertheless, in Taiwan, "mainland China" is also often used to refer to all territories administered by the People's Republic of China, including Hong Kong and Macau.

=== Legal uses ===
==== Mainland China ====
On 30 December 1954, the Supreme People's Court of the People's Republic of China addressed a marital issue between a spouse residing in Inland and another residing in Hong Kong or Macau. The court used the term "mainland" in its official response, "Reply of the Supreme People's Court Regarding the Handling Opinions on Marital Issues with One Spouse Residing in Mainland and the Other in Hong Kong or Macau." This terminology arose from a divorce case between a person from Hong Kong and another from Zhoushan.

On 6 December 1984, in a reply by the Supreme People's Court titled "Reply of the Supreme People's Court on the Issue of Whether Civil Cases Involving Hong Kong and Macau Compatriots Holding 'British National Overseas Passports' Issued by the Hong Kong British Authorities and Identity Cards Issued by the Macau Portuguese Authorities in Mainland Chinese People's Courts Should Be Treated as Foreign-Related Cases," it was pointed out that holders of such documents are considered Chinese citizens, not recognizing them as having British or Portuguese nationality; hence their civil cases in Mainland Chinese courts should not be treated as foreign-related cases.

On 30 June 2012, the Eleventh National People's Congress passed Article 89 of the "Exit and Entry Administration Law of the People's Republic of China," which states: "Exiting refers to traveling from Mainland China to other countries or regions, from Mainland China to the Hong Kong Special Administrative Region, the Macau Special Administrative Region, or from the Mainland China to the Taiwan region". This law symmetrically aligns "Mainland China" with the Hong Kong and Macau Special Administrative Regions, and in English versions, both are uniformly translated as "Chinese Mainland".

Additionally, the term "Mainland residents" is commonly used in contexts related to immigration control, tourism, and marriage, such as individual travel from Hong Kong and Macau, and Mainland Travel Permits for Hong Kong and Macau residents.

==== Hong Kong ====
In 1997, the Standing Committee of the National People's Congress (NPC) passed the "Decision of the Standing Committee of the National People's Congress on Handling the Existing Laws of Hong Kong in Accordance with Article 160 of the Basic Law of the Hong Kong Special Administrative Region of the People's Republic of China", which required that any references in Hong Kong laws to "Mainland", "Taiwan", "Hong Kong", and "Macau" should be interpreted as referring to parts of the People's Republic of China. The Hong Kong Interpretation and General Clauses Ordinance stipulates that "'China' refers to the People's Republic of China", and "'the People's Republic of China' includes the Hong Kong and Macau Special Administrative Regions".

In 2003, the Ministry of Commerce and the Financial Secretary of Hong Kong signed the "Mainland and Hong Kong Closer Economic Partnership Arrangement" defining "mainland" as "all the tariff territory of the People's Republic of China".

On 1 April 2006, the "Mainland Affairs Liaison Office", under the Constitutional Affairs Bureau, was established, and on 1 July 2007, during the administration of Donald Tsang, it was renamed the "Constitutional and Mainland Affairs Bureau".

==== Macau ====
In 1999, the Standing Committee of the National People's Congress (NPC) passed the "Decision of the Standing Committee of the National People's Congress on Handling the Existing Laws of Macau in Accordance with Article 145 of the Basic Law of the Macau Special Administrative Region of the People's Republic of China." This decision required that any references in Macau's laws that mentioned Mainland China, Taiwan, Hong Kong, and Macau, either individually or together, should be interpreted as referring to parts of the People's Republic of China. Law No. 1/1999 of Macau, also known as the "Reunification Law", restated relevant parts of the decision in its Annex IV.

In 2003, the Ministry of Commerce and Macau's Secretary for Economy and Finance signed the "Closer Economic Partnership Arrangement (CEPA) between Mainland and Macau" which defined "mainland" as "all the tariff territory of the People's Republic of China".

=== Usage in entertainment industry ===
In order to differentiate from the entertainment industries of Europe, America, Taiwan, Japan, Korea, and Hong Kong, the entertainment industry in mainland China is often referred to as the "Mainland entertainment industry" or simply "Mainland entertainment". Artists who have developed their careers within the People's Republic of China are also referred to as "mainland artists".

== Other terms ==
Other geography-related terms which are used to avoid mentioning the political status of the PRC and ROC.

Simplified Chinese	Traditional Chinese	Pinyin	Jyutping	Hokkien POJ	Description
海峡两岸	海峽兩岸	Hǎixiá liǎng'àn	Hoi^{2} haap^{6} loeng^{5} ngon^{6}	Hái-kiap lióng-gān	The physical shores on both sides of the straits, may be translated as "two shores".
两岸关系	兩岸關係	liǎng'àn guānxì	loeng^{5} ngon^{6} gwaan^{1} hai^{6}	lióng-gān koan-hē	Reference to the Taiwan Strait (cross-Strait relations, literally "relations between the two sides/shores [of the Strait of Taiwan]").
两岸三地	兩岸三地	liǎng'àn sāndì	loeng^{5} ngon^{6} saam^{1} dei^{6}	lióng-gān sam-tè	An extension of this is the phrase "two shores, three places", with "three places" meaning mainland China, Taiwan, and either Hong Kong or Macau.
两岸四地	兩岸四地	liǎng'àn sìdì	loeng^{5} ngon^{6} sei^{3} dei^{6}	lióng-gān sù-tè	When referring to either Hong Kong or Macau, or "two shores, four places" when referring to both Hong Kong and Macau.

== See also ==
- China
- Mainlander
- Greater China
- Additional Articles of the Constitution of the Republic of China
- China proper
  - Heihe–Tengchong Line
- Constitution of China
- Free area of the Republic of China
- Free China
- Politics of China
