= Economic Cooperation Framework Agreement =

Trade agreement between the People's Republic of China and the Republic of China (Taiwan)

ECFA
Economic Cooperation Framework Agreement 海峽兩岸經濟合作架構協議 海峡两岸经济合作架构协议
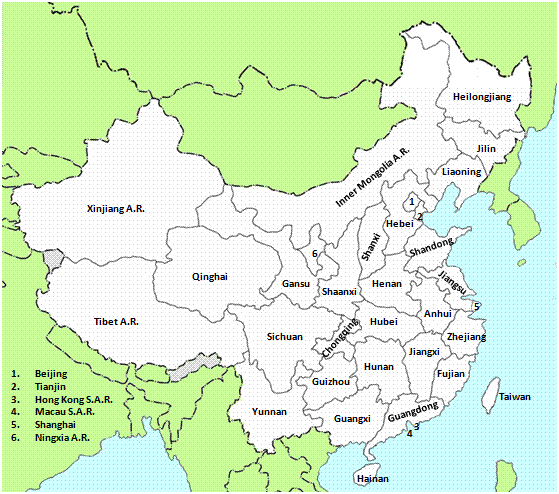
- Regions under the ECFA
- Type: Free Trade Agreement
- Signed: June 29, 2010; 15 years ago
- Location: Sofitel Forebase Chongqing Hotel, Chongqing, China
- Effective: September 12, 2010; 15 years ago
- Signatories: Chairman Chiang Pin-kung President Chen Yunlin
- Parties: Straits Exchange Foundation (China) Association for Relations Across the Taiwan Straits
- Language: Mandarin Chinese (Note: Traditional Chinese (Guoyu) Simplified Chinese (Putonghua))

Full text
- zh:海峽兩岸服務貿易協議 at Wikisource

Economic Cooperation Framework Agreement
- Traditional Chinese: 兩岸經濟合作架構協議(定)
- Simplified Chinese: 两岸经济合作架构协议(定)
Transcriptions
Standard Mandarin
- Hanyu Pinyin: Liǎng'àn Jīngjì Hézuò Jiàgòu Xiéyì
Yue: Cantonese
- Jyutping: loeng^{5} ngon^{6} ging^{1} zai^{3} ha^{6} zok^{3} gaa^{3} kau^{3} hip^{3} ji^{5}
Southern Min
- Hokkien POJ: lióng-gān-keng-chè-ha̍p-chok-kè-lòu-hia̍p-gī

Alternative Chinese name
- Traditional Chinese: 兩岸經濟協議(定)
- Simplified Chinese: 两岸经济协议(定)
Transcriptions
Standard Mandarin
- Hanyu Pinyin: Liǎng'àn Jīngjì Xiéyì
Yue: Cantonese
- Jyutping: loeng^{5} ngon^{6} ging^{1} zai^{3} hip^{3} ji^{5}
Southern Min
- Hokkien POJ: lióng-gān-keng-chè-hia̍p-gī

The Economic Cooperation Framework Agreement (ECFA) is a free trade agreement (FTA) between the governments of the People's Republic of China (mainland China, PRC, commonly "China") and the Republic of China (ROC, commonly "Taiwan"), that aims to reduce tariffs and commercial barriers as well as improve cross-strait relations.

The pact was signed on June 29, 2010, in Chongqing, and was seen as the most significant agreement since the two sides split after the Chinese Civil War in 1949, since neither governments recognize the other as being the sole government of China. It was expected to boost the then current US$197.28 billion bilateral trade between both sides. In May 2024, following the inauguration of Lai Ching-te, the PRC suspended preferential tariff arrangements on 134 items under the ECFA.

== Background ==
The government of the People's Republic of China uses its influence on neighboring economic powers to prevent them from signing free-trade agreements (FTAs) with the Republic of China ("Taiwan") which China claims that the ROC has been eliminated and so Taiwan is part of its territory. Instead, under the leadership of the Kuomintang, Taipei was motivated to sign the ECFA with mainland China partly in hope that once it has this agreement the PRC will stop pressuring other countries to avoid such agreements with Taiwan, as well as to counteract the negative consequences of China's free trade agreement with ASEAN.

The ECFA has been compared with the Closer Economic Partnership Arrangements mainland China signed with the Special Administrative Regions: Hong Kong and Macau.

The deal is also structured to benefit Taiwan far more than mainland China. The "early harvest" list of tariff concessions covers 539 Taiwanese products and 267 mainland Chinese goods. The advantage to Taiwan would amount to US$13.8 billion, while mainland China would receive benefits estimated at US$2.86 billion. Mainland China will also open markets in 11 service sectors such as banking, securities, insurance, hospitals and accounting, while Taiwan agreed to offer wider access in seven areas, including banking and movies.

Financial reforms were kicked off on January 16, 2010, with the signing of three Memoranda of Understanding (MOU) between Taiwan's Financial Supervisory Commission Chairman Sean Chen and three counterpart agencies in Beijing for Banking, Insurance and Securities. The FSC is hoping that Taiwan will get more leniency in the hurdles set by the Chinese government for foreign players. These hurdles have limited the growth of these foreign players relative to their local peers.

== Signing and review ==
The negotiation process took place over several rounds. Substantive yet informal discussions regarding the ECFA initially took place during the 4th round of SEF-ARATS discussions in December 2009. During this time the delegates for China and Taiwan laid down the framework for the first round of ECFA talks which took place on January 26, 2010, in Beijing. Kao Koong-lian, secretary general and vice chairman of the Straits Exchange Foundation (SEF), led the 13 member Taiwanese delegation while Zheng Lizhong, Vice President of the Association for Relations Across the Taiwan Straits (ARATS), represented China's interests. Subsequent rounds of ECFA talks took place on March 31, 2010, in Taipei and June 13, 2010, in Beijing. The final agreement was signed during the 5th round of SEF-ARATS talks on June 29, 2010, in Chongqing. Chiang Pin-kung, the chairman of Taiwan's SEF represented Taiwan. Chen Yunlin, the President of ARATS, represented mainland China. Taiwan's Executive Yuan approved the ECFA on July 2, 2010 and the Legislative Yuan (parliament) approved the deal on August 17, meaning the deal became law on January 1, 2011. The ECFA came into effect on September 12, 2010.

== Response ==
=== Debate ===
ECFA was widely debated in Taiwan, in regards to potential effects on local Taiwanese businesses, as well as on how the government has presented it to the public. The opposition Democratic Progressive Party (DPP) and other pro–independence groups believe that the free trade agreement is a "cover" for unification with China by "inextricably linking" the two economies. According to Jie Huang of China Review, it is a means to maintain peace in cross-Strait relations and "ultimately to reach the goal of reunification." A debate was held and televised on April 25, 2010.

=== Referendum proposals ===
In 2010, the originally-from-China pan-blue-camp-controlled Referendum Review Committee several times rejected referendum proposals against Ma Ying-jeou administration's economic agreement with China even the numbers of petition forms for a referendum has been reached and nearly 200,000 signatures has been collected. The public opinion survey shows a majority of respondents opposed the signing of that package with China and many experts and politicians among protesters sees a referendum for this as essential.

=== Reception ===
There were some protests against the signing of the ECFA which would boost two-way trade organized by the Sunflower Student Movement, a popular movement that had the general support of, but was not led by, Taiwan's then-opposition Democratic Progressive Party. A spokesman for the DPP said the trade agreement with China could damage the local economy and undermine Taiwan's sovereignty as he was against the One China market concept. President Ma Ying-jeou responded that the signing would not lead to a One China market.

Many protesters accuse the agreement as eventually leading Taiwan towards unification with mainland China. The DPP claimed that 100,000 took part in the protest, while the police said there were about 32,000 people. The demonstration started at 3pm and ended by 7pm.

=== Clash in the legislature ===
On July 8, 2010, a Legislative Yuan meeting was held. The DPP insisted the ECFA agreement be reviewed article by article. That demand was rejected by the KMT caucus. A six-minute fight then broke out among the legislators. Wang Jin-pyng was at the podium surrounded by other KMT legislators. Liu Chien-kuo, Su Chen-ching (蘇震清) and Kuo Wen-chen (郭玟成) attempted to get to him and failed. Lawmakers threw paper, water and trash at each other. KMT legislator Wu Yu-sheng (吳育昇) was hit in the head by a clock. He had to be transported to National Taiwan University Hospital. A number of other people were involved in the scuffle. Two KMT legislators held DPP chairwoman Tsai Ing-wen responsible for the clash.

== See also ==
- Cross-Strait relations
- Cross-Strait Service Trade Agreement
- Political status of Taiwan
- Mainland and Hong Kong Closer Economic Partnership Arrangement (CEPA)
- Mainland and Macau Closer Economic Partnership Arrangement (CEPA)
