= Sepa language =

Sepa language may refer to:

- Sepa language (Papua New Guinea)
- Sepa language (Papua Province)
- Sepa language (Maluku)
