= Mainland and Hong Kong Closer Economic Partnership Arrangement =

Economic agreement

- Traditional Chinese: 內地與香港關於建立更緊密經貿關係的安排
- Simplified Chinese: 内地与香港关于建立更紧密经贸关系的安排
Transcriptions
Standard Mandarin
- Hanyu Pinyin: nèidì yú Xiānggǎng guānyú jiànlì gèng jǐnmì jìngmào guānxì de ānpái
Yue: Cantonese
- Jyutping: noi6 dei6 jyu3 hoeng1 gong2 gwaan1 jyu1 gin3 laap6 gang3 gan2 mat6 ging1 mau6 gwaan1 hai6 dik1 on1 paai4

Closer Economic Partnership Arrangement
- Traditional Chinese: 更緊密經貿關係的安排
- Simplified Chinese: 更紧密经贸关系的安排
Transcriptions
Standard Mandarin
- Hanyu Pinyin: gèng jǐnmì jìngmào guānxì
Yue: Cantonese
- Jyutping: gang3 gan2 mat6 ging1 mau6 gwaan1 hai6 dik1 on1 paai4

The Mainland and Hong Kong Closer Economic Partnership Arrangement, or Closer Economic Partnership Arrangement (CEPA) for short, is an economic agreement between the Government of the Hong Kong Special Administrative Region and the Central People's Government of the People's Republic of China, signed on 29 June 2003. A similar agreement, known as the Mainland and Macau Closer Economic Partnership Arrangement, was signed between the Government of the Macau Special Administrative Region and the Central People's Government on 18 October 2003.

Regular supplements have been signed between the Mainland and Hong Kong governments, including Supplement VIII (also referred to as CEPA VIII), which was signed on 13 December 2011 and implemented from 1 April 2012. The most recent supplement, Supplement X, was signed on 29 August 2013. The two agreements and additional supplements were signed in the Chinese language; the Chinese text is therefore the authoritative text. The Hong Kong government generally provides a courtesy English translation, as English is one of the official languages of Hong Kong. In the full name of "CEPA", the "Mainland" refers to the customs territory of the People's Republic of China.

On October 9, 2024, the Ministry of Commerce of China and the Hong Kong Special Administrative Region Government signed a revision of the CEPA Service Trade Agreement yesterday, further lowering or eliminating the entry threshold for Hong Kong service providers. At the same time, new arrangements such as "Hong Kong Capital, Hong Kong Law" and "Hong Kong Capital, Hong Kong Arbitration" were introduced in the pilot cities of the Greater Bay Area to facilitate Hong Kong investors. The revised agreement will officially take effect on March 1, 2025.

== Objectives ==
CEPA is a free trade agreement pursuant to which qualifying products, companies and residents of Hong Kong enjoy preferential access to the mainland Chinese market. Many of the preferences surpass the concessions made by China upon its accession to the World Trade Organization.

The CEPA document identifies the following objectives:

"To strengthen trade and investment cooperation between Mainland China and Hong Kong and promote joint development of the two sides, through the implementation of the following measures:

1. progressively reduce or eliminate tariffs and non-tariff barriers on substantially all the trade in goods between the two sides;
2. progressively achieve liberalization of trade in services through reduction or elimination of substantially all discriminatory measures;
3. promote trade and investment facilitation."

== See also ==
- Economic Cooperation Framework Agreement (ECFA)
- Economy of Hong Kong
- Mainland and Macau Closer Economic Partnership Arrangement
- Trade bloc
