= Sepa (priest) =

Ancient Egyptian priest

- Responsible for Royal Matters
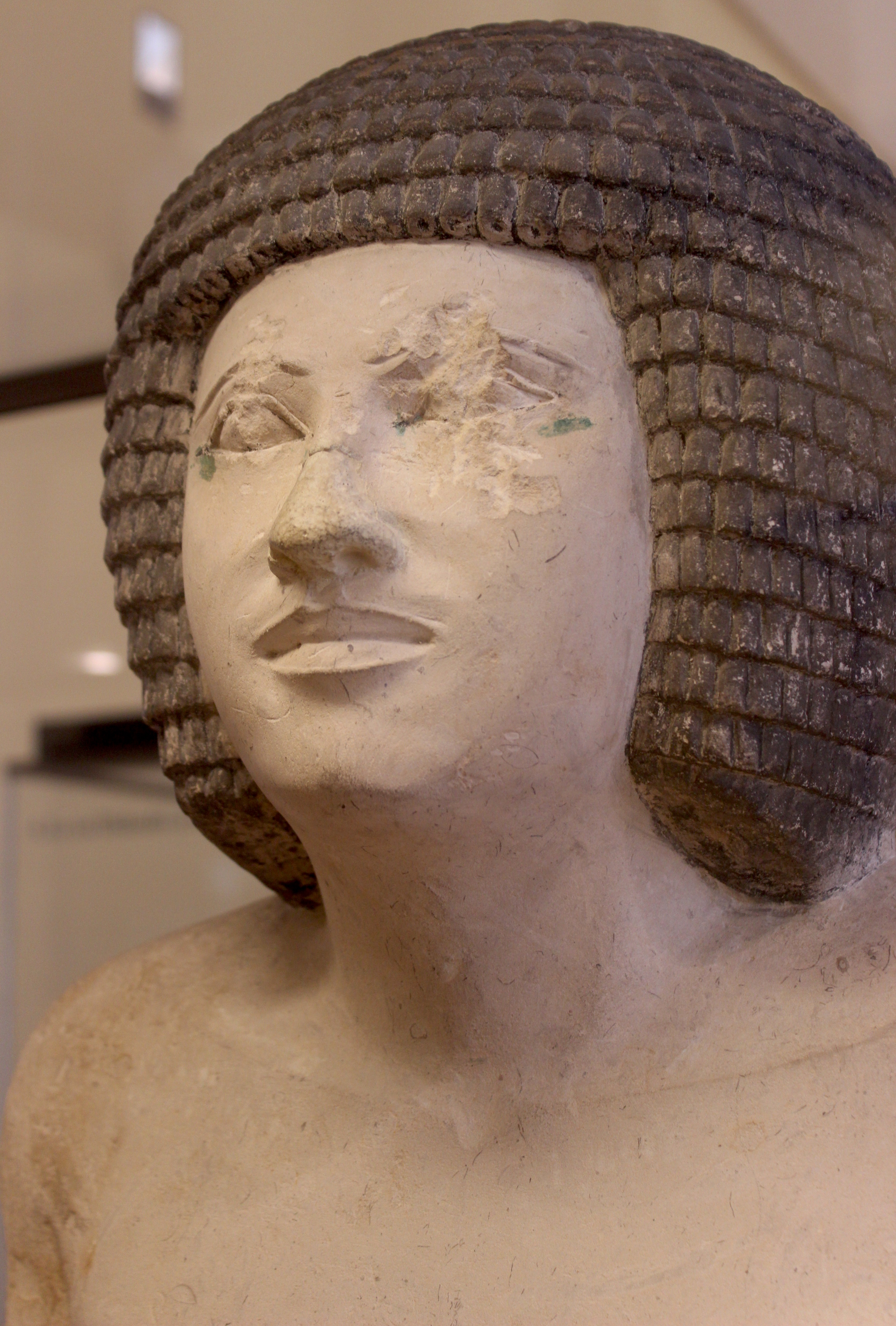
- Statue of Sepa, Louvre
- Burial: mastaba, Saqqara
- Spouse: Nesa

Sepa was an ancient Egyptian, who lived during the Third Dynasty.

Sepa was a priest and noble. His titles were "Responsible for Royal Matters", "Greatest of the ten of Upper Egypt", "Priest of the god Kherty" and "Herdsman of the White Bull".

Sepa's wife was Nesa, and she was buried with him at Saqqara in a mastaba. Two statues of him and one of his wife were found in their grave and are now in the Musée du Louvre in Paris. These statues are amongst the masterpieces of the art of the Old Kingdom.
