= CIPA =

CIPA, or variations, may stand for:

== Businesses and organizations ==
- Camera & Imaging Products Association, Japan-based organization
- Canadian International Pharmacy Association
- Chartered Institute of Patent Attorneys, United Kingdom body of patent attorneys
- China Investment Promotion Agency
- CIPA Heritage Documentation (Comité International de la Photogrammétrie Architecturale)
- CIPA-DT, a television station in Prince Albert, Saskatchewan, Canada
- Companies and Intellectual Property Authority, Botswana
- Cook Islands Progressive Association
- Cornell Institute for Public Affairs, at Cornell University
- Cyprus Investment Promotion Agency

== People ==
- Cipa Glazman Dichter, Brazilian concert pianist
- Cemil Çıpa (born 1988), Turkish race driver
- Larry Cipa (born 1951), U.S. American football player

== Other uses ==
- Children's Internet Protection Act, United States federal law
- Classified Information Procedures Act, United States federal law
- Congenital insensitivity to pain with anhidrosis, a rare neural disorder
- Cipa, a Polish profanity

== See also ==
- CEPA (disambiguation)
- SEPA (disambiguation)
- São Pedro da Cipa, Mato Grosso, Brazil
