= Mainland and Macau Closer Economic Partnership Arrangement =

2003 economic agreement

Chinese name
- Traditional Chinese: 內地與澳門關於建立更緊密經貿關係的安排
- Simplified Chinese: 内地与澳门关于建立更紧密经贸关系的安排
Transcriptions
Standard Mandarin
- Hanyu Pinyin: nèidì yú Aòmén guānyú jiànlì gèng jǐnmì jìngmào guānxì de ānpái
Yue: Cantonese
- Jyutping: noi6 dei6 jyu3 ou3 mun4*2 gwaan1 jyu1 gin3 laap6 geng3 gen2 mat6 ging1 mou6 gwaan1 hai6 dik1 on1 paai4

Short Chinese name
- Traditional Chinese: 更緊密經貿關係
- Simplified Chinese: 更紧密经贸关系
Transcriptions
Standard Mandarin
- Hanyu Pinyin: gèng jǐnmì jìngmào guānxì
Yue: Cantonese
- Jyutping: geng3 gen2 mat6 ging1 mou6 gwaan1 hai6

Portuguese name
- Portuguese: Acordo de Estreitamento das Relações Económicas e Comerciais entre o Continente Chinês e Macau

The Mainland and Macau Closer Economic Partnership Arrangement, or Closer Economic Partnership Arrangement (CEPA) for short, is an economic agreement between the Government of the Macau Special Administrative Region and the Central People's Government on October 18, 2003. A similar agreement, known as the Mainland and Hong Kong Closer Economic Partnership Arrangement, was signed between the Government of the Hong Kong Special Administrative Region and the Central People's Government of the People's Republic of China, signed on June 29, 2003.

Regular supplements with further liberalisations have been signed between the Mainland and Macau governments. The most recent, Supplement VIII (also referred to as CEPA VIII), was signed in December 2011 and enters into effect on 1 April 2012.

The two agreements and additional supplements were signed in the Chinese language. The Chinese text is therefore the authoritative text.

== General features ==
CEPA is a free trade agreement pursuant to which qualifying products, companies and residents of Macau enjoy preferential access to the mainland Chinese market. Many of the preferences surpass the concessions made by China upon its accession to the World Trade Organization.

Under CEPA VIII, 43 service sectors enjoy preferential access to the Mainland and all Macau products (that are permitted to be imported into China) are exempt from import duties.

== Objectives and implementation ==
CEPA is stated to have the following objectives:

"To strengthen trade and investment cooperation between Mainland China and Macau and promote joint development of the two sides, through the implementation of the following measures :

1. progressively reducing or eliminating tariffs and non-tariff barriers on substantially all the trade in goods between the two sides;
2. progressively achieving liberalization of trade in services through reduction or elimination of substantially all discriminatory measures;
3. promoting trade and investment facilitation."

The Annexes to CEPA elaborate measures to achieve these objectives and detail how products and service providers can qualify for the CEPA benefits, including:

1. Arrangement for Implementation of Zero Tariff for Trade in Goods (Annex 1);
2. Rules of Origin for Trade in Goods (Annex 2);
3. Procedures for the Issuing and Verification of Certificates of Origin (Annex 3);
4. Specific Commitments on Liberalization of Trade in Services (Annex 4);
5. Definition of “Service Supplier” and Related Requirements (Annex 5); and
6. Trade and Investment Facilitation (Annex 6).

== See also ==
- Economy of Macau
- Mainland and Hong Kong Closer Economic Partnership Arrangement
- Economic Cooperation Framework Agreement
