= Southern Interscholastic Press Association =

The Southern Interscholastic Press Association (SIPA) is a nonprofit organization whose purpose is to promote journalistic professionalism by public schools in the Southeast of the United States of America. The association was founded in 1926 at Washington and Lee University and moved to the University of South Carolina in 1972. Members of the association come from the states of Alabama, Arkansas, District of Columbia, Florida, Georgia, Kentucky, Louisiana, Maryland, Mississippi, North Carolina, Oklahoma, South Carolina, Tennessee, Texas, Virginia, and West Virginia.
