= Feminism in South Korea =

Feminism in South Korea is the origin and history of feminism or women's rights in South Korea.

In 2023, South Korea ranked 30th out of 177 countries on the Women, Peace and Security Index, which is based on 13 indicators of inclusion, justice, and security. In 2025, the United Nations Development Programme ranked South Korea 12th out of 172 countries on its Gender Development Index, making it the 2nd highest in Asia. The index measures education and living standards. In 2024, South Korea ranked 94th out of 146 countries in the World Economic Forum's Gender Gap Index, which evaluates gender-based gaps in education, welfare, employment, and political power.

Women's suffrage in South Korea was included in Article 11 of the national constitution in 1948, which states that "all citizens shall be equal before the law, and there shall be no discrimination in political, economic, social or cultural life on account of sex, religion or social status." The feminist or women's rights movement in South Korea is quite recent compared to first wave and second-wave feminism in the Western world.

== History ==
=== Confucianism ===
Due to its history of a monarchical government, strict hierarchical social divisions, and patriarchal family structure, Korean society has maintained social structures that justify unfair social treatment and distribution of unequal roles to men and women. At the center of this phenomenon, Confucianist ideologies still weigh heavily on people's minds. The Confucian tenet of filial piety requires women to obey men. One tenet about women's obedience translated as: "to the father when young; to the husband when married; and to the son in old age." This emphasizes the wife's obedience to the main male figure in her life. Combined with Confucianism's emphasis on relationships among people rather than individual freedom, gender discrimination was justified with this ideology, in which not only men but also women themselves recognize women's subordinate nature, consciously or not.

=== Japanese colonial period ===
The colonization of Korea by Japan led to the adoption of Japanese family laws. After the establishment of United States military rule in South Korea, most of the Japanese colonial legal system was left intact, and all legal documents remained effective unless especially repealed by a special ordinance. Family law cemented patriarchy in a legal sense by prioritizing male heirs in inheritance law, among other sexist policies. The process of decolonization caused a rift between those who were eager to dismantle all colonial structures of rule and those who associated these family structures with traditional Korean culture and did not want to cause disruptions in these structures.

=== Korean women's movement ===
The Korean women's movement started in the 1890s with the foundation of Chanyang-hoe, followed by many other groups, primarily focused on women's education and the abolition of gender segregation and other discriminatory practices.

When Korea became a Japanese colony in 1910, women's associations were banned by the Japanese and many women instead engaged in underground resistance groups such as the Yosong Aeguk Tongji-hoe (Patriotic Women's Society) and the Taehan Aeguk Buin-hoe (Korean Patriotic Women's Society). As a result, the role of women in society began to change.

Kim Ransa was an early Korean teacher known for her advocacy of women's empowerment through education. In response to a piece written by Yun Chi-ho in the journal The Korea Mission Field in July 1911 detailing the need for Korean women to learn how to do household chores, Kim published a rebuttal piece asserting that "the purpose of education for women is not to cook or sew better," and that "women students should not be blamed, with a lack of evidence, for not knowing how to do laundry or ironing.

After the end of the war and the partition of Korea in 1945, the Korean women's movement was split. In North Korea, all women's movements were channeled into the Korean Democratic Women's Union. In South Korea, the women's movement was united under the Korean National Council of Women in 1959, which in 1973 organized the women's group in the Pan-Women's Society for the Revision of the Family Law to revise the discriminatory Family Law of 1957, a cause that remained a focus for the rest of the 20th century and did not result in any major reform until 1991.

In the 21st century, the Korean women's movement in South Korea faced a change along with the fourth wave of feminism. In particular, from 2010 to 2020, women's social movements developed with legislative movements to change society through the enactment, amendment, and abolition of laws. In South Korea, a new paradigm of the women's movement began through the Abortion Crime Abolition Movement and the Me Too Movement.

In 1953, South Korea enacted a provision to punish women who have had abortions as a criminal law, completely prohibiting women from having abortions. Later, in 1973, the Mother and Child Health Act enacted a law specifying the reasons for allowing some abortions, saying that pregnant women within 24 weeks can have abortions with the consent of their spouses only for five reasons. However, even after the enactment of the law, abortion was not effectively enforced as a private culture provision, and in 2009, a private organization called the Pro-Life Medical Association led to the discourse on the right to life of the fetus and insisted on the effective execution of abortion. At the same time, on August 23, 2012, the Constitutional Court found that the abortion punishment clause under the criminal law was not unconstitutional, and the crime of abortion was revived.

About four years later, in May 2016, the murder of exit 10 of Gangnam Station caused controversy over hate crimes against women. As a result, a campaign to commemorate the victims began, and social awareness of misogyny and discourse on women's rights began to form. In September 2016, legislation was announced in connection with the amendment to the enforcement regulations of the Medical Law during the Park Geun Hye government. The amendment to the enforcement regulations and enforcement ordinances concerned administrative dispositions for medical personnel who performed abortions, and accordingly, the obstetricians and gynecologists declared a complete suspension of abortion surgery. After that, women's groups staged a 'black protest', and the bill was temporarily withdrawn. These black protests and the murder of exit 10 of Gangnam Station served as the catalyst, and offline rallies related to women's human rights began to be held in earnest in various parts of Korea, raising interest in abortion crimes.

After the inauguration of the Moon Jae In government, members of the Internet community and existing women's movement groups such as the Korean Women's Association began to launch a 'joint action to abolish the crime of abortion for all'. On September 30, 2017, women's organizations filed a national petition with the Blue House, and various women's organizations shouted the slogan "my body, my choice" offline. This social discourse has expanded to political discourse around the country.

In November 2017, Cheong Wa Dae mentioned a plan to partially legalize the abolition of abortion, which is the core content of the petition, while the Moon Jae In government mentioned a plan to abolish abortion, which is the core content of the petition. In addition, the administration answered that it is a neutral position and that it is the domain of the judiciary and legislature. In this situation, in the religious world, a structure in which the conservative and progressive Great Britain was largely opposed, such as a campaign to sign 1 million signatures against the abolition of the crime of abortion. Even within the administration, in March 2018, the Ministry of Gender Equality and Family submitted an unconstitutional opinion to the Constitutional Court, and the Ministry of Health and Welfare led a conservative position on the abolition of the crime of abortion and took opposite positions between ministries.

In this situation, in 2018, the post-Corset movement unfolded along with the Me Too Movement, and interest in women's rights increased. Soon after, on April 11, 2019, the Constitutional Court ruled against abortion under the criminal law on the grounds that it excessively infringed on women's right to self-determination.

At the same time, it asked the National Assembly to revise the criminal law by the end of 2020, and presented a specific alternative legislative framework. Since then, it has been expected that the ruling Democratic Party of Korea will occupy a majority of seats in 2020 South Korean legislative election, and that the progressive ruling party will play a big role in the alternative legislative process.

However, the eye examination and discussion did not proceed at the standing committee. Eventually, the criminal law was not revised until the end of 2020, and abortion crimes disappeared in South Korea. Furthermore, only the provisions for abortion under the criminal law have disappeared, and the provisions of the Maternal and Child Health Act still remain, so social movements to prepare alternatives to resolve the legal gap are continuing. Accordingly, discussions on reproductive rights gender policy and sex education are expanding in the political world.

The Me Too movement in Korea was influenced and developed with the Me Too movement that began in the United States. On October 19, 2016, allegations were revealed on SNS that webcomic writer Lee Ja-hye aided and abetted minors with the hashtag "sexual violence in 00". Since then, the damage of sexual crimes has been revealed in the cultural community through the hashtag.

On January 29, 2018, prosecutor Seo Ji-hyun appeared on the JTBC newsroom and revealed the sexual violence of Ahn Tae-geun, the former chief prosecutor, and the Me Too movement became known to the public in earnest. Numerous women in Korea joined the "#me too" movement, expanding feminism into Korean social discourse. This has led to the spread of the media, politics, culture, and school Me Too.

In the political world, the Me Too movement was developed toward progressive political parties, starting with the sexual violence case of Ahn Hee-jung, then governor of Chungnam. However, despite the revelation of the Me Too movement by former Governor of Chungnam Ahn Hee-jung, the Democratic Party, which belongs to former Chungnam Governor Ahn Hee-jung, won a landslide victory in 2018 South Korean local elections held in June, showing a difference from the pattern of the Me Too movement that took place nationwide in politics.

However, after the Me Too movement, various political parties advocated policies to "realize gender equality politics," and some political parties showed institutional changes, such as establishing a dedicated organization for gender or expanding the ratio of female candidates. In addition, the Ministry of Gender Equality and Family opened a "reporting center for victims of sexual harassment and sexual violence in the workplace." The Ministry of Education opened a "School Me Too" report center, and the Ministry of Culture, Sports and Tourism operates a sexual violence report center to strengthen the system within public institutions, and legislative and judicial institutions, including the administration, are also moving to reflect public opinion after the Me Too movement.

=== Women after South Korean independence ===
After the Japanese surrender in August 1945, the Korean peninsula was divided and South Korea was placed under American administration. In 1948, South Korea was established as an independent nation.

Initially after gaining independence, the nation suffered significant political and economic chaos, but in the 1960s the rapid economic growth of Korea caused traditional views of gender to be challenged. With vast economic growth through rapid industrialization and modernization, the roles of men and women had to be redefined. With the advent of democracy and capitalism, women started to do work in public spaces, participated in political activity (once their suffrage was legitimized in the 1948 Constitution), and gained more opportunities to pursue higher education including college and university degrees.

Even though access to education had improved, gender discrepancies manifested in more subtle ways. Gender discrimination was prevalent without any conscious questioning about its moral validity. Although women were no longer prohibited from doing economic activities, poor working conditions, low wages compared to those of male workers, and sexual harassment in the workplace discouraged women workers.

In a 2023 survey, 11% of women stated they had received unwanted sexual advances in the workplace, whereas just 3.4% of men said the same. Almost half of women reported that they had heard sexist comments from coworkers. The number of women who claimed that their colleagues had made inappropriate comments about their physical appearance was triple that of men.

== Economic and employment inequality ==
=== Types of employment ===
The opening up of higher education did not coincide with material changes in the roles and work done by women. Besides certain careers commonly pursued by women such as nursing or hairdressing, job opportunities were not equally given to women; especially to women in college or as university graduates. Women were consistently excluded from companies' and work sites' employment scope. According to a 2021 survey of over 21 million Korean workers, almost 2 in 3 working women were office clerks, caregivers, cashiers, cleaners, cooks, social workers, production workers, school teachers, or nurses.

Gender-based disparities in workers' rights and pay persist "despite an above-average level of female tertiary education", according to an analysis by the Peterson Institute for International Economics (PIIE). There have been more female students in higher education than men since 2009. In 2022, this figure was 76.6% for women compared with 70.3% for men. While South Korea had the highest rate of tertiary education among women of all OECD nations in 2018, they simultaneously ranked in the bottom 20% for female employment.

Following the 1997 Asian financial crisis, women were disproportionately given temporary, unstable jobs known as Korean: 비정규직; RR: bijeongkyujik which have fewer legal protections and are notoriously low-paid. As of 2022, half of working women hold bijeongkyujik jobs, whereas only 1 in 3 male workers hold such jobs, with an hourly wage of less than 70% of their male counterparts.

Out of 15,000 high-level executives at South Korea's 500 largest firms, just 2.7% are female. Only 0.5% of the CEOs of the top 1,000 companies are women who do not have familial ties to the company.

=== Wage gap ===
In 2023, the South Korean government's Ministry of Gender Equality and Family revealed that 60.0% of women aged 15–64 were employed, compared to 76.9% of men. The average wage per person across 370 companies was ₩57.55 million (US$42,938.92) for women and ₩78.06 million (US$58,241.74) for men, representing a gap of 26.3%.

In the OECD, a club of mostly rich countries, South Korea has the biggest gender pay gap. Women earn 31% less than men.

In a 2023 report by the World Bank on women in business, South Korea gained a perfect score for categories such as mobility, marriage, assets, and pensions, but scored just 25 out of 100 for the "pay" category. Only nine countries ranked lower than South Korea for women's pay, including Afghanistan, Azerbaijan, Egypt, and Syria.

In the banking industry, there is a disparity between men's and women's earnings, but the gap is gradually closing. At KEB Hana Bank, a male employee earned on average 1.53 times more than his female colleagues in 2019. By 2022, the difference had decreased by 10%. Shinhan Bank's gender gap shrank 20% in the same period.

=== Working mothers and low birth rates ===
Korea's low birth rate has been declared a national emergency. To maintain South Korea's population of 51 million people, the total fertility rate (i.e. the average number of babies a woman is expected to have in their lifetime) should be 2.1. In the third quarter of 2023, this number was just 0.7. The number of babies born in South Korea decreased by 11.5% between 2022 and 2023, with marriages falling by 8.2%. Some analysts have suggested that the lack of work-life balance, as well as the rising cost of children's education, has caused many couples to delay having kids. 2 out of 3 married women who stated they did not want to have kids did so "due to fear of their careers being disrupted (by childbirth)".

The Korea Development Institute (KDI) released a report in 2023 suggesting that the declining birth rate was connected to an increase in women's participation in the economy. It stated that the economic engagement of women aged 30–34 increased by 13% between 2017 and 2022. In the same period, the number of women aged 30–34 with children fell by 31%, with the ratio of women with more than one child decreasing from 22.9% to 13.6%.

Child-rearing in South Korea makes it extremely difficult for women to participate in the workforce, as they are still expected to be the child's primary caregiver. Research by the Peterson Institute for International Economics (PIIE) highlighted that women are expected to choose either a career or have a family, and how it is a struggle to sustain both. Figures show that in 2021, 3.24 million women were unemployed, with reasons for abstaining from work ranging from childcare (43.2%), marriage (27.4%), and pregnancy/childbirth (22.1%). The proportion of employed women with children under the age of 18 was reportedly 60% in 2023. The PIIE attributes this issue to long work hours—the highest of any OECD nation—coupled with a lack of flexibility for working parents.

Research by the Korean Peninsula Population Institute for Future (KPPIF) suggests that workplace culture can also impact someone's decision to have children. They reported that, of people who were satisfied with their workplace, 60% stated that they were planning to have children, compared to just 45% of those who were unsatisfied with their workplace.

Some companies have chosen to enforce changes to help improve the country's low birth rates. Hyundai Motor established a specialized task force to support workers struggling to conceive. The number of paid days an employee can take to undergo fertility treatments was increased from 3 to 5 days, and the company agreed to cover the costs of up to ₩1 million (US$746.11) per treatment.

In 2023, the Seoul Metropolitan Government announced it would invest ₩500 billion (US$373.06 million) into measures to support working families. In 2022, they introduced subsidies for parents undertaking fertility treatments. From 2024, Seoul Metropolitan Government workers with children aged 0 to 9 will be able to adjust their working hours to accommodate their childcare commitments. A representative from the Seoul Metropolitan Government stated that they hoped this change would inspire the private sector to follow suit.

==== Equal Employment Opportunity and Work–Family Balance Assistance Act ====
There have been some improvements to workers' rights to support working mothers. The act, first introduced in 2007, aimed to promote equality between men and women "by protecting motherhood, and by promoting the employment of women, but also to improving the quality of all the people's lives by assisting work-family balance of employees".

While the act made the discrimination of an employee based on gender, marriage, family, pregnancy, or childbirth illegal, it did not clearly define what exactly is considered "discrimination".

In 2023, the Supreme Court of South Korea pronounced that denying employment to a working parent who is unable to work public holidays or early hours is unlawful. The Supreme Court ruled that an employer has a "duty of care" to employees raising children 8 years or younger by adjusting their working hours to accommodate childcare commitments, citing Article 19-5 of the Equal Employment Opportunity and Work-Family Balance Assistance Act.

In addition, the same act dictates that businesses with more than 500 workers (or more than 300 female workers) must either pay childcare fees on behalf of their employees or set up daycare centers for their workers. However, some companies have chosen to accept an annual fine of up to ₩200 million (US$149,223) instead of supporting their employees. Twenty companies were fined in 2023 for failing to provide adequate childcare provisions. The CEO of fashion e-commerce company Musinsa told employees in an online meeting, "we will be penalized, but paying the fine costs less than running the centers". According to government statistics, 91.5% of 1,486 eligible companies met the requirement in 2022.

=== Examples of employment discrimination ===
==== Banks and hiring practices ====
Three of South Korea's top four banks faced charges for manipulating their hiring processes to favor men.

Three senior managers at KB Kookmin Bank were found to have forged the test scores of applicants to give the men better scores so that they could hire more men than women. The defendants argued they were simply "following social customs". They were given suspended sentences and KB Kookmin Bank was handed a small fine of ₩5 million (US$3,730.57).

KEB Hana Bank recruiters set a target of hiring 4 male employees for every 1 female employee in 2013. They exceeded their goal, with the actual ratio being closer to 5.5 males for every female. The Supreme Court fined the bank ₩5 million (US$3,730.57). Shinhan Card also came under fire for similar male:female ratio requirements, setting an objective of 7 male employees to 3 female employees, and received the same fine of ₩5 million (US$3,730.57).

In 2023, KEB Hana Bank was found to have unlawfully manipulated its recruitment processes again. Their CEO, Ham Young-joo, was sentenced to six months in prison with a suspended sentence of two years, along with ₩3 million (US$2,238.34) for discriminatory hiring practices.

==== 2018 CEO of government agency jailed ====
Park Gi-dong was jailed in 2018 for fabricating applicants' interview scores during his time as CEO of the Korea Gas Safety Corporation. Because he believed that "female employees would cause setbacks in work progress by taking maternity leave", he ordered employees to falsify scores to hire more men. The Supreme Court gave him a sentence of four years' incarceration and fined him ₩3 billion (US$2.24 million).

==== 2019 Seoul Metro discrimination case ====
In September 2019, the Korean Board of Audit and Inspection revealed that Seoul Metro, which is responsible for the South Korean capital's subway system, had manipulated the interview scores of potential train inspectors to hire more men in 2016. Six women had passed the test, but Seoul Metro falsified their results and rejected their applications. Only men were hired that year. Seoul Metro argued that they unlawfully changed the female applicants' scores because "it was a job that women couldn't take on". As a result, two officials were suspended.

==== 2022 workplace bullying ====
In September 2022, a 37-year-old woman who had worked at Korea's top tech firm, Naver, for over ten years committed suicide reportedly because of bullying she received as a consequence of returning from maternity leave. As a result, the Ministry of Labor has launched an inquiry into the company for alleged violations of the Labor Standard Act.

==== 2023 Hyundai changes employment practices ====
In 2023, Hyundai made changes to its policies regarding female workers.

The Korean conglomerate had always hired female employees indirectly through agencies as temporary workers (Korean: 비정규직; RR: bijeongkyujik) meaning they were paid less than their male coworkers, without the protections of a full-time employment contract. One employee stated that she was paid a monthly salary of ₩1.5 million (US$1,119.17) compared to the men on full-time contracts who earned roughly ₩2 million (US$1,492.23) for the same position. In July 2023, they directly hired 6 female technicians for the first time since the company was founded in 1967.

The proportion of female executives, managers, and engineers was just 6.4% in 2022. Only 2 out of the 12 directors on their board are women.

==== 2023 government inquiry launched ====
In November 2023, a post on an anonymous forum went viral in South Korea. The poster, who identified themselves as a hiring manager at a major real estate firm, wrote: "As a corporate recruiter, it's not like we exclude all women but if (the applicant) is from a women's college, we don't even read the resume". Within four days, the Labor Ministry received 2,800 reports made requesting an in-depth inquiry. The investigation has been launched and is yet to be concluded (as of January 2024).

==== 2023 state-run organisation refuses to hire women ====
Representatives of a waste disposal center in Yesan County, South Chungcheong Province, stated they cannot hire women due to the "unnecessary complications" it brings, despite council regulations declaring that anybody, regardless of gender, can be hired as long as they have lived in the area for over two years. The Yesan-gun council denounced the comments and announced they were investigating the matter. Those found guilty of gender-based discrimination in hiring processes can receive a small fine of up to ₩5 million (US$3,730.57)

== Social and political inequality ==
The political equality of women also demonstrated a disparity between what was written in law and their de facto lack of political representation and self-determination. In 1990, even though women's suffrage was officially included in the Constitution, the National Assembly of Korea was composed of only 6 women members out of 299 members serving there and had not appointed any female cabinet ministers up to that date. Unlike the idealistic statement of Article 11, clause 1 of the Constitution of the Republic of Korea which states that "all citizens are equal before the law and [that] there shall not be discrimination in political, economic, social, or culture life on account of sex, religion, or social status," substantial changes for women's fair participation in politics has not yet been achieved.

In 1997, the percentage of parliamentary representatives who were female was 3%. In 2021, this figure had grown to 19%.

Moreover, gender inequality issues are not discussed openly among members of the Korean society or are overlooked as small problems compared to other social issues such as the democratization of the government or human rights issues in Korea. Politically paralyzed, those who were involved and suffered from gender discrimination and gendered violence could not expect public solutions.

According to Soon-Hwa Sun, Christianity and the formation of sisterhood among women of the same classes helped women cope with sexism.

In 2021, 32,000 cases of sexual abuse were recorded, an increase of 8.9% compared to 2020.

In 2001, the cabinet-level Ministry of Gender Equality was established (later reorganized into the Ministry of Gender Equality & Family) which signified the South Korean government was willing to cooperate with the women's movement.

=== Election of Park Geun-hye ===
In 2012, South Korea elected its first ever female President, Park Geun-hye of the conservative Liberty Korea Party. When she was elected, Korea was ranked 108 of 136 nations in the Gender Gap Index, below China, Russia, the United Arab Emirates, and Burkina Faso.

Her father Park Chung Hee conducted a military coup in 1961 and ruled the country for 18 years, with a legacy of economic transformation marred by human rights abuses. After her mother was assassinated in 1974, Geun-hye served as the de facto first lady for five years.

When she was elected President decades later, some analysts argued that the Korean public did not vote for her because of her gender, but due to her status as her "father's daughter". Park also received criticism from the opposition party because, as an unmarried and childless woman, she was perceived as betraying her womanly duty to serve her husband and raise children by instead pursuing a career in politics. The New York Times expressed doubt that the election of a female President would bring about significant changes because in South Korea, "women's most important job is still considered to be raising children".

Seungsook Moon, Professor of Sociology at Vassar College, argued that Park's election was not a momentous victory for women in the political sphere. She highlighted the irony of Park's position, similar to that of Margaret Thatcher, whereby women lead "conservative or leftist parties that have rarely prioritized or supported gender equality in their policy making and implementation", which she termed "window-dressing".

While Park was impeached after a corruption scandal and did not make significant progress towards feminist policies, she may have still contributed to the South Korean feminist movement. Her presence as a female head of state could act as a symbol to other women, inspiring them to see themselves as leaders as well as challenging stereotypes about women's political capabilities.

== Minjung Undong ==
While there are women's rights groups today in South Korea that were founded before the Second World War and post-1945, most of these groups did not focus solely on women's rights until the mid-1980s. The contemporary feminist movement in South Korea today can be traced back to the minjung undong or mass people's movement of South Korea. As the minjung movement grew, so did the focus on women's rights. The exploitation of women's labor in factories during South Korea's “economic miracle” gave the minjung movement a women's issue to focus on. The core of the minjung movement was thought to be poor rural and urban women. In the 1970s, the feminist movement in Korea was influenced by the women's movement in the Western world, particularly in the United States. However, in the 1980s, the birth of radical women's organizations began to resist American feminist influence by concentrating on broad human rights issues and reunification instead of gender equality.

The minjung undong movement began as a response to Japanese colonialism of South Korea and subsequently continued from 1961 to 1992. The movement fought for the freedom of the oppressed labor forces of Korea and was championed by students, workers, peasants, and intellectuals. At the same time, minjung feminism grew from this movement. During the years 1961 to 1979 of General Park Chung Hee's regime, women factory workers in South Korea, or yo' kong, were girls from the countryside who worked in factories for electronics, textiles, garments, plastics, and food processing. They suffered from poor working conditions, such as living in dormitories where mattresses were shared between two shifts of workers and working in factories where a single floor was divided into two. They were also paid low wages and were sexually harassed. During this period, the work done by the oppressed labor forces built the foundation for South Korea's later economic development. This period gave South Korea the reputation for having "the world's longest work week and [the] highest rate of industrial accidents". For the first time in South Korean history in 1972, a woman was elected as president of the democratic union movement and kept the movement going for six more years before it was finally shut down by the government. The Garment Makers Union or Chunggye Pibok Union represented 20,000 women working at Seoul's Peace Market until it was also shut down in the 1980s by General Chun Doo Hwan. South Korea's first female diplomat Hong Sook-ja entered the 1987 election, becoming the first female presidential candidate.

By the mid-1980s, the women's movement gained traction thanks to female involvement in the labor and student movements. The 1980s was a period of political turmoil and reform in South Korea. The Institute of Women's Research was created at Ewha University which was the first university for women in South Korea. In 1985, there was a national women's rally with the theme "Women's Movement in Unity with National Democratic Minjung Movement". Then in 1986, spurred by the rape and torture of female labor organizer Kwon In Suk by the hands of police in Buchon, women rallied together to form The Korean Women's Associations United (KWAU) which was made up of 33 different organizations (peasant, religious, environmental). KWAU's participation in protests eventually forced General Chun Doo Hwan to step down whose successor then implemented direct presidential elections.

By 1987, women made up 55% of the paid workforce. The service industry had the highest percentage of women (60%) compared to manufacturing (40%) and office workers (38%). However, sex worker jobs made up 30% of women employed in the service industry. The Korean Women Workers Association (KWWA) was formed in 1987 in response to gender discrimination in the workforce and fights for gender equality in South Korea. It was essential in continuing the fight for women's rights following democratic and political reform in South Korea. Even now, the KWWA fights for an 8-hour workday, higher wages, maternity protection, an end to sexual discrimination in the workplace, and an end to sexual violence against women in Korea. Chapters of the KWWA are in Seoul, Pusan, Buchon, Inchon, Changwon-Masan, and Kwangju. In response to workplace discrimination, the Korean Women's Association for Democracy and Sisterhood was founded by women office workers. These female workers fought against both the pay gap and sexist errands (such as carrying coffee and getting cigarettes for their male coworkers and superiors).

Other issues for women workers in South Korea include the harsh reality of precarious and irregular work. One company that pushed irregular work was KORAIL, which used third-party companies to hire irregular workers, allowed the sexual harassment of female workers, and employed discriminatory hiring tactics, which women became the target of. To support women who experienced the drawbacks of irregular work, unions such as the Korean Women's Trade Union (KWTU) and Korean Solidarity Against Precarious Work (KSPW) grew. Significant protests and demonstrations came out of the KTX train attendants' fight for equality and better treatment, which resulted in many of them getting fired, but as of 2018, they have been re-hired. Women also experienced discrimination from majority male unions, which reaffirmed the need for women to have unions and organizations that center their needs.

The minjung feminist movement was vital in bringing to light the crimes committed against women in and by the military. It established support groups for surviving comfort women (women who were coerced into sex work for the Japanese military during WWII). Comfort women survivors in Korea and other countries such as the Philippines, Taiwan, and other Japanese colonial holdings banded together with the Korean Council, the Korean Sexual Violence Relief Center, and the Korean Women's Associations United to submit testimony to the Human Rights Commission of the United Nations in 1993. Their testimony also included their demands to end violence against women committed in the military and during the war. By focusing on comfort women, cultural anthropologist Sealing Cheng argues that the women's movement sought to frame "prostitution as a foreign evil [...] incompatible with authentic Korean values." One legislative result of this campaign was the 2004 Anti-prostitution Laws. Cheng argues that these laws, which were opposed by sex workers, reinforced "the whore/wife binary by criminalizing women who sell sex uncoerced."

== Direction of feminist activities ==
There are significant differences between the "reformist" and "radical" feminist movements.

Reformist feminist movements in South Korea concentrate on changing women's roles in society. These movements are more similar to mainstream feminist movements in America. Their methods include lobbying, influencing decision makers, and drafting legislation. They are usually in support of the government of South Korea. These groups are said to be more mainstream and are made up of women from the middle-class who speak both Korean and English. Most of these groups are affiliated with the Council of Korean Women's Organizations (CKWO).

Other mainstream reformist organizations include:

- Young Women's Christian Association (YWCA), established in 1922
- Korean Center for Family Law, established in 1954
- Business and Professional Women (BPW)
- Korean Association of University Women (KAUW)
- Korean National Mother's Association (KNMA), established in 1958 and has about 40,000-50,000 members
- Korean Federation of Housewives' Clubs (KFHC), established in 1963 and has about 180,000 members.
- The Progressive Party actively supports the feminist movement in South Korea.

KNMA and KFHC support changes in the Family Law and the Equal Employment Opportunity Act. The Equal Employment Opportunity Act was passed in April 1988 and includes equality for women in job placement, promotions, retirement, job training, and compensation for maternity leave. Radical groups have criticized the law by stating that it does not have a "mechanism for implementation". Reformist groups have referred to the act as a first step and a sign of encouragement for reforms to come. The efforts of reformist groups to change the Family Law of South Korea culminated in the change in child custody arrangements in 1991. The rule that children always had to enter the father's custody after divorce was changed. The inheritance system was also changed to all children sharing equally in inheritance regardless of gender.

Radical feminist movements in South Korea focus on women's rights as human rights. Many of these groups were formed during the late 1980s, as opposed to the older reformist groups. They focus on issues such as reunification with North Korea and the prevention of torture of prisoners. The term "radical" does not refer to support for radical changes in women's roles. Their methods include strikes, marches, and public demonstrations. It can be argued that the word 'radical' is used because of the context of Korean society, which is far more oppressive and conservative than Western society. The radical groups are also younger than the reformist groups and are made up of often well-educated, middle-class women who prefer to speak only Korean. They usually affiliate with the KWAU.

Examples of radical organizations are:

- Women's Society for Democracy (WSD), established in 1987
- Women's Hotline established in 1983
- Women's Newspaper established in 1986
- Korean Women's Worker Association
- Korean Catholic Farmers
- Women's Party
- the 4B movement

The Women's Society for Democracy believes that human rights issues take precedence over issues of sexual equality. The Women's Hotline organization in Seoul addresses rape, prostitution, workplace discrimination, and domestic abuse. The radical women's rights groups criticized the Equal Employment Opportunity Act passed in 1988.

Radical feminism in South Korea has been viewed to have a notable transphobic and homophobic (against male homosexuals) presence, with internal dispute about the acceptability of such beliefs.

An important organization that is not affiliated with either the reformist or radical groups in South Korea is the Korean League of Women Voters. Recently, its activities have increased voter participation among women.

The terms reformist and radical are, at most, general classifications of the feminist movements in South Korea. Sharp divides exist along socialism and Marxist ideologies as well as stances towards migrant rights and transgender inclusion. Social feminists in South Korea concentrate on the effects of the patriarchy and the gender issues women face. They have a strong influence on women's studies in South Korea today. In contrast, Marxist feminists focus on the class divide and concentrate more on labor issues. Both socialist feminist and Marxist feminist organizations have combined to form the Alternative Culture and Research Center for Korean Women's Studies.

== Online feminist movements ==
Since the 1990s, Korean society has become highly digitized—95.1% of the population uses the internet. After the moderate gains made by Korean feminist movements in the 1990s and early 2000s, there was a major online backlash by men against their perceived loss of status. Users on internet forums such as DC Inside and ILBE coined derogatory terms such as "bean paste girl" (Korean: 된장녀; RR: doenjangnyeo) to describe negative stereotypes about modern Korean women. The term "bean paste girl" describes a young, college-aged woman who eats cheap meals to save money for things like Starbucks, which are seen as symbols of sophistication and Westernization. Misogynist neologisms such as bean paste girl and Boseulachi became normalized online and even spread to Korean mass media. For example, a large part of the popular song "Gangnam Style" parodied the stereotypes of the "bean paste girl". Scholars Donna Do-own Kim and Minseok Yoo argue that these misogynist stereotypes pressured Korean women to "continuously police and prove themselves" to avoid being labeled as selfish, materialistic, or undesirable. The rise of online misogyny inspired several online feminist movements starting in 2015.

=== Megalia ===
The first major online feminist movement in South Korea was Megalia, which started in May and June 2015 on the popular internet forum DC Inside. Female trolls occupied a forum page dedicated to sharing news about the Middle East respiratory syndrome (MERS) outbreak, where users had been blaming two Korean women for helping spread the disease. The trolls began "mirroring" the misogynist language used against Korean women but with the gender roles reversed. Initially, their goal was "to provoke and irritate young Korean men" who had spent years "ridiculing, denigrating, and bullying" Korean women online, but the movement quickly gained a self-consciously feminist identity. When moderators on DC Inside banned the "Megalians" for derogatory language (while allowing the original misogynist posts to remain) the movement moved to other parts of the Korean internet. The most popular places for Megalians became a Facebook group called "Megalia 4" and an independent website called Megalian.com. Although many feminist observers praised the Megalia movement for revitalizing feminism in South Korea—in 2016, a quarter of young Korean feminists credited Megalia for turning them into feminists—the movement proved extremely controversial in mainstream South Korean society. The strategy of "mirroring" misogynist posts (often meant to provoke outrage or laughter at men's expense) led many Koreans to label Megalia as a misandrist platform. Korean media accused Megalia of being as extreme as the far-right forum houseILBE and blamed the movement for encouraging hatred towards the opposite sex. The legacy of Megalia remains controversial. Some feminists now distanced themselves from Megalia, while other feminists and feminist researchers have praised them, as it was Megalia that ended the pervasive misogyny within Korean culture.

=== WOMAD ===
In December 2015, a debate emerged on the Megalia website over whether homophobic posts directed at gay men married to women were acceptable. The moderators of the website eventually banned this type of post, leading a group of users to leave and found the website WOMAD. Throughout 2016 and 2017, users gradually abandoned the Megalia website and Facebook group, moving to a myriad of other websites including WOMAD. In contrast to Megalia, the feminist movement based around WOMAD took a much more aggressive approach to mirroring and internet trolling. Some WOMAD users have shown extreme hatred towards gay and transgender people, leading WOMAD to be called "Korean-style TERFs". The website contributed to the rising tide of anti-feminist backlash that began against Megalia, although WOMAD itself denies being a feminist group.

== Radical feminism in South Korea ==
As of 2018, the rise of Korean radical feminism can be characterized by several key incidents in Korean feminist history, starting from the perpetual debate between Korean men who claim to be suffering from sexism due to Korea's mandatory military service for males, to the recent acquittal of a rising political star against sexual harassment allegations which was widely regarded to have dealt a significant blow against the country's #MeToo movement. Most recently, there have been several radical feminist demonstrations against misogynistic practices. The most prominent of these are the widespread use of spy cams in women's bathrooms and the Escape the Corset movement. The "Escape the Corset" or "Free the Corset" movement consists of mainly women who seek to challenge the high beauty standards in South Korean society. To protest the beauty standards they consider damaging, South Korean women choose to boycott makeup, hair dye and cosmetic procedures, a billion-dollar industry in the country. These demonstrations have received a large amount of support, where tens of thousands of young Korean women have come out to protest the unfair treatment of women and the biased standards against women.

The most recent, the Hyehwa Station Protest in October 2018, was the fifth such group protest against spy cameras and gender specific crimes. The protests were sparked after a woman was arrested for secretly photographing and doxing a male nude model following a dispute between them during a Hongik University art class. Activists alleged the investigation proved there were double standards in the National Police Agency, arguing that police only made a quick investigation and arrest because the victim was a male and the perpetrator was a female. It was discovered that the perpetrator had sent an email to the Womad administrator asking for the destruction of evidence, and later confessed, making the arrest fairly quicker. These demonstrations were characterized by the youthfulness of the crowd as well as their tendency to practice, limiting those who were able to join in the movement to women who were assigned female at birth, but including trans men. These tactics have been met with mixed feelings, with one male reporter stating "I could not be there to interview anyone although I am sympathetic to the cause". In addition, President Moon Jae-in stated during a July 2018 cabinet meeting that "Things like this bitterness among women will only be resolved when we are able to make them feel that we are especially respectful of the senses of shame and dignity associated with women's sexuality." Many women have since argued that President Moon is incapable of addressing the issue of misogyny if he continues to regard women's demonstrations as an expression of "bitterness." fueling an already divisive subject. Controversy arose over the slogans used by protesters, interpreted by many as misandry. For example, at the third rally, the phrase "Policemen are men-sects too" was chanted, referring to men as insects. The organizers of the rally told reporters they were "mirroring the language used by men against women" and that their movement was not intended to be against men. Controversy also arose over the phrase "do a Jae-gi" used by some protesters, referring to Sung Jae-gi, a men's rights activist who committed suicide by jumping off a bridge on 26 July 2013. Many of the instances of the phrase at the protests were directed toward President Moon. Some men's rights activist groups have started counter-protests of their own, advocating "guilty until proven innocent," and "release 10 criminals rather than charging one innocent man."

One of the largest incidents that brought the radical feminist movement to a head was an incident at a women's bathroom near Gangnam station in 2016. A man had been hiding in a women's bathroom and laid in wait for hours for a woman to come in with the express purpose of killing whoever came in. He has publicly admitted that he had specifically killed her because he hated all women for "belittling him". However, Korean police at the time treated the case as an isolated incident caused by a mentally unstable man. This sparked outrage and controversy throughout Seoul, as thousands of women congregated around the area to mourn the victim and the lack of response from the police. Simultaneous "men's rights" demonstrators arrived as counter-protestors, stating that more men died than women due to military service. This was epitomized by the 'pink elephant incident', where a man wearing a pink elephant body suit argued against 'reverse sexism', stating that the Disney movie Zootopia was a movie about reverse sexism. While he was booed out of the demonstration, men's rights groups took video footage of this incident and came up with the cry "stop violence against men." Zootopia director Byron Howard has since publicly tweeted that Zootopia was never intended to promote hatred or "used as a political statement in support of misogyny". This incident triggered a nationwide debate on whether mental illness or deep-rooted misogyny was to blame for crimes targeting women, and served as a trigger for several women to join the #MeToo movement in support of women who had suffered from misogynistic crimes.

In 2020, a trans woman withdrew her admission to Sookmyung Women's University College of Law after opposition was voiced by radical feminist groups at twenty-one organizations belonging to six women's colleges in the Seoul area.

== Criticism ==
=== Misandristic hate-speech by online-feminists ===
In South Korea, misandristic tendencies are centered around online feminists and women's (or female-dominated) online communities (e.g., Megalia, WOMAD, Yeoseong-Shidae) that are favorable to them.

According to a JTBC report from January 2016, an analysis of 52 million online posts over the past two years at the time of the report revealed that misandristic posts (19.6%) were 1.9 times more numerous than misogynistic posts (10.4%). The communities with the most sexist expressions were Ilbe Storehouse in first place, Nate Pann in second, WOMAD in third, and Megalia in fourth, with the 2nd to 4th places being women online communities, according to a survey by the Korean Institute for Gender Equality Promotion and Education in December 2016.

As a result, Megalia's logo is perceived as a symbol of misandry, resulting in the finger pinching conspiracy theory. This is becoming one of the causes of gender conflicts between men and women occurring primarily online in South Korea.

In addition, in female-dominated online communities in South Korea, there is a tendency to defend perpetrators and mock victims in cases where the victim is male.

=== Transphobia ===
South Korea has poor human rights protections and social treatment for transgender people. Amidst this, TERF tendencies that reject transgender people are emerging, centered around young South Korean feminists.

TERF ideology is becoming a dominant tendency among South Korean young feminists, resulting in exclusion and hostility towards trans women.

A representative example is the case involving opposition to the admission of a transgender person at Sookmyung Women's University. This is because many TERFists among Sookmyung Women's University students opposed the transgender student's admission and pressured her. Due to this incident, the transgender person gave up her admission.

=== Advocacy for cultural censorship ===
Mainstream feminism in South Korea leans towards anti-pornography feminism. As a result, mainstream feminists in South Korea advocate for the indiscriminate suppression of erotic content, including pornography. The 2024 adult festival "KXF The Fashion" was opposed by South Korean feminists due to its alleged objectification of women, labeled a "sexual assault" by the Suwon Women's Organization Network. Strong criticism from other organizations resulted in the cancellation of the festival.

These claims have been criticized for equating pornography with sexual crimes and violence against women. Chun Ha-ram, a member of the National Assembly from the Reform Party, criticized the behavior of women's groups and mainstream South Korean feminists, saying, "A strange criteria has been applied that justifies women's instincts while degrading men's instincts", and "Gender equality is a standard that should be applied equally to both men and women." He also argued that the ban on porn festivals should be reconsidered.

==== Sexual objectification ====
South Korean feminists argue that sexual objectification leads to sexism and sexual crimes. The primary criticisms of this claim are that it restricts the definition of sexual commodification or sexual objectification to an extreme interpretation; that the claims of objectification leading to sexual crimes are weakly supported, with studies contradicting it; that it equates voluntary sexual objectification with a crime; and that, except for South Korea, developed countries have legalized explicit strip shows and pornography. One critic, Lim Young-seok, wrote "The globally popular K-pop industry is a successful example of sexual commodification," and "While the sexual culture industry has its dark sides, those aspects need to be addressed. Treating the entire industry as a prelude to a crime is an oversimplification and a leap of imagination."

== Attitudes towards feminism in contemporary South Korea ==
Many scholars have noted a surge of in interest in feminism throughout South Korean society over recent years. This surge is often referred to as the ‘feminism reboot’. Both the Korean MeToo movement and the Gangnam murder case have been accredited with playing an important role in catalyzing the growth of interest towards feminism within South Korea. The Gangnam Station Post-it Note protest was organized following the Gangnam murder case, where a young woman was murdered by a man in a public bathroom close to Gangnam station, which the killer says came from feeling mistreated by women in general. In this protest, anonymous protesters covered Gangnam station with Post-it notes with affirming feminist messages and chrysanthemum flowers. This gave women a space to speak out against the misogyny and high rates of violence against women that remain prevalent in South Korean society. The #MeToo movement, ignited in January 2018 with the initial accusation made by Suh Ji-Hyeon, inspiring many women to come forward about their personal experiences with sexual harassment and violence. Although through these events some people began to receive feminism more positively, others continued to oppose the feminist movement and the voices that came forward in response to the MeToo movement, under the belief that women are no longer being discriminated against.

Despite feminism gaining more interest amongst the public over recent years, it is clear that there is still a lack of support for the feminist movement throughout South Korea. Many continue to label feminists, and the actions of such young women, as 'pathological' or 'crazy'. In addition, scholars have also suggested that feminism continues to be synonymous with female chauvinism and 'man-hating' within South Korea.

South Korean radical feminist online communities, such as Womad and Megalia, have undoubtedly played a role in forming such perceptions of feminism. Womad, a particularly infamous radical feminist site, has been claimed to be "the strongest and most extreme route of South Korean feminism". Discourses on these sites have often been criticized for their posts which mock and revile men and claims of committing various crimes, e.g., the abortion of a male baby. Lee Na-mi, a researcher at a psychological analysis center, during an interview, made clear her worries about how such discourses could result in the South Korean feminist movement being distorted or perceived wrongly. San E, a famous Korean rapper, has often publicly expressed such perceptions of feminism, for example, he claimed that "Womad is poison. Feminist, no. You're a mental illness" at a concert.

Hostility towards feminism has often resulted in many South Korean celebrities being met with backlash for expressing even the smallest amount of support for the feminist movement. Red Velvet member, Irene, was flooded with comments and messages across social media from angry fans after expressing that she had read the feminist novel, Kim Ji Young, Born 1982. Popular Korean actress, Moon Ga-young, has also received large amounts of backlash for speaking out about feminism and criticizing incidents of misogyny in Korean society. More recently, a member of the South Korean Olympic archery team, An San, suffered extreme backlash because of claims that she must be a feminist, based on her short hair and the fact that she attends a women's-only college. These incidents of hostility towards even the slightest association with feminism show the prevalence of negative attitudes towards the feminist movement within South Korean society.

=== Antifeminism ===
Disgruntled young men have become vocal critics of feminism and feminist women who speak out in public in the recent years. Yoon Suk-yeol narrowly won South Korea's 2022 presidential election. During his run for presidency, he called for the Ministry of Gender Equality and Family to be abolished, and accused its officials of treating men like "potential sex criminals." Yoon also said that he doesn't think systemic structural discrimination based on gender exists in South Korea. Due to the various methods of calculating and measuring gender inequality, South Korea's gender inequality rankings vary across different reports. In 2023, South Korea ranked 30th out of 177 countries on the Women, Peace and Security Index, which is based on 13 indicators of inclusion, justice, and security. In 2023, South Korea has ranked 20th out of 193 countries on the Human Development Index (HDI). In 2025, it ranked 12th out of 172 countries on Gender Inequality Index(GII), making the country the 2nd least gender unequal state in Asia. On the other hand, South Korea ranked low on Global Gender Gap Report, placing 99th out of 146 in 2022, leading to criticism of having deep gender inequalities.

Hwang argued that despite decades of anti-discriminatory gender policies and better education for women, there is persistent discrimination of gender in workplaces in South Korea. He explained that the reasons for this is due to the lack of legal and inefficient enforcement of the gender-based policies. He described the punishment for gender-based crimes to be weak, and argued that the culture of South Korea typically favors male dominance which influences the organizational structure of workplaces and boosts societal pressures for women. Hwang claimed that driven by public anger and media coverage, South Korea has seen a boost in actions against sex crimes since the mid-2000s. South Korean K-WomenLink has advocated for systems to support the survivors of sexual violence whilst highlighting the deficiencies in the system. Hwang also argued that Cases with high influence of victim-blaming, flawed procedures, moreover cases involving individuals (perpetrators) in high social positions were challenged by the organization.

There has been a hashtag, that was popular on Twitter in South Korea "#iamafeminist" which normalized the term "feminism", in a society where it was once unacceptable. This hashtag facilitated feminist activism and played a role against misogyny, where identification as a feminist is often stigmatized. The expression of feminist identity was utilized through this hashtag, and people started to discuss their personal experiences that were related to gender inequality. The hashtag was used for a variety of issues, where not only feminists and activists, but also ordinary individuals shared their hardships on housework, equal pay, sexual harassment, etc.

=== Stagnation of feminism in Korea ===
The proportion of women in their 20s who consider themselves feminists decreased from 41.7% in 2021 to 31.3% in 2023.

In 2022, 53.2% of women said that their interest in feminism had decreased because they felt tired of it.

Since the mid-2010s, female student councils at universities have been abolished because of the conflict over feminism, and in 2022, there are only four female student councils in Seoul, but these are also inactive.

Sales of feminist books have been decreasing since 2018.

In 2019, 72% of men in their 20s responded that it would be better to break up with their girlfriend if she is a feminist.

In 2022, 40% of teenage male students answered that feminism is misandrist, and 27.8% answered that feminism is female supremacy.

In 2022, 56.8% of male university students answered that feminism is misandrist, and 21.6% answered that feminism is female supremacy.

In 2022, feminist is being used as an insult term.

In 2023, men ranked feminism as the number one thing marriage partners need to fix.

In 2023, 83.4% of men born around 2002 responded that they would not like a feminist spouse.

In 2023, men ranked feminists as the number one thing they disliked in remarriage partners.

In 2023, Yonsei University's feminism club was abolished because there were no new members.

In 2024, 38.6% of feminists responded that they had quit feminist activities.

== Feminist law reforms ==
As South Korea democratized after the partition of Korea, the range of women's activity in public space broadened. However, the social status of women was neglected and the equal political status of women was not fully affirmed by law. South Korean women experienced resistance through the devaluation of women's activities and legal positions. Generally, while Korean women realized how poorly they had been treated under the Confucian familial and societal system, Korean women were especially in need during this period of democratization because of their diminished influence on family politics, property rights, and child custody. To achieve this equity, women's rights movements called on the government to rewrite family law.

=== Family law ===
After the colonial occupation of Korea by Japan ended, decolonization and reform of the Korean legal system, and in particular the colonial laws surrounding family structure, were a topic of intense debate. The debate around family law became the locus of larger issues around the definition of "Korean-ness" and the disentanglement of the colonizer and the colonized.

The 1948 Korean Constitution's family law depended on the Confucian belief that the family head, who is the oldest male member of the family, has the authority to rule his family and family members. The authorities given to the family head included child custody, which was exclusively rewarded to men, full property ownership after divorce, and the ability to sustain his family kinship lineage (patrilineality) and surname, while the female family line, matrilineality, was not legally recognized. Under this system, married women were considered members of their husband's family and no longer members of their birth family. The eldest male heir was also expressly given priority in inheritance. Conservative politicians such as Chief Justice of the Supreme Court of Korea Kim Byung-ro argued that patrilineality was the essence of a family. He viewed children as pre-formed entities produced by males which were incubated by a female womb. This justified patriarchy and patrilineal family structures which required women to be controlled by male authority; under this viewpoint, marriage is an exchange by a male family head of a daughter to another male family head, to become her new family's daughter-in-law/wife/mother and produce male heirs. To Chief Justice Kim, gender equality as defined in the Constitution was a fundamentally foreign idea, and the reformation of family relations would lead to the disruption of authentic "Korean-ness." This led to the colonial family head structure being largely preserved for several years after the 1948 Constitution was written into law.

With these laws, women went through severe legal hardships in the absence of a husband or male family member in the case of divorce, remarriage, etc. Women also suffered financial hardship due to this discrimination in inheritance law and property division during divorce. Feminists made numerous attempts to reform family law, which led to slow but persistent change over time. By 1962, the first revision of family law was made. The traditional extended family could now be separated and re-arranged as a new family with fewer members with their rights to decide where to live and work. Although it did not directly have a positive effect on women's equality, the revision showed that family structures could be changed, and allowed room in the political discourse for further reforms. In the following revisions in 1977 and 1989, substantial changes were made and approved by law. Since the 1989 revision, property division upon divorce and succession prioritizing males was prohibited; parental rights were fairly shared by mother and father, and granted the right to meet the children after divorce.

Exogamy law (dongsung dongpon) under Article 809 of the Korean Civil Code banned marriage of people in the same clan, which limited women's freedom to create or re-create social relationships under law, such as in the case of remarriage or adoption. This law was ruled unconstitutional in 1997, although social taboos around marriages between those in the same clan still lingered.

In 2005, because of social changes that allowed for more diverse family structures and citizens' broad participation on the issue through Internet channels, the government and feminist movements finally agreed to abolish the entire concept of family head system from the Constitution. This also reformed the exogamy law to only outlaw marriage between close relations. Not only was this a remarkable achievement by feminist movements improving Korean women's social and political position, but it is also regarded as a landmark "effort to decolonize [Korean] law and society."

=== Reproductive autonomy and law ===
In 2013, South Korea outlawed marital rape.

The government of South Korea criminalized abortion in the 1953 Criminal Code in all circumstances. This South Korean abortion law was amended by the Maternal and Child Health Law of 1973, which permitted a physician to perform an abortion if the pregnant woman or her spouse suffered from certain hereditary or communicable diseases, if the pregnancy resulted from rape or incest, or if continuing the pregnancy would jeopardize the woman's health. Any physician who violated the law was punished by two years' imprisonment. Self-induced abortions were illegal and punishable by a fine or imprisonment. The Constitutional Court on 11 April 2019 ruled the abortion law unconstitutional and ordered the law's revision by the end of 2020.

Despite the Constitutional Court's ruling, no revision of the law has been made as of 2023. About four years after the constitutional nonconformity ruling, women's right to sexual self-determination in South Korea is in danger. Women are exposed to dangerous illegal drugs due to the lack of follow-up legislation on abortion.

== See also ==
- Gender inequality in South Korea
- Idaenam
- Wednesday demonstration
- Women in South Korea

== Bibliography ==
- Fisher, Max (August 23, 2012). "Gangnam Style, Dissected: The Subversive Message Within South Korea's Music Video Sensation". The Atlantic.
- Jeong, Euisol; Lee, Jieun (2018). "We take the red pill, we confront the DickTrix: online feminist activism and the augmentation of gendered realities in South Korea". Feminist Media Studies. 18 (4): 705–717. doi:10.1080/14680777.2018.1447354.
- Jung, Hawon (2023). Flowers of Fire: The Inside Story of South Korea's Feminist Movement and What It Means for Women' s Rights Worldwide. Dallas, TX: BenBella Books.
- Kim, Jae-hui (June 23, 2015). 일베도 서럽게 만든, '메갈리아의 딸들' [Even Ilbe was made to feel contrition by the 'Megalia sisterhood']. OhmyNews (in Korean).
- Kim, Donna Do-own (2020). "Mirroring the Misogynistic Wor(l)d: Civic Imagination and Speech Mirroring Strategy in Korea's Online Feminist Movement". In Jenkins, Henry; Peters-Lazaro, Gabriel; Shresthova, Sangita (eds.). Popular Culture and the Civic Imagination: Case Studies of Creative Social Change. New York: New York University Press.
- Kim, Seo-yeong (July 8, 2016c). '메갈리아' 성향 따라 워마드·레디즘 등으로 분화 ['Megalia' splits off Womad and Ladism that are of a different flavor]. Kyunghyang Shinmun (in Korean).
- Kim, Youngmi (2021a). "Mirroring Misogyny in Hell Chosŏn: Megalia, Womad, and Korea's Feminism in the Age of Digital Populism". European Journal of Korean Studies. 20 (2): 101–133. doi:10.33526/EJKS.20212002.101. hdl:20.500.11820/8021dd70-8fdf-4bf8-8c11-407c274fa686.
- Kwon, Jake (October 2, 2021). "Why a hand gesture has South Korean companies on edge". CNN Business.
- Lee, Claire (18 November 2018b). "'Isu station' assault case triggers online gender war in South Korea". The Korea Herald.
- Rothman, Lauren (January 19, 2015). "Korean Women Are Starving Themselves to Afford a Cup of Coffee". Vice News.
- Shinyun, Dong-uk (January 13, 2016). 어떤 입으로 말하고, 누구의 귀로 들을까? [Whose mouths, whose ears?]. The Hankyoreh (in Korean).
- Steger, Isabella (October 23, 2016). "An epic battle between feminism and deep-seated misogyny is under way in South Korea". Quartz News.
- Sussman, Anna Louise (March 24, 2023). "The Real Reason South Koreans Aren't Having Babies". The Atlantic.
