= Gender inequality in South Korea =

South Korea has experienced significant improvements for social changes in recent years, compared to previous times, when Confucianism was deeply imbued in the culture. Gender roles and gender identities have been modified in response to modernity. Gender inequality in South Korea has been described as being derived from deeply rooted ideologies with specifically defined gender-roles. While it remains prevalent in South Korea's economy and politics, gender inequality has decreased in healthcare and education. Gender payment gap remains a major issue; as of 2023, South Korean women earn $22,750 less than men based on 2021 purchasing power parity. South Korea has generally ranked low in gender equality indexes, ranking last in the Glass Ceiling Index published by The Economist in 2020 and 101st out of 148 countries in the World Economic Forum's Global Gender Gap Report.

== Gender statistics ==
Due to the various methods of calculating and measuring gender inequality, South Korea's gender inequality rankings vary across different reports. While the 2017 UNDP Gender Inequality Index ranks South Korea 10th out of 160 countries, the World Economic Forum ranks South Korea 118th out of 144 countries in its 2017 Global Gender Gap Report. In their 2013 study, Branisa et al. explain that indices like the Global Gender Gap Index tend to be "outcome-focused", which means they focus on gender inequalities in agency and in well-being.

Indices like the Social Institutions and Gender Index (SIGI) focus on the origins of gender inequalities, such as laws and norms. South Korea is one of three OECD countries that did not receive a perfect SIGI score. While the SIGI did not give South Korea an overall ranking, the country was reported to have very low levels of discriminatory family code, low levels of restricted civil liberties, and medium levels of restricted resources and assets.

In 2010, 93% of South Koreans surveyed believed women should have equal rights to men, and among them, 71% believe more changes are needed before that goal is achieved.

South Korea's subindices rankings in the 2025 Global Gender Gap Report
Subindex	Rank (out of 148 countries)	Score (0 = imparity, 1 = parity)
Global Gender Gap Index	101	0.696
Economic Participation and Opportunity	114	0 605
Educational Attainment	98	0.980
Health and Survival	35	0.976
Political Empowerment	92	0.223

South Korea's female to male ratios in the 2025 Global Gender Gap Report
Indicators	Rank (out of 148 countries)	South Korea's female to male ratio
Wage equality for similar work	94	0.602
Estimated earned income	116	0.515
Legislators, senior officials and managers	124	0.213
Enrollment in tertiary education	117	0.855
Women in parliament	102	0.255
Women in ministerial positions	85	0.231
Years with female head of state (last 50)	39	0.104

Korea ranks 114th in college enrollment, with 111 percent for men and 85 percent for women. There is a strange conclusion that 111 out of 100 Korean men go to college. Taking a leave of absence without leaving school is also treated as a university education period, because it is common to take a leave of absence during the military period, which increases the education period.

== History ==
Gender inequality in South Korea is largely rooted in the country's Confucian ideals and has been perpetuated and deepened by historical practices and events, such as Japanese forced sex slavery and Park Geun-Hye's scandal. However, contemporary South Korea has made great strides in attempting to reduce gender inequality through legislation and policy-making.

=== Confucianism ===
Confucianism is a socio-political philosophy and belief system that has had a long-standing influence on South Korean society. It was first brought to Korea in the fourth century and Neo-Confucianism was chosen as the national ideology during the Joseon dynasty (1392-1897).

Confucianism is an ideology that emphasises the importance of a social hierarchy in order to create a balanced and harmonious society. This hierarchy is illustrated through the Five Relationships, a key teaching in Confucianism that describes the main basic relationships between people as follows; ruler and ruled, father and son, husband and wife, elder brother and younger brother and friend and friend.

The roles in each relationship were also prescribed individual duties which, for husband and wife, involved the husband acting as the bread-winner for the family while the wife was to stay at home, raise the children and maintain the household. The Three Bonds are an extension of these relationships that later appeared in Confucian literature and emphasise the hierarchical nature of the relationships as follows; the ruler over the ruled, the father over the son and the husband over the wife. This core Confucian principle emphasises a woman's role as subservient to her husband.

Another key teaching in Confucian literature that directly influences the subjugation of women are the Three Obediences and the Four Virtues, guidelines that describe how a woman should behave in society. The Three Obediences require that women "obey the father before the marriage, obey the husband after marriage, and obey the first son after the death of the husband" while The Four Virtues require "(sexual) morality, proper speech, modest manner, and diligent work".

The Joseon dynasty saw a particular shift in gender roles as society transitioned from Buddhist to Confucian ideals. This resulted in the systems of marriage and kinship becoming patrilineal rather than matrilineal. As a husband's role was deemed superior to that of the wife, men not only had control over inheritance matters, but "the right to grant a divorce was limited to the state and the husbands themselves". Husbands were able to grant a divorce base on the Seven Sins for women or chilgeojiak (칠거지악); "disobeying one's parents-in-law, failure to produce a male heir, adultery, excessive jealousy towards other women in the household, serious disease, stealing, and talking excessively".

=== Wartime sex slavery ===
During World War II, thousands of young Korean women (Japanese citizens at that time) were forcibly recruited to work as prostitutes or "comfort women" by contracts with Korean brothels to serve for the Japanese Imperial Army.

Kim Hak Sun stated an officer harmed and threatened her by saying that she would be killed if she did not obey him. She was then brutally raped. Together with other 4 young Korean women, she had to be a "hygienic tool used by Japanese soldiers to satisfy their sexual desire." In the comfort station, the victims aged between 17 and 22 had to deal with about 7 to 8 Japanese soldiers a day in small rooms that were separated from one another by cloth. Lee Yong-soo was sixteen when she was forced to become a comfort woman. She recalls that on average, she was forced into sexual relations with four to five men a day and did not have any rest even when she was menstruating. She also says that she "suffered electrical torture, was beaten and was cut by a soldier's knife." She learned to submit, not wanting to be shocked or beaten again. Kim Bok-dong at age 14~15 in 1941, and her mother were lied to by Japanese authorities; Kim Bok-dong was told that she was to support the war efforts by working in a military clothing factory and would return in three years. If not, her family would be considered traitors. The Japanese authorities demanded that her mother, who could not read, sign a document. Her mother conceded to the demand, believing that her daughter would work in a factory in Japan. Instead, she was put into militarized sexual slavery in Japanese occupied territories for eight years, including Guangdong, Hong Kong, Singapore, Indonesia, and Malaysia. Kim Bok-dong was raped every day, especially from 8 a.m. to 5 p.m. on Sundays. Many Koreans view these as atrocities and raise money for charities including many celebrities.

=== Legislation ===
After the democratization of Korea, the number of feminist movements greatly increased. The Korean government began to address gender equality issues in the late 20th century with the following legislative acts:

- Sexual Equality Employment Act (1987)
- Act on Equal Employment and Reconciliation of Work and Family (1989)
- Mother-Child Welfare Act (1991)
- Punishment of Sexual Violence and Protection of the Victim Act (1993)
- Women's Development Act (1995)
- Prevention of Domestic Violence and Protection of the Victim Act (1997)

In 2005, the Ministry of Gender Equality and Family was established and the patrilineal family register (hoju) was abolished. While gender equality in policymaking and governance has improved over the last few decades, gender equality in labor markets and the division of labor has remained stagnant.

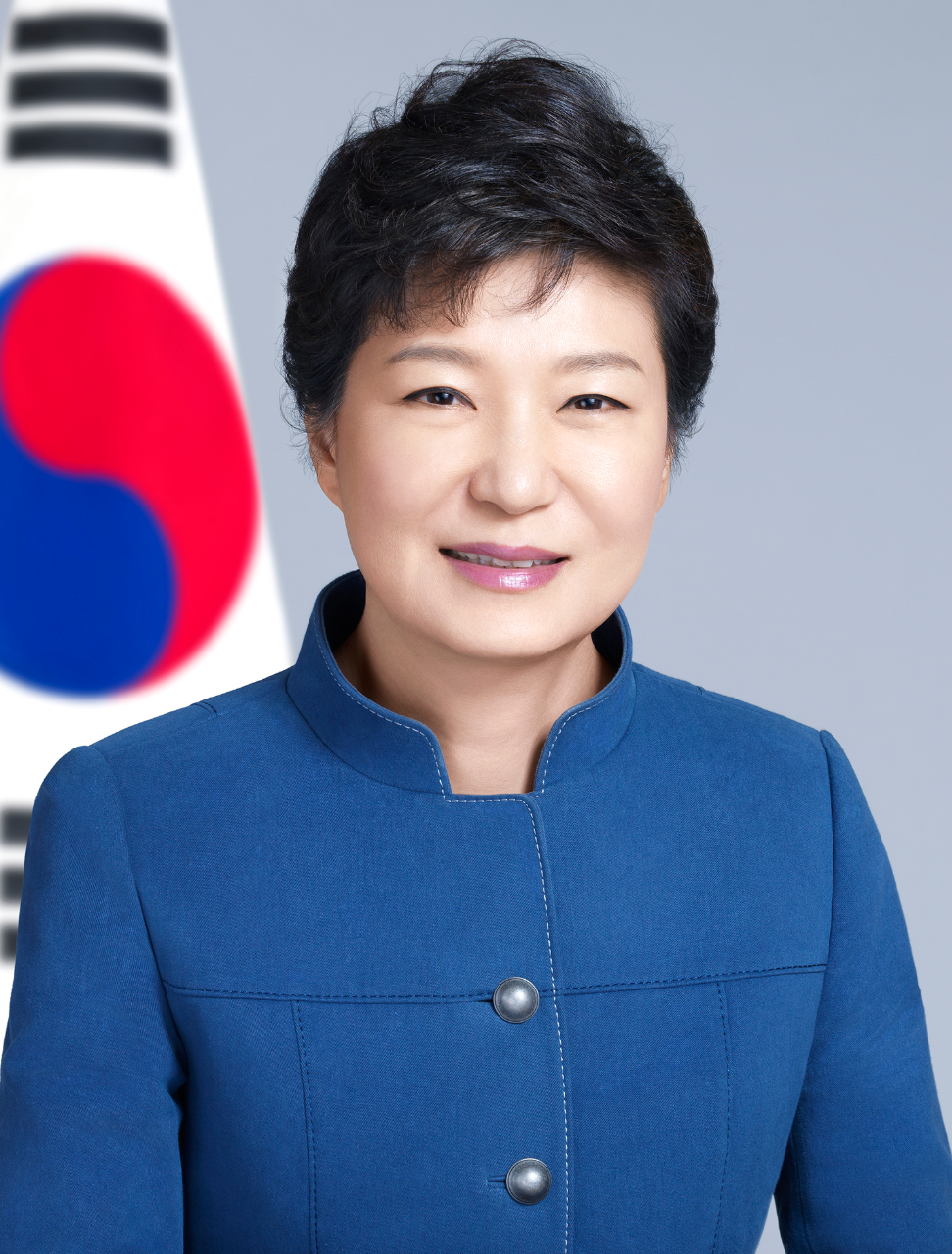
Park Geun-Hye

=== Park Geun-hye ===
Although women gained the rights to vote and run for election in 1948, women have historically been underrepresented in South Korean politics. When Park Geun-hye became South Korea's first female president in 2012, many viewed her election as a victory for gender equality in South Korea. Four years later, her scandal and impeachment nullified any progress made by her election and left many convinced that women are not fit to lead their country. Many experts were also skeptical about watching Park Geun-hye as a female politician, saying she used her gender as an opportunity to influence conservative politics, and attempted to involve gender issues into seemingly unrelated political debates.

== Professional inequality ==
The Gender wage gap in OECD countries

The professional inequality in South Korea is atypically high among developed countries. This type of inequality can be seen in statistics concerning South Korea's wage gap, employment rates, occupational segregation, and parental leave.

=== Wage gap ===
In their 2001 article about gender differences in earnings among South Korean workers in 1988, Monk-Turner and Turner report that "all else equal, men earn from 33.6 percent to 46.9 percent more than women with comparable skills." In 2017, the OECD placed Korea in the last position of all OECD countries for gender pay gap, a position that has not improved since the OECD first published this ranking in 2000. The gender pay gap in Korea is 34.6%, while the OECD average is 13.1%.

The gap has improved by 7% since 2000, though the rate of improvement has been slower than in other OECD countries. The Korean gender pay gap has been called "the worst... among the industrialized countries." Korea also ranked the lowest for the eighth year in a row on the Glass Ceiling Index published by The Economist in 2020. The Glass Ceiling Index was determined by the country's performance on ten indicators such as wage gap, labor force participation, representation in senior jobs, paid maternity leave, etc. As of 2023, South Korean women earn $22,750 less than men based on 2021 purchasing power parity. As of 2025, the World Economic Forum ranks South Korea 94th out of 148 countries in wage inequality.

Although gender inequality in South Korea’s job market is among the worst in the OECD, such wage gaps tend to be less prominent for earners in their 20s.

=== Employment ===
Women tend to occupy low-paying, non-regular jobs and are less likely to be promoted to higher managerial positions in the workplace; however, employment opportunities for women in South Korea have steadily increased in the past few decades. Before the Korean War, the employment rate of women was less than 30%. In their 2018 Economic Survey for Korea, the OECD recorded the female employment rate to be around 56.1%, which is below the average (59.3%) for all OECD countries. The male employment rate is 75.9%, which is slightly higher than the OECD average (74.7%).

In their 2013 paper, Patterson and Walcutt found that gender inequality in the workplace stems from "a lack of legal enforcement, a weak punishment system, a tacit acceptance of the status quo by women, organizational cultural issues stemming from the traditional Korean mind-set that allow gender discrimination and a general lack of knowledge about EO [equal opportunity] regulations by many companies."

In addition to the societal and familial expectations of women to be primary caregivers, the OECD report explains that "women tend to withdraw from the labour force once they have children, in part due to shortages of high quality early childhood education and care institutions." During the 1970s and 1980s, women left the workforce at a very "early stage in family formation." Currently, they are leaving the workforce later, usually right before or during their pregnancy. May notes that this trend could be due to women's growing financial independence.

According to the World Economic Forum, South Korea is placed at number 124 out of 149 countries in the world in regards of economic participation and opportunity for women. Women are often faced with questions regarding their marriage status, or whether they are planning to have children when applying for a job, and are even prompted with suggestions that jobs in "male dominated" fields aren't appropriate for them.

=== Occupational segregation ===
Despite the rising employment rate for women, the labor force in Korea is still highly segregated by gender, marked by full-time employment gender share and industrial differences. In 2017, women in Korea made up 39.5% of the full-time employment population, in contrast to the 62.7% gender share in part-time employment. The relatively high part-time employment rate for women can partly be attributed to traditional Confucian ideals of gender roles in Korea, in which women are expected to take on the responsibility of family duties and childcare. Part-time employment allows for reconciliation of professional and family life, especially for women, as explained in a 2002 OECD Employment Outlook analysis.

In addition to differences in full- and part-time employment rates, gender inequality in Korea also manifests itself through industrial segregation. In a 1994 article, Monk-Turner and Turner observed that "farming and production absorbed 66.3 percent of all women workers," and "another 29 percent of all women work as clerical, sales, or service workers." In 2017, according to statistics from the International Labour Organization, agricultural sector employment had shrunk to around 5% for both men and women; 82.1% of women workers were concentrated in the service sector, with 11.5% in manufacturing and 1.4% in construction, in contrast to men with 61.9% in services, 20.8% in manufacturing, and 11.2% in construction.

In two decades, aside from the national trend of sectoral-shift away from agriculture for both men and women, the female working population remains highly clustered in certain industries, while the same pattern does not seem to apply for men. Furthermore, in the 2018 OECD Economic Survey for Korea, it was observed that within the entrepreneurial sphere, "female entrepreneurs are concentrated in basic livelihood sectors, such as health and social welfare, accommodations and restaurants, other personal services and educational services, reflecting in part their more limited access to financing and their educational background."

=== Parental leave ===
Although South Korea offers 12 weeks for maternity leave and the longest paid paternity leave among all the OECD countries at 51 weeks, taking the leave is highly unpopular and unofficially discouraged within Korean companies, which forces women out of the workplace following the birth of a child. As a result, working parents – especially mothers – receive relatively little support for child rearing. Public funding for parental leaves as well as the development of childcare programs have slowly gained ground in South Korea, where childcare and its economic sector had predominately been private.

== Household inequality ==
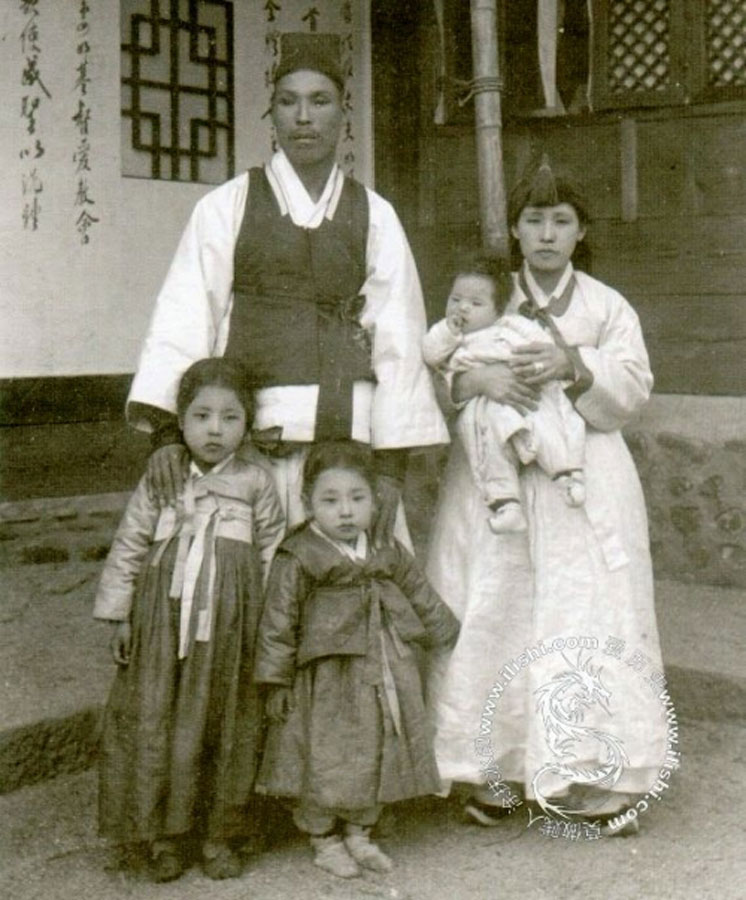
A Korean family in the 1800s

Confucian family values support traditional sex roles, with men expected to do "male-type" work and women expected to do "women-type" work. Since males are expected to be the major breadwinners in families, there is a strong cultural tendency to define females' roles as that of a wife, mother, and housekeeper. In 1998, a Korean Women's Development Institute survey found that majority of South Korean women did all of the housework in their homes.

As a consequence of household inequalities, South Korean women are marrying later and having fewer children. A 2007 report by Center for Strategic and International Studies notes these trends are "in many ways the worst of both worlds. Korea now has a lower fertility rate than any developed country and one of the lowest rates of female labor-force participation — 60% for women aged 25 to 54 versus 75% in the USA and 76% in the EU." The percentage of Korean women who say it is "necessary" to have children declined from 90% in 1991 to 58% in 2000.

The fertility rate continued to decline to a record low of 0.78 children per South Korean woman in 2022, down from a rate of 0.81 children per woman in 2021. This is the lowest rate of any country in the OECD, the average fertility rate of which was 1.59 in 2020. That year, South Korea had been the only member to have a rate less than 1—a declining population. In 1970, the average age of first marriage for females was 23; by 2005 it was almost 28. The report shows that traditional Korean family and workplace cultures must change in order to prevent serious economic and societal problems due to extremely low fertility rates.

== Special opportunity inequality ==
From the 20th century to the modern era, access to tertiary education for women has risen but remains comparably lower than a number of developed countries, particularly those that have a higher proportion of educated women than men. The prevalence of a male-dominated working force, and the stringent parental supervision of children's education made women who pursued tertiary education to view further education as a tool for training children rather than pursuing a career. Although 74.9% of South Korea women (between the ages of 25 and 34) have completed tertiary education - a percentage that is much higher than the OECD average (50.7%) - the employment rate of women with tertiary education is the lowest in the OECD.

Within primary and secondary education, greater female participation in STEM fields is being promoted. Tertiary institutions are being pushed to admit more women.

== Gender inequalities in everyday life ==
=== Expectations of gendered role playing ===
Conventional ideals of femininity are constructed through a gender imbalance between men and women, which exhibits itself in everyday life. One example of this is women being expected to perform aegyo (애교) by friends and colleagues. Aegyo is the performance of child-like actions characterised by facial expressions, gestures, and voice tone in order to appear "cute". While this behaviour can be performed by both men and women, it is generally the women who are asked to do aegyo.

In one particular article it was mentioned that women are often expected to perform aegyo in the workplace to "lighten the mood". It was further noted that females using aegyo at work are perceived as more pleasant. The need for women to appear cute and delicate in order to be regarded as pleasant is an illustration of how gender inequality manifests itself in daily life.

=== Escape the corset movement ===
These daily inequalities and standards of femininity placed on women in South Korea are being challenged by the "escape the corset" movement. The norm for women is generally to have long hair, wear make-up and dress well, while the expectations for men are less rigid. This ideal is so prevalent in society that some women find it necessary to grow out their hair in order to attend job interviews. The escape the corset movement responds to this by encouraging women to boycott clothing and beauty industries. This has led to the cosmetic surgery sector losing money. To further fight these daily inequalities, a lot of women are also against the idea of marriage as in South Korea they would often be expected to abandon their careers to raise a child.

== Inequality in the media ==
The conversation of gender inequality is becoming increasingly prevalent in South Korean media partly due to the double standards male and female celebrities have to face regarding their body image. While some stars have spoken up on the matter, female celebrities tend to face much harsher backlash for doing so than their male counterparts.

=== Media discourse on gender inequality ===
In the South Korean media, female K-pop artists and actors often face harsh criticism for speaking about gender inequality. For example, Irene of the girl group Red Velvet commented on the book Kim Ji-young, born 1982, a feminist novel talking about the daily gender inequalities experienced by women in South Korea. As a result, she experienced a huge backlash from male fans who expressed their anger and disappointment by burning merchandise. The book had sparked much controversy upon release as the Gangnam Station murder had occurred only a few months earlier. While male idols, such as RM of BTS, also read and commented on the book they did not receive as much backlash as female idols. The book was later turned into a film and this too received much hate from the public.

Gong Hyo-jin, a K-drama actress that appeared in When the Camellia Blooms, is also vocal about gender inequality in Korea. She chooses stronger female characters to play in her dramas and works with female directors who share her views. Her actions are met with backlash such as petitions to forbid her films from being screened. There are several other celebrities that have similar situations such as Bae Suzy, Moon Ga-young and Joy from Red Velvet.

Recently, to fight gender inequality in media representation, more K-dramas have started to include strong female characters such as Strong woman Do Bong Soon or Search: WWW. This is a big change from the typical "candy girl" image that has been seen so many times in K-dramas such as Boys Over Flowers. The "candy girl" trope tells the story of a rich man who falls in love with a poor yet optimistic girl.

=== Body standards in K-pop ===
Disparities between male and female gender roles are prevalent in the K-pop industry and have been highlighted following the hallyu wave of the late 2000s. The commodification of idols' bodies and practices surrounding idol-fan culture have allowed for the sexualisation of idols, disproportionately reflecting on women's beauty standards. Female idols' bodies have been subjected to scrutiny and objectification from both fans and professionals within the industry. Female idols are regarded as properties of the national collective while male idols are portrayed as the "hard male musculature [that] symbolises Korean global might". This issue has only worsened with the popularisation of digital media such as YouTube and Twitter and the availability of idol content. With a particular emphasis on female idols, success is increasingly reliant on the public approval of one's appearance.

With 20% of young South Korean women having undergone plastic surgery in 2020, standards projected onto female idols fall into a greater cultural practice of inequality and a historical inequity between gendered roles within society. A further reflection of these standards has been projected by expectations of weight conformity imposed upon female idols and the "50kg rule". Famous female idols such as singer IU and members of girl group f(x) have openly discussed the drastic measures taken to lose weight, an expectation seen as imperative for all female idols to follow. f(x) member Luna claimed that her lowest weight was 40 kg, and that she achieved an 8 kg weight loss in just a week after drinking only three litres of tea a day.

Although extreme diets are considered the norm for all K-pop idols, recent media attention has been drawn to the fixation of female idol weight loss, particularly after a Korean drama star commented that "if a woman weighs over 50kg, she must be nuts". A 2016 national survey revealed that 72% of girls under 18 in South Korea compared to 36% of boys felt that they needed to lose weight. A similar study conducted by Dr Yuli Kim found that 1 in 3 South Korean women are predicted to have an eating disorder. Currently, the phenomenon of sharing extreme diet tips by Pro-ana (Pro-anorexia) groups has been cited as a social problem.

== Gender-based violence ==
Gender-based violence is a result of the manifestation of unequal power relations between women and men. Gender-based crimes rely on inequalities of gender and further force women into a subordinate position. Violence against women is a global problem, and one that continues to pervade South Korean contemporary society. For example, women are statistically more likely to become a victim of intimate partner violence and dating violence in South Korea. In 2019, Korea Women's Hot Line's analysis of crimes reported by the media shows at least one woman was killed or nearly killed by her male partner every 1.8 days.

The Gangnam Station murder occurred in 2016 when a man murdered a woman he had never met before, claiming it was out of a general hatred for women.

== See also ==
- Feminism in South Korea
- Gender inequality in North Korea
- Ministry of Gender Equality and Family, South Korea
- Molka, hidden camera crime in South Korea
- Women in South Korea
- Women's rights in South Korea
