= Gangnam Station Post-it Note protest =

2016 protest in Seoul

The Gangnam Station Post-it Note protest in Seoul, South Korea was organized in response to the murder of a 23-year-old woman inside a public toilet by a 34-year-old man in Seoul, on May 17, 2016, also known as Seocho-dong public toilet murder case.

The protest was held just at the exit of Gangnam metro station where the wall was filled with post-it sticky notes and many chrysanthemum flowers. Seong-min Kim justified the reason behind his killing was that he felt disregarded by women his whole life, and the courts ruled in his favor. Protestors demanded justice and claimed that the killing was based on gender-based discrimination. However, the police gave a statement that there was a mental stability in the man and highlighted that the motives behind the murder was not prejudice against a certain gender but an experience from the mental disorder. The motive was further reinforced by an article from The Korea Herald. The man was reported to have been admitted to hospital for treatment on his mental illness.

== Gangnam Station murder case ==
The "Gangnam Station Murder Case" (also called the Seocho-dong public toilet murder case) occurred in Seoul on May 17, 2016. A 34-year-old man, Seong-min Kim, hid in a gender-neutral restroom for more than an hour inside a karaoke bar near Gangnam station, an expensive area in the city, and stabbed a woman entering a toilet four times with a kitchen knife at around 1 am. The surveillance cameras showed that before the incident, there were men going in and coming out of the restroom unharmed. Finally when a woman went in, she was attacked by the murderer. He was later arrested by the police.

== Judicial proceedings ==
On May 22, the police announced the results of the investigation as a motiveless crime by one with a mental illness, not a hate crime. On June 1, comprehensive measures against violent and motiveless crimes were announced. On July 10, the prosecution too announced that the case was not a hate crime. On October 14, the Seoul Central District Court sentenced Kim to 30 years in prison, and the judicial procedures were concluded.

== Conflict ==
Immediately after his arrest, Kim stated during police examination, "I have often been ignored by women and committed crime because I could not take it anymore." The police remarked that this was a motiveless crime by one who had a mental illness, schizophrenia, who had not been taking his medicine since he ran away from home in March. Since the announcement, the conflict between those who agree that the crime is without motivation and those who think it a gender-based hate crime had intensified.

== Responses ==
=== Media representations ===
The difference in the viewpoints on the case also appeared in the media . In analysis of the articles of political conservative journals Chosun and Dong-A and the progressive journals Kyunghyang and Hankyoreh, this murder case was reconstructed differently at each side. <Chosun> and <Dong-a> reported it as a murder case of mental illness in the unsafe public space of the toilet. In contrast, Kyunghyang and Hankyoreh reported the story as a female hate crime, a result of daily violence against women. Causes and solutions of this occasion were explained differently on each side.

With regard to the incident's cause, conservatives pointed out carelessness about the management of mental illnesses and about gender-neutral toilets. And the solution was also seen in the management of mental illnesses and the improvement of public toilets. The focus was on social conflict and confusion caused by different perceptions or ignored the characteristics of gender violence implicated in the case to define it as motiveless crime.

The progressive side attributed the murder to the sexist culture perpetuated in Korean society.

Violent crimes are not very common in the country however statistics from government data had indeed shown an increase in the number of reported sexual violence cases has increased that year. The 2015 U.S. State Department report showed that South Korea had scored high on the category of its safety - calculated based on the number of crimes the occurred and ranked extremely low on the category of upholding gender equality. Statistics have shown that physical abuse is pervasive in the country, and, according to a study in 2014, the percentage of the number of women that has been physically abused by their partner went up to 50 percent.

=== Civilian ===
Since May 18, information about the case had spread through SNS such as Twitter, and the people gathered to memorialize the victim at Gangnam station 10th Exit and wrote messages on Post-It notes, and attaching them to the exit. The memorial spread to Busan, Daegu, Gwangju, Daejeon, Bucheon, Ulsan, Cheongju, and Jeonju. During the two months from May 18 to July 15, the number of Post-It notes reached 35,340.

The Number of Post-It Notes
	City	The Number
1	Seoul	21,454
2	Busan	5,471
3	Daegu	3,214
4	Gwangju	583
5	Daejeon	1,646
6	Bucheon	654
7	Ulsan	1,199
8	Cheongju	434
9	Jeonju	695
The Number of Offline Cases		35,350

In addition to the Post-It protests, debates and sexual violence filibuster were held in each area, and the existing group-centered movements changed into voluntary participation and practice of individuals through self-awareness and empathy. Afterwards, a team from Kyunghyang Newspaper collected and analyzed 1004 Post-It notes. The Korean Womenlink recorded 42 stories from the speakout at Sinchon Plaza, and the Seoul Foundation of Women & Family collected, archived, and preserved most Post-It notes as data.

A group of young women, led in part by Yoon-ha Park, one of the initiators, started a Facebook page named "Gangnam 10th". The protest were no longer restricted to posting Post-Its but went further to marches in the city. Park believed that the existence of prejudice against women is clearly evident in the Korean community and hoped that the protests could remain as corroboration.

=== Opposition ===
Not everyone supported and participated in the memorials and outpouring of sympathy. A person wearing a 'Pink Elephant' mask came up with a picket with the content, "The carnivore is not bad, but animals who committed crime are bad. Korea is the first in security in the world, but we should make safer Korea by harmony between men and women." It meant that women were the food that feed animals, that is, sexually objectified, which enraged people, and the protester fled. Others argued that the memorial site had become misandric, the abhorrence of each other should stop, and the focus should be on preventing the recurrence of this case through a union of men and women. Some criticized and attacked women for making men potential perpetrators. Apart from the Pink Elephant Kim, a number of Korean animated movies have mocked the value of the "over-feminist" movement evident in the protests.

This incident has also led to a discomfort in men being categorised as potential criminals. A counter-protest started by Korean men broke out when national protests and discussions centered around misogyny existing in their community. When BuzzFeed News went for a visit to the Gangnam station entrance, the "Don't hate men" protest had broken out again.

== Symbolism and meaning ==
This Post-It protest was a challenge to and a frame-shift for the interpretation of events. Instead of a motiveless crime caused by mental illness, it was called femicide based on gender-based hate, and it changed the frame of interpretation dominant at the time.

Post-Its has emerged as a medium in a series of tragedies and memorials in Korean society such as Sewol Ferry disaster and this Gangnam station murder case. Recently, citizens used these notes as a means of collectively expressing their feelings and opinions. An anonymous participant who sympathizes with the need to commemorate and to communicate would briefly stop by the space and write down briefly their momentary thoughts and emotions. Post-Its are a way of expressing a personal story in handwriting, a means of expressing empathy at memorials centered on the younger generation, and a tool of symbolizing solidarity at rapidly spreading memorial.

The most important feature of the Post-It note is that it is short and autonomous like the text on the SNS, and its fluidity. It is also characterized by propagation, and archival traits. As such, it has the advantage of capturing the participant's feelings at a particular moment.

Chrysanthemum flowers that were left together with the notes serving as a symbol of mourning in South Korea.

== Legacy ==
There are reasons why Gangnam station 10th Exit became remarkable. First, it had spatial specificity. The murder case happened near it, a place where many women have gone, go, or will go. The station is not any metro station: It is a site of various kinds of consumption, eight kilometers long and a back-street nightlife space. A high number of people aggregate here, so it is considered relatively safe. The fact that the murder, targeting a woman, happened so close to it is a testament to a society in which all places are still gendered and safety may be gender-based.

Next, through this incident, many women examined their anxieties and fears in their daily lives, reflected upon their own experiences, and pulled from their unconscious that the unstable feelings led to the experiences of actual violence. So the 10th Exit became a place to remind them of painful memories and to share experiences of violence.

In all, it should be interpreted as a sign to face gender discrimination and the society to reform as a whole, not as a demand for heavy penalties for one perpetrator or as an expression of aversion to men.
