= Minjuhwa =

South Korean political satire of the word "democratization"

- Hangul: 민주화
- Hanja: 民主化, sometimes 民主和
- RR: minjuhwa
- MR: minjuhwa

Minjuhwa or Minjoohwa (Korean: 민주화; Hanja: 民主化, sometimes 民主和) is political satire of the word democratization in South Korea. It now only remains in usage in far right communities despite its apolitical origins. It is alleged by some that it was coined in 1991, originally used by anonymous apolitical undergraduate netizens to describe violent opposition and mock annihilation of minority opinions.

South Korean newspaper Jeonjashinmun defines this term as "to suffer damage" or "to receive unfair treatment", and says it is usually used in the expression Minjuhwadanghaetda (민주화당했다) or Minjuhwadanghada (민주화당하다).

== History and origins ==
Minjuhwa originally meant "democratization" in the Korean language, and is still used in this positive context. However, in certain communities, the word was used in a different sense for violent campus activism, in which minjuhwa was satirically used to describe "anti-democratic" or "totalitarian" behaviour, or "populism", and in some cases, democracy disguised as an "fascism". Some trace the usage of the word from apolitical undergraduates in the June of 1991, when leftist undergraduates became angry in reaction to Hankuk University of Foreign Studies professor Jeong Won-sik becoming the prime minister of the Roh Tae-Woo government, and threw eggs and attacked Jeong. (Note: Some report that Minjuhwa was commonly used online in the 1990s by non-political undergraduates to humorously describe the violence of political undergraduates, with Internet usage spreading to the general South Korean populace in the mid and late 1990s,)

Dong-A ilbo traces the origin of the negative usage to the 2008 US beef protest in South Korea, where false rumors about mad cow disease were propagated among leftist groups.

In the 2010s, the meaning of the word expanded to include suffering from violence and forcing deprivation of money and a common satirical meaning of assaulting disorderly students, being beaten by teachers, or assaulted by a ruffian. The term is also used to jokingly refer to the appearance of unattractive people.

The term is used by the far right online community Ilbe Storehouse as a slang term and the name of their "down-voting button", using "democratization" to mean "the citizens create chaos", "to destroy", or "to make disappear".

== Examples ==
- "My dog's breed name is minjuhwa" .
- "My girlfriend's shoes' name is minjuhwa". (Note: A korean pun.Hwa is shoes in the Hangul pronunciation and spelling, while Minju or Minjoo (민주) is a common Korean female name.)

== Notable uses ==
During the May 14, 2013 broadcast of SBS Power FM's Choi Hwajung's Power Time, the four members of Secret participated in a game in which they were given two options and each member would say which one they preferred. The purpose of the game was to test the members' teamwork and see if they would agree and have the same set of answers. Among the several pairs of choices given, the members of Secret were able to agree three times. After the MC declared this, Hyoseong then remarked:

저희는 개성을 존중하는 팀이거든요. 민주화시키지 않아요. (You see, we are a team that respects individuality. We don't force democratization.)

In response to this, netizens claimed that Hyoseong used the term "democratization" in a negative manner.

== Reception ==
Usage of the word in a negative manner was criticized by leftist groups as distorting the values of democracy. The usage of the word was considered an influx of far right concepts.

== See also ==
- Angry young man (South Korea)
