= 2016 Seocho-dong public-toilet murder case =

Murder in Seoul, South Korea

Seocho-dong public toilet murder case
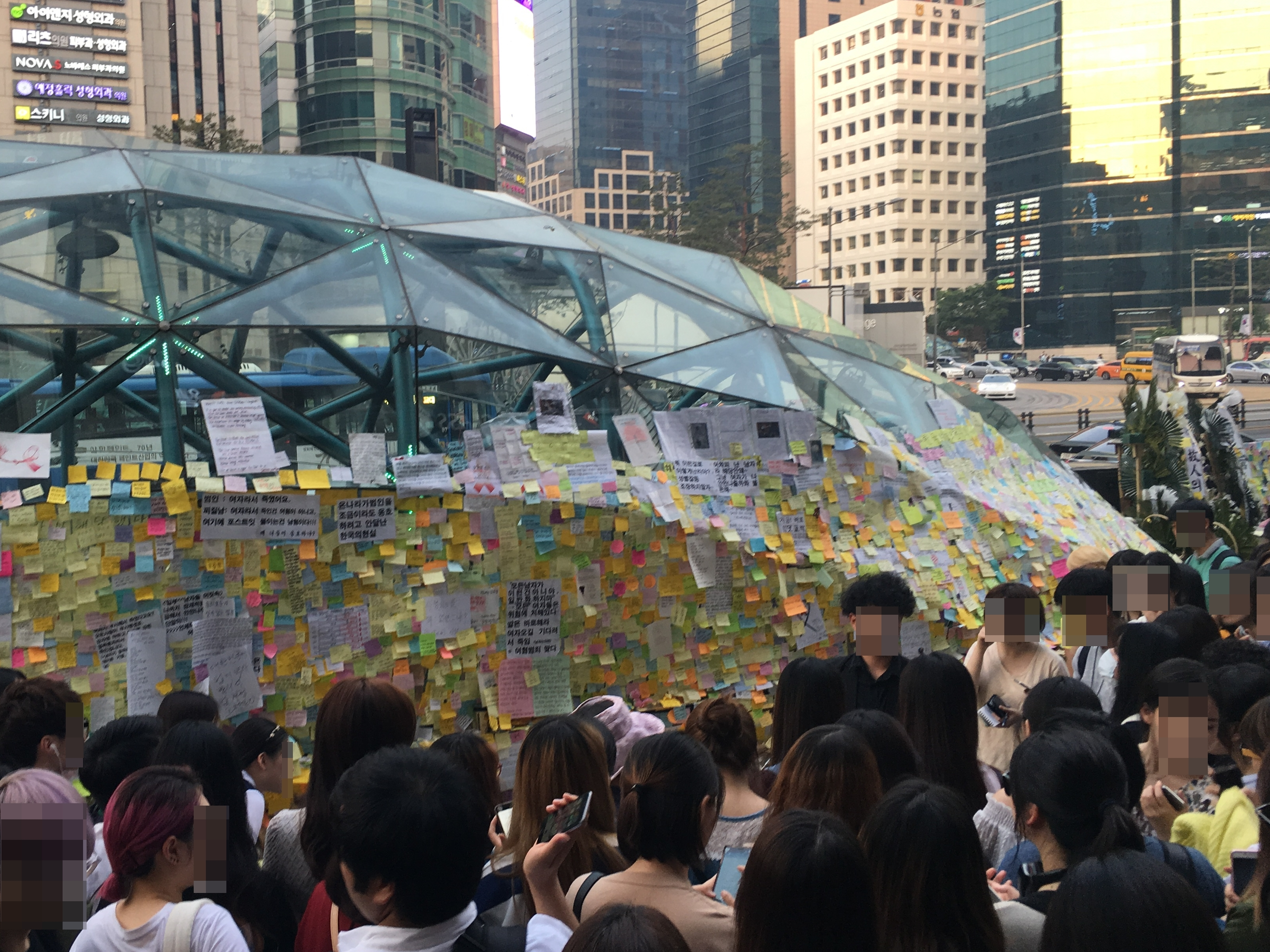
- The memorial place in gate of exit 10 in Gangnam Station on 20 May 2016
- Native name: 서초동 화장실 살인사건
- Date: 17 May 2016
- Time: 01:07 a.m. (KST)
- Location: Seocho-dong, Seocho District, Seoul, South Korea
- Type: murder
- Outcome: one person killed: Start of anti-misogyny movement
- Deaths: 1
- Inquest: ongoing

The Seocho-dong public restroom murder case (Korean: 서초동 화장실 살인사건), commonly known as the Gangnam Station murder case or the Gangnam Station femicide occurred at the public restroom of a karaoke bar in Seocho District, Seoul, South Korea, on 17 May 2016. Kim Seong-min (aged 34) stabbed a woman he had never met before to death, and later claimed that he did so out of his hatred for women as they had ignored and humiliated him all his life. The police later disputed his claims and said the incident was not a hate crime against women, as claimed, but one driven by mental illness. In accordance with South Korean customs, the identity of the victim has not been publicly disclosed to protect their privacy and the dignity of their family. On 13 April 2017, the Supreme Court of the Republic of Korea finalized the sentence of 30 years in prison for the murderer Kim Seong-min.

== Incident ==
Kim Seong-min, a 34-year-old employee of a nearby liquor store near Gangnam Station in Seoul, entered the karaoke bar's toilet in Seocho-dong, Seocho District, Seoul, at about 12:33 am on 17 May 2016. A 23-year-old woman, whose identity has been withheld for privacy reasons, who entered the restroom at 1:07 am, was stabbed in the left chest four times with a kitchen knife measuring 32.5 cm (12.8 in). The attacker testified that he was not acquainted with the victim and he committed the crime because he was ignored by women.

== Investigation ==
Immediately after being arrested, Kim Seong-min testified that he was frequently ignored by women and committed the murder because he could not take it anymore. On 19 May, Seoul Seocho Police Station announced that "On 18 May, Kim's mother was summoned and confirmed the medical records of Kim being treated for a chronic illness since 2008. Kim was hospitalized four times due to his mental illness and was diagnosed by his physician at the time of discharge in early January 2016 that he could experience further episodes if he did not take the prescribed medicine. Despite this, he did not take any medication since he left home at the end of March 2016." In addition, they said, "In-depth analysis of Kim's feelings and attitudes at the present stage is needed." On 19 May and 20 May, Kim was psychologically analyzed twice by five profilers including National Police Agency criminal behavior analysis team leader Il Yong Kwon.

On 22 May, Seoul Seocho Police Station published the suspect's psychological analysis. Since adolescence, he was unable to sit still, from 2003 to 2007, he told neighbors he could "hear someone swearing at me", and at a seminary in 2014, he ideated that "I am trying my best, but I think that women limit and harass me". He has a delusion where he is being hurt by women. However, no woman ever injured him. This led to a 2008 schizophrenia diagnosis and six total psychiatric institutionalizations. Since 2008, he developed self-neglect, spending more than a year without washing. Unaware of his mental illness after his early January 2016 deinstitutionalization, Kim stopped his medication and become delusional by the time of the crime.

In particular, the Seoul Seocho Police Station responded to Kim's motive, saying, "On 5 May, Kim was criticized for his hygiene at his restaurant workplace and transferred to a kitchen assistant position on 7 May. Even though nobody pointed out the hygiene problems directly to Kim, he thought women slandered him behind his back. This is considered the motive of the crime." Regarding misogyny (politicized in Korea), Kim said in an interview with the police, "I have no antipathy toward ordinary women and I am not a misogynist. There were times when I was also popular with women and there were women who liked me. The crime was due to the actual damage that women have done to me." He also said hating women online was "childish of young people, and [he is] different from them," and he spoke of the specifics of the actual damage the women inflicted on him, "women beat me on the shoulder in the subway, deliberately blocking my way and walking slowly to make me late. And women throw cigarette butts on me. I've endured all these microaggressions, and I felt I could not stand them any longer because they had bothered me even at my workplace. I thought I'd die if I stayed like this, so I thought I would kill first. I could not stand being hurt." The police decided this attitude was delusional, paradoxical, and not evidence-based. They declared "He firmly believes in general feelings and thoughts that he has been victimized by women. He calls it 'it is certain because I can feel it.' He committed a crime with deliberate accidents without directly relating to the motive of the crime or the victim. It is a characteristic of motiveless crime that the plan is disorganized unlike the purpose, such as not escaping the very next day and not destroying the evidence but coming to the restaurant and being arrested without any plan or preparation for arrest."

Criminal profiler Il-yong Kwon investigated the suspect to determine the motive was persecutory delusion from the schizophrenic suspect, and that the delusion "is not necessarily manifested only in women, but entirely hostile to the actions of others." However, he said that schizophrenic aggressiveness usually targets the vulnerable. He also said, "such schizophrenia itself is not what destroys everyone. Even though he is schizophrenic, he sometimes shows organization to achieve his wants." He explained that even schizophrenic crime can be organized and planned.

Before the second psychological interview on 20 May, pre-arrest questioning (real examination of warrant) was held on 19 May and an arrest warrant was issued by the Seoul Central District Court due to the crime severity and risk of flight or evidence destruction.

On 24 May at 8:30 am, the suspect exited Seocho Police Station, ignored journalists' questions, and boarded a police escort that arrived at the crime scene at 8:50. At 8:55, He told reporters at Gangnam Station exit 10 "I am calm now. I do not have any personal grudge or hate towards the victim, and I am sorry that she had been sacrificed anyway" and "I talked about [the motive] during the investigation and will during the trial." From 9:00 to 9:30, he reenacted the crime.

== Trial ==
In a 30 September 2016 trial, the prosecution sought life imprisonment, 20 years' mental health probation, and an ankle monitor. The Seoul Central District Court sentenced the suspect to 30 years on 14 October. Seoul High Court's criminal department 2 rejected the prosecution and the defendant's appeals on 12 January 2017, upholding the first trial. The Supreme Court also upheld it on 13 April 2017.

== Memorial and conflict ==
At the suggestion of a netizen, a memorial was established at Gangnam Station exit 10, close to the crime scene. It was covered with post-it notes against misogyny such as "female hate is a social problem" and "women who remain will make a better world" and flowers expressing condolences for the victim. Meanwhile, some social media posts claimed that interpreting the case as a misogynistic crime is a leap of logic such as "Women with victim mentality are over-expanding the case," "Are we supposed to be treated as potential criminals just because we are men?" A wreath with a ribbon saying "Do not forget the soldiers of Cheonan Ship who died because they were men," arrived on 19 May at exit 10. However, the ribbon was subsequently covered by a post-it in memory of the victim, and eventually removed.

On 20 May, a man wearing a pink elephant mask at exit 10 said, "It is not that carnivores are bad, it is that animals that commit crimes ... Zootopia without prejudice. ... We are making it together, men and women of the Republic of Korea, which is currently number one in security in the world, but is safer." Some female mourners tried to unmask him, saying, "If you are not a member of Ilbe, take it off with dignity." Seocho Police were called as a physical confrontation took place and eventually defused the situation. He reportedly posted on Ilbe Storehouse that he planned to "wear a mask and go to the memorial site." On the afternoon of 21 May, hundreds of mourners took part in a memorial march to and from Gangnam Station and the crime scene, and Ilbe members showed up at the event, arguing with the mourners. Fearing conflict, dozens of officers were deployed to the scene.

== Controversies ==
=== Misogyny ===
Unlike administrative departments such as investigative agencies, some experts from opposition parties, academia and civic groups opined that mental illness and misogyny are not mutually exclusive in crime. The Seoul Metropolitan Police Agency also said the previous day that it concluded that Kim's case was a "don't ask questions" caused by his persecutory delusion schizophrenia, based on a comprehensive analysis of Kim's psychology through two meetings on 19 and 20 July. They say that regardless of the nature of the crime, the reaction of women and men to the case itself is important because it reflects the current state of politics and society.

Professor Oh Yoon-seong explained, "From the perspective of the victims, we chose a weak partner, which is called a woman," and "nothing more than that." "I think there is a local symbolism," he said. "There are a lot of young couples coming and going (the chair) and I think they have been stressed out, and I think they have special feelings for the Gangnam area. ... Even though this person is said to have a history of mental illness, if he thought about avoiding arrest, he could continue to be satisfied. ... To analyze this problem, it comprises an unspecified number of crimes that one choose as a way to relieve their stress when they cannot find any other coping mechanism, ... The solution to that problem, is for our society as a whole to pay attention to those people and solve the negative aspects through communication. ... There is a danger that misogyny can be brought to the forefront, ... The concept of a confrontation between sexes is under considerable stress now that some people call it a misogyny crime, ... It is not desirable for society to be swayed by a single criminal's words. ... The primary reason is that there are quite a few young women in and out of the area (Gangnam Station), ... I believe that I can be that person, and that kind of psychological panic is spreading."

The 20th National Assembly president-elect of the Democratic Party, along with Pyo Chang-won, formerly a criminal profiler, said, "It is clear that it is a crime against unrelated women, including the history of the chair's mental illness," but added, "It is also true that there is a twisted male-centered subculture represented by Ilbe and Soranet." Meanwhile, he opposed politicizing the murder case at Gangnam Station.

In a commentary, the opposition Labor Party described the case as misogyny while "do not ask" refers to crimes characterized by impulsive abuse against an arbitrary person. The murder at Gangnam Station was neither directed nor impulsive toward an "arbitrary majority." He chose the crime scene and waited more than an hour for women to come in. Furthermore, the motive 'being ignored by a woman' proves that the case is not a killing but a misogynistic murder. Ignoring misogynistic crimes can lead to copycat crimes.

Hong Seong-soo, a law professor at Sookmyung Women's University, said the case is not just about "anyone" but about "anyone who is a woman," and is therefore not unreasonable to consider as a misogyny case. Hong said, 'Now that the subject of the crime was a matter of "anyone" versus "anyone who is a women," I think it safe to consider the case a misogynistic crime. The problem of these crimes should be taken seriously. Crimes based on unjustified anger are often brutal. The members of the group are terrified to target all groups. If "don't ask questions" targets arbitrary people, the scope of potential victims would be broadened, which is unlikely to be considered a personal problem. However, if there are frequent crimes against a certain group, such as women, foreigners and sexual minorities, it becomes a personal problem for the members of the group.'

Bang Yi-seul of the Korea Sexual Violence Counseling Center said, "It is rather out of touch with reality to see the case as irrelevant to misogyny ..., because the original misogyny itself is not perpetrated based on logic, but only because [the victim] is a woman."

Seo Cheon-seok, a youth psychiatrist said, "The symptoms of mental illness are social, ... The problem is that him saying he committed crimes 'because women ignored me.' The social context here is 'female disgust,' ... In the past authoritarian dictatorship, many schizophrenic patients complained of auditory hallucinations, telling me that the Korean Central Intelligence Agency (KCIA) was following me and eavesdropping, ... In the late 1980s, it was the U.S. Central Intelligence Agency (CIA), and it was Samsung in the late 2000s. ... If misogyny become diagnostic of mental illness, we must quarantine it from society ... We must stop the low-quality debate about whether misogyny or mental illness causes crime. ... The reason this case became a big issue is not because of what one criminal said, but because of the dangerous reality in our society where the crime took place. ... Women are not safe, being overrepresented as victims in violent incidents".

Professor Bae Eun-kyung of the sociology department at Seoul National University said, "If the incident was caused by real schizophrenia, it shows the misogynistic subconsciousness at work," adding, "The aggression in this irrational thinking shows the subconscious concepts against women."

Lee Woong-hyeok, a professor of police administration at Konkuk University, explained both cases of misogynistic crime and the combination of two factors: misogyny and mental illness. Lee first explained that police did not believe the suspect targeted women because they did not believe it was credible. However, if the motive for targeting women is true, it could be seen as a hate crime. He said "When I approach a woman in social life, if I think I am being ostracized or am emotionally shocked, I would think there is a problem with my mental judgment. If so, it is clearly of a slightly different nature than a mere pattern of automatistic crime, so-called 'questionless crime,' that it has been considered so far. Because our society recently had a lot of the so-called hateful sentiment and demeaning expressions such as 'Kimchi girl' or 'Doenjang Girl'. This general misogyny was evident in some excluded and marginalized men. ... For now, ... most women [probably] sympathize greatly with this case. ... I feel like I could easily be a victim, and lament the systemic discrimination, gender pay gap and other socioeconomic problems".

Lee Soo-jeong, a criminal psychology professor at Kyonggi University who rejected the "targeting women" hypothesis after interviewing the assailant, said "His level of schizophrenia was so severe that it was extremely difficult to make realistic judgments ... as to any particular group of people. ... It was an attack on anything that looked weaker than yourself in hallucinations or oblivion, not a misogynistic crime," she asserted. She also stressed it was "poor management of the mentally ill." On the other hand, the psychosis medicine was more effective than expected and suggested that "if someone had kept taking the drug now, it would not have happened now."

Lee Na-young, a sociology professor at Chung-Ang University, diagnosed it as "not a direct hate crime, but I think it can be seen as a crime caused by hate imprinted on the subconcious." She also assessed how people perceived the case rather than whether an individual felt misogyny and committed murder.

Professor Inayoung Lee said that fact many responded to the campaign to post a memorial note and criticize misogyny is insightful. He evaluated that as a systemic gender discrimination problem.

Some say this response is only natural when women are relatively weak in a male-dominated society. Shin Kwang-young said "This case is a crime based on innocent women's sacrifice and misogyny, ... This campaign could be an opportunity for us to demand a new society-level awareness and response to misogyny. ... Seeing this move as an overreaction means that the gender-aware education has not been done properly, ... The entire Korean society is male-dominated. Verbal abuse, physical abuse, and even murder are occurring based on misogyny, ... It can be seen as a matter of society, not of individuals anymore, ... Public hate speech and crime against foreigners, women and minorities should be punished through legislation, ... We should also strengthen the perception that it is a serious crime through education."

=== Mental health stigma ===
Medical workers have voiced concerns about the crime being dismissed as a matter of 'mental illness'. In a 2019 Korean study, crime rates of persons with schizophrenia were lower than the general population in most types of crimes. However the prevalence of murder was about five times higher, "suggesting a need for closer and more appropriate care."

=== Crime vulnerability in public toilets ===
It was pointed out that the case occurred in a public bathroom with door locks absent or relatively vulnerable to crime. Pyo Chang-won, president-elect of the National Assembly, said, "The excessive crime risk sensitivity promoted by the government, which emphasizes unsafe environmental design (such as public restrooms) and advanced security countries, is also a part of the problem."
