= Boseulachi =

Korean-language insult for women

- Hangul: 보슬아치
- RR: boseurachi
- MR: posŭrach'i

Boseulachi, occasionally spelled boslachi, is a South Korean insult formed from the words boji (Korean: 보지; lit. 'vulva') and byeoseurachi (벼슬아치; lit. 'bureaucrat').

== History ==
Some say the word originated during the 90s in the early days of Korean internet communities in PC Tongshin. But the word boseulachi is said to have emerged in 2006 on South Korean internet forums as a term South Korean men use to describe vain and egotistical women. It was ordinarily directed towards a girl or woman with an aggressive personality.

== Related expressions ==
A related expression was Doenjang Girl. A Doenjang Girl seeks luxury and is vain and proud.

== See also ==
- Female chauvinism
- Feminazi
- Misandry
