= Globalization in South Korea =

South Korea is the 5th largest export economy in the world and the 6th economic complexity according to Economic Complexity Index (ECI) with the top export destinations centralized in China ($149 B) with a total population of 51,324,823 in 2019.

== Overview ==
South Korea is one of the Asian countries that is affected by globalization.

Globalization is derived from Europe colonization of continents in Asia, Africa and Americas. However, it was underdeveloped until World War II, when globalization had been established worldwide. Globalization can be defined as an uneven process that focuses on transforming current social conditions of nationality into a connected international network. Furthermore, globalization creates a united and aligned world by combining existing and new practices. Globalization affects a wide-range of life aspects, primarily world economics because globalization has a purpose of outsourcing social network and existing connections to build exclusive connections between countries.

Moreover, the globalization phenomenon started in the Western region where it would eventually spread to Asian territory during the 1990s when the Asia economic crisis took place. Thus, Asia countries' viewed globalization as the key to overcoming financial distress and eventually adhering to western culture, which is also known as westernization.

=== Asia-Pacific globalization ===
Asia's economic growth during 1980s was accelerated due to the influx of foreign investment while during 1997 and 1998, a significant setback took place as the US dollar appreciated tremendously even in comparison to the yuan which led to financial distress in Asia and affected South Korea where similar debt structures were also recognised. Furthermore, South Korea's economy showed outstanding short-term foreign debt that was threefold higher and kept increasing over the year whereas exchange reserves showed insignificant changes; this caused the government to sign a bailout package with IMF as the country was currently unable to repay the appreciation of dollar loans to the debtholders. This package proposed to extend financial support to save the country from collapsing. Therefore, an agreement with IMF was made during 1997 where IMF proceeded on funding and advancing loans for South Korea that would be repaid in the future.

A miracle eventually emerged in Asia after the sudden economic depression as the revival was visible; this made Asian countries, especially the Four Asia Tigers, to surge and influence the global market which also known as East-Asian Miracle. The revival was influenced by western industries that adopted an open economy. This triggered the government to take a reformation approach that established the connection between openness and growth. Furthermore, this was executed with black-market and presence monopolies in exports while also using a reformed traditional approach.

The policies of South Korea and Taiwan have been similar to those of Japan in many respects, whereas the city-states of Hong Kong and Singapore have been extremely market-oriented and open, closer to laissez-faire than are western countries Although there are variations in the policies pursued, East Asian countries, more or less across the board, have moved in a liberal and outward-oriental direction. This made Asia-pacific regions become attractive towards the international investors while increasing the region's GDP.

=== Neo-liberal globalization ===
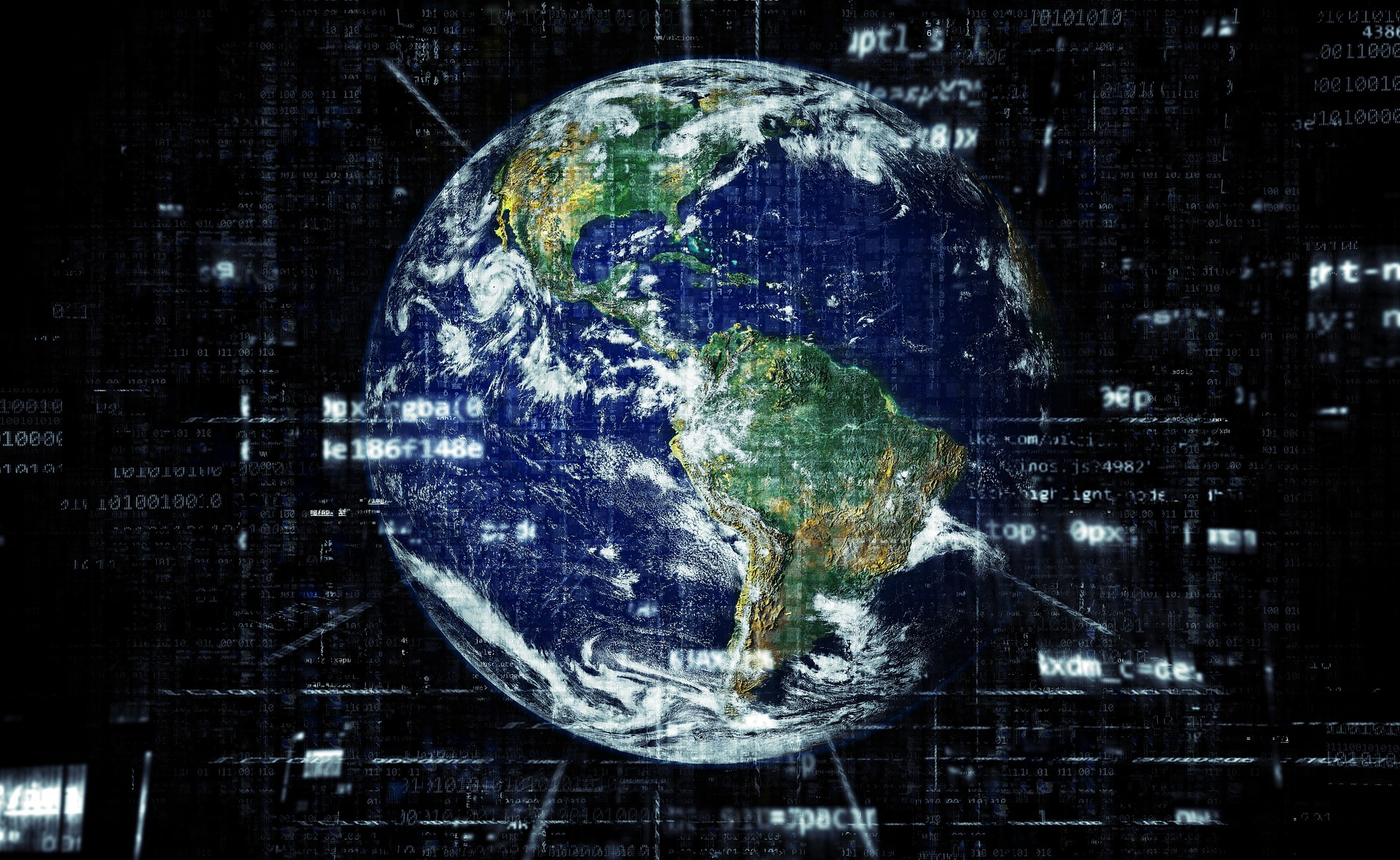
Globalization in South Korea started after the Asian Economic Crisis.

The 1997 Asian financial crisis created economic regression in Asia, including South Korea. South Korea had a high debt-equity ratio followed by low profitability due to inconsistency in corporate governance, which was the major obstacle. The government had to reform the country's policy to elevate South Korea's condition and was highly supported by many parties, especially, IMF and chaebols contributing to the domestic political, ideational and social conditions. Eventually, the South Korea GDP showed a satisfactory growth from economic regression to approximately 13% growth in GDP during the 7th quarter since the start of the 1997 Asian financial crisis. South Korea began to be involved in international agreements, such as the Asia-Pacific Economic Cooperation (APEC) in 1989 which was brought up during Australia Prime Minister Bob Hawke's, speech in Korea.

Furthermore, during the 21st century, during the Lee Myung-bak governance, globalization became the core policy, which was shown by Korea promoting "Global Korea" as the nation's slogan. This policy encouraged internationalization, participation in global movement and international assistance that would attract inward foreign investment. Moreover, South Korea applied neo-liberal globalization as it is a concept based on market-oriented ideas with loosened capitalism and accounts for the "free" market concepts. The government practised "deepening globalisation" to overcome the crisis, under-develop technology, and low-labour-cost issues to be a modern and globalized market leader. The implementation of the policy would drive Korea to be a globalized country. The neo-liberal policy was implemented in South Korea as there was a previous agreement with IMF during the financial crisis where South Korea must make a legal agreement to follow IMF regulations to reconstruct South Korea when the bailout package was provided. IMF agreement had effectively improved South Korea economy during the period.

Meanwhile, there was a significant change in working capital in South Korea after the neo-liberal policy was implemented a new type of working class was introduced, which was contingent workers. Contingent workers are freelance workers that have affordable wages and limited rights, gaining corporate awareness. Contingent workers had a significant growth accounting for 34% of total employment in the market. Korea's government agreed to implement contingent workers in exchange for workers' rights whilst increasing unemployment rate. Hence, due to the flexibility in the market, corporates made reformation in the company structure by replacing existing workers with contingent workers; this showed that government's bargain agreement with corporate entities was not succeeded. Hence, unemployment rate increased due to corporate influence over government. This caused separation between parties among standard workers and non-standard workers as difference protections and eligibilities between both parties creating borders. Contingent workers, which consisted of one-third of total labour, had not been provided with social protection and welfare. Thus, Korean labour faced challenges and new opportunities caused by globalization.

== Cultural development ==
Since South Korea has started globalization, Korea's economic focus shifted to media and cultural content during the 1990s, and Korean culture gained worldwide recognition during the 21st century. South Korea culture was favoured by other Asian countries, especially for television dramas that captured Asian viewers. One of the most successful television dramas that promoted Korea was Winter Sonata. It attracted a major popularity in Japan as 38% of the Japanese population watched the show. Winter Sonata had captured Japanese viewers with a well-written script, engaging chemistry and picturesque Korea scenery. This drama is one of the influencing Korean movies that contributed to the future development of South Korea's culture and film development. Furthermore, this phenomenon increased foreign enthusiasm to visit South Korea town and cities, which later known as Hallyu (Korean Wave) tourism. The Hallyu phenomenon happened due to the help of globalisation as it involved liberalization of markets and deregulation of culture segment. Hallyu has been part of the globalisation process in the way every country adapted to the changes. South Korea has been relying on manufacturing, and the South Korean government saw potential prospects on exporting cultural products, which gained public attention.

As a part of the Hallyu phenomenon, South Korea's music industry has also shown dramatic enthusiasm from the public showing an increase of approximately tenfold in a five-year span from US$20 million during 2008 to 230 million USD in 2012. The main reason is that Korean dramas' soundtracks (OST) have attracted audience to explore Korean music. This made cultural exports South Korea's major income. On the other hand, Korea's music (K-pop) has undergone cultural hybridity during globalization and cultural development itself as the nation's indulged western music characteristics combined with local culture as an act of modernization. Specifically, the music has shifted from traditional Korean folk song to a modern music style that indulged in visual and music harmonization of the singers.

During 2013, Korean music made further global expansion through the western part of the world, shown through many concerts held in New York, Paris and London. K-pop was first recognized by the world through several boygroups and girlgroups, such as Girl's Generation which was first published on YouTube and eventually gained positive responses among international viewers. Furthermore, the popularity of the K-pop industry skyrocketed even more due to the artist Psy with "Gangnam Style" in 2012 and becoming the first YouTube video to gain 1 billion viewers which opened the opportunity for K-pop to expand and Korean figures to gain recognition. As a result, many figures were invited to fashion shows, models and brand ambassadors of prestige brands; for example, Sehun, one of the most popular Korean idols, was invited to Louis Vuitton’s Resort 2019 show and won best-dressed man in attendance for two years. This shows that Korean Idols have gained recognition in the global world.

== Economic development ==
South Korea had gone through several economic development stages that eventually lead South Korea's economy to expand and become one of the most globalized countries. This is demonstrated by 72 percent of households owning broadband Internet. During the Japanese colonization, South Korea's economic structure shifted from agriculture to semi-industrial and grew rapidly. At the same time, during the Korean War the economy of both separated countries experienced turmoil due to exaggerate spending on military supplies. Eventually, South Korea experienced a turning point under the Rhee government as there were changes in political and economic structure reflected in exchange rates and export subsidies. During 1961, the Korean government took over banks and made them nationalized. This allowed the government to take on full control over the funds. Furthermore, South Korea's private firms capital structure showed a high percentage of external borrowings during 1963–1974. In addition to the subsidies, the government assigned private entrepreneurs to invest in new manufacturing branches. Thus, through subsidies from government, Korea's economic showed satisfactory figures with higher annual real GDP growth in comparison to the expected return, 8.5 percent and 7.1 percent, respectively.

Moreover, in the late 1990s South Korea experienced severe economic deterioration due to the 1997 Asian financial crisis. The government therefore, implemented a system that was based on collaboration between the state, banks and chaebols in which the government monitored and controlled called Korea Inc along with the implementation of Keynesian policy package and budget deficit. Furthermore, this policy had helped recapitalize financial institutions through a decrease in interest rates and injection of 64 trillion won (US$50 billion). South Korea implemented globalization heavily after the 1997 Asian financial crisis, exposing South Korea's economy to be embraced by other countries, creating a movement in capital goods and information across national borders. South Korea has shown tremendous improvement in economy as there is evidence indicating a decrease in unemployment, high wages and increased education standard.

Thus, Koreans have a high expectation for the improvement of the future standard of living and becoming one of the developed countries. South Korea became the 11th largest economy in the world in terms of gross domestic product in 2016. Despite the expectation redistribution of income, the outward-looking development strategy has negatively impacted the farmers due to competition with importers, causing South Korea to be highly dependent on agricultural imports. Another issue comes from income disparity between regions as there is significant difference in wages and workers' contributions. Moreover, Korea's transformation is defined as 'relative backwardness' as South Korea needs to come up with a new economic strategy to consider the long-term growth and catching-up as the reform program only considers short-term goals and will most likely destruct future growth prospect for the South Korean economy.

== Education development ==
Korea implements compulsory education policies for 6 years of primary education and 3 years of secondary education. The fact that education has been a crucial part in South Korea can be seen by the pressure and number of studying hours experienced by South Korean students. High school students in particular typically study from 8 a.m. to 4 p.m. and will proceed to study hall and leave after 10 pm. Furthermore, additional tuition is also part of the daily life of South Korean students. This phenomenon started in 1945 as mass primary education was introduced with less than 5 percent of the population having an elementary school education. There were massive improvements after five decades as most of the population was literate with 90 percent of the population graduating from high school. During this period, the number of South Korean students enrolling college was higher in comparison to most countries in Europe, and the quality of education regarding math and science skills in South Korea primary and secondary students outmatched other countries.

Due to the highly competitive market in Korea, companies perceive that higher education at elite institutions reflects individuals' values; therefore, graduating from elite schools indicates success in the labor market. The rapid growth of educational institutions in South Korea was occurred due to the change in social and economic structure from 1965 to 1990, changed the occupation structure. Furthermore, the changes involved the growth of white-collar occupations, which demand a highly educated labor force. South Korea's higher education system is based on the hierarchy of schools in which specific majors should be chosen during entrance. To improve the quality of education, the government developed teaching profession policies called 'Comprehensive Measures to Develop Teaching Profession', which were brought up during 2001. These policies involved increasing the wages and number of teachers and reducing workloads with the main focus on raising the education level of teachers to a master's degree.

Korea is one of the newly industrialized countries that is aiming to increase the standard of education, but there is a disparity of education quality between 'haves' and 'have-nots' due to the insufficient public education funds and the inability of the parents to provide after-school classes. South Korean education implements an unhealthy environment as students are forced to compete with each other, so one's success' is viewed as another's defeat. Students especially from middle-class families are constantly under pressure to study hard while the poor children will be left alone. This has raised an issue with human rights and democracy. South Korea's education is standardized and uniform, which violates students', teachers' and parents' rights as schools have become place where students experience long-hours of study, parents pressure students to study due to the Korean mindset of prestigious school increasing the hierarchy of individuals.

As enrolling in prestige school (SKY) is crucial for South Korean students, this has created a tremendous pressure on college entry examination, known as the College Scholastic Ability Test (CSAT), as all students aim to get a perfect score to be accepted into a top grades university. The government has taken the CSAT as a crucial event, and the National Police Agency is assigned to ensure that traffic and noise will not disrupt students. This pressure led to many students attempting suicide or having suicidal thoughts; based on a South Korean nationwide survey, 61.4% of students were stressed with 54.4% specifically under educational-factor pressure. Based on Kim and Park (2014), students in South Korea viewed suicide as a permissive solution that relates to the high suicide rate. The primary cause of suicide attempts between the ages of 13 and 19 was school performance concerning higher education. Moreover, the World Health Organization stated that students resort to suicide because they can take control of their lives. Thus, the government made a reformation act to change the educational system, such as attempting to ban afterschool institutes, which were opposed by many parties. Another approach was to apply a curfew and a new policy of Sooshimojib. This policy allowed students to apply to university degree programs based on merit, talent and achievement instead of weighing completely at CSAT score.
