= Glass Ceiling Index =

Annual index for visualizing the "glass ceiling"

Glass-Ceiling Index (GCI) is an annual index used to help visualize the glass ceiling metaphor by ranking OECD countries on their extant performance on gender equality. Created by The Economist in 2013, it assesses data on a variety of indicia related to gender in areas including higher education, labour-force participation, pay, childcare costs, maternity and paternity rights, business-school applications, and representation of women in senior government roles.

In the 2024 index, the countries where inequality was the lowest were Iceland, Sweden, Norway, Finland, and France. The countries lowest on the index were Israel, Switzerland, Japan, Turkey and South Korea. The index points to where and how women are still lagging their male counterparts in senior business roles. It is updated every year in a rank of 29 OECD countries.

It was launched in 2013 when there were five indicators and 26 countries, but today consists of ten indicators (higher education, labour-force participation, gender wage gap, GMAT exams taken by women, women in managerial positions, women on company boards, net child-care costs, paid leave for mothers, paid leave for fathers and women in parliament) for 29 OECD countries.

== Glass-ceiling index 2024 ==
View source data.

https://www.economist.com/graphic-detail/glass-ceiling-index

- Source: Statista - Glass-ceiling index 2021
