= Ilbe Storehouse =

South Korean internet forum

Ilbe Jeojangso
- Native name: 일베저장소
- Website type: Forum
- Available in: Korean
- Headquarters: 82, Seomun-ro 1ga, 56, Gyeongsang-Gamyeong street, Jung-gu, Daegu, South Korea
- Owner: Iseul Network Corp.
- Website: www.ilbe.com
- Commercial: Yes
- Registration: Optional for reading
- Launched: April 2010; 16 years ago

Daily-Best Archive (Korean: 일간베스트 저장소; Hanja: 日刊베스트 貯藏所; RR: Ilganbeseuteu Jeojangso) or Ilbe Storehouse (일베저장소; 日베貯藏所; Ilbe Jeojangso; lit. '"Daily Best Archive"'), also known as Ilbe, is a South Korean Internet forum that has a predominantly far-right userbase. The site was created in April 2010 and started as an archive of the daily best posts from the forum DC Inside.

The site's userbase is often described as having an alt-right, anti-feminist, anti-immigrant, and anti-LGBT stance, with elements of manosphere culture. Due to its vocal users and strong political and cultural influence, the forum has gained widespread attention from social critics, with some labeling it a social phenomenon. Some critics consider the site a Korean analogue of 4chan and 2channel.

== History ==
Ilbe, short for Ilgan Best (일간 베스트; 日刊 베스트; lit. 'Daily Best'), is a term for sections on the Internet forum DC Inside showing the most popular threads of the day. Ilbe was among several archive websites that aggregated deleted threads. In November 2016, the sections were removed from DC Inside after the media started claiming that the Ilbe Archive was the original website while DC Inside branched off of it.

The original website called Ilbe was launched by Moe-myeongsu (모에명수; 모에名手) in July 2009 as an archive of the DC Inside TV comedies gallery. In 2016, he attempted to sue the owners of a new Ilbe site, claiming they had mimicked his website while it was offline for maintenance.

In April 2010, another website with the same name was created by a user with the nickname SAD from the LG Twins gallery. In November, he retired from running the site and left it to the users active at the time: Bucheo (부처) and Sae-bu (새부, from 새침부끄; Saechim-bukkeu). Bucheo would later also leave the site due to military conscription, while Sae-bu would hire operators, programmers, and other staff to run the site. A year later, it was reorganized as an independent forum.

In December 2012, the site had over one million registered users. In April 2015, it reached over 2 million accounts. In September 2016, it had over 20,000 viewers at peak hours. Even in the mornings, when the number of viewers was minimal, the viewer count exceeded 10,000 people. According to the website administration, this data did not include mobile users, who made up 65% of total traffic.

In 2016, when the Park Geun-Hye scandal happened, the site's audience reduced significantly, going from 700,000 daily viewers in September to 520,000 in December. Concurrent views at peak hours also decreased to 10,000 views.

== Structure ==
The website has very few rules, but it does prohibit users from mentioning each other by their username or getting too close to each other to prevent new users or dissenters from being down-voted indiscriminately by existing users. This policy promotes anonymity and equality. In contrast, on other popular Korean forums, older users are respected more and hold greater authority during discussions. The site is largely unmoderated, with an exception for cases that may result in litigation or cases in response to complaints.

An account can be created with just an email address; the site doesn't require any documents or an ID number for registration, unlike other Korean websites. Users begin with a reputation of one, but can descend to zero as a result of downvoting by other users. Registration is required to post but not to view the boards, except for the NSFW boards. An exception is the Random chat (잡담) board, which doesn't require an account—users are named "Anonym" followed by a random number. It was created for users who were tired of the Jjalbang board's obsession with politics, but it's not nearly as popular.

Jjalbang (짤방-유머; jjalbang-yumeo, Memes and Humor) is the most active board on Ilbe. Popular posts are featured on the Daily Best (일간베스트) boards, but may return to Jjalbang if they receive too many dislikes. Like and dislike buttons on the board are named to the daily best! (일베로; ilbe-ro) and democratization (민주화; 民主化; minjuhwa). Only registered users can vote, and users with a high reputation can vote twice.

The Politics board was created to separate serious political posts from general forums, but it later became a distinct community, often antagonizing the Jjalbang board, which often features political memes. Politics favors Park Geun-hye, while in Jjalbang, Lee Myung-bak is preferred. In 2020, a core of long-time users migrated to DC Inside, initially to the Wuhan Minor gallery, and then to the US Politics Minor gallery.

The Animation board is often described as the center of Ilbe. Its main topic is Japanese anime, but other topics are discussed, and the board is often compared to the Random board. Users on the Animation board tend to socialize more than other users; they gather in KakaoTalk chats to talk and play games, despite moderator efforts to prevent this. The board antagonizes the Girl groups and artists (걸그룹/연예인) board, not only because it is considered a 3D reservation, but also due to the gap between Japanese and Korean pop culture.

== Subculture ==
A large part of Ilbe's subculture comes from the users' collective identity as losers: until the founding of the site, most of the large Korean forums were left-leaning and hostile to moderate right-wing opinions. Thus, its userbase has embraced many of the derogatory terms used to refer to them, such as Ilgay (일게이).

The site inherited a large part of its subculture from DC Inside. Many controversial memes originate from DC Inside, including Roh Moo-hyun memes from DC Inside's Happhil gallery, as well as hong'eo (홍어; 䱋魚; lit. 'skates', a slur targeting Jeolla people) and eomuk (어묵, derogatory term used to refer to Sewol ferry disaster victims) from the Basketball gallery.

Users are known for redacting well-known logos of organizations like universities, government structures, large private companies, as well as movie posters, and then adding tiny hints consisting of Ilbe's initials, Roh Moo-hyun's face, and other memes. Occasionally the media pick up such images and use them in reports. Evidence of such uses is recorded on the site in a distinct genre of posts called Broadcast proofs (방송 인증).

Another type of popular post is Dongmuljup (동물줍; lit. 'animal picker'). It features users picking up street animals, usually birds and cats, but sometimes strange and exotic animals. The ironic term Saramjup (사람줍) describes reporting drunk people who have fainted on the streets to the police. The users who do that are termed Haeng-gays (행게이, from 행동하는 회원; lit. 'members in action').

Sniper posts (저격글) are also common on the site. They discuss posts on the site or other websites to analyze them or expose their flaws. They often feature investigations of posted photos and clues to determine where and how they were taken.

The site has been compared to 4chan and 2channel.

== Political stance ==
=== Background ===
The site's userbase is often described as having an alt-right, anti-feminist, anti-immigrant, and anti-LGBT stance.

Ilbe's users generally lean to the conservative right politically, and their opinions and behavior have attracted significant controversy, from both the mainstream media and the political left.

Prior to the 2008 US beef protest in South Korea, opinions of right-wing supporters were mostly disregarded or criticized, because most South Korean websites at the time were dominated by left-wing users. Out of 12 major community websites in South Korea, only Ilbe and DC Inside possessed a right-wing political leaning. After the protest, many right-wing internet users began to express their opinions on the internet. DC Inside and Ilbe grew quickly as myriads of new right-wing users registered.

As Ilbe was one of the first major online communities in South Korea with a distinctively right-wing tone, it has been noted as a haven for the right-wing on the internet. The site's ideology is sometimes described as "rationalism" by its proponents, treated as a countermeasure against alleged left-wing propaganda, specifically false information about the right.

=== Criticism of Korean leaders ===
The Ilbe community achieved notoriety among Koreans making fun of the late former president Roh Moo-hyun. The political parties have criticized Roh and other political leaders through many forms of media, such as comedy, parody music, and spreading rumors on social media. Users make an Ilbe "theme song" every year, and they regularly parody popular songs with lyrics that criticize leaders. Users compose their parody songs as propaganda to attract people to join the community. The songs contain exaggerated expressions of political leaders and colloquially refer to them as MC Muhyeon (Roh Moo-hyun), DJ Daejung (Kim Dae-jung), MC Jong-Un (Kim Jong Un), and MC Geunhye (Park Geun-hye). Users also call 23 May "The day of Gravity", making fun of Roh's death by claiming that gravity killed him. One of their notable memes is the "Noala", an image of Roh with a photoshopped koala face. Users also created the label Unji (운지; 隕地, composed of hanja characters meaning 'to fall' and 'ground', a reference to Unjicheon beverage promotion clips). A distinct part of the site's slang is the -no (노) verb ending, referencing Roh's surname.

On January 25, 2018, a poster showing Roh making the Ilbe hand sign appeared in Times Square, New York. Users claimed to have posted the advertisement to commemorate the birthday of then-president Moon Jae-in. The advertisement also featured Noala and Unji memes.

On November 7, 2013, former first lady Lee Hee-ho, whose husband was former president Kim Dae-jung, accused some users of degrading deceased president Kim by spreading false information.

Presidents with popular support on the site are called gakha (가카, corrupted from 閣下 각하; lit. 'Your Excellency', an obsolete title associated with dictatorship). It was initially used to refer to Lee Myung-bak, who purportedly planned to restore the title, and then it was used for Park Chung Hee (원조가카; 元祖閣下; wonjogaka; lit. 'original gakha') and his daughter Park Geun-hye (레카; leka, short for 레이디 가카; leidi gaka, i.e. "Lady Gakha"). The term 갓카; gaska, with 갓 being the Korean transliteration of the English word God, is also used to imply the president possesses omnipotence. Like most South Korean right-wing political communities, former right-wing presidents Syngman Rhee, Park Chung-hee, and Chun Doo-hwan are heavily praised by users.

=== Denial of Gwangju Uprising ===
Despite the South Korean government's official recognition of the Gwangju Uprising as a democratic movement, Ilbe's userbase is extremely critical of it.

The May 18 Memorial Foundation, one of the memorial organizations for the uprising, announced that the site was spreading conspiracy theories, such as North Korean special forces being involved in the uprising; that the uprising was a heavily armed riot; that military suppression against citizens was justifiable; and that the 5.18 Special Law (5.18특별법), which pays respect to the uprising, is unconstitutional. Users label some journalists, like Monthly Chosun's former chief editor Cho Gap-je, as jwappal (좌빨; '[pro-North Korea] leftist') due to their support of the uprising.

=== Hatred towards the Honam region ===
Most Ilbe users have an intense dislike for the Honam region, historically known as Jeolla, in southwestern South Korea. Reasons cited include the fact that Honam had a 98% vote for a regional left-wing party candidate Kim Dae-jung, and the belief that the Gwangju Uprising has been glorified by those living there, to the extent that all other moments in the history of Korean democratization are overlooked, and the belief that it was a riot instead of a democratization uprising or movement. The intense dislike manifests as verbal attacks against Jeolla and related political figures.

=== Misogyny ===
Ilbe users think that women should be deferential to men. They take a hostile attitude toward types of South Korean women that they deem undesirable, and express antipathy towards them. Users label women who do not conform to such gender norms with the derogatory term gimchinyeo (김치녀; lit. kimchi woman), which is a reference to their national food, kimchi. Anna Louie Sussman of The Atlantic noted that the community contained many elements of manosphere culture.

== Criticism ==
Shin Hye-sik, a representative of the right-wing Dokrip Newspaper said that "[Ilbe users] should apologize for their problematic claims". Kim Young-hwan, a former pro-North activist, said "Right-wing is an attitude to inherit conservative awareness, but in this criteria Ilbe is not right-wing. Ilbe's radical argument will escalate social chaos". Yoon Pyong-joong, professor of Hanshin University, defined Ilbe's far-right extremism as "not worth discussing at all". They all believed Ilbe should be criticized by public argument instead of by legal action. In 2013 conservative magazine Shindonga released a special section to criticize Ilbe, describing it as "close to fascism rather than normal right-wing" and "antisocial". Japanese journalist Yasuda Goichi, the author of The Internet and Patriotism (Netto to Aikoku), viewed Ilbe as similar to Zaitokukai, a Japanese anti-Zainichi far-right online community.

One sexual assault counsellor said, "It is the combination of [the] commodification of women and peer culture which lies beneath Korean society", and women's organization activist Lee Yoon-so said, "Ilbe seems to express misogyny behind anonymity, and enjoying its propagation". Misogyny is expressed through Ilbe's subculture, including slang.

The lack of moderation sometimes results in illegal and harmful behavior, including defamation and harassment. The users' actions are routinely disapproved of by Korean officials. A notable case was when the Korea Communications Standards Commission (KCSC) requested that Ilbe regulate its problematic content that was "harmful for teenagers". On the other hand, the site has been praised for its anonymity and open expression of right-wing opinions: Ahn Hyung-Hwan, a spokesman for the right-wing Saenuri Party mentioned Ilbe as a "free space where innocent people can speak their minds freely". In a parliamentary inspection held in October 2013, a member of the Democratic Party, Yu Seung-hui, described Ilbe as "antisocial". He released information from the KCSC, including hundreds of submitted complaints about harmful content on the site promoting suicide, crime, drug usage, sexism, and violence, as well as defamation and discrimination against left-wing politicians and the Jeolla region.

As some of the users engage in harmful behavior both online and offline, the site has acquired a generally negative image. Thus, users tend to not reveal they are an Ilbe user in the real world to avoid ostracization. Users devised a hand sign that represents the Korean initials of the site's name to discretely indicate they use Ilbe.

At times, Korean celebrities have accidentally used Ilbe terminology on social media, leading people to think they are site members. To avoid being misunderstood as a site member, artists and companies add disclaimers to their products and publicly deny their affiliation. For example, the agency of K-pop dance group Crayon Pop described the site as "antisocial" while denying alleged involvement with it. Despite that, Crayon Pop artists became icons on the site, and its users started massively purchasing their albums. Korean professional gamer Hong Jin-ho denied his alleged involvement with the site, writing "I have never visited Ilbe. I heard about Ilbe and it is disagreeable. Such allegations are disgusting." on his Twitter account. Conservative Saenuri Party member Kim Jin-tae raised controversy when he accessed the site with his laptop during a parliamentary inspection at the National Assembly.

== Controversies ==
Ilbe users have organized mass protests that included singing Ilbe songs in city squares, and as a result, many users were tried for degrading the public order. On 28 November 2013, the first trial was conducted for defamation committed by a user who injured the honor of a Gwangju Uprising victim by describing a photo of his coffin as a "cash delivery". The offender said that he felt sorry for his actions and had sent an apology to the victims by phone call, but the organization related to Gwangju Uprising victims said there was no such apology. He requested the jurisdictional transfer of his case from Gwangju District Court to Daegu District Court and it was accepted.

The site also caused controversy for mocking the death of boy-band singer Lim Yoon-taek.

In April 2013, after Anonymous Korea released the membership list of Uriminzokkiri, Ilbe users engaged in a witch-hunt of many people from the list, decrying them as "communists" and "North Korean spies".

After the Seoul National University Student Council's declaration of protest against the 2013 South Korea election meddling scandal, a user released photos of some council members and stated, "I don't care whether you guys lynch them or not". The council stated that they were considering a lawsuit against the site.

On 30 September 2013, a 32-year-old male Ilbe user protested in front of Ewha Womans University. He hung a cardboard sign around his neck with derogatory messages written about Ewha University students, comfort women, and other Korean women. Some comments related to women's genitalia while others stated that such women were "communist" and "pro-North Korea". He was fined ₩1,500,000 by the Seoul West Prosecutor's Office, but he blamed this on "false accusation".

On 7 November 2013, former first lady Lee Hee-ho, whose husband was former president Kim Dae-jung, accused some Ilbe users of defaming deceased president Kim by spreading false information.

On 10 December 2013, an Ilbe user claiming to be an employee of the Comotomo feeding bottle company alleged that he interrupted the manufacturing process by sucking on feeding bottles. He confirmed his employment at the company by uploading his photo on Ilbe under the title "Titty Party" and commented, "Sometimes I suck this feeding bottle when I miss female breasts so much". His post raised outrage in the childcare community, for his vulgarism and hygiene concerns. Comotomo Korea released an official apology for the controversy and mentioned their employment of the individual was a mistake. The employee's accident report was revealed, in which he confessed: "I submitted vulgar contents on Ilbe. I caused economic and mental damage to the company and consumers for my own entertainment. The feeding bottle controversy that I created is totally false and I will take any legal responsibility."

The Seoul Central District Court accepted a provisional injunction against Ilbe. It was petitioned by a critic of the site who was degraded and threatened by its users. As a result, the site was forced to delete some offending content.

Some police officers and soldiers publicly described former presidents Chun Doo-hwan and Park Chung Hee as "patriotic" on Ilbe, which caused controversy because they violated the political neutrality required for public officers. In another instance, a police officer described left-wing protesters as "rioters" on the site. He was sent to the Yongsan police office disciplinary committee.

Some Ilbe members allegedly registered on K-pop band SHINee's official fan site, Shinee World, to post defamatory comments about Jonghyun after he voiced his support for a student cause in support of gay rights. Moreover, they posted obscene photos with offensive captions related to women's bodies on the fan site.

In 2016, after the femicide incident at Gangnam Station, Ilbe Storehouse users have confronted the mourners, carrying anti-mourner or misogynist messages. One of the users held a sign saying "Carnivores aren't the problem—animals that commit crimes are the problem... A Zootopia Korea without prejudice or bias. Currently ranked number one in the world for public safety, but let's make an even safer Korea together—men and women alike."

In August 2017, Gi Maeng-gi, author of the Naver webtoon My ID is Gangnam Beauty, filed a misdemeanor complaint against an Ilbe member for making malicious posts about her and her feminist views on the site. The offending individual later posted a copy of the complaint on Ilbe under the title "I was sued by a webtoon writer", and he accused the prosecutor of being biased.

=== Poster vandalism ===
In December 2013, some Ilbe users vandalized hand-written posters in universities and colleges around South Korea which criticized political indifference, social disharmony, inequality, South Korea spy allegations, an ongoing rail strike, and other political and social issues. The posters originated from Korea University and spread among some other Korean universities. The posters were seen as far-left, communistic, and pro-North Korea by the users involved.

The posters on the Korea University campus were vandalized by Ilbe users. A user confirmed his participation in the vandalism by uploading his photo online with sexually degrading comments against the original writer of the poster. After it became controversial, he revealed his identity and uploaded an apology for his actions, but also announced that he would accuse people who degraded him and his actions.

Similar vandalism is ongoing nationwide such as at Busan University, Hannam University in Daejeon, and Sogang University.

Ha Tae-keung, at the time a member of the conservative Saenuri Party, described Ilbe users who committed such vandalism as "losers".

=== Hacking cases ===
In 2012, some anonymous Ilbe users attempted an XSS attack against Todayhumor, a website with a left-wing stance. The administrator of Todayhumor announced that he would consider legal action against Ilbe.

An unknown hacker group made a distributed denial-of-service attack on Ilbe on 7 April 2013. The attack was reported as possible revenge by Anonymous for Ilbe's vandalism in the #OpIsrael IRC. Anonymous Korea claimed on its Twitter account that it was not involved with the attack on Ilbe, but mentioned that the site's members entered the chatroom used by Anonymous hackers, used insulting language, and spammed the chatroom. The relationship between Anonymous Korea and Anonymous remains ambiguous.

=== Sewol ferry victims defamation ===
In September 2014, when the parents of the victims of Sewol ferry disaster protested with public hunger strikes, over 100 Ilbe users went on "binge eating" events in front of them.

In January 2015, an Ilbe user posted a photo of himself in a Danwon High School uniform eating eomuk fish cakes. He was demonstrating the Ilbe hand sign and titled the post "I have eaten my friend!" (implying the fish which ate the corpses of Sewol victims was now in the eomuk). The post was disseminated on social media, and the victims of the Sewol disaster were labelled eomuks and odengthang (eomuk soup). The police arrested a 21-year-old person surnamed Kim, and his mother publicly apologized. The words eomuk and odengthang were banned on the site.

=== Harassment cases ===
Ilbe users have posted pornographic images of middle school and high school girls, including their family members, to the website.

On 22 November 2013, a student of Kangwon Provincial College and self-proclaimed Ilbe user, sexually harassed a female Buddhist monk on Twitter with comments about her virginity. Three days later, the monk Hyo-jeon asked for follow-up action from the president of the college, but the user did not apologize and continued to insult her. Following the controversy, he deleted his Twitter account and the president of the college gave an official apology.

In 2017, JYP Entertainment took legal action against an Ilbe user after they threatened to kill TWICE member Mina.

In October 2018, an Ilbe user uploaded a photo of an elderly naked woman in a post titled "32-year-old Ilgay saved his pocket money and ate 74-year-old Bacchus grandma" (32살 일게이 용돈 아껴서 74살 바카스 할매 먹고 왓다). This post contained a story of a visit to a prostitute. It was revealed that the story was fictitious. The first person to post this picture online was a 46-year-old Seocho District Office employee.

In November 2018, an Ilbe user uploaded erotic photos of a girl in a post titled "Girlfriend proof" (여친인증; 女親認證; yeochin-injeung). A series of similar posts followed it. The police investigated and identified fifteen posters, thirteen of which were arrested. Six of them confessed to posting their real girlfriends, while the rest posted images found on the Internet.

== See also ==
- Conservatism in South Korea
- Idaenam
- Minjuhwa
