= Doenjang girl =

South Korean pejorative term for women

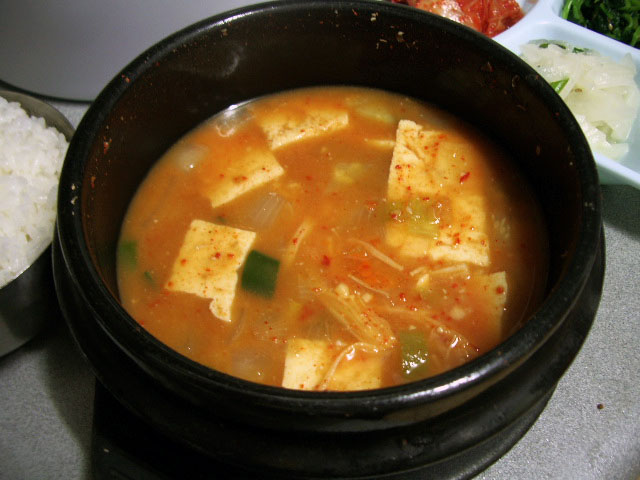
Doenjang jjigae is one of the cheapest meals in South Korea

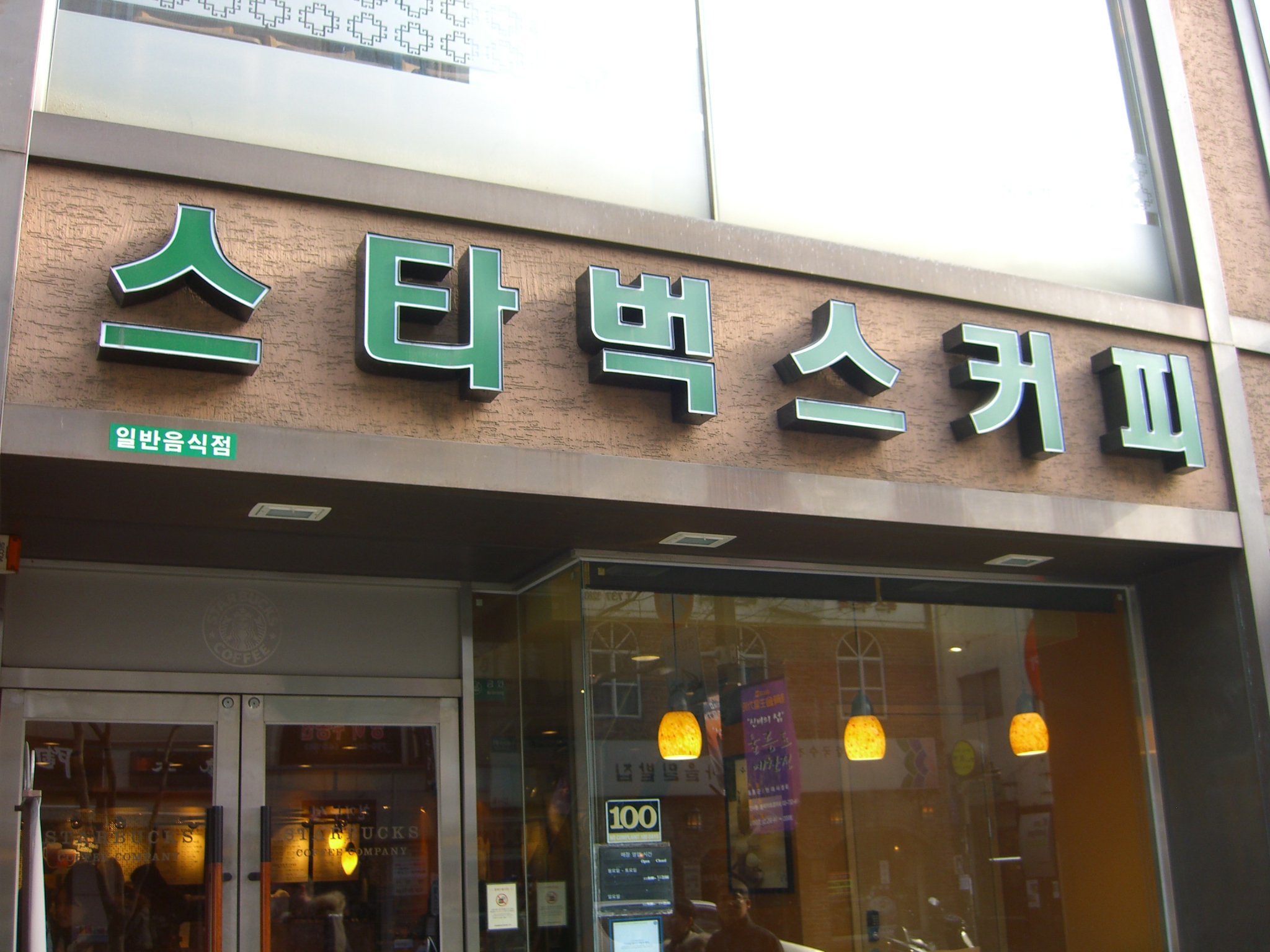
Starbucks in South Korea is a luxury commodity

Doenjang girl or doenjang woman (Korean: 된장녀; RR: doenjang nyeo) is a pejorative neologism used in South Korea to criticize women who "[scrimp] on essentials so they can over-spend on conspicuous luxuries". Doenjang is Korean fermented soybean paste. The term mocks a woman for eating a cheap meal (doenjang-jjigae is one of the cheapest meals in Korea) so she can buy something expensive. A large part of the song "Gangnam Style" is a parody of this stereotype.

The term first entered the language after Korea's early-2000s economic upswing. According to Jee Eun Regina Song, the concept of this woman is "best exemplified by the Starbucks cup in her hand". In South Korea, Starbucks symbolizes aspirational wealth and drinking Starbucks coffee is a status symbol; Seoul as of 2015 had more franchises than any other city in the world. Coffee after 1999 became a symbol of class.

According to the BBC, the term is inherently sexist; according to Song, the issues are both of gender and class. The BBC said that the term refers to the idea that "no matter how many Chanel bags she buys, she'll never be able to disguise her 'Korean-ness', and that this kind of spending was something to be mocked." There is a male equivalent in the form of doenjang nam (된장남), though it is less used than its female counterpart.

== See also ==
- Princess sickness
