= Korean Women Workers Association =

Women's organization in South Korea

The Korean Women Workers Association (KWWA or Han'guk yŏsŏng nodongjahoe 한국여성노동자회) is an organization in South Korea dedicated to advancing the human rights for working women and promoting gender equality. KWWA offers leadership training and monitors the effects of government policies on women workers.

It was the first national women workers association in Korea. KWWA is also one of the founding members of the umbrella organization of the Korean Women's Associations United (KWAU).

== Historical background ==
After the end of the Korean War, South Korea tried to rebuild the nation. Besides the dictatorial characteristics of Syngman Rhee and Park Chung Hee's administrations, women, mostly highly educated women, started to work towards establishing gender equality in South Korea. They created women's organizations, such as the Korean National Council of Women in 1959.

After the Park regime established its position in power, it allowed some conservative organizations to exist, as long as they did not show hostility to the government's policies and aimed to support the state.

Starting from 1963, Park's regime also promoted the industrialization of Korean society; women factory workers played a significant role in developing the South Korean economy and the democratisation of Korea. They were low-wage workers, often working under severe conditions, which caused many health issues. Even though Park's regime regulated anti-governmental organizations, women factory workers began to raise their voices in the 1970s in order to improve their working conditions and establish labor rights. The women workers' movements caught the attention of the South Korean public and led to the progressive and grassroots democratization movement in the 1980s. The movement gathered different types of people in terms of gender, class, age, marital status, and religion. Women activists in the 1980s thought that social reconstruction was necessary in order to liberate women.

The democratization of South Korea was achieved in 1987. Labor protection laws, such as the Equal Employment Act, were enacted as well. The law was meant to respond to demands from inside the country as well as to pressure from the international community. However, male workers started to show their presence as a dominant group of workers, especially after the late 1980s. As a result, the Korean Women Workers Association (KWWA) was founded in 1987 to unite women workers and establish their rights. The founding members included both intellectuals and working-class women who actively participated in the resistance movement in the 1970s and 1980s.

== History ==
In South Korea, before labor reforms, women who got married or who had children were forced to retire. In order to organize women into already established trade unions, the KWWA was founded in 1987. KWWA addressed issues that were being ignored by male-dominated unions which many women had already joined. In addition to organizing blue collar workers, KWWA organized those who were unemployed, domestic workers and other informal jobs.

Shortly after their formation, KWWA played a large role in supporting the passage of the Equal Employment Act in 1987. In 1989, The KWWA staged a protest by occupying a factory in Masan and living there. Also in the 1980s, KWWA were responsible for Nike partner factories raising the wages of workers in their facilities.

In 1990, they helped get the Infant Care Act passed. By 1993 KWWA affected the workplace with daycare centers being built near workplaces. In 1996, a former worker from the Committee of Asian Women (CAW), Maria Chol-Soon Rhie, became the chair of the organization.

KWWA has been a standard for other Asian countries to look to for best practices in improving equality in the workplace. In 2007, the organization celebrated its 20th year anniversary.

== Goals ==
After the democratization movement in the 1980s, South Korean society shifted to focus on the simin (civilized) ideal and slightly moved away from militant and anti-governmental ideals. Correspondingly, women's associations also changed their attitude to work closely with the government and expanded their targets and goals.

After the 1990s, the KWWA tried to work for the rights of women workers, as well as against the structural subordination of women that persisted in the society. The KWWA created the Korean Women Workers Association United in 1992 to organize its regional branches in Seoul, Incheon, Pusan, Bucheon, Sungnam, Kwangju, and Machang.

The KWWA's successes included the prohibition of sexual violence and indirect gender discrimination during the employment process under the Equal Employment Act in 1999. Also, it expanded the duration of maternity leave from 60 to 90 days in 2001. The KWWA continuously monitors government policies in order to reflect the demands of marginalized women workers in the political sphere. The KWWA and its affiliated organization Korean Women's Association United registered their names and were officially acknowledged by the government in 1995.

When the Korean economy experienced a crisis in 1997-1998, women workers often became victims of job dismissals and tended to become irregular and temporary workers. The Korean government supported the layoffs of workers in order to overcome the recession and keep the country's competitiveness in the global economy. Women were considered to be responsible and suitable for taking care of the children and family, instead of working outside their homes. The patriarchal stereotype in South Korean society encouraged women workers to engage in unstable jobs.

Under these circumstances, the KWWA established Korean Women's Trade Union (KWTU) in 1999 to unite and work on the issues of irregularly employed women workers. The KWWA worked with the KWTU and provided vocational training, child-care support, and counseling systems to help women workers. At the same time, The KWWA provided political education to allow the workers to learn about the necessity of collective union activism and to develop their leadership in labor organizations.

The KWWA refers to its future goals in a report published in commemoration of its 20th anniversary. The report claims that the KWWA needs to continue to establish the legal status and financial well-being of women workers. Not only that, it mentions that the quality of women workers' lives should also be protected. The KWWA believes that it needs to provide a better welfare system that allows more women workers to participate in activism without sacrificing their daily lives as mothers, wives, or low-wage workers.

The KWWA is now trying to deal with the institutionalized discrimination of women workers in a neoliberal, capitalist society. In the academic article "Korean Women Workers' Activism," the author, Park values the work of the KWWA and the KWTU for providing an environment in which irregular women workers can gather and find fellows who are willing to change the difficult working environment.

== Ongoing issues ==
There are critical discussions regarding the outcomes of the women's labor movements in the 1970s and 1980s. As the democratic movement in the 1980s was a collective and grassroots movement, Korean society sidelined the potential conflict between different social positions, such as class, gender, or political ideals. For example, the wives and mothers of male worker activists joined the democratic movement in the 1980s as they felt they were responsible for making a better society as mothers and wives. However, this attitude did not necessarily change gender roles and stereotypes in South Korea, which often stabilize the heteropatriarchal family system.

Also, the legalization of gender equality in South Korea was partly a way of accommodating the pressure of the international community and that of Korean women workers. Even though gender equality in the workplace was legally protected, it was not always applied to the everyday lives of women workers.

In addition, the KWWA revealed that there is not always enough communication between the younger and the older generations, as well as the activists who organize the association and the others who are in regional branches. The KWWA understands that there are differences in opinions and values between generations. The older activists tend to have an affinity with the progressive labor movement, whereas the younger generation tries to find other possibilities.

Jennifer Jihye Chun, the professor in the UCLA Asian American Studies Department and the International Institute, argues that there is a strategy that women's organizations should consider utilizing. Chun suggests that women's labor activists need to make the public realize the structural subordination of women while maintaining solidarity between people. Militant forms of activism, such as hunger strikes are sometimes perceived as outdated forms of resistance and do not necessarily lead to individual awareness.

Today, some NGOs acknowledge the lack of funding to organize and the lack of public awareness of the issues they raise; the burdens of activists who work full-time and who do not are polarized. The KWWA also insists on a limited financial reward for its activists, which compounds the difficulties of members in balancing their activism and domestic work. The KWWA is still working to deal with the structural subordination of women workers so that it can fill the gap between legislation and their everyday lives.

== See also ==
- Women in unions in South Korea
- Women in South Korea
