= Women in Korea =

Women in Korea may refer to:

- History of women in Korea
- Women in Joseon
- Women in North Korea
- Women in South Korea
