= History of women in Korea =

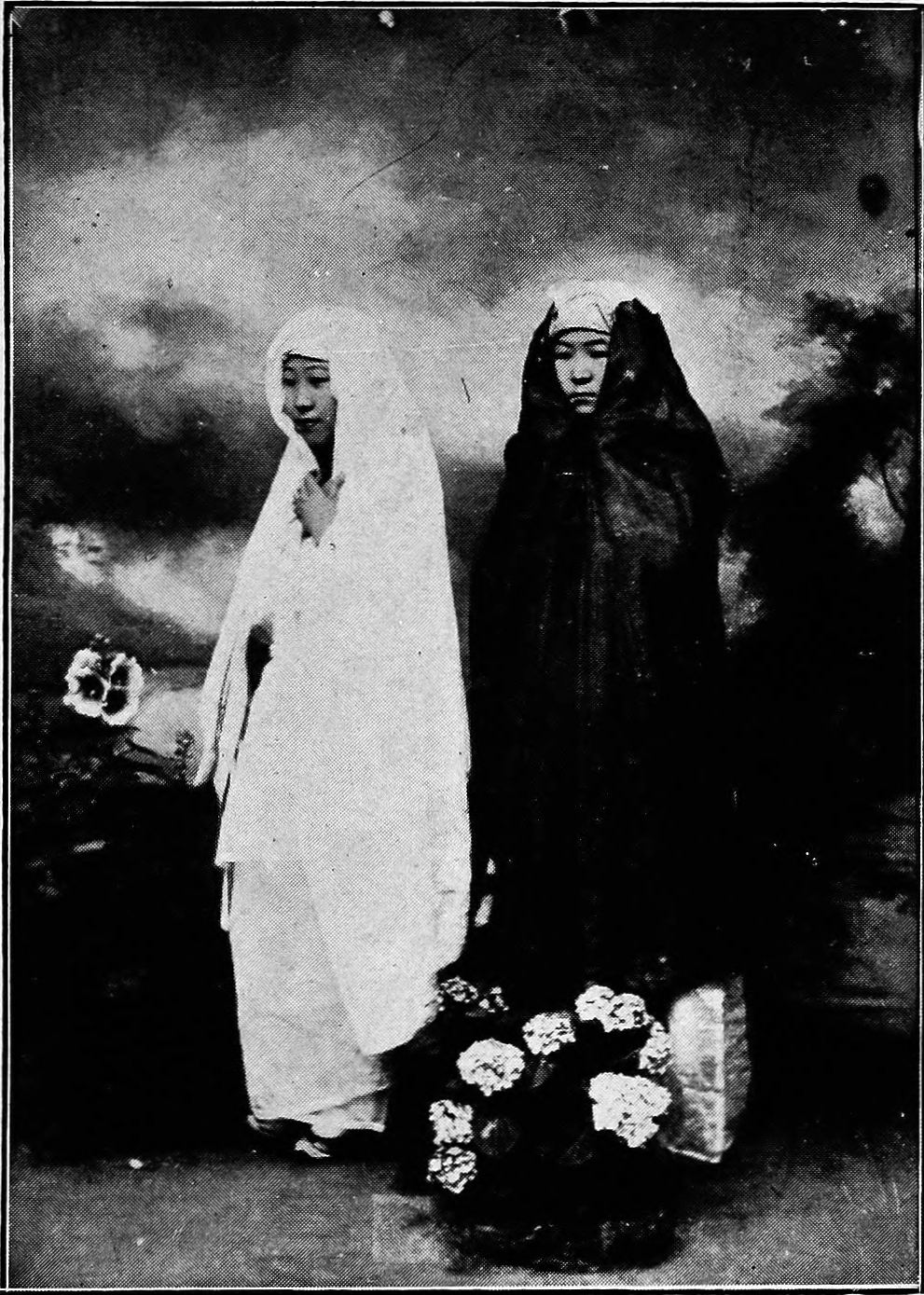
Village life in Korea - Seoul women wearing the veil, 1911.

Women in North and South Korea share roots in patriarchal Confucian traditions but diverged significantly after World War II, with North Korea mobilizing women for state-building under communist ideology, emphasizing collective duty and some public roles, while South Korea saw women's movements fighting for rights against discriminatory laws, eventually fostering civilian-led feminism, though traditional roles persisted, leading to a lack of work–life balance in the country and recent anti-beauty activism.

== Goryeo to Joseon periods ==
The transformation of the family from 918–1392 Goryeo to 1392–1897 Joseon periods caused the gradual decline of Korean women’s status and visibility in the public sphere. The most significant change was a shift from an emphasis on a matrilineal to a patrilineal structure of kinship and identity.

During the Goryeo period, newly married couples used to live with the bride's family, which offered numerous advantages for the women, not least of which was economic. A woman could safeguard her share of the inheritance she shared equally with her male siblings. Because of the autonomy women had during this period, they also focused on their personal beauty and appearance. The standards of beauty revolved around elegance, which shifted from the "mother earth" beauty that was seen in Three Kingdoms period (57 BCE - 668 CE). Goryeo women, depending on social status wore either, bright and colorful make-up if they were workers, or wore very light makeup and focused on having clear skin if they were in the ruling class. Women in the ruling class did however, during weddings would use a method called yeonji (연지; 臙脂). This was where red pigment from safflower would be applied to the forehead, cheeks, chin and lips.

In the Joseon period, the establishment of a patrilineal line eroded women's rights and privileges from the changing of residential arrangements to the rigid rule of primogeniture, which identified the eldest son as the principal heir, as considered important for the sustainability and continuity of the lineage. During this period, women were put into certain categories: those of the royal family such as the Queen and the King’s concubines, wives of men in the yangban class, women in the lowborn class, also known as the yangban’s female slaves, and those in uncommon professions such as physicians, shamans, entertainers, and palace women.

The moral of Confucianism imposed a strict division of the sexes, presumably to prevent adultery and other sexual misconducts. Women were forced to stay chaste and were not allowed to remarry if they were widows.

The institution of "Seven Evils Rules" (which included the inability to bear a son, disobedience to her parents-in-law, adultery, display of jealousy, chronic illness, theft, and loquacity) gave men the opportunity to use these clauses to divorce their wives.

=== Women in Joseon ===
An improvement in the status of women first appeared during the late 19th and early 20th centuries. A large number of Western Christian missionaries came to South Korea to set up modern schools. Some of these were established in order to educate women in diverse areas including literature, arts, and religion. Prior to this, most Korean women did not have any access to education. As a result of this education, Korean women became able to participate in political movements because those who received education also took part in teaching other women.

The Korean women's movement started in the 1890s with the foundation of Chanyang-hoe, followed by several other groups, primarily focused on women's education and the abolition of gender segregation and other discriminatory practices.

== Japanese occupation era ==
When Korea was under the colonial administration of Imperial Japan, many Korean women (numbering up to 200,000) were forced to work as comfort women in Japan's military brothels. Until the end of World War II, Korea was under Japanese occupation. Women participated in the independence movement against Japanese occupation during the 1910-45 period of Japanese colonisation.

When Korea became a Japanese colony in 1910 women's associations were banned by the Japanese and many women instead engaged in underground resistance groups such as the Yosong Aeguk Tongji-hoe (Patriotic Women's Society) and the Taehan Aeguk Buin-hoe (Korean Patriotic Women's Society). As a result, the role of women in society began to change.

== South Korea ==
After becoming independent from Japan, the Republic of Korea was established as a liberal democracy. Women were granted the constitutional right to equal opportunities and could pursue education, work, and public life. Several schools were founded for the education of women. Women educated in these schools began to take part in the arts, teaching, and other economic activities. They also engaged other women in the discussion of gender equality.

The percentage of women in professional fields has steadily increased which has resulted in significant contributions to society, especially in terms of increasing GDP. As they took a larger role in economic activities, the educational level of women also increased, providing additional opportunities for professionalization. Today, Korean women receive high levels of education and actively participate in a wide variety of fields, including education, medicine, engineering, scholarship, the arts, law, literature, and sports.

=== Women's movement ===
After the end of the War and the partition of Korea in 1945, the Korean women's movement was split. In North Korea all women's movement was channeled into the Korean Democratic Women's Union; in South Korea, the women's movement was united under the Korean National Council of Women in 1959, which in 1973, organized the women's group in the Pan-Women's Society for the Revision of the Family Law to revise the discriminating Family Law of 1957, a cause that remained a main focus for the rest of the 20th century and did not result in any major reform until 1991.

== North Korea ==
Women Perceived in North Korea

The way that Women in North Korea are perceived it depends on their status and roles. The higher up they are in government or officials the more "respect," they obtain by society. Throughout history, the Confucian patriarchal system influenced the way that men viewed women. Which in the Confucian patriarchal system men were viewed as superior then women. Women were also limited on activities such as education, politics, jobs, etc.

Role of Women During North Korea's Socialist Period (1945-1972)

During this period land was distributed equally to both genders, which in result women became landowners. Under the premodern patriarchal system, previously, women had no ownership rights but now they were recognized as equal and had same rights as men. Including areas such as politics, and in their social life. "The Democratic Women's Union of North Korea," was established to organize a women's movement and to show support towards each other. Kim II-Sung (who was a communist leader of North Korea from 1948-1994) was supportive of this movement for 2 reasons. He thought that women should unite and contribute to the building of the country and in order for women to participate in the realization of social emancipation.

Education

As you may know, North Korea's education is mostly focused on how to "obey," the leader instead of each person having their own ideas. North Korean government believed that mothers are responsible for the child's education, and that they needed to be fully aware that they need to contribute to their country. In 1972, the government gave conditions to its citizens in order for them to receive secondary education which offered and included more opportunities for higher education. This was a big step for women as they were now able to attend regular college courses. However, the real reason for the government to give such big opportunity to women was because they wanted more workers, so they offered education in order for women to work for them (government). In did increase women's participation in labor, status and the quality of females in the workforce.

== See also ==
- The National Women's History Exhibition Hall – Women's history museum in South Korea

== Bibliography ==
- David P. Baker and David L. Stevenson - Mothers' Strategies for Children's School Achievement: Managing the Transition to High School, in Sociology of Education Vol. 59, No. 3, Jul. 1986.
- Katrina Maynes, Korean Perceptions of Chastity ceptions of Chastity, Gender Roles, and Libido; F, Gender Roles, and Libido; From Kisaengs to the Twenty First Century, in Grand Valley Journal of History, vol. 1, n. 1, February 2012.
- Michael J. Pettid & Youngmin Kim - Women and Confucianism in Chosŏn Korea: New Perspectives, in Journal of Korean Religions Vol. 3, No. 1, Late Chosŏn Buddhism, April 2012.
- Park So Jin - Educational Manager Mothers: South Korea’s Neoliberal Transformation, in Korea Journal Vol. 47, no.3, 2007.
- Jesook Song - ‘A room of one’s own’: the meaning of spatial autonomy for unmarried women in neoliberal South Korea, in Gender, Place and Culture Vol. 17, No. 2, April 2010.
- Women of North Korea: A Closer Look at Everyday Life Kim Won-Hong (Researcher, Korean Women’s Development Institute).
