= Sunseong-hoe =

First women's organization in Korea

Sunseong-hoe (Korean: 순성회; Hanja: 順成會) alternatively called Suun Seong or Adoration Society was a Korean organization for women's rights, founded in 1896. It was the first women's organization in Korea.

The purpose was to emancipate women by education and make them participate in the movement to keep Korea free from the domination of foreign powers. This was in a period when modernization was thought necessary to avoid becoming a colony under Japan or any other foreign power. It was the start point of the Korean women's movement. It was followed by Chanyang-hoe in 1898, the Women's Society for the Payment of National Debts in 1907, as well as by the first nationwide women's organization Geunwoohoe in 1927.

== See also ==
- Yo-u-hoe
