= Role of women in the democratization of South Korea =

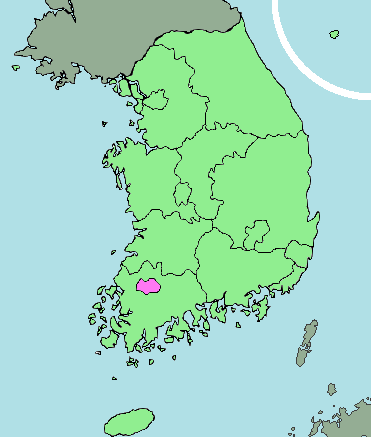
Gwangju (highlighted in pink), where the Democratization Movement occurred.

The role of women in the democratization of South Korea is a topic that has received little scholarly attention. Women's participation in civil society has contributed to the process of the development of democracy in South Korea. Additionally, the democratization movement can be described as increasing the participation of marginalized groups such as women. Democratization was an outlet for women to transform their grievances into actual collective action. Through democratization, these forms of activism became possible as the movement created numerous opportunities for civil society ("voluntary associations"). Although women have played a role in the democratization of South Korea, there were still internal and external problems that hindered their growth and development.

== Background information ==
The democratization movement is also known as the Gwangju Democratization Movement. This has been characterized as the transition from authoritarian rule to a democratic government. This movement started with the death of the President Park Chung-Hee in 1979. As a result, multiple social democratic movements emerged. As stated before, since there was an unforeseen shift of government rule, politics after his assassination became unstable. Democratization has been systematically maintained through masculine institutionalized politics, and women's participation hase been silenced. A term that has been circulating in South Korea since the inauguration of Kim Young Sam's government in 1993 has been "democratization", or minjuhwa. However, there are still doubts as to whether or not it benefits women empowerment. Due to the fact that democracy is usually inclined to patriarchy, according to Seungsook Moon, the shift to this form of government has left women in a season of instability. Owing to the detachment of South Korea from the U.S. troops, women's opinions are most effective. Katharine H.S. Moon argues that because of these features of the democratization movement of being "anti-troop...women's movements have narrowed the political space for gender-specific activism" and women's leadership addresses "the rights and needs for the very women whose lives are most intimately affected by the presence and conduct of U.S. troops." Korean women not only played a logistical support role in the Kwangju Uprising in 1980, but some female students also participated in street demonstrations. According to research, at least 23% of the arrested demonstrators were women, who broke through the military blockade by organizing medical teams and secret communication networks. Archival analysis shows that female participants mostly came from Christian student groups and used religious networks for cross-regional mobilization.

== Korean Women's Associations United (KWAU) ==
Women's groups started to gather in hopes of tackling gender inequality. One of the most popular groups was founded through Christian foundations. These women were opposed to the conservative state and aligned with feminist views. They focused on meeting the needs and interests of women who had experienced gender inequality during democratization, such as factory workers, housewives, etc. Throughout the process of democratization, the conflict between the Korean Women's Associations United (KWAU) and the state turned into negotiations instead. After the inauguration of Kim Dae Jung in 1998, women of the KWAU were chosen for government office. Due to this, KWAU began to pay a lot of attention to "local and national elections in the interests of influencing law-making and policy-making processes." Scholars, such as Seungsook Moon, claims that the political transition from authoritarian to a democratic government worked simultaneously to develop women's associations such as the KWAU.

=== Problems ===
1. Thin grass-roots base. This meant that the KWAU did not have much influence in politics yet.
2. Small membership: the KWAU had a low number of members.
3. Lack of resources and public interest in social activism

The evolution of sexual violence legislation reveals the dynamic interaction between the social movements and the legal system. According to Doug McAdam's political process theory, the KWAU used the political opportunity window to promote the enactment of the "Special Law on Punishment for Sexual Violence Crimes", introducing the core principle that non-consent constitutes a crime. Data from the Korean Institute of Criminology show that between 2003 and 2008, the conviction rate for sexual assault cases increased from 12% to 31%. This process confirms that the law is not only a goal of struggle, but also a tool for reshaping social cognition and collective action.

The media campaign rewrote the rules of public visibility for the issue of sexual violence. After the 2021 series Deserter Pursuit exposed the military sexual assault scandal, the number of sex crime reports increased sharply in a single month. Framework analysis shows that the series replaced the individual victim framework with a systematic narrative of state failure, validating the theory of unjust framework. However, the backlash from conservative media on the grounds of damaging the national image reveals that the campaign media both challenges the legacy of authoritarianism in the process of democratization and is constrained by the market logic of neoliberalism.

Persecution of Rape and Sexual Harassment in 2000 and 2005
	Year	Reported	Prosecuted	Non-prosecuted	Referred to Other Authorities	Prosecution Rate
Rape Semi-rape	2000	2,120	385	1,607	62	18.2
	2005	1,873	283	1,442	45	15.1
Sexual Harassment Semi-sexual Harassment	2000	1,933	411	1,444	29	21.3
	2005	3,554	1,205	2,224	60	34.0

This data shows how sexual crimes are rarely reported. The KWAU is working to eliminate discrimination against women in regards to their human rights.

== Women's Society for Democracy ==
In South Korea, the women's rights movement was mainly focused around "equity and labor exploitation." Those who supported democracy, like the Party for Peace and Democracy, were deemed as those who were anti-government. Women's Society for Democracy is one of the bigger branches of the KWAU and founded in 1987. This group is a multi-issued women's rights group led by Professor Lee Hyo Jae and the President of KWAU, Oo Jeong. They were modeled after the Women's Society for Justice and Equality, which failed due to internal issues. Such issues included disagreements between which topics were most important: social injustices like labor reform vs. political democratic reform. However, in order for these changes in equality to become a reality, radical women's groups in Korea state that things like general human rights issues, democratization, and the reunification of North Korea must occur first.

=== Focused issues ===
==== Labor rights ====
The fight for labor rights among women in South Korea has spanned decades, marked by milestones of resilience and persistent challenges. In the 1980s, women began playing a critical role in labor movements, particularly in industries such as textiles and electronics, where they organized strikes to demand fair wages and improved working conditions (Jcong-Lim, 2002). The activism of this era culminated in events such as the Great Workers' Struggle of 1987, a turning point in South Korea's labor history, which set the foundation for democratic labor unions and the recognition of workers' rights. Women workers were at the forefront of these movements, with figures like Kim Jin-Sook gaining national attention through her famous 309-day sit-in atop a crane in 2011, protesting the unjust dismissal of workers and becoming a symbol of resistance (Pareliussen, 2022). The Korean women's labor movement has systematically challenged gender pay gaps in the workplace through institutional negotiations and legislative advocacy. New institutionalist theory suggests that the collective action capacity of unions is key to breaking through structural discrimination. For example, in 2001, the Korean Women's Workers' Union (KWWAU) pushed for the amendment of the Equal Employment Act, forcing companies to disclose gender pay data and reducing the wage gap between men and women in the manufacturing industry. This process confirms Nancy Fraser's theory of participatory justice, which requires combining economic rights with political representation.

By the 2000s, the government began implementing measures like the Equal Employment Opportunity Act to combat gender discrimination, but patriarchal workplace cultures continued to hinder women's progress (Kwon and Doellgast 2018). Women like Kim Jin-Sook and Kang Churyong, whose activism dates back to the 1930s, represent the tradition of female-led labor advocacy in South Korea (Jcong-Lim, 2002). The implementation of vocational training policies has exposed the gender blind spot of human capital theory. Despite the 2008 "Female Career Promotion Law" investing $230 million in skills training, most of the courses focus on low-paying service industries (such as nursing and catering), which reinforces occupational gender segregation. Feminist economists point out that such policies ignore the entry barriers in the technology industry. This contradiction reveals that policy design needs to take into account both the industry structure and individual initiative. Despite these efforts, the OECD reported in 2022 that women still earned only 68.9% of men's wages for comparable work (Pareliussen, 2022). High-altitude protests—like those pioneered by Kim Jin-Sook—remain a powerful method for highlighting labor injustices, while grassroots feminist movements continue to push for cultural and systemic transformations to achieve gender equality (Yulee, 2021)

==== Prostitution ====
Prostitution in South Korea has long been a deeply debated and multifaceted issue, shaped by the intersection of socio-economic pressures, cultural norms, and legal frameworks. During the rapid industrialization of the 20th century, sex work became prevalent in red-light districts, especially around U.S. military bases. Women often turned to prostitution as a means of economic survival in a context of poverty and gender inequality (Kim, 2024). Recognizing the challenges posed by this sector, the South Korean government introduced the Anti-Prostitution Law in 2004, aiming to criminalize both buyers and sellers of sexual services. However, critics have argued that the law disproportionately penalized sex workers while failing to address the structural drivers that push women into the trade (Kim, 2024) Women's groups have redefined the issue of sex trafficking as the result of the failure of national governance. Combined with the theory of transnational advocacy networks, they have urged the South Korean government to adjust its policy focus. In 2004, the Korean Women's Association (KWAU) and international anti-trafficking organizations successfully lobbied the parliament to pass the Amendment to the Anti-Sex Trafficking Act, which for the first time included clients in the scope of criminal punishment. This strategy reflects the proposition of postcolonial feminist scholars that marginalized groups need to break through the governance limitations of national centralism through transnational alliances.

The advent of digital platforms has fundamentally transformed the prostitution industry in South Korea. By the 2010s, "room cafes" and online sex services emerged as alternative channels, allowing sex work to shift into private spaces and virtual domains that are harder to regulate (Becker, 2023). Advocacy organizations continue to call for the decriminalization of sex work, emphasizing the importance of protecting workers' rights and improving access to health services and legal safeguards. Current policies remain polarizing, with debates focusing on balancing moral concerns, human rights, and the realities of economic inequality (Kim, 2024). As South Korea navigates these issues, a more holistic approach to policy-making—one that considers social, economic, and gendered dimensions—appears crucial to tackling prostitution and its associated challenges effectively. The effectiveness of the retraining program highlights the inherent tension of development discourse. In 2010, the government and NGOs launched a beautician certification program aimed at helping sex workers transition, but a five-year follow-up showed that only a very small number of participants achieved stable employment. Ethnographic research points out that employers' implicit discrimination against former sex workers makes it difficult to translate certificates into actual opportunities. This dilemma echoes postcolonial critique, that development interventions may reproduce the otherness of marginalized groups.

==== Sex torture ====
Sexual torture has been a critical issue in Korea, particularly affecting women in vulnerable situations. In North Korea, reports from human rights organizations and survivor testimonies reveal systematic sexual violence against women detained in state facilities. These women, often accused of attempting to flee the country or engaging with foreign organizations, face inhumane conditions, including overcrowding, malnutrition, and constant surveillance by male guards. Accounts from survivors detail instances of sexual assault, forced labor, and physical abuse, highlighting the pervasive use of sexual torture as a tool of control and punishment (Lee, 2022).

In South Korea, while sexual torture is not as systematically documented, cases of sexual violence and abuse within certain institutions have surfaced. For example, technology-facilitated sexual violence (TFSV) has emerged as a significant issue, with women being targeted through digital platforms. A study published in Violence Against Women analyzed anonymous postings from victims of TFSV in South Korea, revealing the profound mental health impacts, including anxiety, depression, and suicidal ideation (Kim, Choi, and Champion, 2024). Additionally, workplace sexual harassment involving third parties has been examined in recent research, which highlights the necessity of reframing institutional measures and promoting cultural transformation to address systemic issues (Lee and Oh, 2021). Advocacy groups have called for stronger legal protections and support systems for survivors, emphasizing the need for gender-sensitive approaches to justice and rehabilitation.

==== Altering family law ====
The evolution of family law in Korea has been an important aspect in the fight for gender equality, reflecting the broader societal shifts toward dismantling patriarchal structures. Historically, the family-head system (hoju jedo), which designated the eldest male as the head of the household, symbolized the deeply entrenched gender hierarchy in Korean society. This system not only marginalized women but also restricted their legal rights in matters such as inheritance, marriage, and child custody. The abolition of the family-head system in 2005 marked a significant milestone, driven by persistent advocacy from women's rights groups and progressive legal reforms. This change was a direct response to the Constitutional Court's ruling that the system violated the principles of gender equality enshrined in the Korean Constitution (Kim & Lundqvist, 2023; Hyuna & Choe, 2023).

The legal practice of custody reform reveals the gap between formal equality and substantive justice. Despite the 2005 amendment that removed the maternal preference clause, courts still award most custody to mothers. Feminists criticize this phenomenon as the institutionalization of motherhood punishment, with society assuming that women should bear the responsibility of childcare.

The process of family law revision has exposed the deep contradictions between liberal jurisprudence and patriarchal traditions. Although the 2005 amendment established the principle of equal division of marital property in divorce, the patriarchal inheritance system remains untouched. It is difficult to achieve substantive equality if private sphere reform is divorced from the restructuring of power in the public sphere. However, KWAU, through a constitutional lawsuit in 2008, forced the Supreme Court to recognize the economic value of housework, laying a legal basis for subsequent struggles.

=== Other radical groups ===
==== Korea's Women's Workers Association ====
The Korean Women Workers Association (KWWA), founded in 1987, has played a central role in advancing gender equality and championing women's labor rights in South Korea. The association emerged during the nation's democratization movement, focusing on issues often overlooked by male-dominated unions, such as gender discrimination, inadequate maternity leave, and sexual harassment in workplaces. KWWA's efforts contributed to significant legislative advancements, including the Equal Employment Act and the Infant Care Act, which improved working conditions for women. Beyond legislative advocacy, the association provides services such as counseling, legal aid, and educational programs, empowering women across various industries and sectors.

The Korean Women Workers Association (KWWA) has practiced the model of intersectional labor movement. Drawing on race-gender matrix theory, KWWA linked the issue of overwork among female workers with family care responsibilities. During the 1997 financial crisis, the organization issued the "Declaration Against Flexible Working Hours," pushing the Ministry of Labor to reduce the legal maximum monthly working hours of female workers in the manufacturing industry from 234 hours to 201 hours. This strategy breaks through the class singularity of traditional trade unions and incorporates issues in the field of reproduction into the agenda of the labor movement.

In recent years, KWWA has adapted its advocacy strategies to address challenges brought by the digital economy and precarious employment. The rise of gig work and informal labor markets has created new vulnerabilities for women workers, prompting the association to expand its initiatives to include training and support tailored to these modern challenges. Additionally, KWWA has strengthened collaborations with international organizations to amplify its impact, advocating for systemic reforms that benefit women workers globally. A report by Friedrich-Ebert-Stiftung highlights the association's critical role in forming transnational alliances that foster deeper social and labor policy transformations.

==== Korean Catholic Farmers ====
The practices of rural women challenge the top-down style of development. The Korean Catholic Farmers Movement (KCFM), founded in the 1970s, was established as a response to the growing socio-economic challenges faced by rural communities during South Korea's rapid industrialization. The movement advocates for justice and equity in agricultural practices while empowering marginalized farmers. Women, often sidelined in traditional farming structures, became integral to KCFM's efforts through programs focusing on leadership development and gender equality. The movement actively promotes eco-friendly farming practices, aligning with global environmental initiatives like Pope Francis' "Laudato si", while addressing urgent issues such as food security, climate change, and landownership disparities. This holistic approach has strengthened community resilience and fostered a greater sense of solidarity among rural families.

The Korean Catholic Farm Women's Association (KCFW) introduced the Participatory Action Research (PAR) method to restructure the relationship between production and reproduction through organic agriculture training. The Ministry of Agriculture's assessment shows that farmers participating in this project saw their income increase by 58% between 2005 and 2010, far exceeding the income of farmers in government-led conventional poverty alleviation projects. From the perspective of post-development theory, the local knowledge production of grassroots organizations can deconstruct the technological hegemony of expert discourse.

The agricultural cooperative movement has reshaped the gender politics of market relations. Women farmers in Gyeongsangnam-do increased their direct sales ratio from 15% in 2010 to 63% in 2015 through the Community Supported Agriculture (CSA) model, resulting in an increase in the average annual income of the members. Women are using kinship networks to rebuild the moral economy and resist the encroachment of capitalized agriculture.

Over the years, KCFM has expanded its activities to include rural women's education and grassroots advocacy, enabling them to participate in decision-making processes traditionally dominated by men. Through its women's committees, the movement has implemented initiatives designed to educate rural women about their rights, improve their access to resources, and address systemic barriers to equality. Workshops and campaigns encourage women farmers to adopt sustainable agricultural practices while advocating for fair wages and improved working conditions. These efforts reflect the Catholic Church's broader commitment to social justice and the dignity of every individual, creating a platform for rural women to have their voices heard and their contributions recognized.

==== Women's Committee ====
Women's Committees in South Korea emerged during the 1980s as a vital component of the country's labor rights and gender equality movement. Initially established within unions and civic organizations, these committees sought to address issues faced by women workers, such as wage discrimination, maternity protection, and childcare support. Their early initiatives were instrumental in advocating for legislative reforms, including the Equal Employment Act, which aimed to reduce gender disparities in workplaces. In the 1990s, these committees expanded their influence to rural areas, collaborating with organizations like the Korean Catholic Farmers Movement to address the unique struggles faced by women in agriculture. This collaboration fostered a sense of solidarity between urban and rural women workers, highlighting the shared challenges of gender-based inequality.

By the 2000s, Women's Committees had broadened their scope to address emerging issues, such as sexual harassment and gender-based violence in workplaces. They played an important role in introducing gender-sensitive policies and creating safe spaces for women to report and seek support for workplace abuses. In recent years, the committees have embraced contemporary challenges, such as advocating for fair treatment of women employed in gig work or informal labor sectors. Their persistent advocacy continues to reflect a commitment to systemic reform and the empowerment of women in all aspects of social, economic, and political life.

The community safety project revealed the gender power structure in spatial politics. Based on the theory of spatial justice, the Women's Committee forced the Seoul Metropolitan Government to add 1,200 street lights and patrol posts by mapping female safety maps and marking high-crime areas before 2006. According to data from the National Police Agency, the nighttime violent crime rate in the pilot area decreased.

The facility improvement movement reveals the spatial dialectics of body politics. In 2015, the mandatory breastfeeding rooms in Seoul's subway covered most stations, but usage surveys showed that many facilities were occupied by men or converted into storage rooms. In response, the Women's Committee advocated for the design of a gender audit mechanism, requiring new public buildings to pass a women's safety certification. This innovation shifted spatial justice from remedial measures to preventive system design.

==== Women's Hotline ====
The Korea Women's Hotline (KWHL), founded in 1983, has been a pioneering organization in combating gender-based violence and promoting women's rights. Originally established to address domestic violence, KWHL has since expanded its scope to tackle issues such as sexual violence, human trafficking, and workplace harassment. Notably, the organization opened South Korea's first domestic violence shelter in 1987, providing vital resources such as legal aid, counseling, and temporary housing for survivors. The hotline number, 1577-1366, operates as a lifeline for women seeking immediate assistance and support. In addition to direct support, KWHL has consistently advocated for legislative changes to protect victims of abuse and raise awareness through events such as the Film Festival for Women's Rights. Today, the hotline remains a cornerstone of South Korea's movement for gender equality, adapting its programs to address emerging issues like digital sexual violence and exploitation.

The crisis intervention mechanism of the Women's Hotline has promoted the public transformation of emotional labor. According to emotional labor theory, hotline volunteers transform individual trauma into manageable social problems through standardized response strategies. According to a joint report by the South Korean Ministry of Gender Equality and Family and the Korean Women's Human Rights Institute, the 1366 Emergency Counseling Service provided a total of 9,017 telephone consultations. This figure has increased exponentially, reaching 2,710 in 2021, which directly prompted the government to establish a special relief fund.

==== Women's Newspaper ====
Some scholars and citizens of South Korea stated that the shifting of attitudes towards women through other women and men, increased the consciousness of social democracy. Additionally, the Asian Survey conducted by Palley states that "the women in the radical women's organizations believe that women can only achieve their goal of equal status with men if there is a change in the political mechanism."

== Participation effects towards women ==
During the Democratization movement, women kept their roles in their political spaces as mothers and wives. Women's political involvement influenced the end-goal of progressive women's movement groups in the 1980s. With this discourse, scholars mainly focused on class differences rather than Gender Politics and Women's Activism. The reasons for the neglect of these discourses include that as these movements were rising so were "male-dominant labor uprisings in heavy industries," and there was a lack of attention because women struggles were seen as less threatening and less important. Additionally, there was a lack of historical data. This was because of low population in these women's groups and a lack of understanding of the importance of this groups' goals. According to Jeong-Lim Nam, "women's participation in the democratic labor movement in the 1980s has been underrecorded and underdocumented compared to men's participation." On that note, many scholars find it hard to believe that women's activisms helped promote "democratization and political changes in South Korea." The main women's groups were "dominated by highly educated, middle-class women," so these specific women isolated themselves from the working-class population of women. In light of this, middle-class women's group shared different goals. Middle-class women sought for "the elevation of women's rights rather than on the pursuit of political transformation and class-based equality."

=== Obstacles ===
Because there are diverse women's groups that seek to dissolve military rule and ultimately reconstruct a democratic society, there are obstacles that still need to be overcome. Jeong-Lim Nam believes research must be done to see how these groups of women work their way around the democratic system, to see if there is room in these institutions to include women, and whether or not they will be equally accepted into these male dominant spheres. Ultimately, the patriarchal system does not disappear merely because the governance system has transitioned. To start, Lee and Chin state that women's groups were successful because "they chose to work with the new institutions and parties." Therefore, women's participation in politics and social movements is based on how well they adapt to the transition from authoritarian to democratic.
