= Welfare in South Korea =

South Korea's welfare spending has evolved significantly over time. In the past, limited resources and defense spending priorities hindered welfare development. But since the early 2000s there has been a gradual increase in welfare spending. In 2023, the welfare budget amounted to 109 trillion won ($84.4 billion) – one-sixth of the national budget.

The perception of welfare has shifted from negative to positive, with positive reviews for education and health policies. The National Health Insurance system is regarded as one of the best globally, but there are concerns about wasteful resource use. While certain welfare policies have surpluses, others face shortages, such as low allowances for veterans. The national pension system is essential due to aging demographics. Women's welfare has been a significant focus, with efforts to address gender inequality and promote women's rights. Overall South Korea's welfare system has undergone significant transformations and improvements.

== History ==
=== Past and present level ===
The level of welfare in South Korea was significantly low in the past. In the 1940s and 1980s, South Korea had to devote much of its government finances to defense spending to prepare for the threat of North Korea's Invasion. Thus, it could not afford to spend it on welfare.

Since the beginning of the 2000s, Korea's welfare spending has gradually increased. As welfare policies in Europe became known and polarization problems – elderly poverty, poor children, etc. – intensified, political discourse on welfare formed in Korea. Many people insisted on strengthening welfare as the OECD ranking of the welfare budget relative to GDP was lower than that of the United States, a neoliberal country.

Korea, a late welfare state, established the basic framework of the traditional social welfare system in the early 2000s, but the system exposed many issues due to its low level of coverage. New social risks became important due to rapid aging and changes in economic and social structures. As a result, there was a debate over whether to focus on eliminating major issues in the traditional welfare system (mainly cash benefits) or preparing for new social risks such as work-family compatibility and active labor market policies.

In particular, Korea's welfare policy for the disabled is still the lowest among major OECD countries. The South Korean welfare budget became 109 trillion won ($84.4 billion) in 2023, one-sixth of the total national budget for a year.

=== Change in people's perception of welfare ===
==== Negative perception ====
The earlier perception of welfare in Korean society was negative. The perception included mindsets and comments such as: "People who do not work, do not eat"; "The poor are punished because they have been lazy without trying, and there is no need to help such people." The South Korean people in past had a laissez-faire tendency that could only be found in 19th-century England.

==== Positive perception ====
Korea's welfare policy has begun to receive positive reviews. In particular, it has stood out in the fields of education and health.

== Surplus of welfare policy ==
=== National Health Insurance ===
It is one of Korea's social security systems and belongs to public health care. The basis for application is in accordance with the National Health Insurance Act and is operated by the National Health Insurance Corporation and the Health Insurance Review and Assessment Service. Health Insurance Review and Assessment Service under the Ministry of Health and Welfare. The National Health Insurance Corporation is in charge of financial management of health insurance payments and expenditures, and the Health Insurance Review and Assessment Service is in charge of managing medical systems.

Korea's medical insurance is said to be among the best in the world. It is also the fastest insurance system in the world. The insurance system has resulted in the South Korean health indicators to be above the OECD average (average life expectancy, infant mortality rate per 1,000 people, high medical accessibility, high quality of medical care, etc.).

However, the practice-specific fee system adopted by Korea is said to be wasting resources by encouraging excessive medical treatment. According to the statistical yearbook related to health insurance, the current balance of health insurance was 2.7 trillion won to 5.9 trillion won every year from 2013 to 2016, but it began to deteriorate in 2017 and recorded losses of 3.3 trillion won and 2.9 trillion won in 2018 and 2019, respectively.

== Shortage of welfare policy ==
=== Support fund for persons of national merit ===
The monthly allowance for Korean War veterans is 250,000 won, and the monthly allowance for veterans' honor is 200,000 won. In addition, the allowance for widows of war veterans is 50,000 won.

== Typical welfare policy ==
=== The national pension ===
The national pension is the income security system of South Korea paying monthly premiums when you have an income and then being unable to work due to age or being disabled or killed by an unexpected accident or disease. While the average life expectancy is increasing due to the improvement of living standards and the development of medical technology, the birth rate is decreasing and the proportion of the elderly population is rapidly increasing. However, many people cannot afford to prepare for their own retirement. Therefore, this system is implemented to help South Koreans in retirement. The national pension system was started on January 1, 1988, for workplaces with more than 10 workers, and the target group was expanded step by step so that the entire nation could subscribe to the national pension on April 1, 1999. As of the end of January 2022, the number of National Pension recipients exceeded 5.93 million and the number of subscribers was 22.1 million, serving as the country's basic social safety net along with health insurance, employment insurance and industrial accident insurance.

=== Women's welfare policy ===
According to the Korea Women's Development Institute, "women's welfare refers to a state in which women's health, property, and happiness are satisfied by equally guaranteeing human dignity and the right to a human life by the state or society, and at the same time includes all practical efforts to realize women's human life."

There are several policies in South Korea to encourage women's participation in society and enhance women's human rights. It helps women whose careers have been cut off due to pregnancy, childbirth, and childcare, to enter society again. For example, monthly subsidies are provided to multi-child households. To create high-quality women's jobs, there is also a welfare policy that provides free education for women and provides them with jobs.

==== Women's Movement and Women's Welfare in the 1980s ====
The women's movement in the 1980s brought about a major shift in women's welfare. The women's movement in the 1980s is characterized by active women's group activities advocating "feminism," which is distinct from the conservative mainstream women's groups that have been led by the government. In 1983, the Women's Council worked to break down the culture of gender discrimination, highlighting the problems of beaten women and sexual violence as social problems, and presented Korea's first temporary shelter model. In addition, in the 1980s, women's movement organizations such as "Another Culture", "Korean Women's Association", "Christian Women's Association", and "Korean Women's Workers' Association" were created, affecting women's welfare. In addition, the women's movement joined forces to enact the Gender Equality Act and revise the Family Act.

Laws and systems related to women's movement and women's welfare in the 1980s
Women's movement	Government Policy and Women's Welfare (Law, System-oriented)
Support for early retirement litigation and activities to cope with retirement; Opposition to unpaid menstrual leave; Call for the introduction of political and employment quotas; Demand for Expanded Women's Welfare Budget; Sexual torture countermeasures committee activities and human trafficking countermeasures activities; A campaign to revise the Equal Employment Law for Men and Women; A campaign to revise the family law; Daycare legislation	The Constitution's New Regulations on the Rights of Gender equality (1980 and 1897); Comprehensive revision of the Maternal and Child Health Act (1986); Enactment of the Equal employment Act (1987); Amendment to the Equal Employment Act (1989); Enactment of the Mother and Child Welfare Act (1989); Revised appointment of local public officials (abolition of gender-restricted recruitment); Third Amendment to the Family law (1989)

==== Women's Movement and Women's Welfare in the 1990s ====
In the 1990s, the growth of civil society and various social movements were activated in Korean society amid the global wave of openness. Under this environment, the women's movement became more active towards policy-oriented activities. In addition, the social welfare-level tasks encountered in women's daily lives were set as the specific goal of the women's movement, expanding the public base, and diversifying exercise methods and contents. In addition, each women's organization specified the direction of activity and specialized its own characteristics, focusing on interest in a specific field. In this regard, laws and systems related to women's movement and women's welfare were shown in the 1990s. As shown in Table 2 below, the women's movement in the 1990s led the most reformative legislation in the field of social welfare, including the enactment of the Infant Care Act and the revision of the Special Act on Sexual Violence and Domestic Violence.

Laws and systems related to women's movement and women's welfare in the 1990s
Women's movement	Government Policy and Women's Welfare (Law, System-oriented)
Campaign to enact the Infant Care Act; Campaign against the abolition of menstrual leave; Campaign to introduce the quota system for women's employment; Campaign to revise the Equal Employment Law for Men and Women; Japanese Military Sexual Slavery countermeasure activities; Campaign to enact a special law on sexual violence; Campaign to expand women's political participation; Campaign for the Prevention of Family violence Act; Campaign to abolish family headship system	Enactment of the Infant Care Act (1991); Enactment of the Japanese military sexual slavery Support Act (1993); The Punishment of Sexual violence Crimes and the Protection of Victims Act (1994); Enactment of the Framework Act on Women's Development (1995); Amendment of the Act on Prevention of Recreation, etc. (1995); Introduction of the women's recruitment target system under Civil Service Appointment Test Decree (1995); Establishment of the Child Care Leave System and Nursing Leave System under the National Public Officials Act (1995); Revision of the Act on Family Violence (1997); Second and third amendments to the Equal Employment Act (1995, 1999); Act on the Prohibition and Relief of Gender Discrimination (1998); Abolishing Military Additional Points (1999)

==== Women's Movement and Women's Welfare in the 2000s ====
In the 2000s, the Ministry of Gender Equality and Family, which is in charge of women's policy, became more active in public-private and academic cooperation. Through active intervention by the women's movement, the Maternal Protection-related laws, such as the Gender Equality Act, the Labor Standards Act, and the Employment Insurance Act, were revised. Table 3 below shows laws and systems related to women's movement and women's welfare in the 2000s.

Laws and systems related to women's movement and women's welfare in the 2000s
Women's movement	Government Policy and Women's Welfare (Law, System-oriented)
Campaign to abolish family headship system; Women's Solidarity for the Presidential Election; Campaign against prostitution; Campaign to expand women's budgets; Women's Political Power and Political Reform Movement; Campaign to secure the public nature of childcare; Campaign to expand social security system and create jobs to prevent poverty for women	Establishment of the Ministry of Gender Equality in the Government Organization Act (2001); Amendment of the Act on the Prohibition and Relief of Gender Discrimination (2001, 2003); Revision of the Equal Employment Act, the Labor Standards Act, and the Employment Insurance Act (2001); Strengthening the quota system for female nominations under the Political Parties Act (2001); Adolescent Sex Protection Act (2001); Enactment of the Act on the Promotion and Support of Women in Science and Technology; Enactment of the Mother and Father's Welfare Act; Introduction of the target system for training and recruitment in the appointment of public officials; Enactment of the Act on the Punishment and Prevention of Crimes such as Prostitution Mediation (2004); Revision of the Family Law (2005); Revision of the Government Organization Act (Transfer of the Ministry of Gender Equality, 2004); Reorganization of the Ministry of Gender Equality and Family (2005); Abolition of the Act on the Prohibition and Relief of Gender Discrimination(2005); Act on the Promotion of Family-Friendly Social Environment (2007); Enforcement of the Family Relationship Registration Act (2008); Multicultural Family Support Act (2008); Act on the Prevention of Sexual Violence and Protection of Victims (2010)

As such, women's welfare in Korea has led to remarkable growth by the women's movement since the 1980s. In particular, it has been developed by improving numerous women's welfare laws and systems, including the Special Act on Sexual Violence, the Domestic Violence Prevention Act, the Prostitution Prevention Act, and the Family Act. In the process of developing the women's movement, a cooperative relationship with the state was formed, and the state has also developed laws and systems related to women's welfare by institutionalizing the needs and experiences of women activists.

=== Youth welfare policy ===
In 2023, the government began to overhaul the youth support system. There are new systems, and there are cases where the existing system has been reorganized.

==== Youth Leap Account to raise large amounts of money ====
It was scheduled to be released in June 2023 and is a financial product for young people aged 19 to 34 with work and business income. The system involves paying 700,000 won per month, of which the government will pay back 6% of the monthly payment.

The subscription period is from June 2023 to December 31, 2025. It must meet the income standard of less than 60 million won in personal income and less than 180% of the median household income. However, if the mandatory five-year subscription period is not met and the termination is canceled in the middle, the reduced tax amount may be collected.

==== Rising transportation costs ====
The "Youth Public Transportation Expense Support", which was first implemented in 2022, is a support project that had around 1,502,015 people applied in the first year. Through this, 136,028 young people in Seoul saved an average monthly transportation cost of 6,181 won.

The project will continue in 2023. It plans to recruit a "Youth Public Transportation Support Project" in March to secure a budget that can support more than 150,000 people. The "Youth Public Transportation Expense Support Project," which received the second application from July to September, supplemented the support conditions so that more young people can apply. It has signed business agreements with six credit card companies so that they can apply for the business with their existing transportation cards without issuing separate transportation cards. The six credit card companies are BC Card, Samsung Card, Shinhan Card, Woori Card, Hana Card and KB Kookmin Card.

==== Changing the Youth Fill Tomorrow Deduction ====
In the case of the Youth Tomorrow Fill Deduction, a system in which companies and the government support large sums of young people together, some reorganization will begin in 2023.

The Youth Tomorrow Fill Deduction is a financial product that allows young people, companies, and the government to make 12 million won at the expiration of two years after establishing a certain amount. It is for young people aged 15 to 34 working for small and medium-sized companies with a monthly salary of 3 million won or less.

Starting in 2023, the target of companies will be changed starting from 2023. In all existing occupations with more than five employees, it is limited to manufacturing and construction industries with more than five to less than 50 employees. In addition, the number of reserves has changed, increasing the amount that young people and companies have to pay. Previously, young people and companies paid 3 million won and the government paid 6 million won, respectively, but from now on, all young people, companies, and the government will pay 4 million won each. In the case of corporate levies, they were previously paid differently depending on the size of the company, but now they are 100% paid by the company.

==== Youth Job Support System to Expand Opportunities ====
Youth challenge support projects will also be expanded to increase opportunities for young people to work. To promote employment for young people, mid- to long-term programs for more than five months will be introduced from 2023, and short-term programs will be paid up to 500,000 won and mid- to long-term programs will be paid up to 3 million won (2.5 million won in participation allowance and 500,000 won in incentives).

The youth job leap incentive system will also be expanded from 2023 to encourage companies to expand youth employment. The main goal is to provide up to 12 million won for two years through youth job leaping incentives if companies hire young people who are having difficulty finding jobs. In 2023, 600,000 won (a total of 7.2 million won) will be provided per month for the first year, and 4.8 million won will be temporarily provided after two years of service. From 2023, young people who require extended protection, young people who enter and leave youth shelters, and young people who have left North Korea are also included.

=== Welfare policy for the elderly ===
- Basic pension: Approximately 270,000 won per month paid to senior citizens aged 65 or older and with less than 1.19 million won in income
- Comprehensive care services: Support for living education services for senior citizens living alone in need of protection
- Job support: Volunteer and talent sharing for 270,000 won per month

The term "elderly" subject to welfare for the elderly generally refers to a person aged 65 or older. The elderly who can receive long-term care benefits refer to people who are unable to live their daily lives alone due to old age or senile diseases, that is, those aged 65 or older or those under 65 who have senile diseases such as dementia and cerebrovascular disease.

The Basic Direction of Welfare for the Elderly:

1. As a person who has contributed to the upbringing of descendants and the development of the country and society, the elderly are respected, guaranteed a healthy and stable life, and guaranteed the opportunity to engage in appropriate work and participate in social activities according to their abilities.
2. In addition, the Minister of Health and Welfare should conduct a survey on the health and welfare of the elderly every three years and announce the results.
3. To raise social interest and respect for the elderly, October 2nd is every year as Senior Citizens' Day and October is every year as Senior Citizens' Month.
4. Parents' Day is held on May 8 every year to enhance filial piety toward parents.
5. To raise awareness and induce interest in elder abuse nationwide, June 15th should be set as Senior Abuse Prevention Day every year, and the state and local governments should try to hold events and promotions suitable for the purpose of Senior Abuse Prevention Day.
6. The state and local governments divide elderly welfare into areas such as housing, health, income, leisure, safety, and protection of rights and interests, and publish "Guide to Elderly Health Welfare Project" and "Basic Pension Project" every year.

=== Multicultural Family Welfare Policy ===
Seoul Metropolitan Government's Self-Support Project
Business name	Business details
Support for social integration of multicultural families	Operation of employment support and employment education programs for multicultural families; Regional Specialization Project for Multicultural Family Supporting Multicultural Families
Support for multicultural children's learning	Support for visiting children from multicultural families; Career Advancement Project for Children of Multicultural Families; Self-help groups for multicultural families and support programs for mother tongue education
Providing customized care services for multicultural families	Multicultural family care service before and after childbirth; Part-time child care service for multicultural families

== Positive effects ==
Korea provides compulsory education to middle school students. The number of students per teacher is 11.4. It also introduced a free school meal system so that poor students can eat school meals.

== Limitations ==
Korea's public social welfare expenditure is 12.3% of the gross domestic product (GDP), which is 60% of the average of the Organization for Economic Cooperation and Development (OECD).

According to the Ministry of Health and Welfare, the OECD recently released the "OECD Social Expenditure Update 2023" containing these contents.

Korea's public social welfare expenditures in 2018 and 2019 were 206.8 trillion won (10.9% of GDP) and 235.9 trillion won (12.3%), respectively. This is an increase of 11.5% and 14.1% from the previous year, respectively.

The Ministry of Health and Welfare attributed the increase to the expansion of the use of medical and long-term care services, the increase in public pension recipients, the expansion of basic pensions, the introduction and expansion of child allowances, and the expansion of the National Basic Living Security. It increased by about 27% between 2017 and 2019, but compared to other OECD countries, spending relative to GDP is very low.

Korea (12.3%) accounted for the same proportion as Costa Rica, with only Chile (11.7%) and Mexico (7.4%) having a lower proportion than Korea.

The average public social welfare expenditure to GDP in 38 countries where the ratio of public social welfare expenditure to GDP was identified was 20.1%, and Korea spent 61.2% of the OECD average.

One of the main problems of the Korean welfare system are that it does not properly prevent poverty, the most basic function of the welfare system. Cash benefits for the vulnerable are politically less popular than universal social service provision.
