= Chanyang-hoe =

Korean feminist organization

Chanyang-hoe or Chanyanghoe (English: 'Promotion Society' or "Praise and Encouragement Association") was a Korean feminist organization, founded in 1898. It has been referred to as the first women's organization in Korea (though Sunseong-hoe was technically founded in 1896). It aimed to erase the traditional discriminatory Confucian gender segregation by women's education. It has been called the beginning of the women's movement in Korea.

== Background ==
In the 1880s and 1890s, Korea went through a rapid modernization with support of the government, who considered modernization necessary to protect Korea's national independence. Western experts, missionaries, doctors and teachers entered Korea and started schools where girls were accepted, notably the Ewha girls' school, which spread new ideas about women's position in society. Some Korean male intellectuals adapted then prevalent Western ideas that women should be educated in order to raise the next generation, which would benefit the nation. The Western Christian missionary schools were however almost exclusively used by the lower class and orphaned and converted Christian girls, and a need was felt for schools for students from aristocratic Yangban families.

== Foundation and membership ==
The Chanyang-hoe was founded by rich upper class yangban widows in Bukchon in Seoul in 1898, when yangban noblewomen had just recently began to be able to leave traditional seclusion. The goal of the members of the Chanyang-hoe was to free women from the Confucian gender segregation and achieve the same freedom and equality as enjoyed by Western women, and they viewed education as a way to reach that goal. The organization issued the first declaration of women's rights in Korea:

"Why should our women live on what their husbands earn as if fools, confining themselves to their deep chambers all their lives and subjecting themselves to regulations imposed by their husbands? In enlightened countries, both men and women are equal. Women's skills and principles are equal to those possessed by their husbands... We are going to establish a girls' school with the aim of making women equal to men."

The president of the organization was Yangseongdang Yi-ssi, a member of the Korean royal household, and the vice-president and headmaster was the rich yangban benefactor Yanghyeondang Kim-ssi. It had a membership of approximately 400 people, including foreigners, men, and women of the yangban class. They worked with reform Confucians like Namgung Eok, Bak Eun-sik, Jang Ji-yeon, Yi Jong-il, Jang Hyo-geun, Jeong Gyo and Yu Yeong-seok. They were criticised for catering to the elite: "The members of the Chanyanghoe wear silk coats and they favor the rich by giving out membership cards to them" and not granting membership cards "to members who are poor unless they pay the fees beforehand".

== Activity and school ==
They petitioned Emperor Gojong and the establishment for a school for girls. Their "Circular for the Establishment of a Girls' School" has been referred to as the beginning of the Korean women's movement. Emperor Gojong and the Ministry of Education were supportive of opening an official school for girls but the budget did not allow for it in November 1898.

The Ministry of Finance never granted funds for the establishment for a school, but the private Sunseong Girls' School was founded by the society that year. The school was funded by funds from private benefactors such as the noblewoman Yanghyeondang Kim-ssi. The school of the Chanyang-hoe, called Sunseong Girls' School, was referred by the newspaper Dongnip sinmun as "the first time for a women's school to be established in this country" (Dongnipsinmun, September 15, 1898), despite the Western missionary schools for girls that existed at the time.

The society petitioned the government without success, for making their school a state school with state funds. The Jeguk sinmun reported that Yanghyeondang Kim-ssi was teaching needy children at her own expense (Jeguk sinmun February 27, 1900), and the school did not last long after her death in 1903.

== Impact and aftermath ==
After 1906, the struggle for women's education initiated by the Chanyang-hoe finally paid off after the Japan–Korea Treaty of 1905, when need for mobilising of all citizens was felt, and a great number of private Korean girls' schools were founded; as Jinmyeong Girls' School (now Jinmyeong Girls' High School) were founded by Eom Ju-won (1855–1938) on the order of his sister the Royal Concubine Eom (Sunheon Hwangguibi Eom-ssi, 1854–1911), her nephew Eom Ju-ik (1872–1931) opened Myeongsin Girls' School (now Sookmyeong Women's University), former officials and members of the Independence Club founded the Yanggyu School for girls, and former magistrate of Gaeseong, Choe Seok-jo, founded the Hanseong Girls' Academy, followed by the Yangwon Girls' School established by the Women's Educational Society. The first state school for girls, the Hansong Girls' School, was founded by the government in 1908.

The organization was followed by a number of women's organizations the following years, notably the Yo-u-hoe. When Korea was made a Japanese colony in 1910, the Korean women's movement lost pace and many women's associations were banned by the Japanese. Women largely engaged in the underground anti-Japanese resistance instead, such as the Geunwoohoe, the Yosong Aeguk Tongji-hoe (Patriotic Women's Society) and the Taehan Aeguk Buin-hoe (Korean Patriotic Women's Society). After end of the War and the partition of Korea in 1945, the Korean women's movement was split. In North Korea all women's movement was channeled into the Korean Democratic Women's Union; in South Korea, the women's movement where united under the Korean National Council of Women, which in 1973 organized the women's group in the Pan-Women's Society for the Revision of the Family Law to revise the discriminating Family Law of 1957, a cause that remained a main focus for the rest of the 20th century and did not result in any major reform until 1991.
