= Bacchus-F =

South Korean energy drink

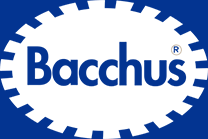
Bacchus logo

Bacchus (Korean: 박카스) is a non-carbonated South Korean energy drink, launched in 1963 and manufactured by Dong-A Pharmaceutical Co., Ltd., part of the Dong-A Socio Group. Its two variants Bacchus-D and Bacchus-F have been popular in South Korea for many years.

In the United States it is distributed by Dong-A America Corporation in a 3.3 oz glass bottle (approximately 1/3 the size of a Red Bull).

== Ingredients ==
Bacchus contains the following ingredients:

- Water
- High fructose corn syrup
- Sugar
- Taurine
- Inositol
- Guarana extract
- Royal jelly
- Nicotinamide
- Pyridoxine HCl
- Riboflavin sodium phosphate
- Thiamine
- Nitrate preserved with sodium benzoate
- Ethanol
- Citric acid anhydrous
- Sorbitol
- Apple juice
- Sodium chloride
- Natural essences (orange pineapple, strawberry)
- Artificial flavor

== History ==
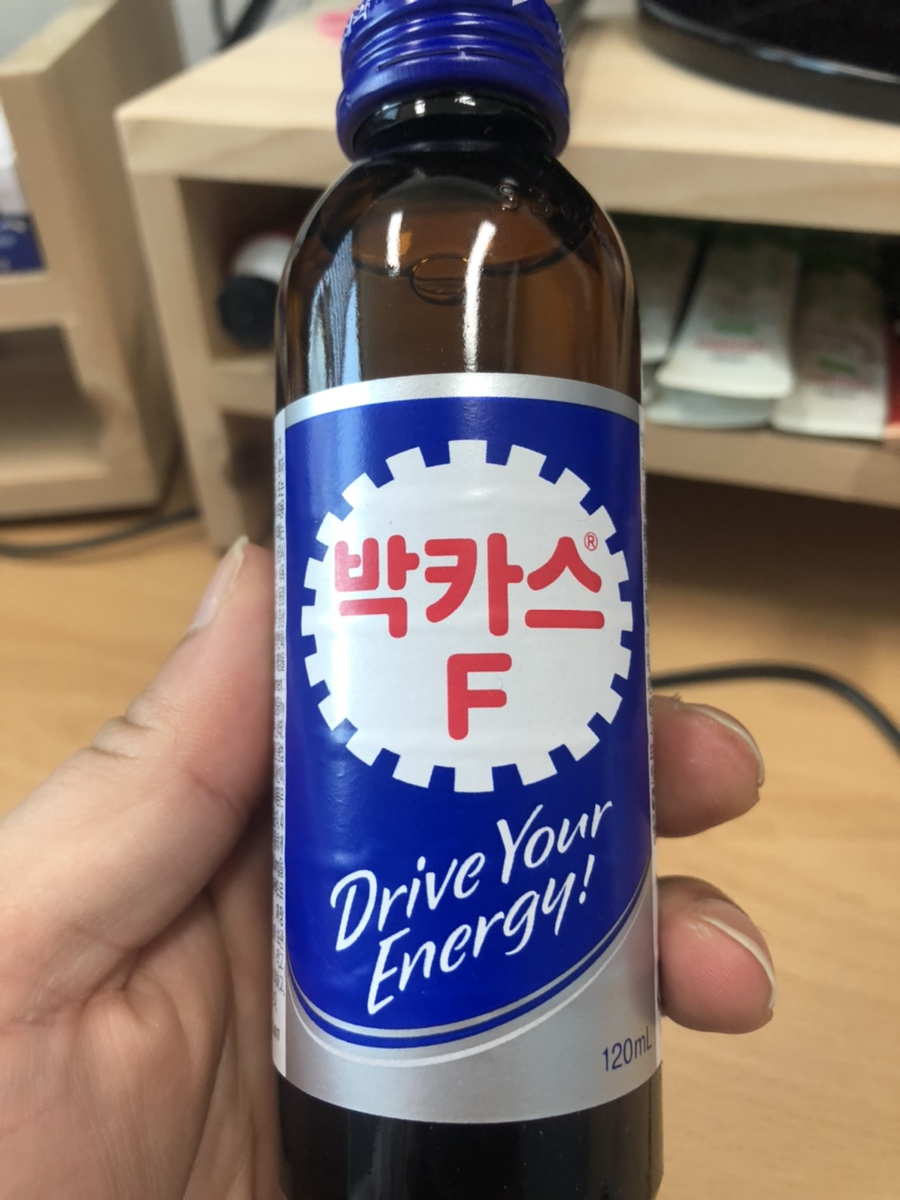
A bottle of Bacchus-F

Bacchus was developed with a strong influence from Lipovitan-D, by Kang Shinho, who had studied medicine in Germany in the 1950s. He named the product Bacchus after the Roman god of wine, of which he had seen a statue inside of the Hamburg City Hall. Bacchus was introduced in 1961 as a tablet (박카스-정), sold in pharmacies as an 'herbal medicine' to prevent colds and cure hangovers.

In 1963 Kang turned it into a drink.

In particular Bacchus-F, with its higher content of 2000 mg of Taurine, has been a favourite of Korean university students.

With the worldwide rise of energy drinks as fashionable mixers in alcoholic drinks like Vodka-Red Bull, Bacchus also has gained a place in American culture. The most common form of consumption is the "Bacchus Bomb", which is produced by pouring a full 3.3 oz bottle of Bacchus into a cup and subsequently dropping a shot glass filled with vodka into the cup, with the resulting mixture being consumed as rapidly as possible.

== In popular culture ==
The Bacchus Lady is a South Korean film that was presented in the Panorama section of the 66th Berlin International Film Festival. The film depicts the life of an elderly Bacchus Lady, which is a Korean prostitute selling the Bacchus energy drink.

In the 2009 Korean film Mother, directed by Bong Joon-ho, the protagonist is given a bottle of insecticide by his mother in a Bacchus bottle as a child.
