= Women in South Korea =

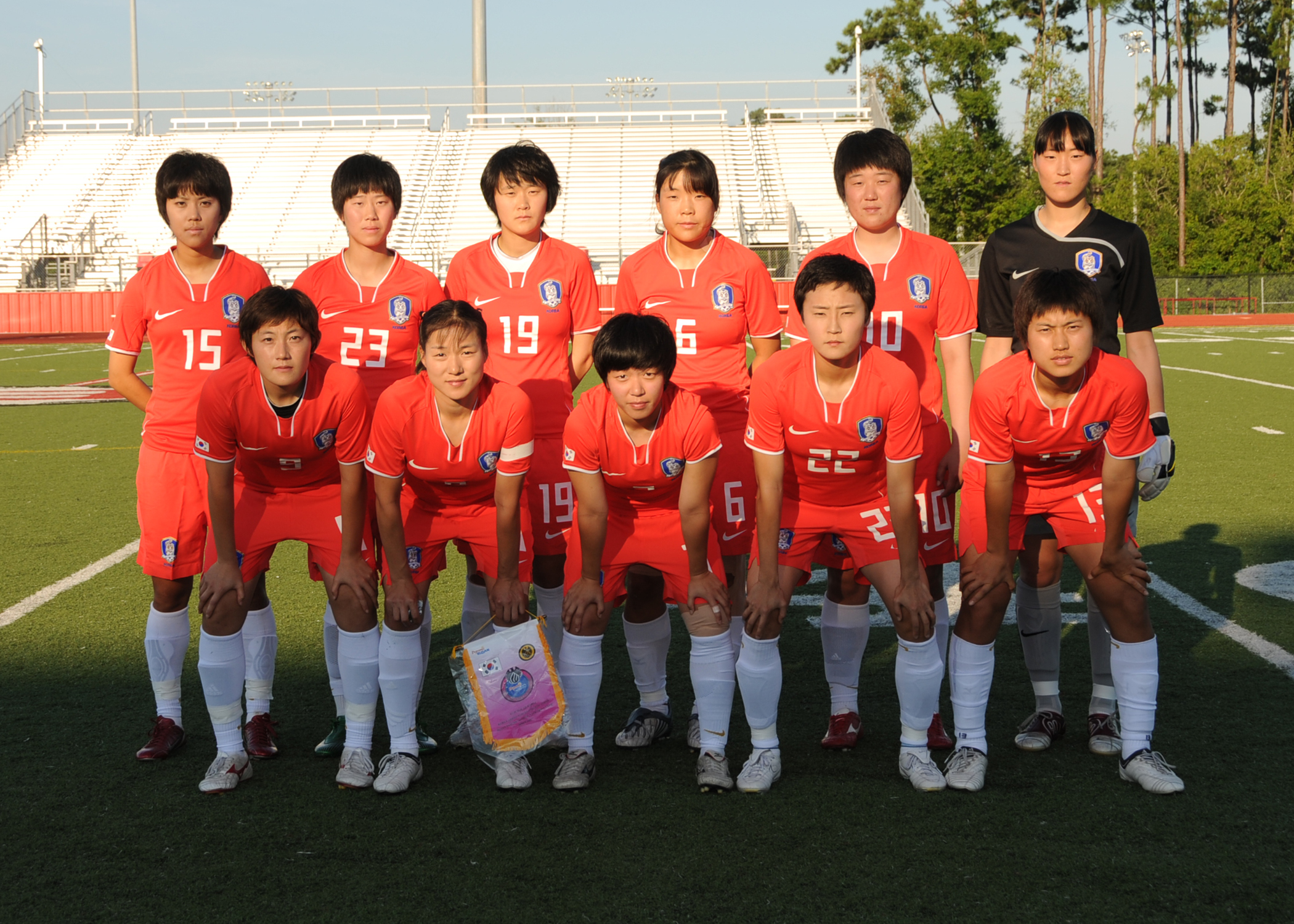
- A South Korean women's football team, 2009

General statistics
- Women in parliament: 20.3% (2024)
- Women over 25 with secondary education: 79.4% (2010)
- Women in labour force: 57.9% employment rate (2015)

Gender Inequality Index
- Value: 0.067 (2021)
- Rank: 15th out of 191

Global Gender Gap Index
- Value: 0.687 (2025)
- Rank: 101st out of 146

Women in South Korea (Korean: 위민 인 사우스 코리아) have experienced significant social changes in recent decades, compared to past eras when Confucianism was deeply imbued in Korean culture. The economy of South Korea has markedly grown due to urbanisation, industrialisation, military authoritarianism, democratic reform, and social liberalisation since the late 1960s. Gender roles and gender identities have been modified in response to modernity. More than half of South Korean women are employed.

In the South Korean political system, although there are not as many female politicians as male politicians, the female politicians have recently begun to participate more actively than in the past. As of 2025, South Korea has 20% of its members in the parliament as women.

In 2023, South Korea ranked 30th out of 177 countries on the Women, Peace and Security Index, which is based on 13 indicators of inclusion, justice, and security. In 2023, South Korea has ranked 20th out of 193 countries on the Human Development Index (HDI). In 2025, it ranked 12th out of 172 countries on Gender Inequality Index (GII), making the country the 2nd least gender unequal state in Asia. On the other hand, South Korea ranked low on Global Gender Gap Report, placing 101st out of 148 in 2025.

In rural areas, most women work in a primary industry such as the agriculture sector. They do not have the variety of educational and employment opportunities. According to a 2019 survey by Ministry of Agriculture, 81% of respondents perceived female farmers to have lower social standing than their male counterparts despite accounting for over 50% of farmers in South Korea.

The status of women has risen to a level where they can be considered socially equal to that of men in terms of education, health, and legal rights. However, there are still substantial political and economical prejudices against women. Korean women still consistently face gender stereotypes regarding rigid gender roles. These stereotypes include women staying at home as housewives, having less power and voice in political and economic participation and movements, and more. South Korean women pay a gender gap; as of 2023, South Korean women earn $22,750 less than men based on 2021 purchasing power parity.

== History ==
In traditional Korean society, women were taught to be subordinated without formal advanced education or some education. Their roles were limited to be confined to the home as housewives and good mothers. Their duties were to maintain harmony in the household by avoiding any unnecessary conflicts. A married woman was to live in her husband's household by taking care of her husband's whole family including parents-in-law. Women were expected to produce sons and they were blamed if their children were girls due to the notion that a son was preferable to a daughter. This idea is called "son preference" (ko: 남아선호사상) and it resulted in sex selection and sex-selective abortion.

The idea of a preference for a boy had a profound impact on family life in Korea's traditional society. Due to the importance of having a son, the status of a woman was greatly affected by her ability to have sons and the number of sons that she had. Failure to give birth to a son caused women to be treated disrespectfully. In addition, the taking of a concubine by a husband was justified when a wife continued to fail to give birth to a son.

Women were expected to take on a passive role in society and support their husbands.

An improvement in the status of women first appeared during the late 19th and early 20th centuries. A large number of Western Christian missionaries came to South Korea in order to set up modern schools. Some of these were established in order to educate women in diverse areas including literature, arts and religion. Prior to this, most Korean women did not have any access to education. As a result of this education, Korean women became able to participate in political movements because those who received education also took part in teaching other women. The Korean women's movement started in the 1890s with the foundation of Chanyang-hoe, followed by a number of other groups, primarily focused on women's education and the abolition of gender segregation and other didscriminatory practices.

When Korea was under the colonial administration of Imperial Japan, many Korean women (numbering up to 200,000) were forced to work as comfort women in Japan's military brothels. Until the end of World War II, Korea was under Japanese occupation. Women participated in the independence movement against Japanese occupation during the 1910-45 period of Japanese colonisation. When Korea became a Japanese colony in 1910 women's associations were banned by the Japanese and many women instead engaged in the underground resistance groups such as the Yosong Aeguk Tongji-hoe (Patriotic Women's Society) and the Taehan Aeguk Buin-hoe (Korean Patriotic Women's Society). As a result, the role of women in society began to change.

After becoming independent from Japan, the Republic of Korea was established as a liberal democracy and women gained constitutional rights. A number of schools were founded for the education of women. Women educated in these schools began to take part in the arts, teaching and other economic activities. They also engaged other women in the discussion of gender equality. The percentage of women in professional fields has steadily increased which has resulted in significant contributions to society, especially in terms of increasing GDP.

As they took a larger role in economic activities, women experienced greater education attainment, providing additional opportunities for professionalization. Today, Korean women receive high levels of education and actively participate many fields and industries. In 1973, the women's groups in South Korea united in the Pan-Women's Society for the Revision of the Family Law to revise the discriminating Family Law of 1957, a cause that remained a main focus for the rest of the 20th century, and finally resulted in a major reform of the Family Law in 1991.

Women's participation in social and economic culture was expected to continue to grow and diversify after the election of South Korea's first female president, Park Geun-Hye in 2013. This was partially due to Park Geun-Hye's promise to promote a "women's revolution" and provide support for childcare, increased opportunities for promotion, and salary equality. Park Geun-Hye also promised to make other advances for women, but not all of these policies were realised.

Following a long global fight against the so-called "tampon tax" or "period poverty", South Korea's Ministry of Gender Equality and Family will launch a pilot program to provide free menstrual pads in public facilities with a 3-billion won funding, marking the country's first government-led effort to ensure universal access to menstrual products. The pilot program will cover 10 regions selected based on population and existing programs, with pads placed in public facilities to ensure accessibility. Earlier, President Lee Jae Myung criticized the relatively high cost of sanitary pads in South Korea compared to overseas markets, a move that pushed manufacturers to reduce prices and introduce ultra-low-cost options such as "100-won sanitary pads."

== Legal rights ==
The Convention on the Elimination of Discrimination against Women (CEDAW) states that discrimination against women is about equality of rights and human dignity. The political and social principles of the state violate the principle of respect for sex and are equal to that of men. Pointing out that it is an obstacle to participation in the economic, cultural life of the country. For the sake of development and human welfare and peace, women are equal to men in all areas. It is necessary to participate as much as possible and achieve full equality between men and women. The traditional role of men as well as the role of women in society and home to be successful. Also, the issue of discrimination against women in society as a whole. In all fields, such as politics, economy, society, culture, etc., under the basic recognition that it is necessary to take responsibility for it. To ensure that all appropriate measures are taken by the Parties to eliminate discrimination against women.

Women in South Korea are guaranteed all the legal rights that men have, except for complete control over their sexual and reproductive health. In 1948, women gained their legal rights to vote, drive, and own and inherit properties and assets. All Korean citizens are guaranteed for national health insurance under the National Health Insurance Act. South Korea has worked on its way to implement gender equality by revising and changing any discriminative contents in its existing legislative laws since the 1980s.

Implementation of laws to prohibit gender inequalities and prejudice have increased the number of women in the workforce. Women's status in South Korea illustrates the fact that Korea still has a lot of room to be improved for gender equality. Therefore, the legislation and public rules have critical and significant roles to influence Korean cities to elevate the social structure substantially.

South Korea outlawed marital rape in 2013.

"The Framework Act on Women's Development," which was enacted in 1995 and has been used as a legal basis for Korean women's policy, was renamed "The Framework Act on Gender Equality." From the birth of the Framework Act on Gender Equality in May 2014 to the enforcement on July 1, 2015, the various discourse was produced to view the revision as a paradigm shift in Korean women's policy. However, the revision has shaken the understanding of terms such as "gender" and "women," "gender equality" or "gender-sensitive perspectives," and caused a gap between political and academic over terminology. In this situation, we must consider how Korean women's policies have so far understood gender and how policies have changed. In addition, research has been conducted to explore ways in which "The Framework Act on Gender Equality" can be changed for the better through the concept of intersectionality.

By conducting surveys and in-depth interviews with Korean female welfare workers, investigators focused on examining gender awareness through various questions about gender perspectives and analyzing women's gender roles and gender identities in their families. According to the analysis, gender awareness was very weak in Korean women's welfare policy, but awareness of its importance and necessity was high. Women's welfare officials are often aware of women's gender roles as "dependents" and "caregivers," which results in a reflection in the policy's implementation process.

== Reproductive rights ==
As this commentary examines a number of pronatalist policies implemented in South Korea within the last decade, the aim of the commentary is to assess how such policies could harm women's reproductive health if they are implemented only with the intention of controlling population growth. Since 2005, South Korea has heavily regulated and promoted the use of reproductive technologies, including abortion technologies and assisted reproductive technologies (ARTs), to increase population growth. South Korea has one of the lowest fertility rates in the world.

Between 1990–1994 to 2015–2019, the number of unintended pregnancies in South Korea decreased by 49%. Abortion rates declined by 46% during the same period. During 2005–2009, the share of unintended pregnancies that ended in abortion reached 67%, then decreased to 62%.

South Korea's criminal code has been amended to remove abortion care from its provisions effective January 1, 2021. This will eliminate legal barriers to accessing the required abortion care. Abortion had been illegal from 1953 to 2020. A pregnant woman who undergoes an abortion can be sentenced for a year in prison or fined as much as 2 million won. Two years of prison could be handed down to healthcare workers who perform abortions. Abortions are often performed despite this, and the law is rarely enforced.

As a result, patients and healthcare providers were prevented from discussing their experiences, sharing information, and getting support from each other. It was ruled unconstitutional by the Constitutional court on April 11, 2019, and a law revision must be carried out by the end of 2020. After being proposed for revision in October 2020, the law was not voted upon by the deadline of December 31, 2020.

== Education ==
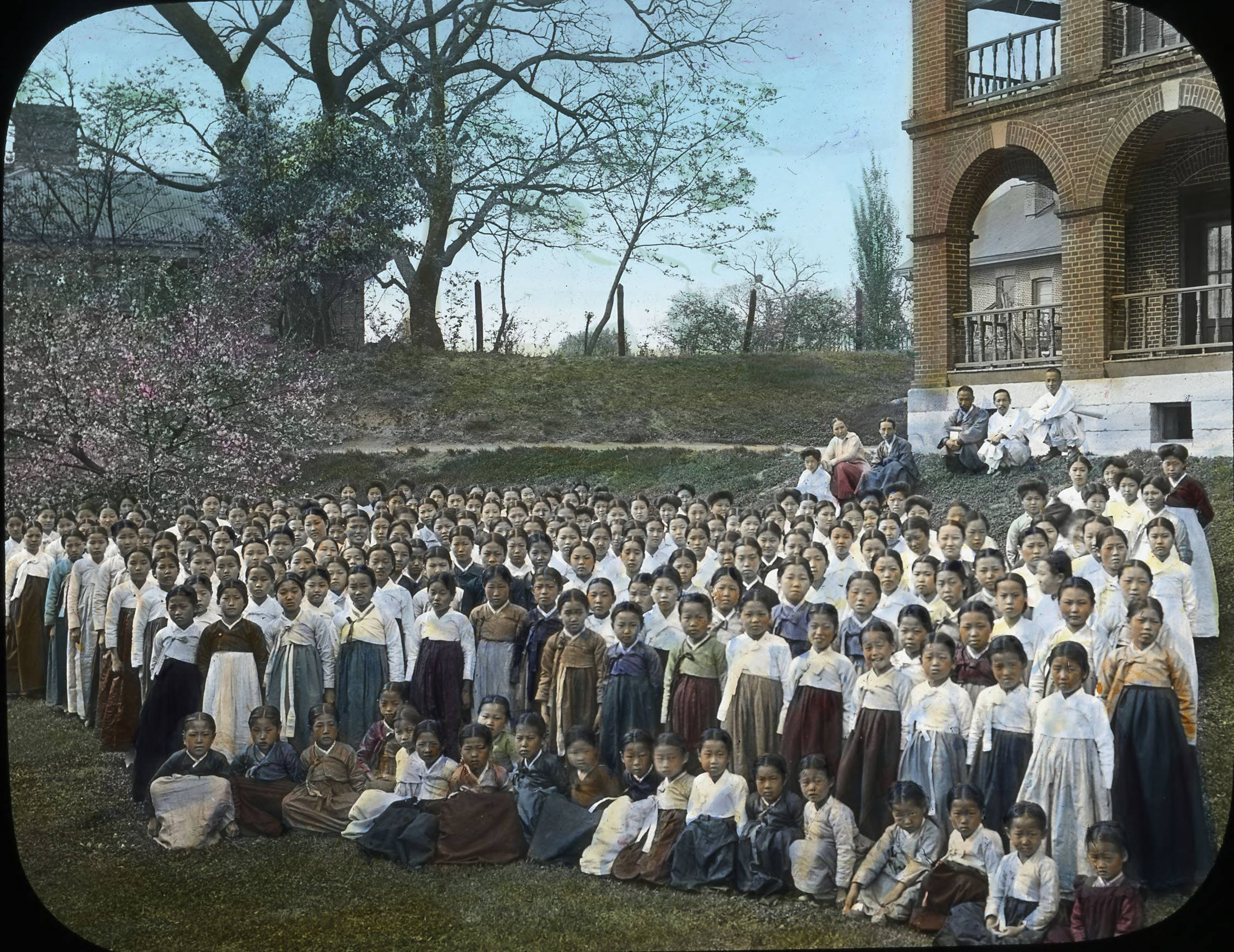
Girls in the lower grade at Ewa Haktang, before 1922

In traditional Korean society, women and girls were not given access to formal education and the literacy rate was low. The transition came in the late 19th century to the early 20th century when the Western Christian missionaries came to South Korea by establishing modern schools for girls. In 1886, Methodist missionaries found a primary school. In 1945, this primary school gained its status as a university, which is now called Ewha Womans University. Ewha Womans University is still known as the most prestigious women's university in South Korea.

There were numerous women's schools established respectively. In the 1890s, Chongsin Girls' School and Paehwa Girls' School were established in Seoul, which is the capital city of Korea. There were about ten women institutions of higher education such as junior colleges, colleges, and university by 1987 in South Korea. In fact, the women enrolment for higher education was at 28%. In 1987, there were about 262,500 female students in higher education. Although more women had access to higher education compared to the past, only 16% of university and college educators were women in 1987.

In today's South Korean society, the Constitution ensures equal access to education for women and also eliminates any discrimination regarding receiving education based on gender. In 1970, the literacy rate was 87.6%. In addition, according to 2002 estimates, the literacy rate increased to 97.9%; 96.6% of women and 99.2% of men are literate. According to 2008 estimates, there is approximately a 99% enrolment rate for both elementary school and middle school. The enrolment rate for high school is at approximately 96.6%.

== Family life ==
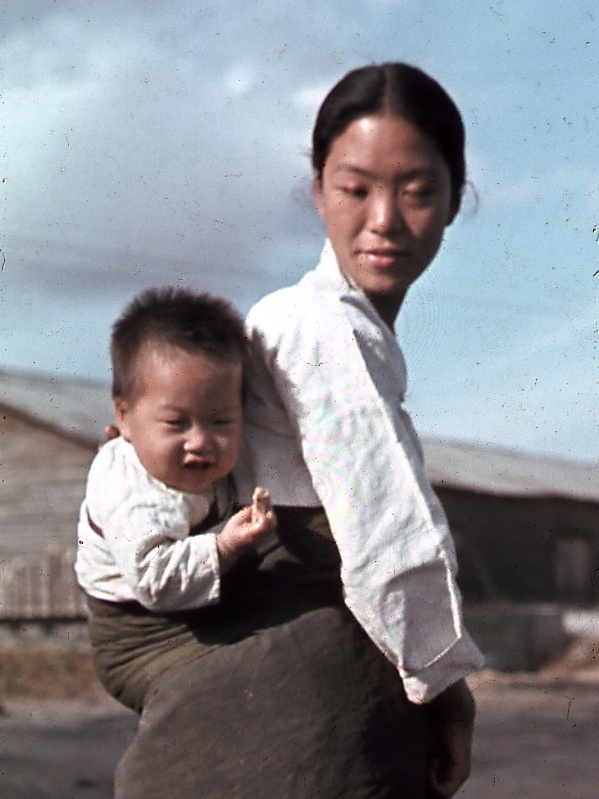
A mother and her child in the countryside near Seoul, 1945

Despite the rapid changes in society due to industrialization, a gender-equal family culture has not emerged due to the long-standing influence of the patriarchal family norms. In particular, familism, which has been emphasized through the industrialization process, has continued to be family-centered and patriarchal, emphasizing the safety of the entire family rather than the individual. Familism consequently infringes on women's unique rights by defining women as secondary to their family composition. In South Korea's history, which has disparaged women's rights, gender inequality has been strengthened, reproduced through the family's life culture. For example, the traditional marriage and kinship system, which used women as objects of paternalism, has excluded women from ancestor worship, inheritance, and possession. However, the recent debate over the abolition of the family headship system in South Korea has emerged as an important social issue.

As of February 2015, adultery is no longer illegal in South Korea.

=== New family structures ===
After becoming independent from Japan, the Republic of Korea was established as a liberal democracy. Women were granted the constitutional right to equal opportunities and could pursue education, work, and public life. A number of schools were founded for the education of women. Women educated in these schools began to take part in the arts, teaching and other economic activities. They also engaged other women in the discussion of gender equality. The percentage of women in professional fields has steadily increased which has resulted in significant contributions to society, especially in terms of increasing GDP.

As they took a larger role in economic activities, the educational level of women also increased, providing additional opportunities for professionalization. In 1973, the women's groups in South Korea united in the Pan-Women's Society for the Revision of the Family Law to revise the discriminating Family Law of 1957, a cause that remained a main focus for the rest of the 20th century, and resulted in a major reform of the Family Law in 1991.

The problematic inherent in family structure, in particular in South Korea's heterosexually marriage-centered housing and loan-lending structure reveals the struggles of Korean women to achieve personal privacy. as Jesook Song points out and as it is the consequence of the process of their spatial independence, to break away from traditional family patterns.

According to the Population and Housing Census 2019, published by KOSTAT (Statistics Korea), the number of single households reaches 30.2% of all households in Korea, and 1-person and 2-person households occupied 58.1% of the total households, up 1.5% from 56.5% in 2018. In addition, there is a tendency for young South Koreans to not want to start a family in the age group of 20, on the contrary, many seek to focus on their academic and working life. Unlike the past, being single is becoming less of a stigma. Despite the trend is relatively still new, being single in Korea is rather celebrated as being independent and self-appreciating.

=== Role of women in the family ===
The benefits of these social reproductions were enjoyed at the expense of women's power in societies. However, Korean women's role as mothers should not be understood with such easiness. Korean women consider themselves to be moderately important, and it is often their role as mothers that strengthens their position in society, which mobilizes their resources and positions.

=== Manager mothers ===
The figure of the manager mother is an emerging image in the educational context of South Korea. Specifically, neoliberal transformations have promoted the evolution of the maternal figure within the family, strengthening and evolving its role as educational support.

Mothers have different nicknames in the Korean society. One of the most popular of these names, is 'manager moms'.

These mothers manage school work, GPAs and their children's strategies to enter prestigious universities. Their abilities are determined by how much information they have access to and their usefulness in order to finally get their children into a prestigious university.

This process starts as early as children's day care years. Once students enter and graduate from elite universities, their chances of reaching a white-collar job increase. Manager mothers' parenting is oriented around the future success of their children. This becomes an opportunity for the whole family to remain in or join the middle and upper classes. In turn, the family's upward mobility is perceived to be in the hands of these mothers.

This maternal subjectivity is very outraged and pitied. Some see these mothers as people who are obsessed and who go beyond social limits to make their children succeed. Others regret that these women are in fact preys of the rigid competitive Korean education system. The expected ability of mothers managers often promises their full-time status as middle-class housewives with sufficient economic, cultural and social resources. This makes working mothers or working-class mothers feel relatively deprived and irresponsible for their children. The advent of managing mothers can be defined as creating the modern Korean family.

== Professional life ==
According to The Economist's 2013 Glass Ceiling Index of five indicators of friendliness towards working women, South Korea ranked low among the OECD countries because of its lack of women in senior jobs in 2025.

There has been a tangible increase in the number of women joining the workforce. In 2014, the number of Korean women in the workforce was estimated to be 57%, whereas in 1995 the number 47.6%. The statistical increase in the number of employed women has not correlated with the equality of wage, as the gender wage gap reported in 2013 was 36.3%, the worst of all OECD nations present in the data.

A study was conducted to justify the Work-Family Conflict scale (WFC) revised and developed by Ginamon and Rich for married working women in Korea. The work-family conflict measure considered both directions, "work to a family," and "family to a work," to better understand the various roles of women in the work-family domain. Through this test, a discriminatory feasibility test between work-family conflict and work-family fostering revealed a significant negative correlation. This result supported the validity of the WFC. Simultaneous inspection of WFC and workplace satisfaction confirmed validity, and as the work-family conflict grows, women's work satisfaction decreases. And it has created the prejudice that the workplace of female workers is where they stay "temporarily."

While it is viewed as a societal norm that women be able to contribute to the finance of the household, the majority of the onus is placed upon men. Women also claim much of the responsibilities of being a caretaker, as half of the women that voluntarily leave their mid-career or senior-level jobs do so due to family commitments College-educated women in Korea tend to invest more time and capital to raising their children than individuals without a degree. However, due to the declining population in Korea, there has been a conscious effort to address these issues by the South Korean government, as "the government gives loans or subsidies to businesses to build childcare facilities, and more than half of all businesses now provide these. It also pays subsidies to businesses that offer more than 30 days of childcare leave a year, allow women to work less than full time, and re-employ women returning from maternity leave."

Despite these efforts, the number of women who regularly use these support systems composes a minority of the women who find themselves in this position. A major factor that influences these decisions is the declining birth rate in Korea, as Korea's birthrate of 1.19 per family put a greater emphasis upon the quality of education and care upon the one, or two children that the family will take care of.

According to a comprehensive analysis of factors that can affect female workers' gender discrimination by dividing them into personal, family, relational, and environmental characteristics, "the perception of bosses and leaders" and "relationship with them" were important factors that determine women's perception of gender discrimination at work.

Korea's gender system serves as the basis for the social rights of non-regular female workers in structural relationships with the labor market and welfare state. Women's irregular labor in Korea is the main form of "temporary" employment and is characterized by job insecurity, low wages, long-term labor, and exclusion from national welfare and corporate welfare. From a social perspective, all types of rights based on their status as workers, parents, spouses, and citizens are vulnerable: paid labor, unpaid labor, and care rights. Until now, it has been interpreted that female non-regular workers are treated worse than male non-regular workers due to the influence of the gender system, which defines women as care-giver and secondary workers. However, the "male livelihood support" function, which provides married women with the opposite of unpaid labor, only works for middle-class married women in Korea, and in this sense, Korea's gender system is more of a "layered" male livelihood support rather than a "typical" male livelihood support. And the poor social rights of female irregular workers are responsible for all three closely linked structures: a social insurance-driven welfare state, a dual labour market system, and a gender system in the male-dependent model. But the most important of these is the "dual labour market system." Without solving the problem of the dual labour market system, it is unlikely that the social rights of non-regular female workers will be improved.

The glass ceiling for women has been tested in contemporary times. In 2012, Samsung promoted three women into executive roles, which was unusual for a company of its size. Samsung has also stated that it aims to have at least 10% of its executive positions to be held by women.

In 2013 Kwon Seon-joo became South Korea's first female bank CEO, as the CEO of state-owned Industrial Bank of Korea.

In 2021, South Korea's actress Youn Yuh-Jung became the first Korean actress to be nominated for an Academy Award. The nominated movie Minari is about the settlement of Korean families who immigrated to the United States. In this movie, she played the role of Monica's grandmother, Soon-Ja. She won the Academy Award for Best Supporting Actress for this role.

== Women's movement ==
The Korean women's movement started in the 1890s with the foundation of Chanyang-hoe, followed by a number of other groups, primarily focused on women's education and the abolition of gender segregation and other discriminatory practices.

When Korea became a Japanese colony in 1910, women's associations were banned by the Japanese government and many women instead engaged in the underground resistance groups such as the Yosong Aeguk Tongji-hoe (Patriotic Women's Society) and the Taehan Aeguk Buin-hoe (Korean Patriotic Women's Society). As a result, the role of women in society began to change.

After end of the War and the partition of Korea in 1945, the Korean women's movement was split. In North Korea, all women's movement was channelled in to the Korean Democratic Women's Union; in South Korea, the women's movement was united under the Korean National Council of Women in 1959, which in 1973 organized the women's group in the Pan-Women's Society for the Revision of the Family Law to revise the discriminating Family Law of 1957, a cause that remained a main focus for the rest of the 20th century and did not result in any major reform until 1991.

== Women in the military ==
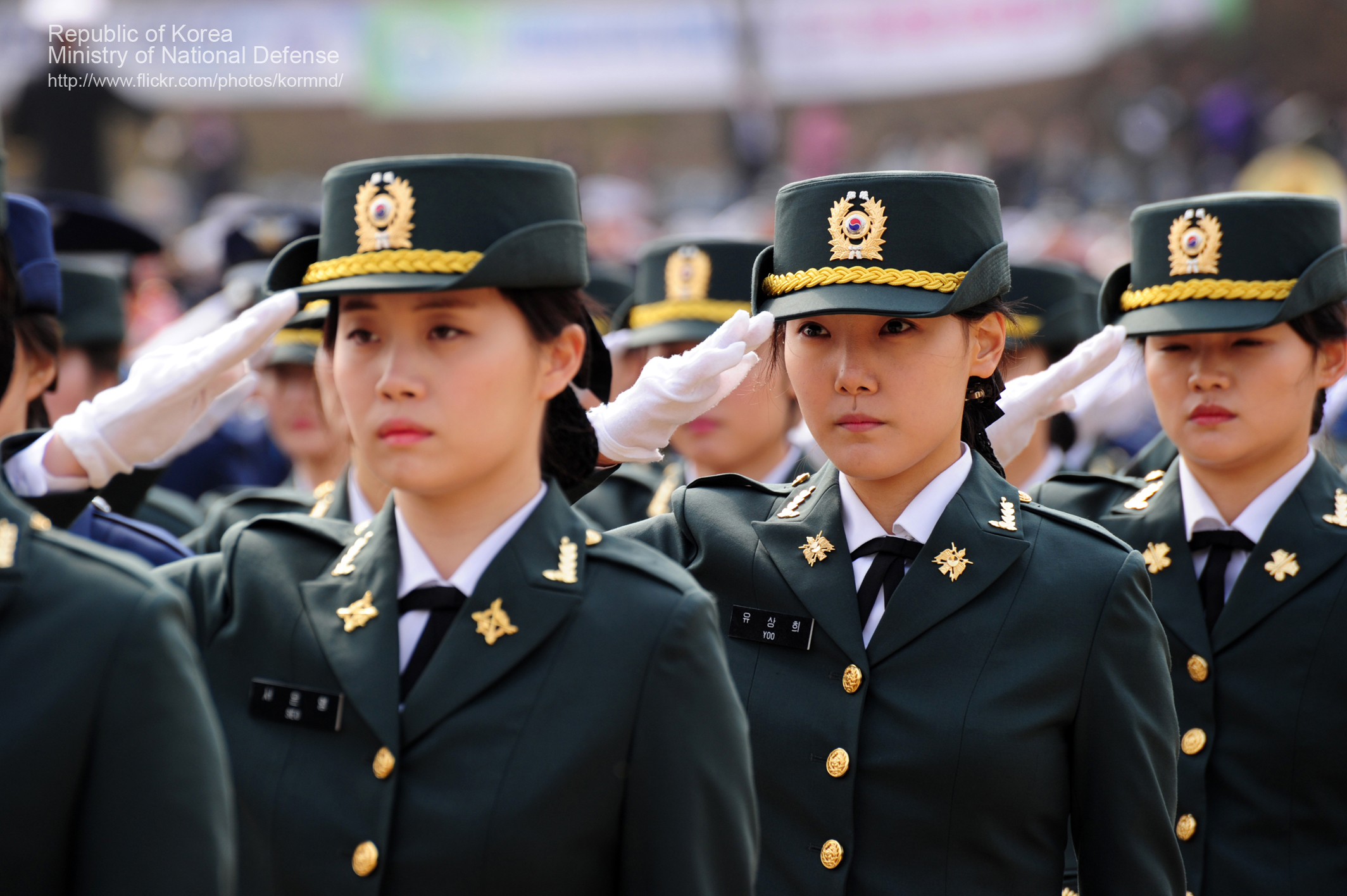
Female soldiers of the South Korean military during the 2013 Joint Commission Ceremony of Officer

Conscription in South Korea has existed since 1957. Male citizens between the ages of 18 and 28 are currently required to perform compulsory military service. Women became a part of the South Korean military in 1950. Women are not currently required to perform military service, but they are allowed to join the military voluntarily. As of 2002, about 2,100 female soldiers were enlisted in the South Korean army. This represented less than 1% of the entire body of soldiers. As of 2010, about 3.5% of South Korean soldiers were female. In 2020, there were approximately 7,550 women enlisted in the military, making up about 8.8% of South Korean soldiers.

The first group of women to serve in the South Korean army enlisted in 1950 in response to the outbreak of the Korean War. A volunteer army of about 500 women was formed to assist the all male combat units. The women received basic military training, but were only given tasks related to propaganda and communications. The volunteer army was disbanded in 1951, and the women were discharged. In 1955 the Women's Military Training Center was created with the sole purpose of training female soldiers. Women were recruited to perform work in telecommunications, stenography and typing. The number of women in the South Korean military was limited at this time, and women that enlisted were not given the same responsibilities as men. It was a common belief that female soldiers could not perform as well as their male counterparts in combat, and many female officers have struggled with the physical intensity of basic training.

In the 1980s, gender issues became a part of state's policy because of the transition of power from military rule to civilian rule. At this time, women's organizations began to seek equality by demanding more representation in South Korea's public employment and military. While representation increased in response, equality was not immediately achieved. Before 1988, female soldiers had to resign if they became pregnant, as pregnant women were considered unfit for duty. Because of the Equal Employment Law of 1988, pregnancy is now permitted for all commissioned officers, and non-commissioned officers with a rank of sergeant first class or higher. Since 1990, the responsibilities of female soldiers have changed, as the range of tasks given to women in the South Korean military have been expanded. Female military recruits now receive the same basic training as the male recruits, although physical fitness test chart for male and female soldiers may differ.

== Prostitution ==
Prostitution in South Korea is illegal. South Korean women and girls have been victims of sex trafficking in South Korea. They are raped and physically and psychologically harmed in brothels, businesses, homes, hotels, and other locations throughout the country.

In 2003, after recovering from a financial meltdown, the unemployment rate for women was 12% in the 15-29 age group. In 2006, women in the age group of 20-29 constituted 40% of the total unemployed population, the figure being roughly around 340,000. The high levels of unemployment for women has contributed to the growth of the Korean sex trade. There are an estimated 500,000-1,000,000 women who partake in the sex trade, that being approximately one in every twenty-five women. The prominence of the sex trade has given birth to the "Bacchus Ladies", grandmothers who trade sex and other favours on top of the energy drink Bacchus they sell, of which their name was coined after.

South Korean law first acknowledged women as rapists in June 2013; in 2015, the first woman was charged with rape in South Korea. The woman, only identified with her surname Jeon, was also the first woman to be arrested for sexually abusing a man.

== Crimes against women ==
=== Spy cameras ===
Spy cameras, known as molka (몰카) in South Korea, are an ongoing issue, in particular their use in illicitly recording women and girls. As technology has progressed, cameras have become smaller and some have been made to resemble everyday objects (for example: ballpoint pens, key rings, USB sticks). These small "spy cams" have been placed in public restrooms, motels, hairdryers and TVs. More than 6,000 spy camera cases were reported to the police every year between 2013 and 2017.

Criminals often use these videos or pictures, publishing them online for money. In some cases they have been published to online live streams. While many of those who make the recordings are indiscriminate with regard to their victims, some specifically target those with fame or wealth such as K-pop stars, actors, government officials, or popular social media figures.

Spycam recording is an invasion of privacy involving a disregard for human rights, and it can have a significant impact on its victims. Some people are frightened by the thought that someone could always be watching them. Other reactions include stress, drinking, and in some cases the victims have committed suicide. Before the National Assembly extended the law on this, offenders would serve up to 18 months for the crime. The maximum sentence has been extended to 3 years, and this includes anyone who has the footage in their possession rather than just the person who made the recording.

In June 2018, President Moon Jae-In further extended the penalty to 10 million won (U.S. $9,000) or five years in prison. Over 6,400 cases of illegal filming were reported in 2017, while in 2012 the number was 2,400. There were over 26,000 reported cases from 2012 to 2016. With few government staff available to inspect public restrooms and items, it has been difficult for government agencies to find hidden cameras since they are usually only placed in a location for a short time.

=== Online harassment ===
In 2021, a digital sex crime called the Nth room case occurred in South Korea. The suspects used messenger apps such as Telegram to lure and threaten victims, filming and distributing the resultant sexual exploitation. Research has been actively pursued in South Korea into ways to respond to digital sex crimes such as the Nth room case. The research has identified a lack of punishment for many digital sex crimes, emphasizing that digital sex crime should be regarded as a form of violence and a crime against women. Increasing the punishment for making illegal recordings and actively investigating reports have been suggested. In addition, technology could be used to block the publication of illegal recordings. There is also an opinion that watching illegal recordings could be punished.

On June 16, 2021, Human Rights Watch, an international NGO, released a report detailing digital sex crime in South Korea. The report claims that digital sex crimes in South Korea are pervasive and often dismissed by police and lawmakers because the crimes don't take place physically. Prosecution of digital sexual crime cases decreased by over 43 percent in 2019, and 79 percent of those convicted in 2020 received only a suspended sentence and/or a fine.

== See also ==
- The National Women's History Exhibition Hall – Women's history museum in Goyang, South Korea
- Gender inequality in South Korea
- Korean beauty standards
- Domestic violence in South Korea
- Women in unions in South Korea
- Women's Party (South Korea)
- Women in Asia
