= Yo-u-hoe =

Women's organization in Korea

Yo-u-hoe (Association of Women Friends) was a Korean women's organization, founded in 1899.

The purpose was to fight discriminating Confucian practices such as gender segregation and concubines. It hosted a famous sit-in demonstration at the Toksu Palace in protest against the traditional male privilege custom of concubinage.

== See also ==
- Sunseong-hoe
- Chanyang-hoe
