= Kwon In-sook =

South Korean activist (born 1964)

- 권인숙

Member of the National Assembly
- Incumbent
- Assumed office 30 May 2020
- Constituency: Proportional representation

Personal details
- Born: 28 August 1964 (age 62) Wonju, Gangneung, South Korea
- Party: Democratic
- Education: Seoul National University; Rutgers University; Clark University

Korean name
- Hangul: 권인숙
- RR: Gwon Insuk
- MR: Kwŏn Insuk

Kwon In-sook (Korean: 권인숙; born 1964) is a former South Korean labor organizer who inspired women in South Korea to form the Korean Women's Associations United (KWAU). Kwon is the first woman to bring charges of sexual assault against the South Korean government. She was also considered by historian Namhee Lee to be "an emblematic figure of South Korea in the 1980s; she embodied the passion, the ideals, and the conflicting aspirations of the 1980s democratization movement." Kwon later became a feminist scholar in South Korea.

== Biography ==
As a middle school student, Kwon recalls feeling "duped" by the Korean government in power. She had been involved with student movements at the time, and said that "It was hard to swallow the betrayal and anger against adults to had fed lies to the young." Kwon went on to become a student activist in the democratic movement while in college.

Later, as a Seoul National University student, she obtained a blue-collar job by not reporting her university credentials. She lied about her education in order to "organize factory workers into a trade union." In June 1986, she went to the police station in Puch'ŏn in order to address charges that she had falsified documents. She had also been charged for taking part in a "violent demonstration." Kwon was sexually abused at the police station by an officer, Mun Kwi-dong. Kwon went on to file sexual abuse charges against the government, which were initially considered "exaggerated" by authorities, even though the government had already admitted that she was "forced to remove her jacket and T-shirt and was beaten 'in the breasts three or four times' on two occasions during the questioning." In July 1986, a rally in protest of her treatment was sponsored by Kim Yong-sam and the New Korea and Democratic Party (NKDP), but was stopped by police with tear gas.

During press coverage of the case, the South Korean government micromanaged how the press would report what happened to Kwon, including guidelines that changed the tone of the case and which also cast Kwon as a liar and possibly a communist. The initial reporting of the story was a single line at the bottom of the social page in Korea Daily. A spokesman for the government called her allegations of sexual assault a "routine tactic used by student radicals." Eventually the police did admit that "she had been sexually molested during interrogation."

Kwon was eventually imprisoned for eighteen months for falsifying identification documents. Criminal charges against Mun were dropped because while "the prosecution office said its investigation into Kwon's complaint found some truth" there was still not enough evidence for them to proceed with the trial. In addition, the prosecution claimed that while she had been beaten on the breasts while nude, the government did not "consider these acts sexual abuse." Kwon was released from prison in 1987, along with hundreds of other political prisoners in Korea. Mun was eventually assessed $45,000 in civil penalties after "extensive legal maneuvering." Kwon's case is considered an illustration of cover-ups regarding political neutrality of the South Korean judicial system in the mid-1980s.

Kwon has gone on to become a feminist scholar whose work analyzes patriarchal constructs of masculinity in militarized areas and how these concepts affect women, children and civilians.

== Legacy ==
The news that Kwon had sued regarding her sexual abuse would "rock Korean society for months. It was shocking that a young woman would go public with an accusation that was more likely to damage her own reputation than that of the accused." Traditionally, sexual and physical abuse was considered an "unspeakable experience," but Kwon's public testimony helped reframe the issue of sexual abuse in South Korea by "recasting her experience from the 'shame of the victim' to the 'crime of the perpetrator." The acts of sexual abuse as described by Kwon led to the creation of the KWAU which would influence Korean politics in the 1990s.
