= Korean Women's Associations United =

South Korean women's organization

Korea Women's Associations United
- 한국여성단체연합
- Formation: 1987
- Type: Non-governmental organization
- Location: Seoul, South Korea

Korean Women's Associations United (KWAU or Korean: 한국여성단체연합) is an umbrella organization made up of 33 other associations in order to focus on women's issues in South Korea. Along with the Korean National Council of Women (KNCW), KWAU helps coordinate non-governmental organization activities dealing with women's issues and feminism throughout Korea and had a prominent effect on the democratisation of Korea.

== History ==
The KWAU was founded in February 1987. It was made up of left-wing, pro-labor feminists in the wake of the sexual assault charges brought by Kwon In Suk against the Korean government. The women involved were a diverse group of blue-collar workers, clerical workers, professionals, housewives, college students, rural women and poor women living in cities. KWAU was also connected to the minjung movement and the national democratic movement.

This period involved a focus on women's rights. This focus included an emphasis on a few areas in the fight against inequality including lifelong equal work, the protection of maternity, sexual violence as the violation of human rights, and the pacifism of women. Initially, there were 21 organizations who came together to create KWAU. Some of the original organizations of KWAU included the Women's Society for Democracy, the Korea Women's Hot Line, the Women's Newspaper (now the Women's News), Korean Women Workers Association, Korean Catholic Farmers, Women's Committee and others.

KWAU directly opposed the military Jun government and participated in the struggle against these forces which it saw as leading the country in a wrongful manner. KWAU was significant in that it, unlike other women's groups in Korea at the time, took an "oppositional stance toward the repressive state" run by Chun Doo-hwan. The minjung social movement ultimately led to direct elections and the resignation of President Chun Doo-hwan of which KWAU is largely credited for its role and participation in this movement allowing for success. KWAU helped the individual organizations under its umbrella to obtain financial support, conducted meetings on behalf of the groups and organized leadership training.

KWAU worked to not only bring women on an equal footing with men, but also worked to transform the social structures which were oppressive to women. KWAU helped promote maternity leave, childcare issues and equal pay for equal work. This was done in various ways some of which included demanding the reevaluation of the protection of maternity and working to convince the public of the protection of maternity being a problem of labor to appeal to a wide range of people for support. The KWAU was also active in addressing sexual violence against women. In April 1992, KWAU established a Special Committee for the Legislation of a Special Law against Sexual Violence. This led to the government announcing "substantial proposals against sexual violence including legislation of a special law."

Between 1992 and 1993, KWAU focused on developing a large social campaign calling for the abolition of sexual violence of women in society. In addition, KWAU formed an alliance of concerned women corresponding with the presidential election during this time. This alliance encouraged presidential candidates to incorporate the enactment of a sexual violence protection law into their campaign platforms. KWAU can be credited with advocating for the amendment of the "Sexual Equality Employment Act," the enactment of the "Infant Care Act," the defense against the abolition of menstruation leave, and resistance to the enactment of the "Act on Worker Dispatch System."

By the mid-1990s, the women's movement was largely focused on advancing its agenda through a "woman's perspective" of viewing society. In 1994, KWAU shifted its objectives slightly and worked to promote the cooperation between women's organizations in an effort to create unity. Women's welfare also saw an increased role in the goals of KWAU during this time. The strategies utilized to further these objectives included lobbying for the passage and improvement of laws and institutions that promoted women's rights and interests, implementing programs for women's welfare and female workers in general, and advocating for certain programs that enhanced national unification.

KWAU also placed focus on women's participation and representation in local politics. By 1995, the organization had helped to significantly increase women's participation in politics through recruiting and promoting female candidates; 14 out of 17 of which were elected that year. Also in 1995, KWAU was granted legal status by the government.

With the election of President Roh Moo-Hyun in December 2002, KWAU saw a new opportunity to further women's causes and empowerment. A few of the new administration's key national priorities included advocating for the "realization of a society with gender equality" and "the abolition of the family-head system." Along with these tasks, the Roh Moo-Hyun administration focused on the necessity and importance of active participation of civil society and often recruited from some of the main supportive organizations when seeking nominees for appointment to significant government positions.

In this process, Chi Eun-hee, the then President of KWAU resigned her position to join the administration ultimately becoming the Minister of Gender Equality. This appointment allowed Chi Eun-hee to implement the feminist agenda in close consultation with active members in KWAU at the time. Another example of this increased influence was Han Myeong-sook, who was a past president of KWAU and was appointed Minister of the Environment.

== See also ==
- Gender inequality in South Korea
- Women in South Korea
