= The Bacchus Lady =

2016 film

- Theatrical poster
- Hangul: 죽여주는 여자
- Lit.: The Killer Woman
- RR: Jugyeojuneun yeoja
- MR: Chugyŏjunŭn yŏja
- Directed by: E J-yong
- Written by: E J-yong
- Produced by: Suh Dong-hyun
- Starring: Youn Yuh-jung
- Cinematography: Kim Young-no
- Edited by: Ham Sung-won
- Music by: Jang Young-gyu; Kim Sun
- Production companies: Korean Academy of Film Arts; Korean Film Council
- Distributed by: CGV Arthouse
- Release dates: 12 February 2016 (Berlin); 6 October 2016 (South Korea)
- Running time: 110 minutes
- Country: South Korea
- Language: Korean

The Bacchus Lady (Korean: 죽여주는 여자, The Killer Woman) is a 2016 South Korean drama film directed and written by E J-yong. It was shown in the Panorama section at the 66th Berlin International Film Festival as well as the Seattle International Film Festival. The director describes the film as a "bittersweet drama".

The film depicts the life of a Bacchus Lady named Youn So-young.

== Synopsis ==
The story of a Bacchus lady, Youn Yuh-jung.

The award-winning 2016 South Korean film The Bacchus Lady, directed by E J-yong, brings attention to elderly poverty, particularly women, portraying the struggles and humanity of one such woman navigating this harsh reality.

A "Bacchus Lady" is a term used in South Korea to describe elderly women, typically in their 50s and 60s, who engage in prostitution to earn a living. The name comes from "Bacchus-F" a popular energy drink in South Korea, which these women originally sold to elderly men in public parks and plazas as a pretext to initiate conversations and offer sexual services.

== Cast ==
- Youn Yuh-jung as So-Young
- Jeon Moo-song as Jae-Woo
- Yoon Kye-sang as Do-Hoon
- Ye Soo-jung as Bok-hee
- Park Seung-tae as eyebrow tattoo woman
- An A-zu
- Choi Hyun-jun
- Joo In-young as Migration center employee
- Kim Hye-yoon as Nurse
- Nash Ang as Filipino seller

== Awards and nominations ==
Year	Award	Category	Recipient	Result	Ref.
2016	10th Asia Pacific Screen Awards	Jury Grand Prize	Youn Yuh-jung	Nominated	
2016	10th Asia Pacific Screen Awards	Best Actress	Youn Yuh-jung	Nominated	
2016	20th Fantasia Festival	Best Actress	Youn Yuh-jung	Won	
2016	37th Blue Dragon Film Awards	Best Actress	Youn Yuh-jung	Nominated	
2017	53rd Baeksang Arts Awards	Grand Prize (Daesang)	Youn Yuh-jung	Nominated	
2017	53rd Baeksang Arts Awards	Best Actress	Youn Yuh-jung	Nominated	
2017	26th Buil Film Awards	Best Actress	Youn Yuh-jung	Won	
2017	4th Wildflower Film Awards	Best Actress	Youn Yuh-jung	Nominated	
2017	22nd Chunsa Film Art Awards	Best Actress	Youn Yuh-jung	Nominated	
