= Prostitution in South Korea =

Prostitution in South Korea is illegal, but according to the Korea Women's Development Institute, the sex trade in Korea was estimated to amount to 14 trillion South Korean won ($13 billion) in 2007, roughly 1.6% of the nation's GDP. According to a survey conducted by the Department of Urology at the Korea University College of Medicine in 2015, 23.1% of males and 2.6% of females, aged 18–69, had sexual experience with a prostitute.

The sex trade involved some 94 million transactions in 2007, down from 170 million in 2002. The number of prostitutes dropped by 18% to 269,000 during the same period. The amount of money traded for prostitution was over 14 trillion won, much less than 24 trillion won in 2002. Despite legal sanctions and police crackdowns, prostitution continues to flourish in South Korea, while sex workers continue to actively resist the state's activities.

== History ==
=== Premodern era ===
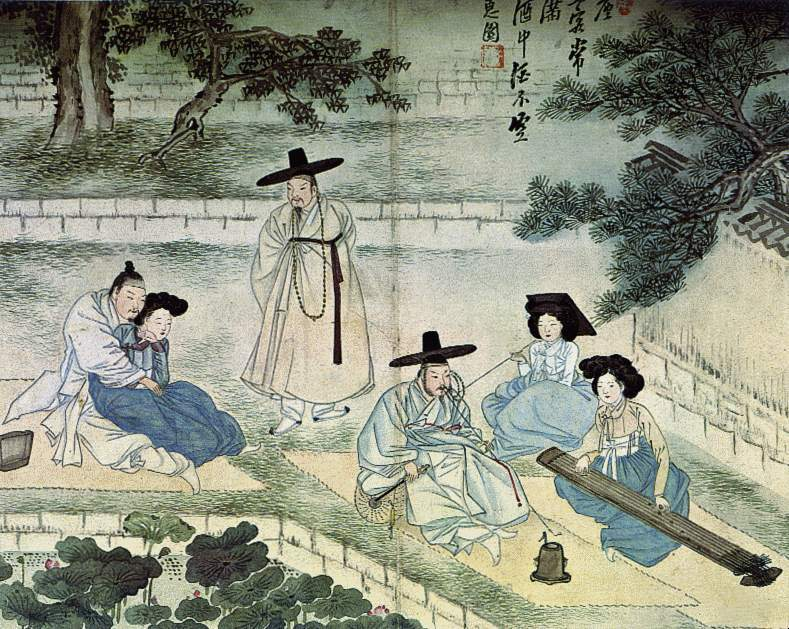
Kisaeng, women from outcast or slave families who were trained to provide entertainment, conversation, and sexual services to men of the upper class.

Before the modernization of Korea, there were no brothels, but a caste of women for the elite landholding classes performed sexual labor. Modernization eliminated the Korean caste system. The first brothels in Korea began to spread after the country opened its first ports in 1876 through a diplomatic pact, causing ethnic quarters for Japanese migrants to sprout up in Busan, Wonsan and Incheon.

=== 1960s: US military ===
From the 1960s to the present day, US camptown prostitution has existed outside US military bases (for example outside Camp Casey and Camp Stanley). This was the result of negotiation between the Korean government and the US military, involving prostitution for United States soldiers in camptowns surrounding the US military bases. The government registered the prostitutes, who were called Western princesses, and required them to carry medical certification.

The US military police provided security at these US camptown prostitution sites, and detained the prostitutes who were thought to be ill, to prevent epidemics of sexually transmitted diseases. This government involvement was in the past motivated in part by fears that the American military, which protected South Korea from North Korea, would leave. Though US officials publicly condemn prostitution, they are perceived as taking little action to prevent it, and some locals suggest that US Army authorities prefer having commercial sex services available to soldiers.

Prostitution establishments are visited by American soldiers, Korean soldiers and Korean civilians. In the beginning most prostitutes were South Korean, with a minority of other women from Europe and Asia. Since the early 2000s most prostitutes have been Filipina and Russian.

The number of South Korean prostitutes who worked as sex providers for American soldiers and Korean soldiers was between 26,000 and 39,000. This number is according to the research on the number of checkups for venereal diseases from 1953 to 1969 by Professor Lee Young-hoon, an economics professor at Seoul National University. Surveys carried out in the 1950s and 1960s suggest 60% of these prostitutes worked near U.S. military camps.

Korean government (보건사회복지부) figures give 10,000-30,000 prostitutes servicing the U.N./U.S. military in South Korea in 1954, about 20,000 prostitutes in 1966, reducing to 13,000-14,000 in 1969, and reducing to 9,935 in 1977.

Since 2004, the majority of prostitutes have been Filipina or Russian women. South Korean sex workers have become less numerous as Filipina and Russian women were a cheaper labor alternative. With the collapse of the Soviet Union, thousands of Russians migrated to Korea to work as sex entertainers in Korean red light districts, while thousand others were forced into prostitution for both American soldiers and Korean civilian men and soldiers. Since the mid-1990s, foreigners have made up 80–85% of the women working at clubs near military bases. Human traffickers not only brought Russian prostitutes for American and Korean soldiers but also brought in many Russian women through sham marriages with South Korean men. In 2005, Filipina and Russian women became common in many Korean red districts and even accounted for 90 percent of all the prostitutes in U.S. military camptowns.

=== 2000s ===
In 2003, the Korean Ministry of Gender Equality announced that 260,000 women—1 of 25 of young Korean women—might be engaged in the sex industry. The Korea Women's Development Institute suggested that from 514,000 to 1.2 million Korean women participated in the prostitution industry. A similar report by the Korean Institute of Criminology noted that 20% of men in their 20s pay for sex at least four times a month, with 358,000 visiting prostitutes daily.

In 2004, the South Korean government passed an anti-prostitution law (Special Law on Sex Trade 2004) prohibiting the buying and selling of sex and shutting down brothels. Soon afterward, over 2,500 sex workers demonstrated in the streets to demand the repeal of the law, as they believed it threatened their livelihood. In 2006, the Ministry for Gender Equality, in an attempt to address the issue of demand for prostitutes, offered cash to companies whose male employees pledged not to pay for sex after office parties. The people responsible for this policy claimed that they wanted to put an end to a culture in which men get drunk at parties and go on to buy sex.

In 2007 the government announced that sex tourism by Koreans would be made illegal, as well as Korean women going abroad to sell sex. The courts prosecuted 35,000 clients, 2.5 times higher than the number of those who were caught buying sex in 2003. Meanwhile, enforcement is weak and corruption problematic; there is little evidence that new legislation has made much difference, the trade simply finding other ways to carry on its business. However, more men are being sent to "John School" for purchasing sex, while a 2010 investigation suggested that 20% of seniors sought out sex workers.

== Range of services ==
Following the enactment of the Special Law in 2004, there was a crackdown on red-light districts; while many of the brothels in those areas were forced to close, the crackdown ended as quickly as it had begun, with the result that prostitution was driven more underground but also became a more competitive business with lower prices and more services.

Red light districts in South Korea are comparable to those of Amsterdam and Germany. The four main red light districts in South Korea prior to the Special Law were Cheongnyangni 588, Yongsan Station, and Mia-ri in Seoul and Jagalmadang in Daegu. Although they no longer operate at full capacity, some still exist, tolerated not only due to the vast amount of money that is involved in the business, but also in an attempt to control the sex industry.

Other sexual services include 가택 마사지 (gataek massaji), an "in-call" massage where the customer travels to or meets up at the masseuse's home or quarters; 키스방 (kiss bang), rooms where customers pay to French-kiss and fondle women; and 출장 마사지 (chuljang massaji) or an "out-call" massage where the masseuse travels to the customer's place, love motel, hotel, or other agreed location.

=== Teen prostitution ===
According to a 2012 study by the Ministry of Gender Equality and Family, 3% of runaway youths have been exposed to prostitution, either as buyers or prostitutes. There have been reported cases of runaway girls who sell sex over internet chat, and live with "families" in jjimjilbang, or bathhouses, with fellow runaway girls. According to United Voice for Eradication of Prostitution, these teen prostitutes are exposed to such crimes as rape and diseases such as syphilis. Recidivism is common, with over half of the girls counseled by the Voice returning to the sex trade, often because of blackmail from former pimps and social ostracism by future husbands and families.

=== Bacchus Ladies ===
In contrast to teen prostitution, women in their 50s, 60s, and even their 70s called Bacchus Ladies, are engaged in prostitution in a park near the Jongno-3 subway station in the heart of Seoul.

== Sex trafficking ==
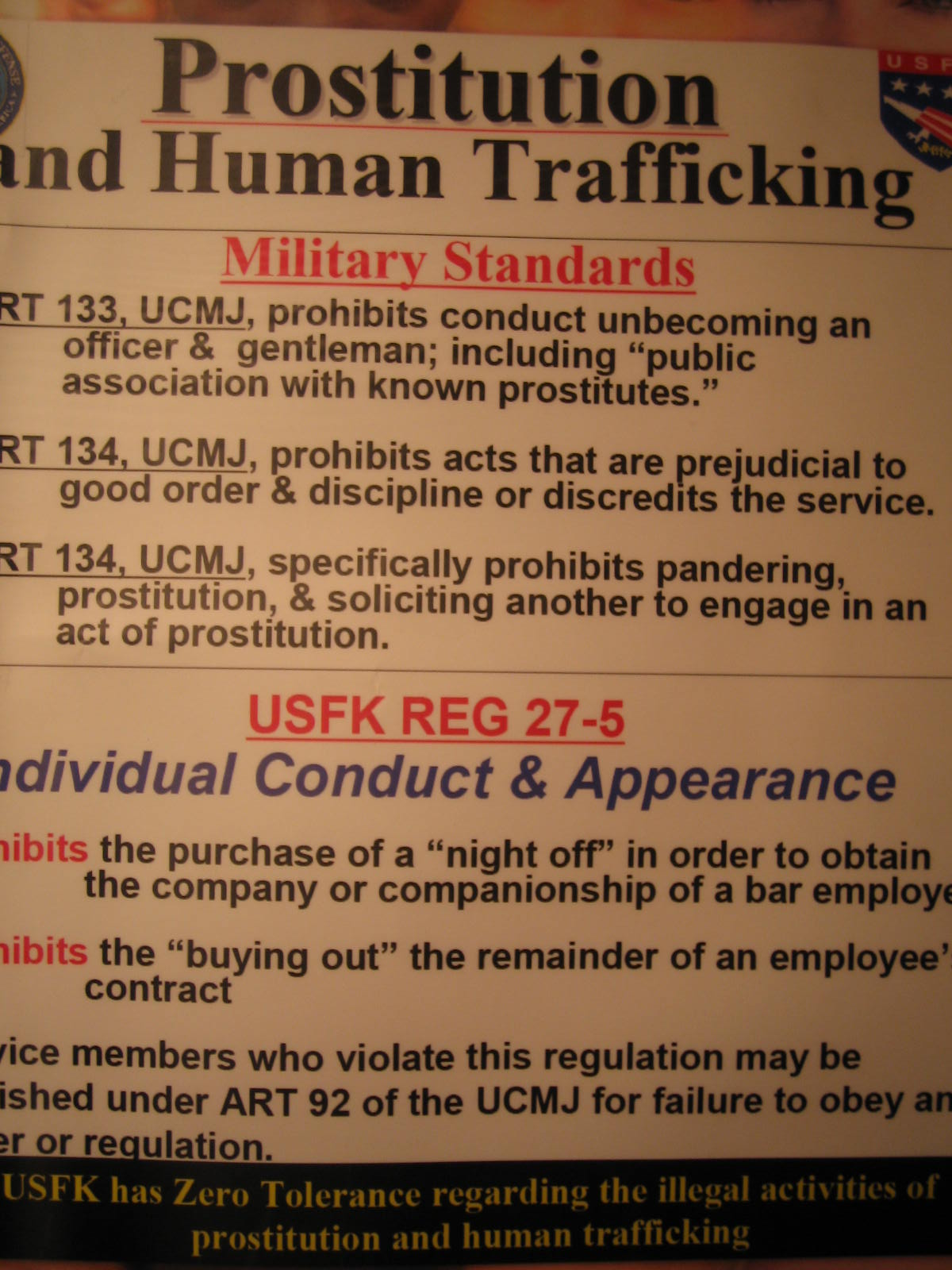
Prostitution and human trafficking notice by the United States Forces Korea

Though as recently as 2004 the government received low marks on the issue, in recent years the government has made significant strides in its enforcement efforts. Human trafficking was outlawed and penalties for prostitution increased; the 2004 Act on the Prevention of the Sex Trade and Protection of its Victims was passed, toughening penalties for traffickers, ending deportation of victims, and establishing a number of shelters for victims. As of 2005, there were 144 people serving jail time for human trafficking.

A US immigration official conceded in 2006 that "There's a highly organized logistical network between Korea and the United States with recruiters, brokers, intermediaries."

A Los Angeles police spokesman said that about 90% of the department's 70–80 monthly arrests for prostitution involve Korean women and the Los Angeles Police Department estimates that there are 8,000 Korean prostitutes working in that city and its suburbs. According to Timothy Lim, the customers of Korean prostitutes in foreign countries are overwhelmingly non-Korean men in massage parlors, while their customers through out-call services, room salons and hostess bars are often 90-100% Korean. This makes clear that demand for Korean women is driven not only by American men "thirsting" for exotic women, but also by Korean men, especially first generation immigrant men or non-immigrant businessmen.

A US State Department report titled "Trafficking in Persons Report: June 2008", states that in "March 2008, a joint operation between the AFP and DIAC broke up a syndicate in Sydney that allegedly trafficked South Korean women to a legal brothel and was earning more than $2.3 million a year. Police allege the syndicate recruited Korean women through deception about the conditions under which they would be employed, organized their entry into Australia under false pretenses, confiscated their travel documents, and forced them to work up to 20 hours a day in a legal Sydney brothel owned by the syndicate."

The US State Department report also states that the South Korean government "fully complies with the minimum standards for the elimination of trafficking". In 2012, the government continued law enforcement efforts against sex trafficking, and signed MOUs for the Employment Placement System (EPS) with five additional countries and conducted numerous anti-trafficking awareness campaigns. The Korean National Police Agency also cooperated with foreign law enforcement agencies to crack down on human smuggling networks.

The United States Department of State Office to Monitor and Combat Trafficking in Persons ranks South Korea as a "Tier 1" country.

== Foreign prostitutes in South Korea ==
South Korea is both a source and destination country for human trafficking. The agencies use high salaries to lure young girls to go to Korea and once they arrive they are forced to work as sex slaves.

=== China ===
Trafficking in Persons Report of the U.S. State Department has mentioned on many occasions that Chinese women are engaged in prostitution in South Korea. The report states that they are issued a formal visa and are engaged in sexual services and sometimes they are sold as international marriage brides and are now sex workers. According to MINISTRY OF JUSTICE REPUBLIC OF KOREA as of 2016, there are 212,115 Chinese women (Han Chinese) staying in Korea. According to “Survey for the migrant women employed in the entertainment business in Korea” presented by Ministry of Gender Equality and Family, it is reported that the largest number of women engaged in commercial sex for South Korean men can be found among Han Chinese women.

According to MBC, the public broadcasting company of Korea, 80% of massage businesses in South Korea correspond to commercial sex establishments where Chinese women work. In 2012, 240 Chinese women were arrested for having prostituted in the massage parlors in Korea. The South Korean newspaper “The Dong-a Ilbo” reveals that sex workers in the so-called “휴게텔” are all composed of Chinese women (Han Chinese and Ethnic Korean Chinese) except “Gangnam” area. As of 2018, female students from China staying in South Korea reach 41,957 and many of them are caught by the press and reported as sex workers.

Chinese women are engaged in prostitution through the country of South Korea such as Seoul, Incheon, Suwon, Pyeongtaek, Yongin, Siheung, Bucheon, Paju, Uijeongbu, Ansan, Anyang, Cheongju, Dangjin, Cheonan, Daejeon, Asan, Daegu, Busan, Gyeongju, Ulsan, Gwangyang, Changwon, Gangwon Province, Jeolla Province and Jeju Island. Chinese women engaged in prostitution practice their commercial sex not only in the cities but also in the rural areas of which the administrative unit corresponds to town and township.

=== Thai ===
According to the Justice Ministry, increasing numbers of Thai women are drawn to illegal "massage work" in the ROK. It estimates that the number of illegal Thai residents soared from 68,449 in 2017 to 122,192 in August 2018. Of the 60,000 who are women, some 50,000 are believed to be working in massage parlors, some of them fronts for prostitution. The owner of one Thai massage parlor in Gangnam said, "Even if I try to run a legitimate business, I have no idea what happens in the room between a client and a masseuse who wants to make more money." Massage parlors are illegal in Korea unless operated by blind people, but around 50,000 offer foot massage, sports massage, and acupressure. They employ some 300,000 workers.

=== Ukrainian ===
A report dated 2002 and released in 2003 asserted that Ukrainian sex-workers were the second largest group of foreign women involved into prostitution outside the US military bases in Republic of Korea.

=== Russian ===
Between January 2000 and March 2001, approximately 6,000 Russian women entered Korea through Busan port and Gimpo. In 2000, 3,064 Russians entered South Korea on E-6 visas, 2,927 of them women (Jhoty, 2001)

== South Korean sex tourists in foreign countries ==
=== China ===
During the Autumn symposium held at Sinyang Humanities Hall of Seoul National University organized by Korean Association of Women's Studies, Jung Jae-won, a senior researcher of Institute for Gender Research of Seoul National University presented the survey results regarding current state of purchase of sexual services practiced by Korean men abroad. According to the survey presentation regarding “international expansion of Korean-type sex industry and commercial sex culture,” Korean men buy sex with Chinese prostitutes all over China.

It is estimated that there are more than 100 brothels (KTV) exclusively for South Korean men in Qingdao of China, and this 100 figure is only for one city. The survey shows that some brothels (KTV) for Korean men each have 150-300 Chinese women engaged in commercial sex. It is reported that a brothel (KTV) in Shanghai where South Korean men are regular customers has more than 500 Chinese prostitutes.

In 2007 it was reported that there were 33 online web sites linking Korean men to Chinese prostitutes. Many Korean men have used sex tours in groups with friends and co-workers. In 2013, the Korea Tourism Association filed a complaint with the police against an Internet site for arranging sex services by Chinese prostitutes for Korean men in China.

According to the 'Center for Women's Human Rights', Korean high school students have bought Chinese prostitutes for sex while on a school field trip to China.

South Korean men continue to be a major source of demand for child sex tourism in China.

=== Southeast Asia ===
South Korean men continue to be a major source of demand for child sex tourism in both Southeast Asia and the Pacific Islands. Child prostitutes in Southeast Asian countries were reportedly patronized mainly by South Korean men, who outstrip Japanese and Chinese as the most numerous sex tourists in the region, with the Philippines, Vietnam, Cambodia, and Thailand mainly seeing South Korean men using child prostitutes.

== Korean prostitutes in foreign countries ==
The South Korean government has expressed concern over its citizens engaging in prostitution in foreign countries like Australia and the United States.

=== Australia ===
As of 2011, more than a thousand Korean women were estimated to work as prostitutes in the Australian sex industry. Korean government officials, expressing concern that many are victims of sex trafficking, have requested that the Australian authorities step up enforcement efforts.

=== United States ===
Thousands of South Korean women are trafficked to the United States to work as prostitutes in massage parlors. American authorities arrested hundreds of Korean women for prostitution in the five years leading up to 2011, with the 2008 Korea-US Visa Waiver Program leading to an additional increase in the number of Korean prostitutes in America. The number of people who operate trafficking rackets to ship Korean women into the sex trade in America reaches into the thousands.

=== China and Taiwan ===
Korean prostitutes worked in Taiwan during the Japanese colonial period.

A ring of South Korean prostitutes, composed of 21 Korean women ranging in age from 24 to 37, serving Chinese men was busted in Macau in 2015.

Some Korean women wear kimonos while working as prostitutes in Macau.

=== Japan ===
In 2013, police broke up a racket trafficking women to Japan from Korea. In 2014, it was reported that websites promoting South Korean prostitutes in Japan have been blocked within South Korea by the government.

== See also ==
- Kisaeng
- Prostitutes in South Korea for the U.S. military
