= Poverty in South Korea =

Poverty rate (after taxes and transfers) in South Korea equates to approximately 14.6% as of 2013

Poverty in South Korea has been in drastic decline since the mid-20th century, particularly the absolute poverty rate. Relative poverty was also in decline until the late 1990s, rose in the aftermath of the Asian Financial Crisis, and has been in decline since the 2010s. While only about 2% of South Koreans are affected by absolute poverty today, about 14-15% of these 2% are elderly and are affected by relative poverty. Elderly relative poverty has been in consistent decline since 2011, according to the OECD.

== Trends ==
The poverty rate of elderly people in South Korea is the highest among the OECD countries

Poverty rate in South Korea (age 65+) in 2011

Choo, Park and Yoon noted that both absolute and relative poverty have declined in Korea from 1965 to 1990. They concluded that "rapid economic growth during [the analyzed period of 1960s-1980s] in Korea has alleviated poverty to a great extent". Philips et al. praised South Korea, noting that "South Korea has experienced one of the most dramatic declines in absolute poverty that the world has seen". They added that while over half of the Korean population was affected by absolute poverty in mid-1950s, absolute poverty had declined to only about 3.4 percent of the population by the mid-1990s. As of 2001, absolute poverty was below 2% (however, another estimate for 2000 cited 11.5%). However, more recent data suggests that relative poverty has been on the rise, growing from about 8% in the early 1990s to 15% as of 2012.

According to official estimates, about 15% of South Koreans live below the poverty line. Poverty in South Korea is defined as relative poverty. Relative poverty is not the same as absolute poverty: relative poverty measures the share of the population living on less than half of the median income. (Median income in South Korea in 2007 was $19,179 (W20m).) South Korea continues to have the highest old-age poverty rate among OECD member countries, a position it has held since 2009. According to Statistics Korea, the relative poverty rate (based on disposable income) among people aged 65 and older fell to 35.9% in 2024, down 2.3 percentage points from the previous year; the rate has fluctuated but broadly declined since 2012. Depending on the data source and methodology, recent estimates of the elderly poverty rate range from about 36% to 40% (for example, 38.2% for 2023), remaining roughly three times the OECD average.

On November 15, 2021, according to reports, South Korea ranks fourth in the world in terms of relative poverty among major economies.

== Poverty among Korean elderly ==
In the rapidly aging demographics in South Korea, many elderly require healthcare. Studies taken across many demographics concluded that South Korean elderly with low income lack proper social protection from the government and are the most disadvantaged. In recent years “the proportion of aged 65 and older among people with disabilities has quickly increased, from 30.3% to 43.3% in 2014”. That makes South Korea the leader in this aspect as 3 times the growth as compared to the international average. This is consistent with South Korea having one of the highest life expectancies, which has been growing in recent years.

26 percent of Korean elderly lived in poverty in 2008. Among OECD countries, the poverty risk is higher for South Korea's elderly. While the number of elders living in poverty increases every year for many countries, South Korea remains with the highest poverty rate of people aged over 65 among the OECD countries. Moreover, the poverty risk is particularly high for the South Korean elderly who are less educated, living alone, living in a rural area, or are not in good health. Many low-income elderly individuals are currently living with their children, which are often providing them with financial aid, and many also depend on welfare transfers. Overall, the poverty rate for the elderly has been consistently declining since 2011, according to OECD data.

== Reasons for poverty ==
OECD listed several factors among the reasons for poverty in Korea. First, public social spending in South Korea is low. Social spending by the government in South Korea was 7.6% of GDP in 2007, compared to the OECD average of 19%. This can be explained by the Korean traditional reliance on family and the private sector to provide such services. Second, Korea's dualistic labour market, in which a significant number of workers are hired only on temporary contracts with low wages and benefits, results in high inequality in wage income.

== Income inequality ==
South Korea, along with many other East Asian countries, has been known for very equal distribution of income and wealth. However, this has been changing over the last few decades. Statistics show that in the 1990s, income equality reached a peak and has declined since then. This may be in part due to the country's rapid economic growth. In a now more competitive job market, the head of the household or householder is expected to be more educated, which makes it hard for rural families to compete with a lack of access to higher education, subsequently resulting in income inequality between urban and rural areas. Some attribute income inequality to a change in traditional household head dynamics in South Korea. An increase in single headed households and a stiflingly low access to new jobs has created a financially challenging situations for many families in South Korea, leading many not to have families at all. Income inequality has been declining since 2016, according to OECD data.

== Welfare state ==
Historically, South Korea harshly repressed trade unions. Many trade unions and the opposition groups they represent have been shut down by the government. It was only within the last decade that a social security has been set up for the elderly, but many elderly still live in extreme poverty despite help from the government. South Korea has a comprehensive national healthcare for all of its citizens.

== Double poverty ==
South Korea has the second longest average working hours in the world according to the OECD. The average working hours among all employed Koreans was 1,967 in 2019, despite this, the average annual wage in Korea sits at $41,960. Below the OECD average of $49,165. The percentage of low wage workers in South Korea also exceeds the OECD average, 17% to 13.8%. Because of this, many working Koreans below the poverty line suffer from "time poverty" in addition to income poverty. This creates a condition known as double poverty, wherein workers suffer from low wages and long hours indefinitely.

== Women in poverty ==
Women in South Korea are more vulnerable to both income and time poverty. Factors associated with women's poverty include the gender wage gap, discriminatory employment practices, unequal household responsibilities, limited pension benefits, and further financial difficulties faced by female-led households.

Older women make up the most vulnerable demographic in Korea. Many older women had few opportunities to participate in formal employment, and thus entire retirement with low savings and insufficient pension income. Approximately 54% of south Korean women aged over 65 experienced relative poverty in 2022, compared to 32.6% of men in the same age group. Women who spend substantial portions of their working lives performing unpaid housework have particularly limited financial resources in old age.

Gender inequality in the South Korean labor market is another significant factor associated with women's poverty. Women are more likely than men to experience career interruptions, employment insecurity, and concentration in lower-paid occupations. They are also disproportionately represented in non-regular employment, including temporary and part-time positions, which may provide fewer benefits and less financial stability. The gender wage gap further contributes to economic inequality. According to the OECD, South Korea had the largest gender wage gap among OECD countries in 2023, with men's median wages approximately 29% higher than women's. Women with children may face additional financial disadvantages because of the unequal distribution of childcare and household responsibilities. according to OECD data, Korean men’s average housework was 49 minutes per day, while women’s housework was 215 minutes per day. The OECD has documented substantial long-term earnings losses among South Korean mothers following childbirth, partly associated with career interruptions and transitions into non-regular employment.

The South Korean government has introduced policies designed to reduce poverty and improve women's economic security. These include the National Basic Livelihood Security System, public pension programs, childcare subsidies, employment support initiatives, and assistance for single-parent families.The government has also implemented policies intended to encourage women's participation in the workforce and improve work-family balance. Despite these measures, gender-based income inequality and old-age poverty remain significant social and economic challenges.

== See also ==
- Economy of South Korea#History
- Miracle on the Han River – Rapid economic growth period
