= Geunuhoe =

1927–1931 Korean women's organization

Geunuhoe (Korean: 근우회; Hanja: 槿友會; Society of the Friends of the Rose of Sharon) was a Korean women's organization founded in June 1927 to promote women's status and the national independence struggle in Korea. Though the founders were mainly Protestants and members of the Young Women's Christian Association (YWCA) and Temperance Union, the organization became dominated by socialists. It was dissolved by the Governor-General of Korea in 1931.
