= The National Women's History Exhibition Hall =

Women's history museum in Goyang, South Korea

- Established: December 9, 2002
- Location: Goyang, South Korea
- Coordinates: 37.635°N 126.834°E
- Type: Women's history museum
- Website: eherstory.mogef.go.kr (available in English)

The National Women's History Exhibition Hall (NWHEH; Korean: 국립여성사전시관) is a women's history museum in Goyang, South Korea. It is located on the first and second floors of the Goyang government complex.

It first opened in the Women's Plaza in Daebang-dong, Seoul, South Korea on December 9, 2002, as the first women's history museum in South Korea. It became a national museum in 2012.

The museum moved to Goyang on September 1, 2014, because its previous location was leased to it for free for a period of ten years.
