= Korean National Council of Women =

Women's organization in South Korea

The Korean National Council of Women (KNCW; Korean: 한국여성단체협의회) is a women's organization in South Korea, founded in 1959. Along with the younger Korean Women's Associations United (KWAU), KNCW helps coordinate non-governmental organization activities dealing with women's issues and feminism throughout Korea.

The Korean Women's movement had been interrupted during the Japanese Occupation of 1910-1945, and emerged again in the late 1940s after the War. In 1959, 64 women's associations united to create the Korean National Council of Women as their umbrella organization. Its purpose was to improve women's rights and status, specifically to reform the discriminating Family Law of 1957 as a united force.

The KNCW campaigned and petitioned the government for a revision of the Family in 1962 and 1975. The revision of 1977 was however far from satisfying. It was not until 1991 that a major revision was made of the Family Law. The KNCW worked to change the system from within the political system of the time, also during periods of dictatorship. It remained one of the major women's organizations in South Korea until the 1980s, when it lost its dominating position.

== See also ==
- Women in South Korea
