= List of strikes in South Korea =

Throughout South Korean history, a number of strikes, labour disputes, student strikes, hunger strikes, and other industrial actions have occurred.

== Background ==
A labour strike is a work stoppage caused by the mass refusal of employees to work. This can include wildcat strikes, which are done without union authorisation, and slowdown strikes, where workers reduce their productivity while still carrying out minimal working duties. It is usually a response to employee grievances, such as low pay or poor working conditions. Strikes can also occur to demonstrate solidarity with workers in other workplaces or pressure governments to change policies.

== 20th century ==
=== 1940s ===
- Korean general strike of September 1946
- Autumn Uprising of 1946

=== 1960s ===
- April Revolution

=== 1970s ===
- 1979 YH Trading Company strike

=== 1980s ===
- June Democratic Struggle, including strikes, against the dictatorship of the Fifth Republic of Korea in 1987.
- Great Workers' Struggle, mass wave of strikes in South Korea in 1987 demanding better working conditions and autonomous unions, inspired by the June Democratic Struggle.
- 1988 Hyundai strike, 24-day strike by Hyundai Group workers in South Korea.
- 1988–89 Hyundai strike, 3-month strike by Hyundai workers in South Korea.
- 1989 Daewoo strike

=== 1990s ===
- 1996–1997 strikes in South Korea

== 21st century ==
=== 2000s ===
- 2003 South Korean truckers' strikes
- 2005 Asiana Airlines strike, strike by Asiana Airlines pilots.
- South Korean KTX Train Attendant Union Strike
- 2006 South Korean railroad strike
- E-Land strike
- 2008 US beef protest in South Korea
- 2009 SsangYong strike, 77-day strike by SsangYong Motor workers.

=== 2010s ===
- 2010–2011 Hanjin Heavy Industries strike
- 2012 Hyundai strike
- 2012 South Korean broadcasters' strike
- 2013 railroad strike in South Korea

=== 2020s ===
- 2020 South Korean medical strike
- 2021 Korean Confederation of Trade Unions strike
- 2024 Samsung Electronics strike
- 2024 South Korean medical crisis

== See also ==
- Trade unions in South Korea
- Women in unions in South Korea
