= 2013 railroad strike in South Korea =

22-day strike

2013 railroad strike
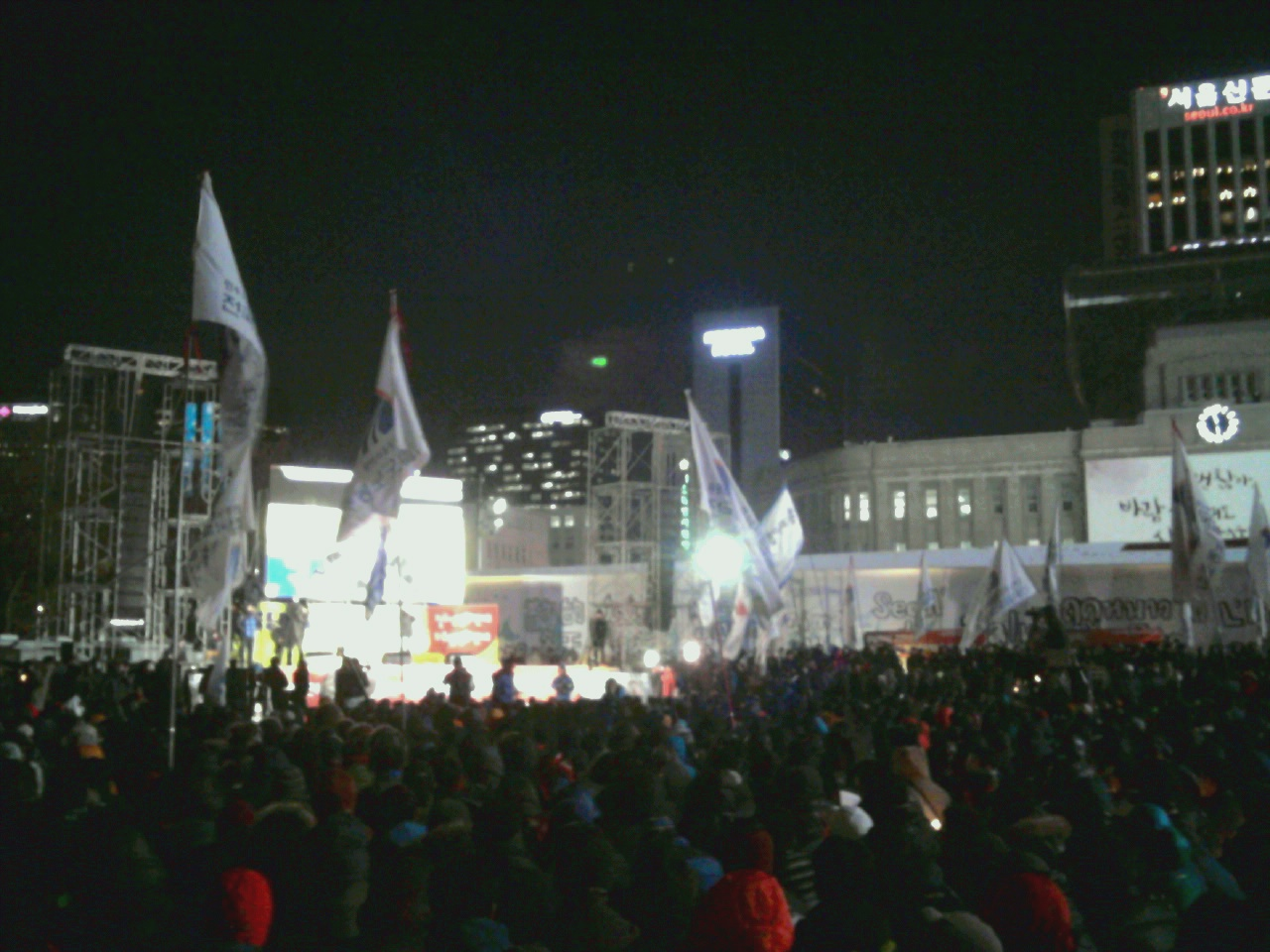
- Protest at Seoul Plaza on December 19.
- Date: 9–30 December 2013
- Location: South Korea
- Caused by: The establishment of the KTX from Suseo's subsidiary company
- Goals: A retraction of the establishment of the KTX from Suseo's subsidiary company; Opposition to privatization plan of government
- Methods: General strike, protests
- Result: Called off the strike and dispersed on their own by the establishment of the Railroad Industry Development Subcommittee in National Assembly

Parties
| Korean Railway Workers' Union: Korean Confederation of Trade Unions; Federation of Korean Trade Unions; Korean Labor Unions Confederation (call off the strike) | Korea Railroad Corporation: (South Korea) Park Geun-hye government; National Police Agency |

Lead figures
| Kim Myeong-hwan, leader of Union | Choi Yeon-hye, president of KORAIL |

The 2013 railroad strike in South Korea was a 22 days general strike by members of the Korea Railroad Corporation Union of Korean Railway Workers' Union and Korean Confederation of Trade Unions, Federation of Korean Trade Unions in South Korea between December 9 and December 30, against the establishment of the KTX from Suseo's subsidiary company of Korail.

== See also ==
- Korean Railway Workers' Union
- Korail
