= Great Workers' Struggle =

1987 labor movement in South Korea

- Part of the Minjung movement and South Korean labor movement
- Date: 5 July – September 1987
- Location: Nationwide, beginning in Ulsan
- Caused by: Poor working conditions; Socioeconomic disparity; Repression of organized labor; June Democratic Struggle
- Methods: Strikes, walkouts, protests, unionization
- Result: Some demands won; Unrest suppressed; Growth of labor unions in South Korea

Parties
Workers	Government of South Korea; Hyundai Group; Daewoo; Other businesses

Lead figures
	(South Korea) Chun Doo-hwan; (South Korea) Roh Tae-woo; Chung Ju-yung

Number
1.22 million (estimated)	

Casualties
- Deaths: 1 worker

The Great Workers' Struggle or Great Labor Struggle (Korean: 노동자 대투쟁) was a series of strikes and labor movement activity in South Korea that followed the June Democratic Struggle in 1987. Relaxation of restrictions on freedom of association following the June 29 Declaration prompted workers and labor organizers to intensify efforts for unionization and improved conditions.

On 5 July, Hyundai Motor Company formed a union in Ulsan. Thereafter, unionization efforts were initiated by workers at other Hyundai Group branches, sparking union busting measures, to which workers responded with protests and industrial actions, spreading outside of Ulsan and to other companies in late July and August.

== Background ==
Since the start of the Cold War, Korea was divided into the pro-Soviet North, officially known as the Democratic Republic of Korea and the pro-U.S. South, officially known as the Republic of Korea. The South Korean government repressed independent labor and left-wing movements, which were seen as potentially sympathetic to the North, especially during and after the Korean War, which continued through the succeeding military dictatorships. A labor movement did not begin to re-emerge until the 1970s, in response to poor and hazardous working conditions with South Korean workers endured during the country's economic boom. However, repression remained commonplace under the authoritarian governments of Park Chung Hee and Chun Doo-hwan. Incidents of violent repression such as the YH incident of 1979 helped to elicit public sympathy, and labor struggles became an important component of the pro-democracy minjung movement of the 1970s and 1980s.

Labor unionization was in many cases, aided by student radicals, who in many cases, took blue collar jobs in order to mobilize workers as part of a broader struggle against the military government. In June 1987, a wave of nationwide protests involving millions of participants forced the government to implement democratic reforms, with the government acquiescing to popular demands for direct presidential elections and increased political freedoms with the June 29 Declaration. However, the document did not significantly alter working conditions, spurring already present labor activists to push for material change.

== Events ==
The Great Workers' Struggle is considered to have begun after Ulsan Hyundai Motor Company workers held a meeting to establish a union in a discotheque on 5 July. Hyundai founder and chairman Chung Ju-yung had a reputation as an anti-union hardliner, and was quoted as saying unions would only be present in the company "when earth covers my eyes". On 16 July, documents for the formation of a similar union at Hyundai Mipo Shipbuilding were stolen, triggering nationwide backlash against Hyundai and further industrial actions nationwide, with strikes spreading through the Yeongnam region in late July. In response, Hyundai announced the formation of a company-controlled union on 24 July, sparking further backlash from workers.

The first strike in the history of Hyundai was held on 28 July, drawing the participation of around 15,000 workers, while strikes quickly spread to other firms. Hyundai Heavy Industries became the site of mass public rallies, while strikes spread to Korea Zinc on August 3, to Hyosung and Taehan Aluminium on August 4, Kyunggi Chemical, Lucky Ulsan and Hansung Enterprises on August 5, and Jinyang on August 6. Demands made by workers during the struggle included eight-hour days, the repeal of anti-union laws, the right to organize and the improvement of working conditions and wages. By August 12, shipments from Busan, South Korea's largest port, had been suspended, and Minister of Labor Lee Hun-ki estimated that the cost of labor disruption had already reached US$125 million in lost production and US$55 million in exports. On August 17, Hyundai workers successfully broke through an attempted company lockout, sparking spontaneous large-scale street demonstrations from workers that continued the following day. On August 18, the government intervened by summoning Hyundai executives to a meeting and urging them to recognize new unions. On August 22, Lee Suk-kyu, a Daewoo worker, was killed after being struck on the chest from a police tear gas canister. The day after he was killed, around 5000 student and worker activists held a meeting at Yonsei University, where they agreed to work in unison but independently, and to emphasize workers' autonomy. Lee's funeral on August 28 saw mobilization across the country, with police arresting over 933 people, detaining 64 and seizing Lee's corpse during the funeral procession at Mangweol-dong in Gwangju. Those arrested included Lee So-sun and future President Roh Moo-hyun. A total of 2,552 labor disputes were recorded in August out of a total of 3,749 for all of 1987, whereas the entirety of 1986 only saw 276 disputes.

In September, authorities cracked down on unrest. On September 4, a large detachment of riot police arrested 508 workers in Ulsan, including those who had been occupying the city hall for the past two days. The government launched a media campaign accusing unions of communist sympathies and perpetuating claims of violence from labor organizers. On September 5, the state cabinet held a televised meeting with the director of the Federation of Korean Industries (FKI), providing him with a platform to attack the movement. 35 pastors in Seoul and Incheon went on hunger strike at the FKI headquarters in protest, but were removed by riot police. The Hyundai Heavy Industries union eventually settled for a 15% pay rise, which became standard at other companies. While industrial labor activity decreased during September, activity an increase in farmer organizing took place as many workers returned to rural areas for harvest festivals, and tenant farmers sat in at the headquarters of Samyang in Seoul. The Hyundai Heavy Industries union eventually settled for a 15% pay rise, which became standard at other companies. On September 29, the government announced its intention to introduce reforms to make workers "a middle class".

== Legacy ==
The events of 1987 have been described as marking the start of the post-dictatorship independent labor movement in South Korea. Wages increases in South Korea averaged 11.6% in 1987, 19.6% in 1988 and 25.3% in 1989, while union membership nearly doubled from 1.04 million in 1986 to 1.98 million in 1990. Around 4,000 new unions representing 700,000 workers were established in 1987.

== See also ==
- 1996–1997 strikes in South Korea
- Hyundai and unions
