= Korean Labor Unions Confederation =

- Merged into: FKTU
- Founded: November 29, 2011
- Headquarters: Seongdong District, Seoul, South Korea
- Location: South Korea
- Key people: Jung Yeon-su
- Website: www.kluc.or.kr

Korean name
- Hangul: 국민노동조합총연맹
- Hanja: 國民勞動組合總聯盟
- RR: Gungmin nodongjohap chongyeonmaeng
- MR: Kungmin nodongjohap ch'ongyŏnmaeng

Short name
- Hangul: 국민노총
- Hanja: 國民勞總
- RR: Gungminnochong
- MR: Kungminnoch'ong

The Korean Labor Unions Confederation (KLUC; Korean: 국민노동조합총연맹) was a national trade union centre of South Korea established in 2011, and the union merged into Federation of Korean Trade Unions in 2014.

== See also ==
- Korean Confederation of Trade Unions (KCTU)
- Federation of Korean Trade Unions (FKTU)
- Trade unions in South Korea
