= Timeline of strikes in 2006 =

Strikes in 2006

In 2006, a number of labour strikes, labour disputes, and other industrial actions occurred.

== Background ==
A labour strike is a work stoppage caused by the mass refusal of employees to work. This can include wildcat strikes, which are done without union authorisation, and slowdown strikes, where workers reduce their productivity while still carrying out minimal working duties. It is usually a response to employee grievances, such as low pay or poor working conditions. Strikes can also occur to demonstrate solidarity with workers in other workplaces or pressure governments to change policies.

== Timeline ==
=== Continuing strikes from 2005 ===
- Bolivian gas conflict
- 2005–06 Cameroon Airlines strike
- 2005–06 Northwest Airlines strike, strike by Northwest Airlines mechanists in the United States.
- 2005–06 NYU strike, strike by New York University graduate students, represented by the Graduate Student Organizing Committee.
- Vatukoula mine strike. 33-year strike by gold miners at the Vatukoula mine in Fiji between 1991 and 2024.

=== February ===
- 2006 Minor League Baseball umpire strike
- University of Miami Justice for Janitors campaign
- 2006 youth protests in France

=== March ===
- 2006 OPSEU strike. 18-day strike by college staff in Ontario, Canada, represented by the Ontario Public Service Employees Union.
- 2006 South Korean railroad strike
- South Korean KTX Train Attendant Union Strike

=== May ===
- 2006 Dhaka strikes
- 2006 Oaxaca rebellion
- 2006 Toronto Transit Commission wildcat strike

=== August ===
- 2006 Escondida strike. 25-day strike by miners at the Escondida mine in Chile.
- 2006 Progressive Enterprises dispute

=== September ===
- 2006 Palestinian teachers' strike, 2-month strike by teachers over unpaid wages.

=== November ===
- 2006 Makerere University strike. Strike by lecturers at Makerere University in Uganda.

=== December ===
- 2006–07 Egyptian textile strikes, series of strikes at the Misr Spinning and Weaving Company.
