= E-Land Group =

South Korean conglomerate

- Native name: 이랜드그룹
- Company type: Private
- Industry: Conglomerate
- Founded: 1980; 46 years ago Ewha Womans University, South Korea
- Founder: Park Sung-su
- Headquarters: Seoul, South Korea
- Area served: Asia; United States; Europe
- Key people: Sung-kyung Park (CEO and vice-chairman); Byeong-Gwon Kim (CEO); Jong-yang Choi (President)
- Services: Fashion, retail, dining, construction
- Subsidiaries: E-world; E-Land construction E-Land services Nettie Sean dotcom E-Land system Lead one Belle Perez; E-Land retail E-Land Park; E-Land cruises
- Website: eland.co.kr en.eland.com

E·Land Group (Korean: 이랜드그룹) is a South Korean conglomerate headquartered in Changjeon-dong Mapo-gu Seoul, South Korea. E-Land Group takes part in retail malls, restaurants, theme parks, hotels, and construction businesses as well as its cornerstone, fashion apparel business. It has operations worldwide through its subsidiary E-Land World. In 2023, E-Land Group has 15,132 employees and sales are KRW 4.592 trillion.

== History ==
E-Land started as a 6 square metres clothing shop on a fashion street in front of Ewha University in Sinchon in 1980. E-Land's first ever brand was called "England", which later changed to "E-Land" due to restrictions on trademark registration.

In 1994, E-Land Group introduced the first outlet in Korean market by opening the first store of 2001 Outlet. It took a form of multi story outlet stores with groceries, houseware and apparel.

In 2003, E-Land Group purchased a 75% stake in New Core, a department store operating in 25 different locations in Korea. Following the acquisition, New Core was transformed to and operated as two department stores and 15 fashion premium outlets.

In 2005, E-Land Group became the 37th largest corporation in Korea (excluding SOE's) with assets totaling over US$2 billion. In April 2006, E-Land Group acquired the entire South Korean operations of Carrefour which operated 32 discount stores. Carrefour Korea, despite its global presence and experiences overseas, struggled to understand the local Korean culture. Carrefour was rebranded to Homever by E-Land Group after the acquisition. The acquisition moved E-Land Group from 6th to 2nd largest discount/outlet operators with respect to total number of stores. In 2006, E-Land Group was the second largest retailer in South Korea based on number of stores (Source: Korea Rating). On 14 May 2008, the British retail group Tesco, which already operated in Korea, agreed to purchase 36 hypermarkets with a combination of food and non-food products from E-Land for $1.9 billion (976 million pounds) in its biggest single acquisition, making Tesco the second largest retailer in the country. The majority of the E-Land stores formerly belonged to French retailer Carrefour before 2006 and most of the stores will be converted to Tesco Homeplus outlets. Tesco's South Korean discount store chain, Home Plus, currently has 66 outlets.

On 16 December 2011, E-Land purchased Elizabeth Taylor's Krupp Diamond ring for $8,818,500 (including buyer's premium). It planned to put it on display at their E-World theme park in Daegu.

On April 14, 2014, E-Land Group announced that they will found professional football club based in Seoul and Seoul E-Land FC are competing in K League Challenge (Second division) since 2015.

When E-Land refurbished the group's website in June 2022, it boldly broke the framework of the company's official website, and introduced a public home featuring "magazine-type content." As a result, the number of visitors to the official website exceeded 15 million in 2024.

== Description ==
The E-Land Group focuses on the production and distribution of consumer goods that include apparel, groceries and housewares. Products are sold through two different channels: approximately 5,000 franchise stores and 59 e-Land-owned stores. The Group's current retail business comprises Kim's Club, NC Department Store, NewCore Outlet, 2001 Outlet, and DongA Department Store. Its portfolio includes infant wear, children's wear, women's wear, sports wear and underwear and a multitude of channels such as outlets, department stores and super supermarkets.

E-Land Group owns 60 brands in Korea.

- Casual: Brenntano, Underwood, Hunt, R.Athletic, Teenie Weenie, Who.A.U, Shane Jeans, So Basic, There's, Coin, C.o.a.x, Prich, G-Star, SPAO
- Deco & Netishion (Women's): Deco, Ana Capri, Telegraph, XIX, Dia, EnC, 96 New York, A6
- Women, kids, underwear and accessories: Mandarina Duck, Belfe, Lario 1898, Coccinelle, Peter Scott, Lochcarron of Scotland, E-Land Junior, Underwood School, l Ohoo, Little Brenn, Roem Girls, The Day Girl, Cocorita, Usall, New Golden, Hunt Kids, Caps, Vianni Kids, Cheek, Entetee, Celden, Hunt Innerwear, The Day Underwear, Eblin, Petit, Lin, Body Pop, Roem, The Day, 2Me, Teresia, Fiorucci, Clovis, Lloyd, Clue, Vianni, Eco Mart, Paw in Paw, OIX, Vicman, OIX Milano, NIX21, Marie Claire, OST, Beall, MIXXO, MIXXO Secret
- Brands operated by E-Land under license in South Korea: New Balance, Berghaus, Ellesse, K-Swiss
- Hotel, restaurant, construction: Lexington Hotel, Kensington Resort, Kensington Flora Hotel, Ashley, Pizza Mall, Rimini, Cafe Lugo, The Caffe, EWorld Daegu (Former Woobang Land), E-land Cruise (Former Han Liver Cruise)
- Restaurants: Ashley (New England–style family), Rimini (Italian restaurant), Pizza Mall (Italian-style pizza bar)

=== 2001 Outlet ===
2001 Outlet (Korean: 이천일 아울렛) is a South Korean retailer headquartered in Seoul, Korea. The outlet franchise is an affiliate of E-Land Group, which is also running another outlet chain, NewCore Outlet. The company operates product shops and the outlet and retail chain of Korean department stores. In addition to its Korean operations, the company also operates business establishments in Seoul, Incheon, Gyeonggi-do and other Korea local chains.

==== Stores ====
- Junggye Store in Nowon-gu, Seoul
- Cheonho Store in Gangdong-gu, Seoul
- Bupyeong Store in Bupyeong-gu, Incheon
- Anyang Store in Manan-gu, Anyang, Gyeonggi-do
- Bundang Store in Bundang-gu, Seongnam, Gyeonggi-do

== Controversy ==
Although there is a policy to leave employees to autonomous decisions, it is said that unpaid leave was signed in a coercive atmosphere. "There was no coercion to overcome the difficult situation together," the management said. This incident was adapted into the movie "Cart" and the webtoon and TV series "Songgot: The Piercer."

In January 2017, due to controversy over unpaid wages for part-timers, he issued an apology and dismissed the CEO of E-Land Park, an affiliate. In addition, disciplinary measures such as dismissal, demotion and salary reduction were taken to the relevant executives and employees.

== See also ==
- Economy of South Korea
- List of South Korean companies
- Seoul E-Land FC
- E-land strike
