= Women factory workers in South Korea =

Women Factory Workers in South Korea In the late 1920s, it was the time when women entered the manufacturing industries and factories. In Korea, we call factory women workers as Yo Gong (여공) which letters came from a Chinese character (女工). Specifically, "yo" means (女 female) and "gong" means (工 work). Most of the South Korean female factory workers were unmarried single and were mostly very young. Also, their derogatory name was Gongsuni (공순이) which is a combination of the word common woman's name (Gongdori) and factory (Gong Jang).

== History ==
One of the well-known protests was 1976 Naked Demonstration. During 1976, there was a Naked Demonstration by female workers at the Dong-il Textile Company. It was one of the significant protests by women, where they only wore bras and panties and confronted police and government. The police dragged and screamed at these protesters. This was the first protest for South Korean women workers where they were able to confront and claim their own rights with courage. Not only there was a Naked Demonstration but there was also another significant event which was Korean Women Textile Workers Fighting for Fair Union Election from 1976 to 1978.

This fight prolonged for two years and was one of the most impressive protests among women protest. During 1970, the South Korean economy was difficult and was heavily depending and relying on the profits by gaining low industrial cheap products. Most of the products were chemical and apparel products. As factories required women workers to work more hours to produce more cheap products, their working hours had extended over the years. Also, in 1973, the "New Factory Movement" was known as (Kongjang Saemaul Undong), did support workers to identify who they really were.

== Personal life and struggles ==
In the beginning, most of the factories imposed workers to work overnight until Saturday and allowed them to rest on every Sunday. Factory management sets this rule because they cared about workers' health and their conditions. However, in most of the cases, it didn't last long. Later overnight work was added and even extended on the other days. As workers repeated this routine, the women workers became more sensitive and had a great tense in working places.

As this tension continued, it leads to arguments and fights among workers in factories. Some factories had an air conditioner, but someplace didn't. Since some factories didn't have any fans for workers, they were sweating all the times and faced physical exhaustion which eventually leads factory workers to use abusive and coarse language to each other. The manager of the factory workers usually pressured workers to come out of the factory even though they were severely injured or sick.

This didn't only apply to women workers in South Korea, but it also applied to all the workers in South Korea including both females and males. Within and outside the factory, management controlled their lives and workers sincerely hoped and sought liberation from the cage of "work". Factory women workers also struggled with the multiplicity of their identity, being a mother, daughter, student, worker, friend, and sister.

According to the KOSIS (Korea Statistical Information Service), the rate of age 15 and older women workers were working reaching 52.7 percent in 2016. As there were more women workers, the birth rate declined as the population rate decreased when half of the women in South Korea started to work. It not only decreased the population and birth rate, but also caused various types of cancer to factory women workers in South Korea. Most of the ovarian cancer was found from the textile factory workers. Other than ovarian cancer, women workers also suffered from breast cancer, thyroid cancer, uterine cancer, and hair loss.

Most of the women workers got tuberculosis by not eating enough or if the working condition or environment was bad that caused the disease. Not only they struggled with this sickness, but they had trouble dealing with sexual assault and few of the workers were raped by the managers. Even though they were working hard, the workers still strived from the hunger. During the 1970s, women factory workers had struck by saying "too hungry to live, give us food". Hunger was another issue for factory women workers.

== Education ==
The female labor participation rate increased by 20.8% in 35 years from the 1960s. The female labor participation rate increased by urbanization, where large numbers of women moved to cities from urban areas to find jobs. Most of the women looked for their jobs in factories and businesses. From the age of 15, they had been working in factories without studying at middle school and high school during their youth. They didn't have any chance to graduate properly in both primary schools and weren't fully educated compared to other 15-19 aged teenagers who go to school.

From 20 to 24 years old women had the highest percentage of the age group that occupied in the factories among other age groups. In the 1980s, only 66 percent of female workers were educated in primary school. Since they worked from an early age, they didn't have a chance to be fully educated.

== Legal rights ==
Right after there was an economic crisis in South Korea in the 1990s, women workers had to face gender hierarchy in their community and union. In most of the times, women were excluded from the conversation of labor and were taking a major part in public work. Since factory women workers were mostly young, they were hired in very low wages because they had less experience. Therefore, the companies earned huge benefits by using these workers with low wages, extending the working hours longer than usual working hours. The wages that women received was less than half of men's wages in industrial factories.

== See also ==
- Women in unions in South Korea
- Women in South Korea
- Working hours in South Korea
