= Railroad strike =

Railroad strike may refer to:

- Great Railroad Strike of 1877
- Great Railroad Strike of 1922
- Great Southwest Railroad Strike of 1886
- South Korean railroad strike of 2006

See also

- Category:Rail transport strikes
