= Korean unionism =

Korean unionism may refer to

- Trade unions in North Korea
  - General Federation of Trade Unions of Korea, the sole legal trade union in North Korea
- Trade unions in South Korea
- The Korean reunification movement
