= Choi Soon-young (politician) =

South Korean trade unionist and politician (born 1953)

Member of the National Assembly
- In office 30 May 2004 – 29 May 2008
- Constituency: Proportional representation

Personal details
- Born: 1953 (age 72–73) Gangneung, Gangwon Province, South Korea
- Party: Democratic Labor
- Occupation: Trade unionist, textile worker, activist

Korean name
- Hangul: 최순영
- RR: Choe Sunyeong
- MR: Ch'oe Sunyŏng

Choi Soon-young (Korean: 최순영; born 1953) is a South Korean politician and labor activist. As a union leader, she played a significant role in the 1979 YH incident. She went on to serve in the South Korean National Assembly as a member of the Democratic Labor Party from 2004 to 2008.

== Biography ==
Choi Soon-young was born in Gangneung, South Korea, in 1953.

As a teenager, she began working at YH Trading Company, a wig manufacturer in Seoul. She became a leader in the factory's union on its foundation in 1975. In August 1979, she participated in the YH incident, in which female workers at the company went on strike and held a sit-in protest at New Democratic Party headquarters, in reaction to the impending loss of their jobs. Riot police violently broke up the protest, killing one worker, Kim Gyeong-suk, and sparking a political crisis that eventually led to regime change. Choi was arrested and detained until Park Chung Hee's assassination a few months later.

Choi subsequently worked as an advocate for female workers, the environment, and autonomy for local governments. She served on the steering committee of the Korean Women Workers Association and as president of the Bucheon Women Workers Association.

In the 1990s, she ran for office as an independent and served two terms on the Bucheon City Council. At the time, she was one of only five women on the 45-member council. She then joined the Democratic Labor Party, serving as its deputy representative from 2002 to 2004, and she joined its Supreme Council in 2008.

In 2004, Choi was elected to a proportional representation seat in the National Assembly, serving until 2008. While in the National Assembly, she participated in the Steering, Education, and Gender Equality and Family Committees. Then, in 2008, she ran unsuccessfully for a constituency in Bucheon's Wonmi District.

She published an autobiographical essay collection, 당신이라는 선물, 'The Gift That Is You', in 2007.

Choi was married to Hwang Ju-seok, a fellow labor activist, from 1978 until his death in 2007. They had one son, Hwang Min-jae.
