= Labor movement of South Korea =

Unions and unionization drives in South Korea

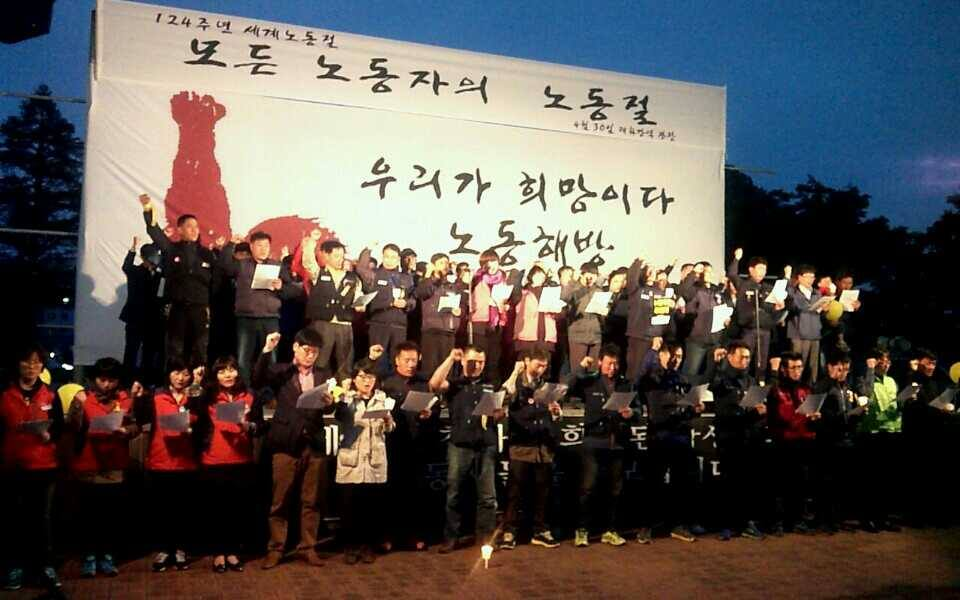
International Workers' Day 2014 at Taehwagang station, Ulsan

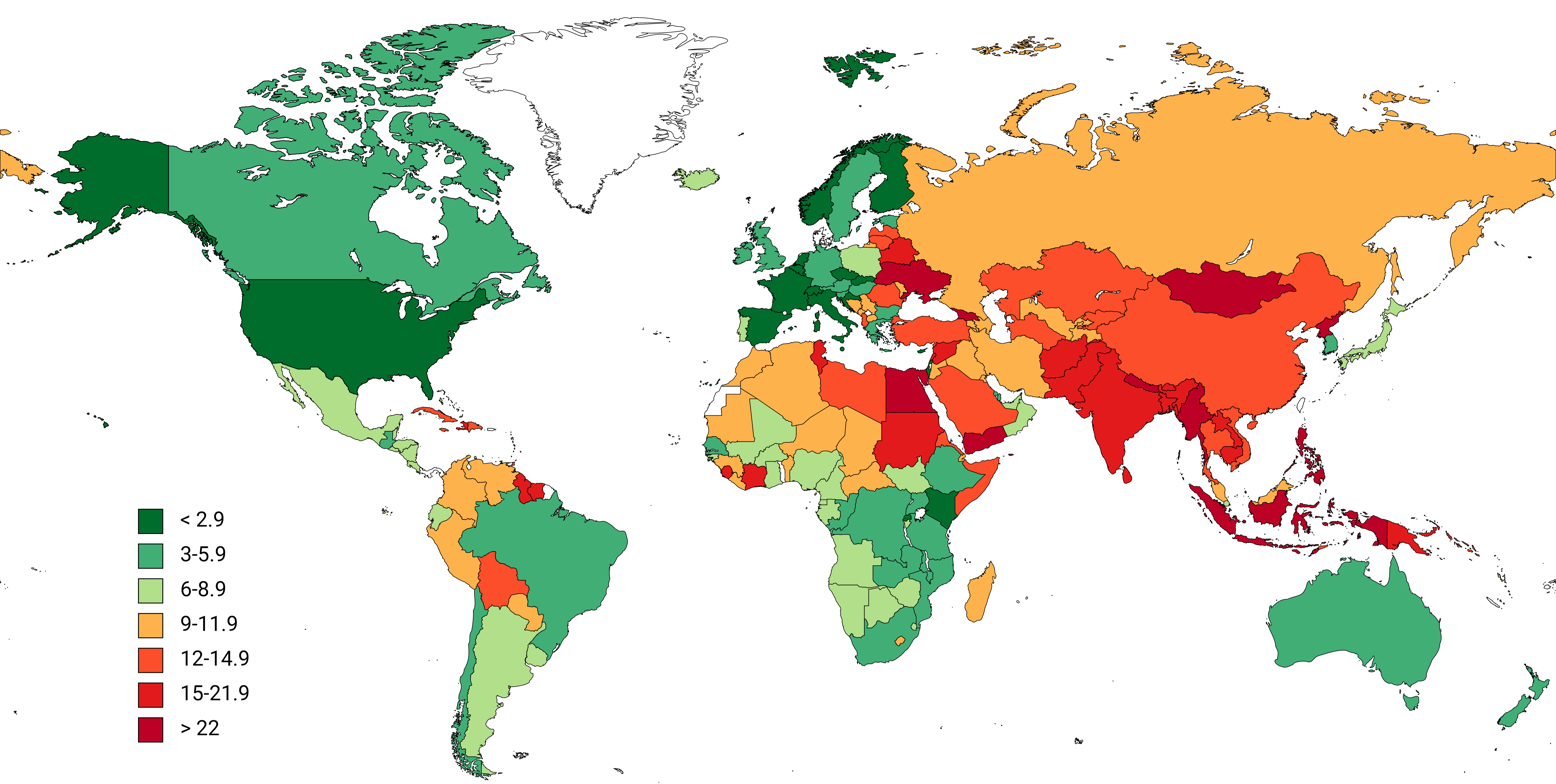
Deaths due to long working hours per 100,000 people; joint 2016 study by the World Health Organization and International Labour Organization

The labor movement of South Korea consists of a number of labor movements and organizations that advocate for the rights and well-being of workers. Organizations have emerged with differing political ideologies and methods of how to achieve their respective goals in relation to workers' rights. South Korean organized labor is also active in other movements, promoting solidarity among organizations. The movement originated in the 19th century, under Japanese rule, as a way to organize workers.

It developed with the growing working class. The movement employs a variety of methods to bargain, and a number of unions have been created to advocate for workers.

== Origins ==
The first labor union was established under colonial Japanese rule in 1910, and the Seongjin Stevedores Union consisted of 47 workers. Unions were limited in scope at this time due to their small size, and were limited to occupational- and regional-based unions. The labor movement had two differing ideologies: pro-Korean identity and pro-Japanese identity. Rather than spontaneous revolts, the labor movement organized regional strikes at this time.

== History ==
=== After 1945 ===
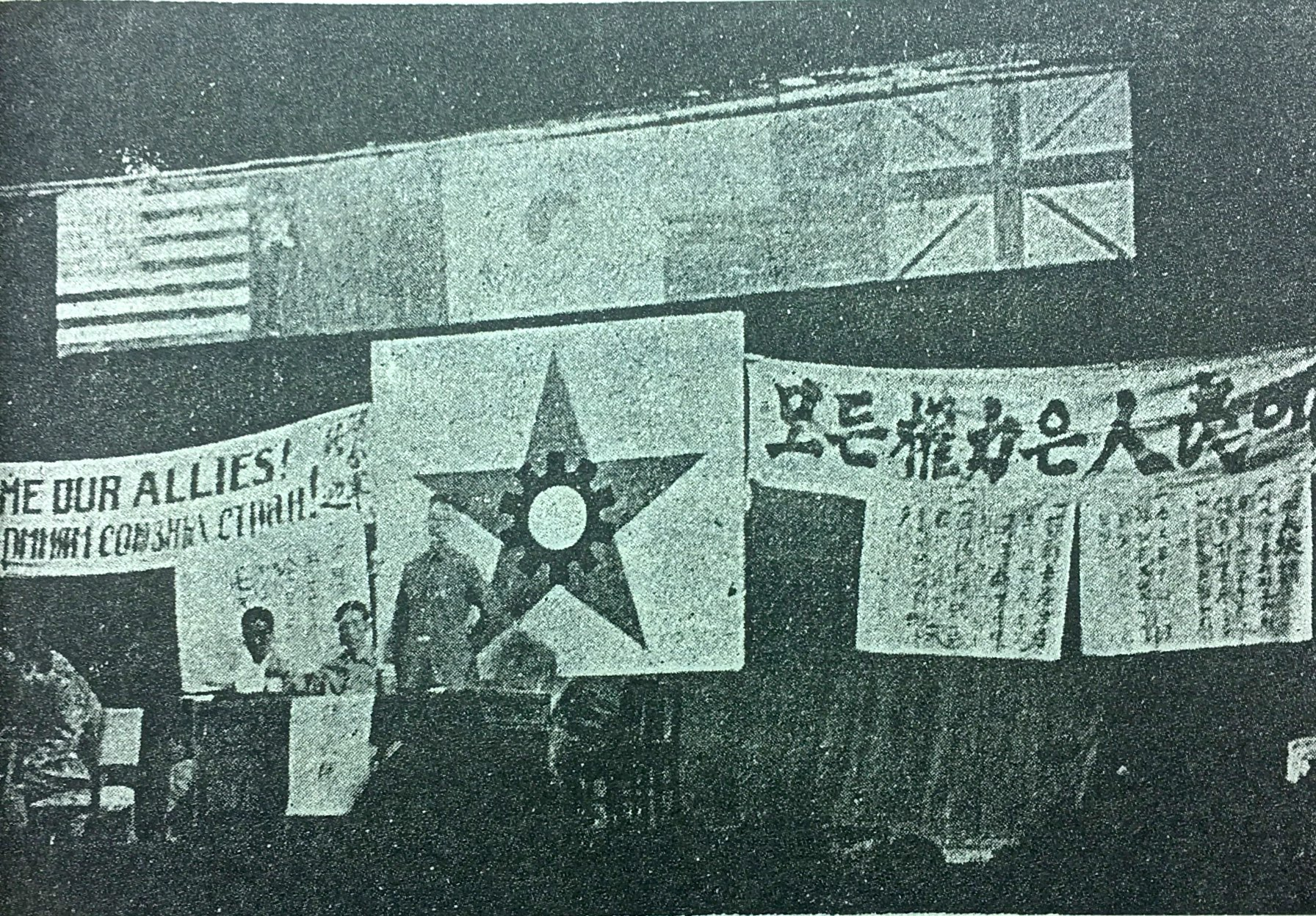
Inaugural meeting of the Council of Trade Unions

In November 1945, socialists formed the General Council of Korea Trade Unions (GCKTU). Initial membership was 180,000 workers, increasing to 553,408 within two months. The GCKTU held over 3,000 strikes between August 1945 and February 1948, resulting in the deaths of 25 people and the imprisonment of 11,000. Fallout from the strikes led to the creation of a labor department by the American military which restricted union political activity.

To protest the restriction, the GCKTU called for renewed strikes (known as the September National Strikes) but failed to achieve anything significant and was banned. In an effort to oppose the GCKTU, a right-wing trade union known as Daehan Dogrib Chockseong Nodong Chongyeonmyeng (the General Federation of Korean Trade Unions, GFKTU) was formed in March 1946. The GCKTU ban made the GFKTU the sole representative of Korean trade unions, and it was later named the Federation of Korean Trade Unions (FKTU).

=== Federation of Korean Trade Unions ===
The Federation of Korean Trade Unions (FKTU) was formed in March 1946 in an effort to oppose the left-leaning GCKTU. The FKTU had two goals: to support the conservative government, and to oppose left-leaning labor movements. The federation opposed many GCKTU strikes, attributing them as a means of gaining political power. When the GCKTU was banned, the FKTU was the sole trade union and represented South Korea at the December 1949 International Confederation of Free Trade Unions.

In 1952, President Syngman Rhee took control of the union and incorporated it into the Liberal Party. In 1953, the Labor Standards Act, the Labor Union Act and the Labor Disputes Adjustment Act were passed by the government. The Labor Standards Act guaranteed an eight-hour workday. In April 1960, Rhee was removed from his position by the student movement which led the FKTU to dissolve its ties to the Liberal Party. In April 1971, the FKTU established the Committee on Political Education (COPE) to educate members on political issues and help political campaigns that supported workers' rights.

=== Jeon Tae-il ===
Jeon Tae-il was an activist who formed the Fool's Organization to fight for better treatment for workers. The organization reported problems, such as illegal working conditions or other offenses that violated the Labor Standards Act, to government officials. Spurred by the ineffectiveness of the government to improve working conditions, Jeon committed suicide by lighting himself on fire in protest. His actions inspired others to do the same.

=== Gwangju Uprising ===
The May 1980 Gwangju Uprising was the first step towards democracy in South Korea. Although the movement was conceived by students, the working class eventually made up a bulk of the participants. The uprising led to the deaths of at least 164 people. Statistics vary due to alleged cover-ups, where bodies were burned or dumped into the ocean and unmarked graves.

On May 14, 1980, a student demonstration of over 70,000 people sought to express their grievances against the authoritarian government. On May 17, the government arrested the leaders of the demonstrations to stop the movement. The following day, paratroopers confronted the protesters and escalated the situation. A slaughter of citizens united "workers, farmers, students, and people from all walks of life" to oppose the government. On May 27, the uprising was suppressed.

=== June 1987 Struggle ===
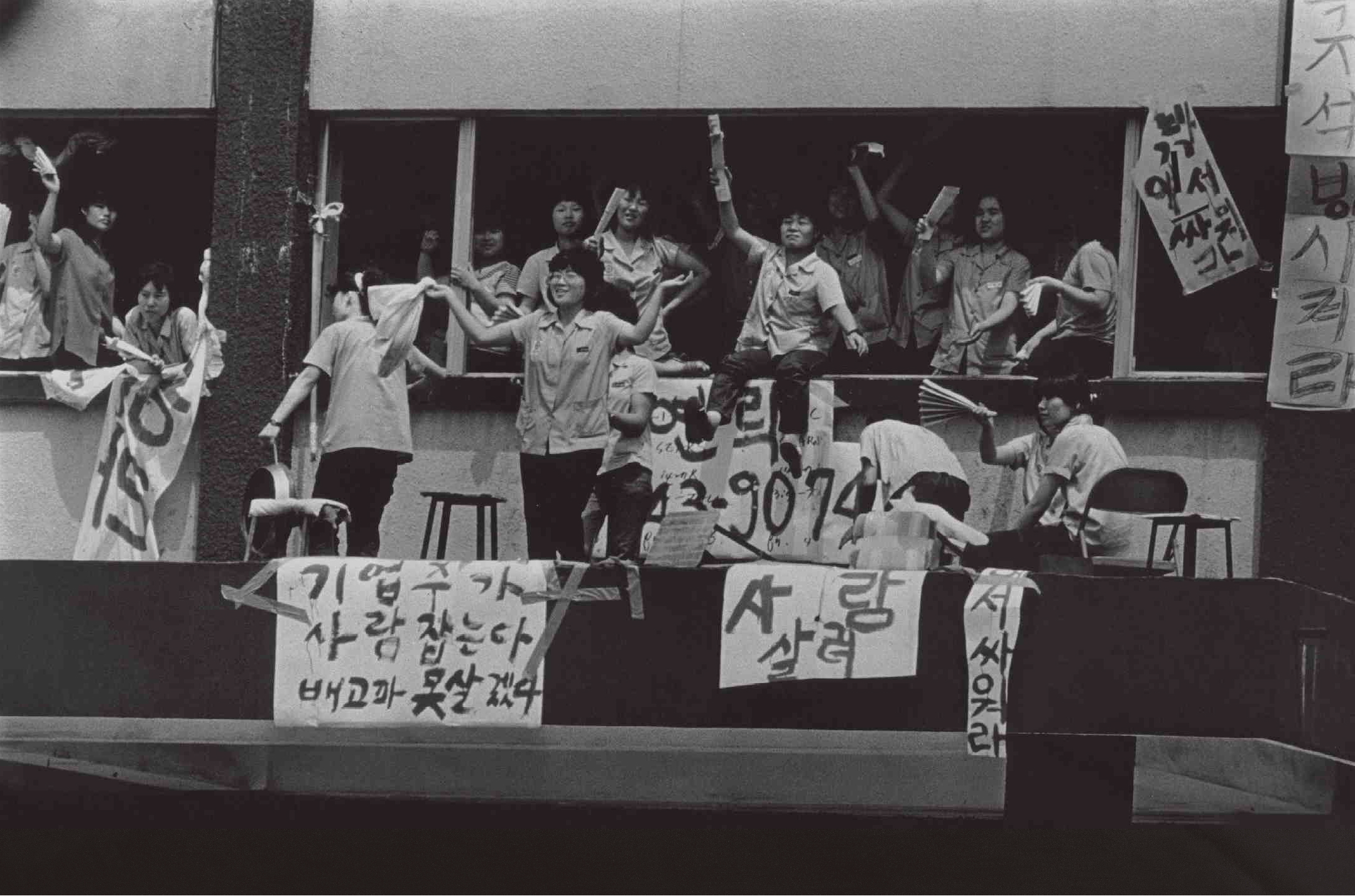
Protests at Daewoo Apparel at the Seoul Industrial Complex in Guro District, 1985

The 1987 June Democratic Struggle took place over 19 days, and a number of cities participated in protests for democracy. The Gwangju Uprising paved the way for student and worker solidarity, which were instrumental for a democratic transition. A large number of people were arrested during the struggle, most of whom were laborers. To avoid another uprising, the government allowed elections and democratic reforms.

=== Great Worker Struggle ===
During the July and August 1987 democratization of Korea, over three million workers inspired by the June Struggle led an uprising demanding better wages, improved working conditions, and autonomous trade unions. Autonomous trade unions were an important goal, since "no legal independent unions existed"; the FKTU was "loyal to the government".

=== Korean Confederation of Trade Unions ===
On November 13, 1994, the groundwork for a new union to oppose the FKTU was laid. Inspired by the Great Worker Struggle, union leaders adopted a militant strategy in bargaining. To be more effective, regional cooperation with other unions was key in creating a new union. The Council of National Democratic Unions was formed.

In 1995, the Korean Confederation of Trade Unions (KCTU) emerged from the council. The KCTU represented the automobile and shipbuilding industries, heavy industries, and public-transport and white-collar workers. The KCTU began its first strike in 1997 to protest the passage of bills limiting workers' rights, and later negotiated semi-legal status.

=== 1997 general strike ===
The National Assembly attempted to pass two laws in December 1996 that would limit workers' rights, making it easier to fire workers and allowing the use of strikebreakers. In response to this, workers responded en masse by walking off their jobs. By the third day, the general strike involved 350,000 workers and stopped most industrial production. FKTU leaders met with KCTU leaders on January 3, 1997, to create a united front. On January 15, the number of workers on strike peaked at one million. The following day, the government conceded and sent the bills back for revision. The laws were revised in March, and the KCTU attained semi-legal status.

== Methods ==
The South Korean labor movement has used a variety of methods to negotiate, which include strikes, protests, hunger protests, self-immolation, violence, kidnapping, and the occupation of buildings.

== See also ==
- Trade unions in South Korea
- Women in unions in South Korea
- Working hours in South Korea
