= Mandarina Duck =

Italien designer fashion brand

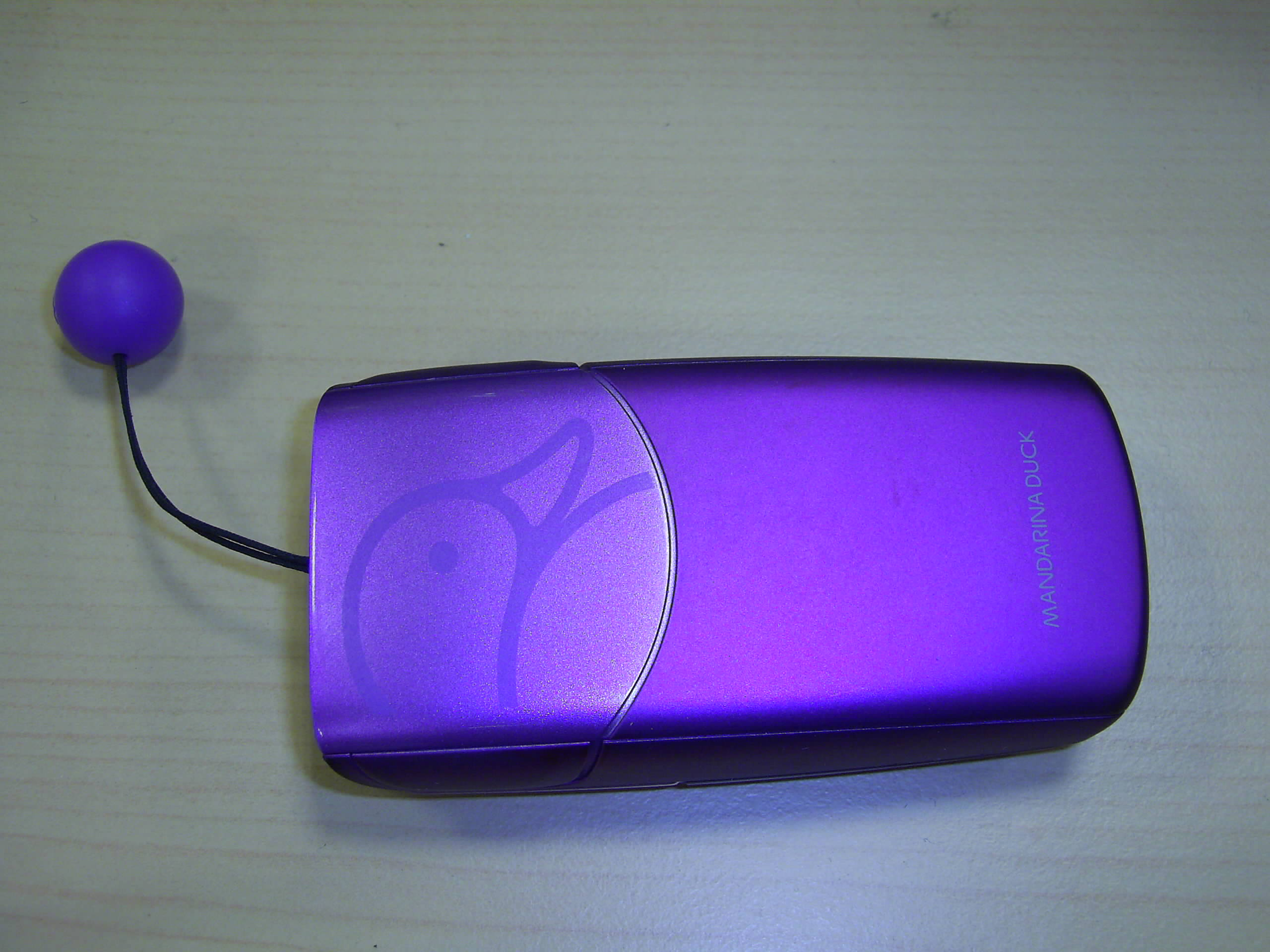
- Location: Bologna, Italy
- Opened: 1977
- Website: mandarinaduck.com

Mandarina Duck is an Italian fashion brand, most commonly associated with designer luggage and travel accessories but which has also released sunglasses, fragrances, watches, perfumes and, in 2007, a mobile phone. Mandarina Duck is owned by E-Land.

== History ==
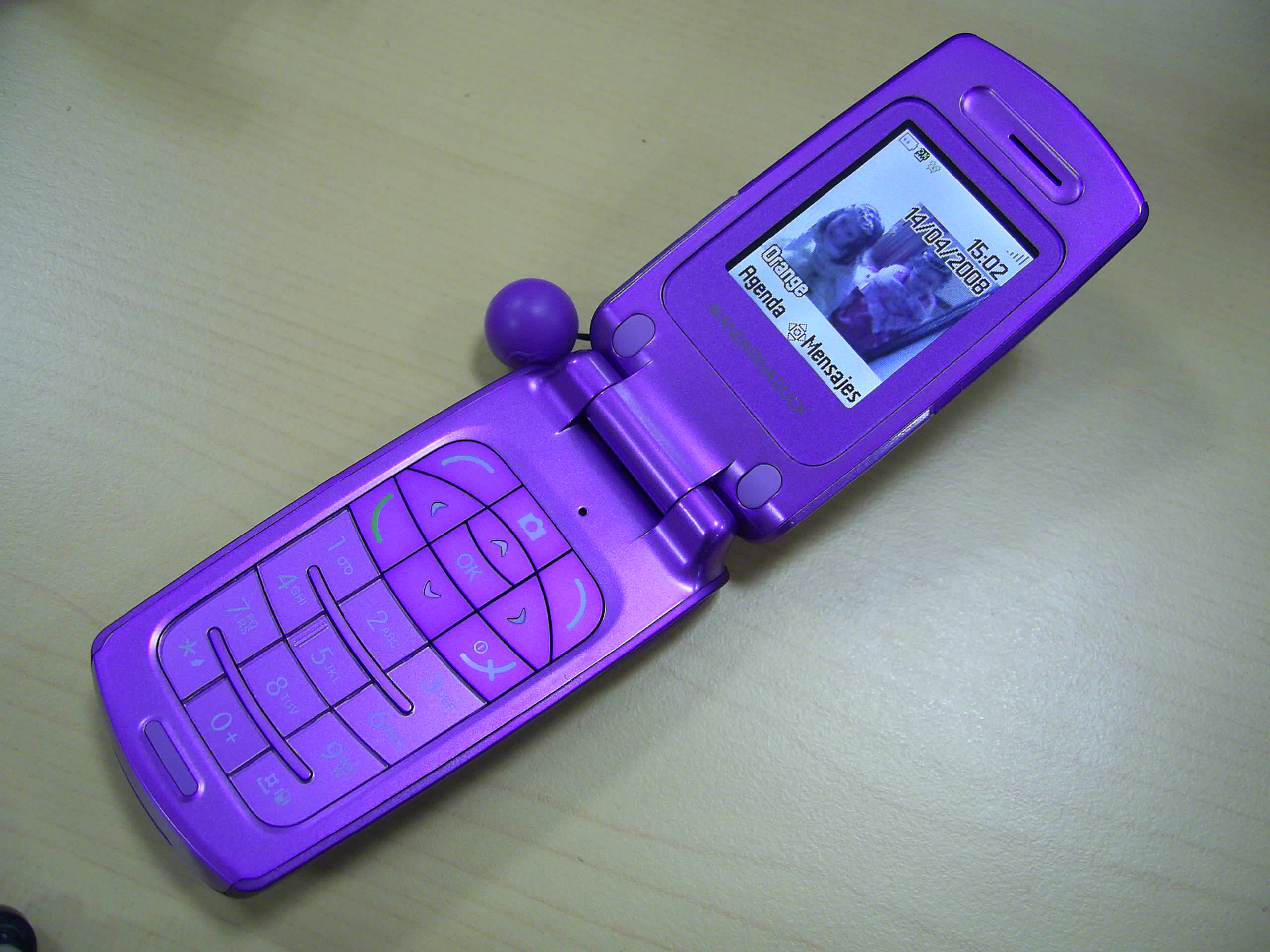
Alcatel Mandarina Duck PIC 0962

Mandarina Duck was founded in 1977 by Paolo Trento and Pietro Mannato. Its first collection was called Utility. By 1996, Mandarina Duck had 68 shops worldwide.

In 2004, Mandarina Duck launched a set of luggage designed to fit the Mini Hatch's size and design. In 2007, a limited edition of the Nissan Micra designed by Mandarina Duck was launched. In 2008, Italian leather goods retailer Antichi Pelletieri bought Mandarina Duck's parent company Finduck Group for £29.2 million. In 2009, Mandarina Duck launched its first mobile phone called Moon and built by phone manufacturer Alcatel.

In July 2011, E-Land, a large Korean retailer, purchased the debt-ridden Mandarina Duck.

In 2014, Virgin Australia chose Mandarina Duck amenity kit bags for its business class. In May 2017, Mandarina Duck launched a handbag made from recycled plastic bottles.

In 2019, Turkish Airlines collaborated with Mandarina Duck to provide economy class passengers with amenity kits on long-haul flights.

== Description ==
The company name and logo come from the Mandarin duck (Aix galericulata), a species that inhabits rivers and lakes in East Asia. They opened a flagship outlet in Malaysia in 2007.

The company headquarters are in Bologna, Italy, with branches in Paris, Barcelona, Düsseldorf, Berlin, Vienna and London, and outlets such as Banbridge Outlet in Northern Ireland. The CEO is Giovanni Bonatti since December 2015.
