= Trade unions in South Korea =

- National organization(s): KCTU, FKTU

Global Rights Index
- 5 No guarantee of rights

International Labour Organization
- South Korea is a member of the ILO

Convention ratification
- Freedom of Association: 20 April 2021
- Right to Organise: 20 April 2021

Trade unions in South Korea originated in the labor movements of the 1980s and 1990s, during the transition from the authoritarian regimes of Park Chung Hee and Chun Doo-hwan. These labor movements would lead to the formation of two national trade unions; the Federation of Korean Trade Unions (FKTU) and the Korean Confederation of Trade Unions (KCTU), which remain prominent in South Korea. In 2007, the FKTU had 1,153,863 members (41.1% of trade unionists in Korea), the KCTU had 1,134,056 members (40.4%), and 516,714 workers were members of independent trade unions affiliated to neither national centre. South Korea scored 5 on the Global Rights Index (GRI) by the International Trade Union Confederation (ITUC), which signifies "no guarantee of rights".

The Ministry of Employment and Labor announced on December 30, 2021, that as of 2020, 14.2% of workers were in trade unions in South Korea, a 1.7% increase from 12.5% in 2019. Korea's unionization rate peaked in 1989 at 19.8% and fell to 10% 2004.

== History ==
The economy of South Korea was one of stagnation in the first half of the 20th century, as a result of Japanese colonization of Korea, the division of the Korean peninsula, and the devastation of the Korean War. This began to change under the Military dictatorship of Park Chung Hee, whose regime created intense initiatives to increase South Korea's economic export through rapid industrialization in the period between 1963 and into his successor's own military regime in the 1980s. This rapid industrialization under authoritarian governments led to instances of collective uprising of communities sparked by violent government reactions to labor protests, such as the Busan–Masan Uprising in 1979 and the Gwangju Uprising in 1980.

In 1987, Korea began to transition to a democratic system of governance and labor unions began to form as Korean workers pushed for more rights and protections from their elected leaders. Ultimately, two centralized trade unions would dominate worker relations in South Korea; the Korean Confederation of Trade Unions (KCTU) and the Federation of Korean Trade Unions (FKTU). While the trade unions were initially restricted in the collective action and organizing they were legally allowed to carry out by the opposition to change from the first elected government and powerful business interests, KCTU and FKTU organised protests in January 1997 pushed the National Assembly to finally enact legislation which provided greater powers and protections to workers and trade unions.

However, despite the advances gained in early 1997, trade unions would suffer a significant loss of membership and influence as a result of the 1997 Asian financial crisis. While there were some gains made by trade unions in terms of membership between 1998-1999, by the beginning of 2000, collective trade unions would enter a state of decline which persisted into the 2020s. This decline in trade union membership has been largely associated with an increase in prominence of individual company-based 'unions' which tend to work in favor of company interests (especially when affiliated with prominent Chaebols) and a concurrent rise in "irregular workers." These irregular workers are employed in part-time, short-term contract, or contingent work, and do not meet the legal requirements to enter into trade union membership, leaving them particularly vulnerable to workplace abuse and frequent periods of unemployment.

== See also ==
- South Korean Labor Movement
- Women in unions in South Korea
- Minjung Movement
- Working hours in South Korea
