= South Korean KTX Train Attendant Union Strike =

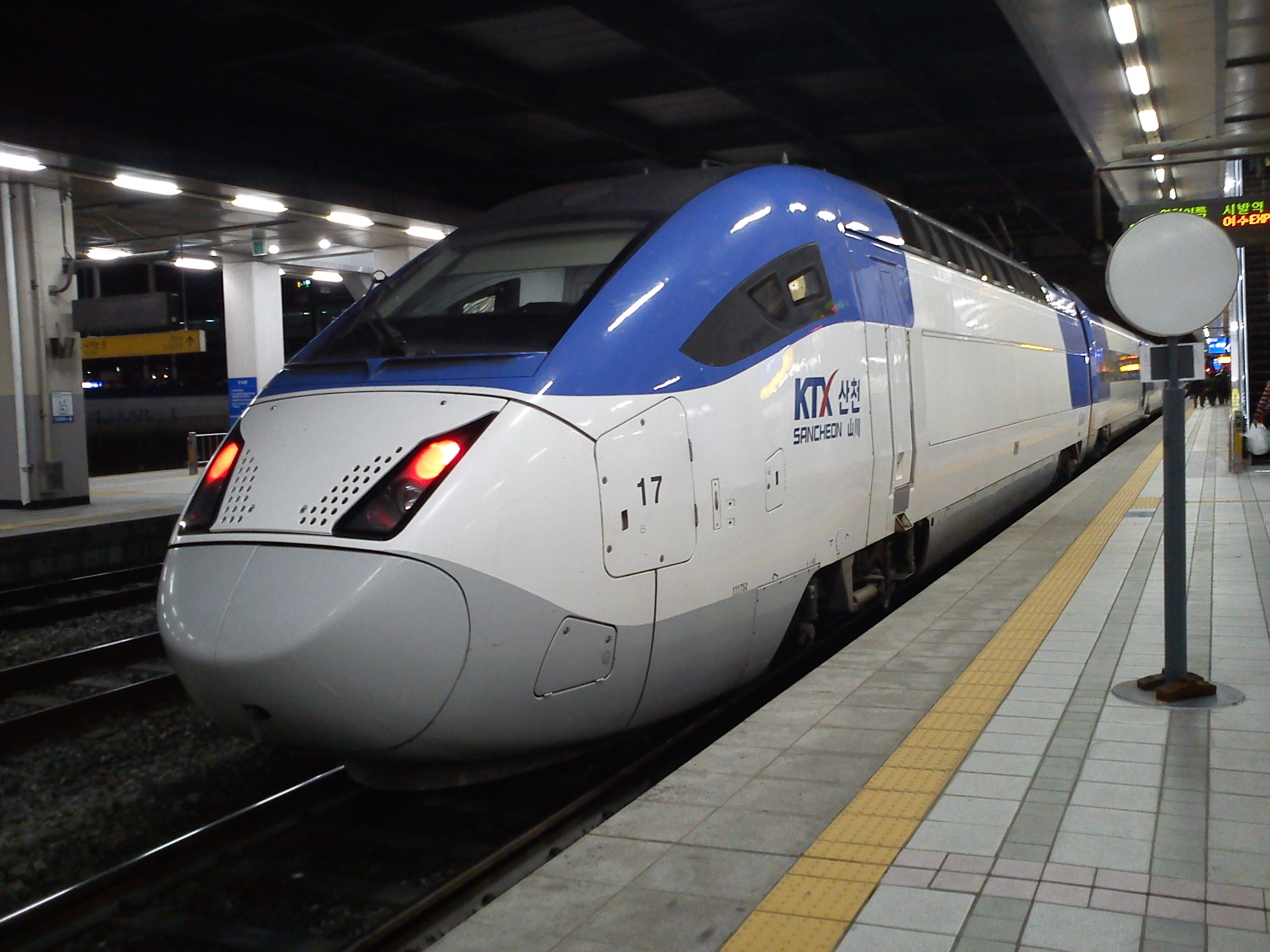
South Korean KTX bullet train

The South Korean KTX Train Attendant Union Strike was a strike conducted by the KTX (Korea Train Express) female train attendants that began on March 1, 2006 in order to protest against the hiring practices of irregular workers. This was the beginning of the longest struggle in South Korea thus far, lasting over 1,000 days.

Two years prior, these women had been hired by the Korea Railroad Corporation (KORAIL) as irregular workers with the promise of becoming regular workers with the appropriate benefits and compensation after one year of employment. However, in 2006, because of a change in management, KORAIL forced the workers to accept reduced benefits and wages as well as coercing the workers to perform additional work outside of their traditional duties. In addition to these unfair labor practices, KTX train attendants also reported experiences of sexual harassment in the workplace. All of these issues culminated into approximately 400 female workers joining 17,000 male workers from the Korean Railway Workers' Union (KRWU) on March 1 in the 2006 strike against KORAIL. The majority of the men from the KRWU stopped protesting after 4 days; however, the women continued their strike. Over the course of 12 years, many workers dropped out of the strike; however, 180 continued until 2018 when the Railway Workers' Union and KORAIL came to an agreement in which these 180 of the crew members were reinstated.

== Background ==
KORAIL hired these women as irregular workers through the company, Hongikhoe, with the promise that they would become regular workers after one year of employment. However, KORAIL changed its management of the KTX train attendants to KTX Tourism Leisure and forced the workers to accept the reduced benefits and wages with the threat of difficulties during future rehiring processes. In addition to reports of sexual harassment, the workers were also forced into additional work outside their traditional duties, such as greeting customers while wearing hanbok (traditional Korean dresses).

=== Irregular employment ===
The KTX train attendants fall into the category of "atypical or non-standard employment arrangement" of irregular employment because they were hired full-time employment responsibilities without the benefits, compensation, or protection that should be guaranteed with such duties. Irregular employment entails lower wages, less benefits, and increased job insecurity, and recently, has seen an increase especially for women. Even though workers may be required to uphold the responsibilities of a regular employee, they are reclassified legally, so that management does not have the legal obligation to follow labor laws. In addition to experiencing sexual harassment and reduced compensation and benefits, the female KTX workers were also officially employed in subordinate positions compared to men, even though they had similar responsibilities.

=== Union ===
As a result of deregulations and privatization of telecommunication and railway companies in South Korea, companies had more freedom while labor unions had more difficulty in maintaining balanced power between employers and employees. Even though all unions were affected by the privatization of businesses, unions differ in their responses to defend workers in that some chose to organize and respond with protests or similar militancy while others cooperated with the government. KRWU, the union for the KTX workers, was one of the unions that had an increase in political access during the privatization process of the railway company and therefore was able to gain support and alliances. By the end of 2005, a majority of the female workers had joined the KRWU.

The strike that began in 2006 is not singular in regards to protest by irregularly employed women. One of the first struggles occurred in 1998 against their own union, the Hyundai Motors Union. At that time, the Korean Women Workers Associations United (KWWAU) was limited in its power as it was an NGO and not a union. In August 1999, the KWWAU established the national Korean Women's Trade Union (KWTU), which allows any woman to join as a member of the union, even irregularly employed women workers.

== Strike ==
On March 1, 2006, 400 female workers joined 17,000 male workers in a strike against KORAIL. After 4 days, the male protestors returned to work; however, the remaining KTX train attendants continued for the next 1000 days using varying forms of protest, such as head shaving, fasting, sit-in on iron towers, iron chaining. A particularly shocking protest took the form of KTX train attendants in their uniforms with white masks painted with large black "X's" while their bodies were shackled with chains.

One month after the strike began, KORAIL Tourism Leisure sent text messages to the female workers on strike that their contracts were canceled, but that they would be rehired if the strike ended. The women did not stop the strike. KORAIL fired 280 crew members who refused to rejoin the company.

In May 2006, approximately 80 female workers were arrested for occupying the KORAIL office in Seoul.

In January 2007, KTX union leaders organized a sit-in at the Seoul central station, which continued on and off until July 2018. In August 2008, 3 unionists held a sit-in that lasted 20 days at the top of a lighting tower.

In December 2008, 34 workers still on strike filed a lawsuit to reaffirm that they were employees of the Urban Railway Public Corporation. They won both trials of 2009 and 2011. KORAIL paid the workers four years worth of pay back but did not rehire them; it also brought the case to the Supreme Court.

In 2012, around 100 laid-off workers also filed a lawsuit and were able to win at the first trial but not the second one. On February 26, 2015, the Supreme Court overturned the verdict of the first and second trials, stating that the KTX female workers were not employees of the Urban Railway Public Corporation. They deemed that the female crew workers were not involved with "safety work." Following the Supreme Court's verdict, KORAIL won an injunction to collect "an average of KRW 86.4 million ($76,000)" that it had previously paid to each laid off crew member. In March 2016, a 36 year old former attendant committed suicide, leaving a note to her three-year-old daughter "I am sorry, my baby. All I can leave with you is debt."

On July 20, 2018, the Railway Workers' Union and KORAIL came to an agreement to resolve the issue. The KTX members who were laid off in 2006 would be reinstated and have employment status. This agreement excluded those who were previously employed in KORAIL's headquarters or subsidiary companies.

=== Support ===
In August 2007, the Korean Professors Association (gyosu moim) issued a petition that garnered international solidarity against KORAIL. The petition had signatures from approximately 200 professors in 18 different countries. On December 3, 2007, it was delivered to the CEO of KORAIL. Later that month, the CEO of KORAIL, Mr. Chul Lee sent a letter replying to the 200 professors, stating that the petition consisted of "one-sided assertions."
