= YH incident =

1979 labor conflict in South Korea

- Part of the Minjung movement
- Date: 9–11 August 1979
- Location: Seoul, South Korea
- Caused by: Unilateral shutdown of YH Trading
- Methods: Strike, occupation
- Result: Action violently suppressed by police; Kim Young-sam and opposition lawmakers expelled from National Assembly; Popular uprising triggered in Busan and Masan

Parties
YH Trading Company garment workers Supported by: New Democratic Party; Urban Industrial Mission	YH Trading Company; Government of South Korea; National Security Headquarters; Supported by: Democratic Republican Party

Number
187 workers	1,000 riot police

Casualties
- Deaths: 1 worker (Kim Gyeong-suk)
- Injuries: 52 (10 workers, 30 members of the NDP, 12 reporters)
- Arrested: 7

In August 1979, female garment workers of the YH Trading Company in Seoul, South Korea held a sit-in protest at headquarters of the opposition New Democratic Party in response to the company's unilateral shutdown and their impending redundancy. Workers entered the NDP building on 9 August, receiving the support of party leader Kim Young-sam. On 11 August, riot police entered the building and violently evicted the protesters, injuring dozens – including protesters, journalists and politicians – and killing one 21 year-old YH worker, Kim Gyeong-suk. Kim Young-sam was subsequently expelled from the National Assembly, leading to a political crisis that sparked the Busan–Masan Uprising in October 1979. Via the uprising, the strike has been cited as triggering a chain of events that led to the assassination of long-time military dictator Park Chung Hee by KCIA director Kim Jae-gyu on 26 October.

== Background ==
=== Park Chung-hee presidency ===
Since 1961, South Korea had been under the de facto rule of Park Chung Hee. He first took power following a military coup on 16 May 1961 against the interim government of Yun Po-sun and was subsequently elected president in 1963. During his rule, South Korea experienced rapid economic growth and industrialization, with the country's GNP per capita seeing an estimated increase from US$82 in 1962 to over $1000 by the end of his presidency. Despite high levels of economic growth, workers endured low wages and poor working conditions, highlighted in 1970 after a textile worker and labor organizer Jeon Tae-il set himself on fire. After decades of suppression since the partition of Korea, a labor movement grew in prominence during the 1970s, becoming a significant component of the opposition movement to Park's rule.

After a narrow-than-expected victory in the 1971 presidential election, Park seized power in a self-coup in October 1972, introducing the Yushin Constitution which abolished direct presidential elections. In the following years, anti-Yushin protest movements grew in intensity in spite of political repression. In 1974, the government held a total of 1024 people under fabricated charges of forming a leftist group called the People's Revolutionary Party, sentencing seven to death. In 1978–79, South Korea's developmentalist economic model faultered, producing high inflation, further exacerbated by the 1979 oil crisis. In the year preceding August 1979, average household living costs rose by 26.3%, whereas wages only increased by 12%.

=== YH Trading Company ===
The YH Trading Company, founded in 1966 by Korean-American businessman Jang Yong-ho, was a firm specializing in wig manufacturing. It was the 15th largest exporter of South Korea in the 1970s. The company management was alleged to have engaged in corrupt practices, including siphoning company resources, resulting in a surge of corporate debt in the late 1970s. Workers were employed on low wages, and the company regularly engaged in unlawful firing of employees. In response, company workers founded a labor union in May 1975. On March 30, 1979, the company announced it was shutting down at the end of April, partly blaming union demands. Meanwhile, Jang suddenly relocated to the United States.

== Events ==
After the company announced its closure, the unionized workers attempted to send requests for cooperation from state institutions and to hold strikes, but to no response. On August 6, the company issued a notice of closure and cut off water and electricity supplies to worker dormitories on August 8. Following this, union members sought support from church and human rights organizations such as the National Council of Churches in Korea and the Urban Industrial Mission, and decided to go to the headquarters of the New Democratic Party (NDP) to hold a sit-in as a venue to seek support political support for their cause. Other proposals had included church buildings such as Myeongdong Cathedral.

The sit-in at the party headquarters by 187 workers occurred the following day, with the dormitories being closed on the same day. Party chair Kim Young-sam declared his willingness to help, and the NDP formed an internal committee regarding labor issues, requesting a meeting with the Welfare and Social Affairs Committee of the National Assembly. However, this was blocked by the ruling Democratic Republican Party, and the government requested the protestors to disperse from the premises. On the afternoon of August 10, the president of YH Trading visited the party headquarters and expressed willingness to place the company under bank receivership and withdraw the decision to shut it down, with the union responding that they would agree to end the action under these conditions, however no further progress was made towards a resolution.

Despite a request from Kim for police to withdraw from the headquarters, one thousand riot police entered the building at around 2 am on August 11. They indiscriminately assaulted NDP Assembly members (including Kim), party members, YH workers and journalists, resulting the injury of 10 workers, 30 members of the NDP, and 12 reporters. 7 people including leaders of both the union and church organizations who supported them were arrested under the National Security Act. Journalists reported seeing blood stains on walls inside the building, and four National Assembly members were among those hospitalized. One YH worker, Kim Kyung-sook, who had served on the union's executive committee, was killed in the raid. Her death was initially claimed by police as a suicide, but in 2008, the Truth and Reconciliation Commission found that she had incurred injuries to the back of her head from a metal pipe and a sharp object.

== Aftermath and legacy ==
The events further worsened already deteriorating relations between the NDP and the Park regime, with the government having already arrested party officials and confiscated copies of the NDP's newspaper. In a statement on 13 August, the US government denounced the repression as "excessive and brutal". On 8 September, a legal injunction was issued by the government which suspended Kim's leadership of the NDP, and on 4 October, he was expelled from the National Assembly for allegedly "deviating from his duties as a lawmaker and engaging in anti-state speech and actions". On 13 October, all 66 NDP parliamentarians announced their resignation in protest at the decision. They were joined by the three representatives of the Democratic Unification Party and by Sohn Joo Hang, an assemblyman who had been imprisoned after calling Park a dictator.

The removal of Kim and repression of the NDP sparked immediate backlash and galvanized the opposition movement. On 10 September, Kim announced his support for a movement to "overthrow the Park regime". On 15 September, he called on the Carter administration in the United States to end support for the Park government in an interview with the New York Times. Following the removal of all parliamentary opposition, students at Pusan National University distributed a document declaring a "struggle for democracy" on 15 October. The following day, students initiated large-scale protests, marking the start of the Busan–Masan Uprising, which quickly drew participation from the broader public. Major unrest persisted until the 20 October, only ending following the imposition of martial law in Busan, Masan and Changwon.

On the evening of 26 October, Park held a dinner with, among others, Korean Central Intelligence Agency (KCIA) director Kim Jae-gyu and Presidential Security Service chief Cha Ji-cheol, in which the topic of the uprising was discussed. The two had developed a hostile relationship, with the President being particularly close to the latter, who was growing in political power. Following an argument, in which Kim Jae-gyu alleged Cha expressed support for the killing of protestors, Kim left and assembled his subordinates, before later re-entering and shooting Park, Cha, and three other bodyguards dead. Kim was arrested four hours later, and executed on 24 May 1980. The assassination led to the dissolution of the Fourth Republic of Korea and the seizure of power by Chun Doo-hwan.

Following the end of military rule in 1987, Kim Young-sam was elected President of South Korea in December 1992, representing the Democratic Liberal Party. He served from 1993 to 1998. One of the YH union leaders, Choi Soon-young, later served as a member of the National Assembly for the Democratic Labor Party between 2004 and 2008.

== In media ==
The incident is depicted in the 1995 South Korean TV series Sandglass.

== See also ==
- Seoul Spring
- Women in unions in South Korea
- Labor movement of South Korea
