= 1996–1997 strikes in South Korea =

Series of strikes in South Korea

In December 1996 and January 1997, South Korea experienced the largest organized strike in its history, when workers in the automotive and shipbuilding industries refused to work in protest against a law which was to make firing employees easier for employers and curtail labor organizing rights.

Among other things, the Korean government intended to postpone the legal recognition of the recently established Korean Confederation of Trade Unions until the year 2000. The officially recognized Federation of Korean Trade Unions then called upon its 1.2 million members to go on strike on December 26. This was its first call for a general strike since the union's founding in 1962.

After a single day, the strikes started spreading to other sectors including hospitals. On December 28, South Korean riot police used methods such as tear gas against the strikers in order to dispel crowds. Strikers responded by throwing bricks.

In late January 1997, the strike ended after the labor laws were amended by the government.

== Overview ==
In December 1996 and January 1997, there was a massive four-week nationwide strike in South Korea in protest against newly passed labor laws which gave employers more power to lay off employees, made it easier to hire temporary/strike replacing workers and put off allowing multiple unions to be formed at a given enterprise. This resulted in the mobilization of three million workers, which shut down auto/ship production, disrupted hospitals, subways and television. The two main unions involved were the Federation of Korean Trade Unions (FKTU) working with the Korean Confederation of Trade Unions (FCTU). This strike was notable due to its consistently high levels of worker participation and high level of public support. Two months after the end of the strike, the government passed very similar laws with only small concessions, making the strikes enormously successful in mobilization but only marginally successful in terms of actual results.

== Background ==
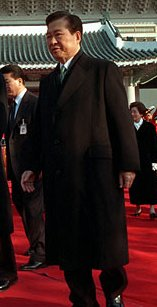
Kim Dae-jung in 2002

From 1985 to 1996, South Korea experienced a series of strikes that resulted in a clash of old laws and governmental frameworks that were incompatible with modern working practices. South Korea was able to endure these strikes and the lost revenue associated with them because of the "Three Lows": low interest rates, the lower value of the dollar against the yen and low oil prices. After these lows dissipated, South Korea felt that it could no longer afford continued labor unrest. Many companies attempted to institute practices that would allow for cost cutting, such as reliance on contract workers and part-time workers, in addition to allowing for voluntary retirement and adopting a no work no pay policy. These moves were actively opposed by labor groups and the need for labor reform became clear. This belief also led to South Korea's ruling New Korea Party (NKP) creating the Labor-Management Relations Reform Committee (LMRRC) on May 9. This consisted of members of various labor interest groups, university professors and lawmakers. Its 30 members held several public hearings on the creation on new labor policies and created the New Labor Law. This new labor law would make it easier and legal for companies to lay off workers, increase the legal work-week by 12 hours and allow companies to modify working hours, as well as make the use of scab labor during strikes legal and outlaw strike-pay.

The South Korean government said changes were necessary to make South Korea "more competitive with other developing economies" that were emerging as competitors to Korea. The committees that had been created were unsuccessful in creating a new labor bill after six months of hearings, so the NKP decided to create a new secret committee to create the bill on December 3. Then on December 26 in the wee hours of the morning four busses filled with NKP members arrived at the capital and in the course of twenty minutes eleven bills were passed. This action not only angered those outside the governmental walls, but also the LMRRC and those in other political parties who felt cheated. None of the other parties were aware of this vote and the outrage that resulted from these dishonest political maneuvers were major contributors to the strikes and labor disturbances that followed hours later.

== Involved unions ==
The two main unions involved in the 1996–1997 strikes were the FKTU partnered with the KCTU. The Federation of Korean Trade Unions was formed in 1960 following the April Revolution on the basis of the General Federation of Korean Trade Unions. The GFKTU was preceded by the General Council of Korean Unions, which was banned in 1947. Until the Korean Confederation of Trade Unions was recognized by the government in November 1999, the FKTU remained the sole legal association of trade unions in South Korea.

In 1990, workers and trade unionists illegally created the Korean Trade Union Congress. By the end of the year, they had 600 affiliated trade unions and 190,000 members. In 1995 the KTUC merged with other unrecognized trade unions and formed the Korean Confederation of Trade Unions. By 1997, the KCTU had grown to include 907 trade unions and 400,000 members. They received deferred legal recognition in 1996 and finally achieved full legal status in 1999. The two unions competed with each other for members and many trade unions formerly affiliated with the FKTU defected to the KCTU. The difference in origins between the FKTU and the KCTU are reflected in their different political strategies. The FKTU advocated for "constructive engagement with employers at enterprise and industry levels" and generally discouraged industrial action. The KCTU took the opposite stance, arguing that their goals could only be met by direct action.

== Strike ==
The strike was planned to begin on Friday, January 13 with a four-hour walkout in the heavy industrial export industries, including 34,000 workers at Hyundai Motor Co., 18,000 workers at Kia, 21,000 workers at the Hyundai Heavy Industries Shipyard. It would also include transit workers who operate the subway in Seoul, workers at the 10 major hospitals in Seoul, and tens of thousands of others. The initial demand was for a repeal of the new labor law, but as the strike went on, demands for the Kim Young Sam government to resign were added. The initial turnout was surprising because the labor movement in Korea had experienced what was called a "double failure" in the 90s, when it failed to gain serious political power and also failed to improve its organizational efficiency. Despite this, the unions involved were able to effectively bring South Korea's economy to a halt on only a few hours' notice.

The government declared all strike action illegal and coordinated with business leaders to attempt to break the strike by using replacement workers and threats of reprisal. On January 6, the government threatened to arrest at least 20 union officials. On January 16, riot police fired tear gas at thousands of workers marching toward Myongdong Cathedral. As a result, Kwon Young Kil, the strike's leader, announced on January 18 that the KCTU would strike only on Wednesdays until February 18, when they would resume all-out strikes if the government didn't cancel the law. They would also hold mass protests every Saturday. Later that day, police tangled with thousands of workers and student supporters trying to reach union leaders. On January 20, the president agreed to meet opposition leaders to try to resolve unrest as tens of thousands of union members returned to work. Hundreds of students battled police with firebombs, rocks and tear gas after a union leader urged an end to violence. Actions undertaken by President Kim and his government eventually proved to undermine him, as it turned both international and domestic favor against him. He and the NKP both suffered major dips in approval ratings as a result of these actions. The government threatened union leaders with the National Security Law – if they were found guilty of working with the socialist North, they would be subject to heavy penalties with very little proof of their guilt. These accusations became a major negotiating point as it caused distrust between any of these leaders and the government, which made any kind of negotiating difficult.

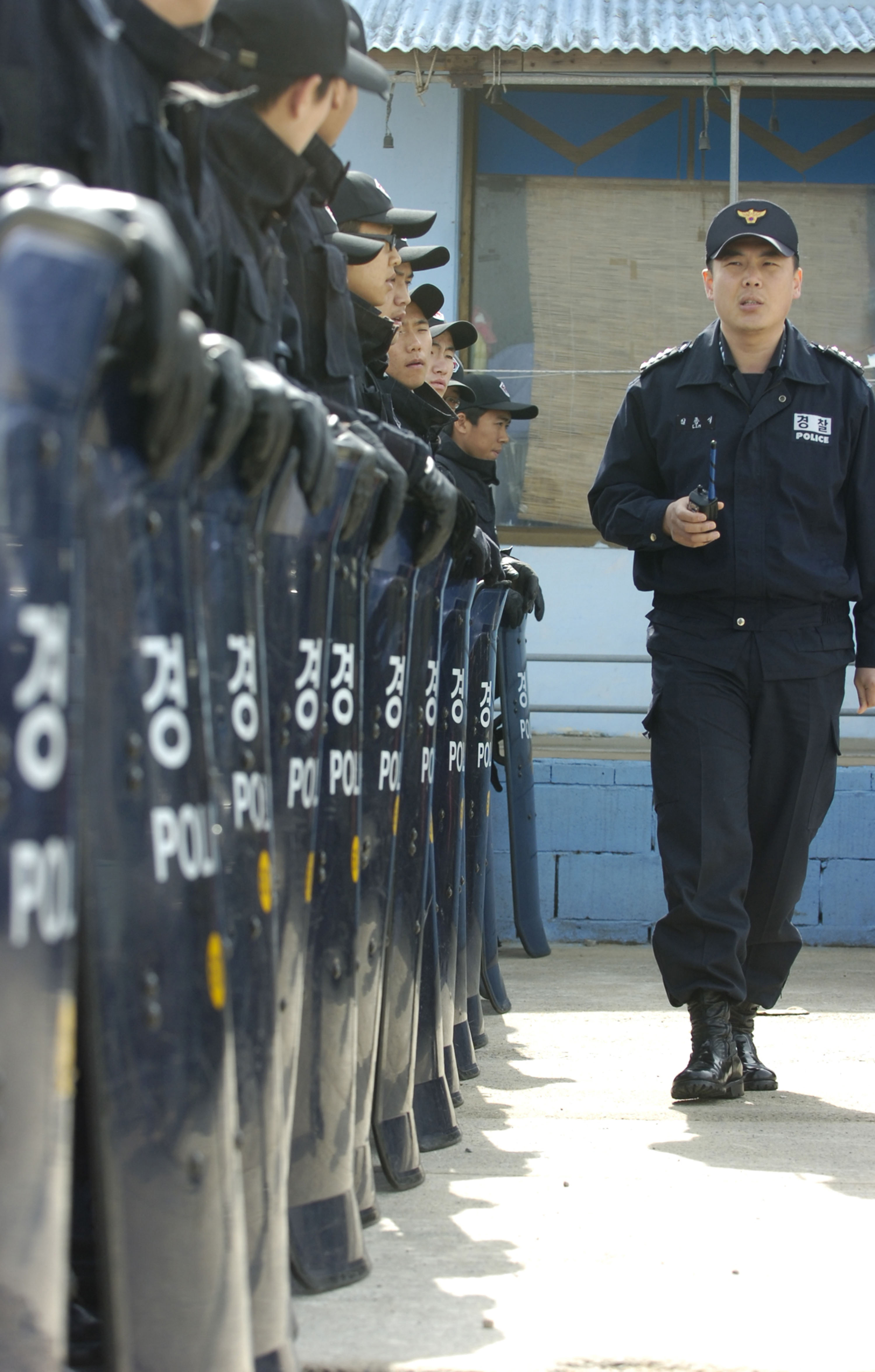
South Korean police

The turnout for the strikes was very successful. 610,000 workers struck in the largest walkout in the country's history. The FKTU announced on January 14 that 700,000 of its 1.2 million members would be striking that day. The government defended the proposed laws as necessary to boost South Korea's worsening ability to compete internationally and to combat slackening exports, a rising trade deficit, and declining growth.

In the first three weeks of the strikes, 200,000 workers in 176 firms cost the economy an estimated $2.3 billion, primarily in the auto, machinery, and shipbuilding industries, according to the government. Due to the increased international and domestic pressure, President Kim suffered a major dip in approval ratings down to 13.9% from the already low 27.4% it had been only two months previously. In addition, the New Korea Party also suffered a dip in support from 27% to 7%. This led President Kim to invite religious and civic leaders to the capital on January 21 on the grounds that he was willing to change the law. As a gesture of goodwill, the KCTU reduced the strikes to once a week on Wednesdays. Then on January 28, the KCTU suddenly canceled all protests, stating that they would return to striking if amendments were not made to the labor bill.

A poll by a Korean newspaper showed that 75% of salaried workers supported the two-day general strike, and 34% had switched their support to the workers' side to protest Kim's tactics. The FKTU, which usually collaborated with the government, joined some of the strike actions due to widespread public support. Students backed the workers, as did farmers, who reportedly delivered eggs to the protestors to throw at New Party offices. Many of the world's major labor federations, including the AFL-CIO in the United States, supported the strikers. The Australian Council of Trade Unions called on their government to publicly support the strikers. North Korean students and workers demonstrated solidarity with the striking workers.

Unfortunately for the movement, on January 24, Hanbo Steel, the second largest steel company in Korea declared bankruptcy, and with it there came to surface a host of government scandals, including one surrounding Hanbo. This diverted the media's focus from the strike. Compounding the problem, many workers and unions did not want to go back on strike because they had already suffered lost wages and could not afford to continue. The KCTU and the FKTU had also run out of money by this point and did not have the necessary finances to continue the strikes.

On February 12 the leaders of the two camps decided to meet in order to hash out a compromise. They met on the 17th, but the proposals and recommendations were not solidified until the 24th. As negotiations continued, the KCTU staged several strikes and on the 28th and threatened more strikes if the government did not allow more concessions. On March 10 the finalized bill was agreed upon. It was not much different from the original, but a few concessions were made. The general consensus at the time was that Unions did not reach their original goal and that the changes were mostly insignificant. The "no work, no pay" principle was allowed to continue, schoolteachers and public servants were still denied full union benefits and employers were permitted to stop paying union leaders. However, the implementation of flexible layoff program was delayed for two years.

This was the first successful general strike since the Korean War, and was in the interests of white collar workers as well as blue collar. Due to both the diversity of the interest and the massive turnout, it showed the unity of the nation.

== Impact ==
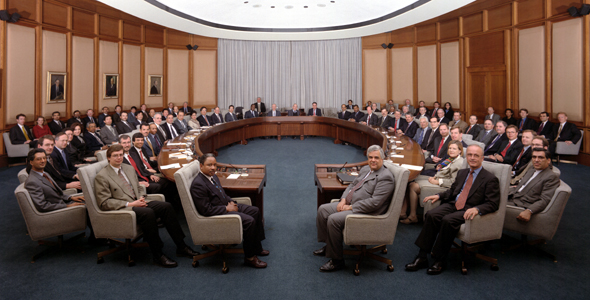
Board of Governors, International Monetary Fund

Workers in manufacturing still had a lifetime guarantee to their job in that layoffs were illegal, which was completely unheard of in the western world. In addition manufacturing workers in South Korea were among the best paid in Asia. This only lasted until December 2, 1997, when the South Korean government was forced to ask the International Monetary Fund for $57 billion due to a series of foreign exchange and financial crises. This forced South Korea to adopt more western labor policies in order to remain competitive with foreign companies and because of an International Monetary Fund–led structural adjustment plan.
