= Korean Railway Workers' Union =

- Founded: February 2001
- Headquarters: Seoul, South Korea
- Location: South Korea
- Key people: Kim Myeong-hwan, president
- Affiliations: ITF
- Website: krwu.nodong.net

Korean name
- Hangul: 전국철도노동조합
- Hanja: 全國鐵道勞動組合
- RR: Jeonguk cheoldo nodongjohap
- MR: Chŏn'guk ch'ŏlto nodongjohap

Short name
- Hangul: 철도노조
- Hanja: 鐵道勞組
- RR: Cheoldonojo
- MR: Ch'ŏltonojo

The Korean Railway Workers' Union (KRWU; Korean: 전국철도노동조합) is a labor union of metal workers in South Korea. The KRWU was founded in March 1947 as the Transportation Ministry Association, affiliated with the Federation of Korean Trade Unions.

== See also ==
- 2013 railroad strike in South Korea
