= 2006 South Korean railroad strike =

The South Korean railroad strike of 2006 was a four-day walkout by members of the Korean Railway Workers' Union employed by the Korean National Railroad. It lasted from March 1 to March 4, when the union called a halt to the strike after most of the workers voluntarily returned to work. The number of striking workers fluctuated throughout the strike, but reached over 16,000 workers at its peak. During the strike, Korail's passenger service was decreased by 60%, on both national and Seoul Subway lines. Freight service was also greatly reduced.

The principal issue, which was not resolved during the strike, was Korail's replacement of regular long-term positions with short-term contract positions. The strike was declared illegal by the government after emergency arbitration was imposed, and at least 411 strikers were arrested. 10 of those were indicted on charges of "interference with execution of duty," but the rest were released. 2000 union workers were also suspended by Korail during the incident.

The female KTX attendants' union, whose members are not employed by Korail but by a subcontractor, continued their walkout.

== See also ==
- South Korean KTX Train Attendant Union Strike
