= E-Land strike =

South Korean labor action (2007–2008)

The E-Land strike (Korean: 이랜드 비정규직 대량해고 사태) was a strike of South Korean workers waged by the E-Land labor union against the mass-downsizing initiated by New Core Co. and Homever Outlet, affiliated retail organizations of the E-Land Group. The strike, which lasted for 510 days from June 10, 2007, to November 13, 2008, called for the end of the discriminatory system of irregular employment and the reinstatement of dismissed unionized workers.

== Background ==
=== Irregularly employed workers ===
Irregular employment is a precarious form of employment that provides little to no job security for irregularly employed workers and excludes them from basic labor rights and welfare protections. Furthermore, due to the status as part-time, temporary, subcontracted, independently contracted and daily workers, irregularly employed workers are often denied work benefits entitled to regular workers, including paid sick and vacation leave, health insurance, unemployment compensation, and seniority.

Irregular employment grew rapidly after 1997 when South Korea experienced a national financial crisis, known as the "IMF crisis." The instability of financial markets and the inability of firms to pay short-term loans created a severe debt crisis, not only in South Korea but also in Thailand and Indonesia, resulting in the South Korean government's acceptance of a bailout loan from the International Monetary Fund in the amount of $57 billion. Due to neoliberal loan conditionalities imposed by the IMF, firms were required to reduce labor costs, dismantle employment security and utilize temporary employment system to avoid bankruptcy. Thus, the number of irregularly employed workers in South Korea increased in a progressively larger ratio.

By end of 1998, the number of unemployed in South Korea reached 1.3 million, equivalent to approximately 4.6% of the unemployment rate. In addition to the increase of male unemployment, the number of women workers entering the job market as irregularly employed workers increased. Although the IMF crisis was concluded in South Korea by the time of August 23, 2001, the irregularly employed worker system persisted and was fully utilized by the E-Land Group.

The E-Land Group enlarged their retail business in South Korea upon the end of sovereign default by purchasing New Core Co. in 2003 and the Carrefour (former name of Homever Outlet) in 2006. The majority of the workers in the E-Land stores were irregularly employed workers, mostly consisting of married women over the age of 30 who were earning monthly wage of 800,000 Korean Won which was below the average monthly income.

=== Irregular Employment Protection Act ===
In June 2007, the E-Land Group launched a mass-downsizing by dismissing around 570 irregularly employed workers, mostly supermarket cashiers and sales assistants. The mass-downsizing and the restructuring was a legal pathway for the E-Land Group to avoid the Irregular Employment Protection Act.

Irregular Employment Protection Act was a legislative bill that become effective in 2006 which guaranteed an irregularly employed worker to be promoted as a regular worker after two years of continuous employment. This means, upon the fulfillment of the condition, any irregularly employed worker becomes eligible to receive job benefits, work insurances (national pension, employment insurance, health insurance and workers’ compensation insurance) and job security that is fully protected by the labor rights law. However, in June 2006, only the small portion of the irregularly employed workers were promoted as a regular worker, and around 570 irregularly employed workers were released from New Core Co. and Homever Outlet (Around 220 irregularly employed workers from New Core Co. and 350 from Homever Outlet) by the termination of the contract.

== E-Land strike ==
Upon the termination of the contracts and the downsizing, the E-Land labor union, one of the first irregularly employed workers' labor union organized by KCTU (Korean Confederation of Trade Union), initiated the first strike on June 10, 2007 (an overall strike on June 20, 2007). E-Land labor union demanded the termination of the irregular workforce system and the reinstatement of the 570 released workers. However, neither representatives of New Core Co. and Homever Outlet responded to the demand of the E-Land labor union.

=== Sit-down strike in Homever Outlet of Sangam-dong World Cup Stadium ===
On June 30, 2007, 600 union members of the E-Land labor union initiated a sit-down strike in E-Land's flagship Homever outlet of Sangam-dong World Cup Stadium shopping complex. During the occupation, the union members camped out on the mats and boxes installed next to the row of locked-down cash registers. The sit-down strike was initially planned as a short-term protest. However, the occupation prolonged when the representative of Homever Outlet continued to reject the demand of the E-Land labor union. The occupation lasted 21 days and were forced to stop when riot police intervened on the date of July 20, 2007, the day when there was an A-League Soccer Match held in the stadium.

The E-Land labor union continued the protest by organizing rallies in 40 different Homever retail locations, including the regions of Yatab, Ilsan, PyungChon, Incheon, Gangnam, Sangam, etc. In front of the retail stores, the union members pitched tents and camps and held a sit-down strike. During the process of the sit-down strike, the union members organized picket lines and spread flyers to call for a consumer boycott of all E-Land products.

The impact of the sit-down strike attracted attentions of the media and the public. From the conservative media outlets, E-Land Group was criticized for breaking the livelihood of the union members' family by abusing the Irregular Employment Protection Act. With the support from the media, the E-Land labor union elicited support from various organizations, including 37 different civic organizations, democratic labor party of Seoul province and international union of commerce workers like UNI. In addition, for the first time, KCTU convened a general meeting of the board members to organize a fund-raising campaign to provide financial support for the union members.

=== End of the protest ===
The protest showed signs of conclusion when Samsung Tesco purchased Homever Outlet in May 2008. On November 13, 2008, the representatives of Samsung Tesco and E-Land labor union came to an agreement of ending the protest under following condition: Samsung Tesco - Guaranteed promotion to irregularly employed workers who have exceeded the 16-months of working period, increase of the wage, enhanced work benefits. E-Land labor union - Release of the 12 leaders of the E-Land labor union.

== Timeline ==
- June 4, 2007: Confirmation of 570 irregularly employed workers' (220 from New Core Co., 350 from Homever Outlet) contract termination
- June 10, 2007: First strike of the E-Land labor union
- June 17, 2007: June 18, 2007 - Second Strike / Rally at Sangam-dong Homever Outlet
- June 20, 2007: June 24, 2007 - Third Strike
  - Shut down of Homever Outlet in Sangam-dong Worldcup Stadium for 5 hours
  - Shut down of New Core Co. in Gangnam
- June 25, 2007: Shut down of New Core Co./Homever Outlet in Yatab
- June 26, 2007: Shut down of New Core Co./Homever Outlet in Ilsan
- June 27, 2007: Shut down of New Core Co. in Pyungchon
- June 28, 2007: July 19, 2007 - Fourth strike
  - Shut down of Homever Outlet in Myunmok
  - Shut down of New Core Co. in Dongsoo and Incheon
  - Shut down of Homever Outlet in Sangam-dong Worldcup Stadium and E-Land labor union's sit-down strike in the mall
- July 20, 2007: Intervention of the riot police. End of E-Land labor union's occupation in Homever Outlet in Sangam-dong Worldcup Stadium.
- July 29, 2007: E-Land labor union's sit-down strike in New Core Co. in Gangnam
- July 31, 2007: Riot police intervention to stop the union members' occupation in New Core Co. in Gangnam
- August 18, 2007: E-Land labor union's start of the rally in front of 40 different Homever outlets.
- September 8, 2007: Start of the boycott of E-Land products boycott movement
- December 15, 2007: KCTU general meeting
- January 30, 2008: Focused protest on Homever Outlet initiated by KCTU
- May 14, 2008: Samsung Tesco purchases Homever Outlet
- November 13, 2008: Agreement between Samsung Tesco and E-Land labor union to end the protest
