= Korean Confederation of Trade Unions =

South Korean trade union federation

KCTU
- Korean Confederation of Trade Unions
- Founded: 11 November 1995
- Headquarters: 14F, 3, Jeongdong-gil, Jung-gu, Seoul, South Korea
- Coordinates: 37.5681732680976°N 126.969976113229°E
- Members: 1,134,056 (2020)
- Key people: Kim Myung-hwan, Chairman
- Affiliations: ITUC
- Website: www.kctu.org (English) www.nodong.org (Korean)

- Korean Confederation of Trade Unions
- Hangul: 전국민주노동조합총연맹
- Hanja: 全國民主勞動組合總連盟
- RR: Jeonguk minju nodongjohap chongyeonmaeng
- MR: Chŏn'guk minju nodongjohap ch'ongyŏnmaeng

The Korean Confederation of Trade Unions (KCTU), literally translated as National Confederation of Democratic Trade Unions, also known as Minju-nochong (Korean: 민주노총; an acronym for "KCTU" in Korean), is a national trade union centre in South Korea officially established in 1995. Its predecessor was the National Council of Trade Unions (NCTU), established in 1990 as an independent, democratically operated alternative to the Federation of Korean Trade Unions.

Following the 2016–17 South Korean protests (Candlelight Demonstrations), the KCTU has seen accelerated growth in union enrollment, reaching 1,134,056 members in 2020 and making it the second largest industrial union confederation in Korea.

== History ==
After the liberation from Japanese rule in 1945, and Park Chung Hee's subsequent coup d'état in 1961, there existed only one legal trade union federation in Korea, the Federation of Korean Trade Unions (FKTU). Park's regime was truly authoritarian, and suppressed the activities of all political and business leaders it deemed corrupt. Park restructured the unions, permitting only those he and his regime regarded as "loyal" to their cause.

As a result, for almost two decades under the military regime of President Park, the FKTU was substantially weakened and subordinated to the repressive state, as well as the family-owned conglomerates or Chaebol, which dominated and monopolized the industries in South Korea and expanded incessantly with government help. As a result, the labor movement became very fragmented. It continued to operate through localized unions, such as the miners, textile workers, anti-government activists, and various Catholic groups.

By the 1990s, with the demise of the military regimes, the Chaebol groups began to reassert themselves with the introduction of automation production processes, decentralized factory location of production sites, and began to relocate production to overseas, which worsened the situation for organised labour.

=== Gaining strength and support ===
To sever the relationship from the FKTU, whom many regarded as a government proxy for their subordination to the military regimes, various national federations of the chaebol-based unions emerged, including the Kia and Hyundai Group, as well as regional unions, such as the Masan and Changwon Unions Association. In the public sector, the National Teachers Union was formed in 1989, to counter the perceived authoritarian nature of education in Korea.

However, many trade unions felt the need to consolidate and overcome the fractured nature of the trade unions at the national level. As a result, they formed a national organization, the Korean Confederation of Trade Unions (KCTU) in 1995. Subsequently, their membership increased from 861 unions and 391 000 members in December 1995 to 896 unions and 490,000 members in December 1996. The KCTU had become a formidable force, regarding themselves as an indispensable "check" to the power of the state, employers, and the FKTU.

=== Rise of the Korean Confederation of Trade Unions ===
Despite the internal struggles and factionalism of KCTU, their methods were nonetheless highly effective. In the early 1990s, there was a shift from domestic growth to national competitiveness: one of the major economic policies of Korea became "growth first, and distribution later." The KCTU regarded this as detrimental to the interests of the workers, and adopted the counter-policy of "strike first, bargain later." Korean workers used strikes as a weapon to seek political change, better working conditions, and for higher wages.

In 1996, a significant event occurred that catapulted the KCTU to both the national and world stage. The New Korea Party, led by President Kim Young Sam, unilaterally passed and amended labor laws without the presence of the opposition party in the middle of the night, in a six-minute session. In essence, the amended laws made it significantly easier for the employers to lay off the workers at will. The amended laws did not allow federal unions at either the local or the national level. This made the 500,000 member KCTU illegal. It was not legally recognized until 2002. These provisions prompted the KCTU to successfully mobilize 150,000 Korean workers and FKTU leaders, who previously displayed a pro-government propensity, to strike together.

As a result of the government's decision to amend labor laws, President Kim Young Sam and his administration were censured by the OECD for their failure to honor the reforms which were promised to the people of South Korea, and for displaying "backwardness" with respect to labor-law reform. International organisations, including the International Confederation of Free Trade Unions and International Metal Workers Unions both criticized and condemned the actions of the Korean government.

The foreign union representatives held joint news conferences with Korean unions, closely observed the strikes, and held various demonstrations outside Korean diplomatic missions abroad. Despite the overwhelming rebuke from the international community, the South Korean government chose to adhere to their initial decision and even threatened to arrest the strikers. It has been estimated that the three weeks' strikes cost $3.4 billion in lost production.

President Kim Young Sam, recognizing the growing popular support for the KCTU, decided to revise the laws and to meet with opposition leaders. In March 1997, parliament passed a more diluted version of the labor laws and the President's chief economic adviser, who was the proponent of the earlier laws, was fired along with other advisers. Finally, during a meeting with the opposition leaders, President Kim stated that the KCTU would be legalized.

=== Conflicting results of the January 1997 strike ===
The results of the January strike varied. Ostensibly, the strike was of historic significance - it was extremely well managed and organized on a national level, and achieved lasting legal reform. It was successful in both political and economic terms. But more importantly, for the first time, labor had emerged as a leading social force in South Korea. The KCTU obtained their long-sought recognition by the government. Furthermore, they were granted the right to form multiple unions at the industry level (although they were prevented from forming unions amongst the teachers and public servants).

Conversely, many people believed that the revised law was very deficient in its substance. For example, the employers still retained their right to lay off workers at their discretion, after only a two-year deferment. The "no work, no pay" rule and no payment to full-time union leaders was still applicable in the revised laws, including the flexible workday policy in an effort to reduce wages. Hence, the employers were able to strengthen their power while the workers lost protection from lay-offs and the job security they sought so desperately.

=== Limitations of the KCTU ===
1997 was a devastating year for both the people of South Korea and the country when an economic crisis happened. By November 1997, many conglomerates including Hanbo, as well as several chaebol groups, were bankrupt. In addition, numerous banks became insolvent. In spite of both the Bank of Korea and the government's effort to curtail the economic turmoil, the exchange rate and the stock market went into a free-fall. Korea was in danger of defaulting on its foreign debt obligations. On December 3, 1997, the International Monetary Fund decided to give its largest ever bailout package to South Korea, consisting of $57 billion. Included in the package, various harsh conditions were attached.

The IMF demanded stringent requirements. In addition to restructuring its financial and corporate sectors, Korea was to "liberalize" its markets - it needed to open up its markets in such a way that would benefit the foreign investors. In an effort to secure the jobs of the workers, KCTU implemented a nationwide signature campaign for the guarantee of jobs for workers and sought to punish the people responsible for the devastating economic crisis. Moreover, they organized approximately 30,000 people at a rally and demanded political reforms and sought protection from the impending arbitrary layoffs, hence the General Strike of 1997. The General Strike was supported by the blue collar and white collar workers, including the financial sector and clerical workers.

The strike was also supported by the general population, and despite the state control of the media, the Internet acted as a conduit in providing real time information to the outside world, for the first time. Despite the efforts of the KCTU in organizing the General Strike, the results were very disappointing. Whether it was imposed by the IMF or by the government, the bailout requirements gave significant discretion to the chaebol with respect to laying off the workers. Moreover, those upper and mid-level workers who had failed to unionise in fear of losing their jobs, were caught completely off guard. The economic crisis also compelled the government to enact laws without seeking the input from the unions, exacerbating the ongoing conflicts. As a result of the mandated restructure by the IMF, labor disputes inevitably escalated from 78 in 1997, to 129 in 1998.

=== 2013 police raid ===
On 22 December 2013, hundreds of riot police raided the KCTU's headquarters in Seoul injuring hundreds. Six senior KCTU leaders were arrested for supporting a national railway strike which the government declared "illegal". According to the International Trade Union Confederation and the International Transport Workers' Federation: "The government of South Korea and its anti-union behaviour is again in the spotlight of the international community. Its actions run contrary to its obligations to the ILO and also the labour standards in trade agreements with the US and the EU. Further, the government is failing to fulfill its original commitment to the OECD, upon accession, to respect international labour standards."

== Factions ==
There are three main factions of KCTU: the Nationalists(국민파), the Centralists(중앙파), and the Activists(현장파). The Nationalist faction inherited the student group tendency "National Liberation (NL)" in the 1980s that advocated leftist nationalism. The Nationalists is generally favorable to Democratic Party of Korea and Progressive Party, and is strong among construction workers.

The Centralists inherited the student group tendency "People's Democracy (PD)" in the 1980s that advocated marxism-leninism. However, it now has a social democratic tendency, and mostly centre-left positioning. It is favorable to Justice Party. The Centralist faction's main support base is chemical workers.

The Activists is an ultra-left faction that advocates revolutionary socialism and Trotskyism. Although it has a small number of members internally, it has strong influence on KCTU general. It mainly supports the Labor Party, and its support base is transportation workers.

The exact number of members of the three major factions cannot be estimated, but Korean media outlets analyze that the Nationalist is the largest faction with a 60% share of the total. Next are the centralists with 30% and the activists with 10%.

After the 2020 KCTU leadership election, the Nationalists was divided into the Social Agreement faction(사회적 합의주의) and the National Conference faction(전국회의). The Social Agreement faction, led by former KCTU leader Kim Myeong-hwan, is a right-wing faction that is favorable to the Democratic Party and values class compromise. By contrast, the National Conference faction is a socialist left-wing faction that supports the Progressive Party and emphasizes traditional class struggle. The National Conference faction has been leading the KCTU since winning decisive victories in leadership elections, which held in 2020 and 2023. The current KCTU leader, Yang Kyung-soo, is also from the National Conference faction.

== Other activities ==
The KCTU is a labor union with a prominent leftist tendency and has traditionally supported the labor movement of foreign workers living in South Korea. In 2001, a labor union of only foreign workers under the KCTU was formed, which is said to be the first in South Korean history. As of 2022, the KCTU has spoken on the issue of human rights violations against foreign workers.

On 29 May 2024, the National Democratic General Labor Union, a member of the Confederation of Trade Unions, the approved the creation of the Native Teachers' Union, a union for foreign teachers teaching their native language in public and private schools around the country, as well as in universities. The Teachers' Union claimed 200 members and three regional branches (Seoul, Busan, and Chungcheong) at the time of launch.

During the 2024 South Korean martial law declaration, the KCTU called for a general strike to reverse the declaration of martial law and impeach President Yoon Suk Yeol.

== Criticism ==
Within three years of its existence, KCTU managed significant achievements, including legally recognized by the government and gained substantial national prominence. With more than half a million members and its ability to mobilize tens of thousands of workers at any given time, KCTU was now a legitimate force that could not be ignored. Nevertheless, voices of discontent within the union were growing.

On January 14, 1998, the Labor Management Government Tripartite Council was formed, as mandated by the IMF. It was a concerted effort on all three parties to equally "share" the pain and suffering associated with the economic crisis. As a part of the "share" of the union, KCTU leadership conceded the redundancy layoffs in the case of emergency affecting the companies, something that the union members had consistently rejected. And consequently, the union members of the KCTU voted out the leadership who they deemed were responsible for the grave mistake and elected a hard liner, Lee Kap-Yong as their new president.

In response to the economic crisis, KCTU membership levels had also declined. It fell by 9 per cent or 40,783 members, between January and October 1998. To mitigate further layoffs by the employers, KCTU affiliates have engaged in strike action at the Hyundai Motor Company in August and September 1998. Although the company had intended to layoff 1500 employees, as the result of more than a month of stoppage during which some union members went on hunger strikes and national support was given by other trade unions, Hyundai was compelled to reduce the numbers being laid off to 277. But nevertheless, they could not prevent the membership of KCTU from declining.

One of the more important dynamics of labor has been left in obscurity thus far, the treatment of the female workforce in Korea. In this respect, all trade unions including, KCTU were criticized in unison for their lack of interest of the female workers. Their failure to address the concerns of harsh working conditions and numerous labor rights violations are extremely unfortunate and incomprehensible. KCTU was also criticized for being indifferent to the issue of employment of the disabled and for not showing efforts to improve the equal working rights of the disabled.

The trade unions in South Korea had been historically repressed by their governments for almost five decades. From the creation of the First Republic of Korea, from President Syngman Rhee and subsequent military generals who ruled for the next thirty years, all suppressed the unions and deliberately dishonored the constitution of the country, for the sake of the "progress" of the nation. However, with the inception of KCTU in 1995, South Korea and its people began to see a glimpse of hope. They in essence, profoundly changed the dynamics of the relationship between the capitalists, state, and the workers. KCTU, from its meager start successfully solidified themselves as an indispensable partner with respect to the workers’ rights of Korea.

From an illegal entity, they were invited by their government to be a "partner" in the national decision-making process. Stated differently, they were recognized as a formidable force that could no longer be ignored. The culmination of their status came during the presidential election of 1997, when KCTU now the second largest union, nominated Kwon Young-Gil, as the fifth presidential candidate of South Korea.

Despite their achievements, they had their share of deficiencies that included internal fragmentation, decline in their memberships, and the neglect of female workforce in Korea. Therefore, although KCTU had elevated the political and social status of organized labor, ironically, they were impelled to accept various labor changes that would ultimately harm and hinder the worker's positions in Korea.

== See also ==
- Trade unions in South Korea
- Working hours in South Korea
- Democratic Labor Party (South Korea)
- Korean Government Employees' Union
- 1996–1997 strikes in South Korea
