= Working hours in South Korea =

Time length people are allowed to work in South Korea

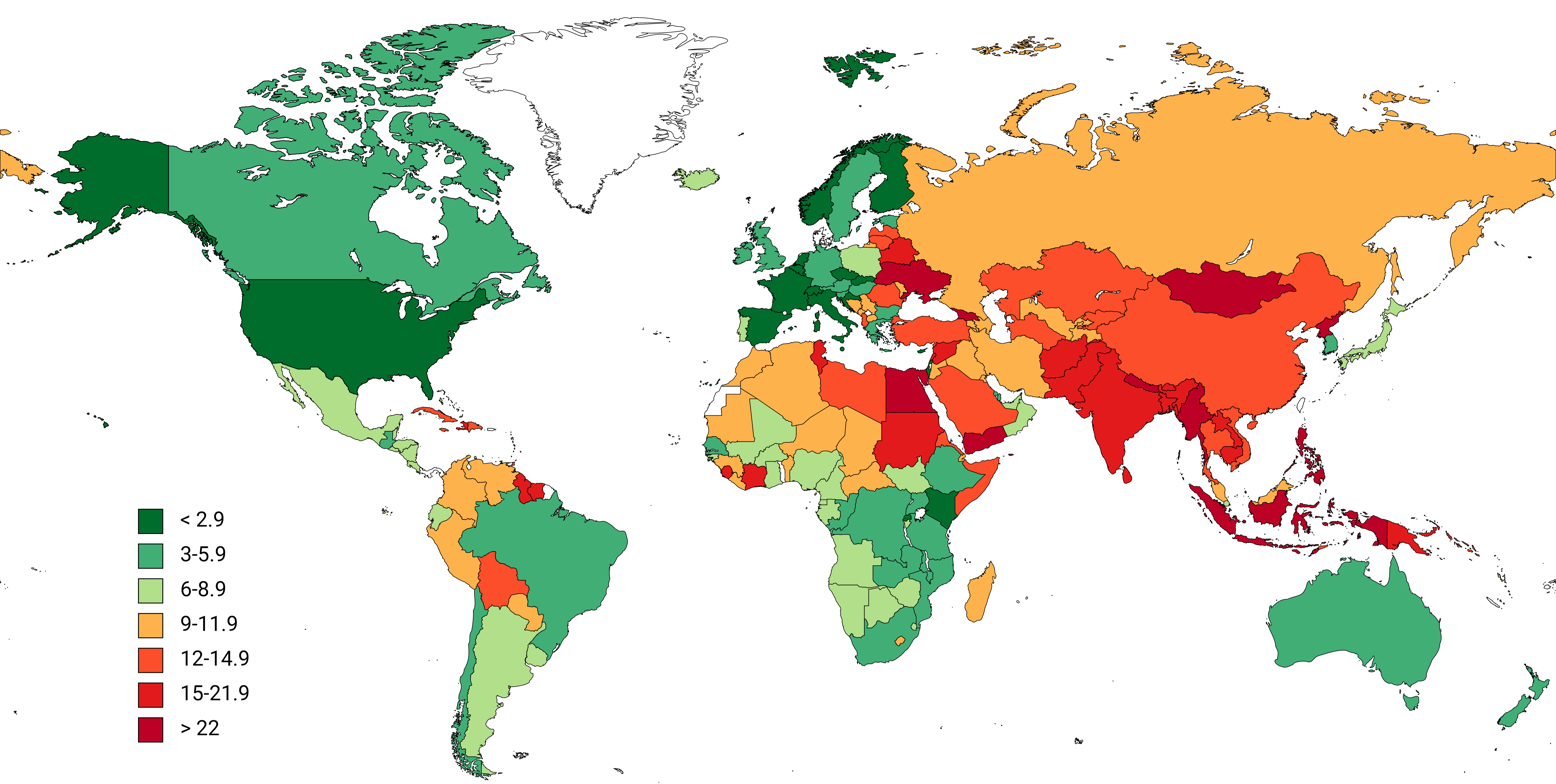
Deaths due to long working hours per 100,000 people (15+), joint study conducted by World Health Organization and International Labour Organization in 2016.

Working hours in South Korea define the length of time workers are allowed to be on the job in South Korea. In the 1960s, South Korea began to transform itself from an agricultural economy to an industrial, service and high-tech-oriented economy. Since then, the country's per capita GDP increased from US$100 in 1963 to US$35,300 in 2014, turning South Korea into the 20th largest economy in the world. In the process, work hours increased. According to OECD figures, annual working hour levels in South Korea were at 1,872/worker in 2023. As a consequence, Korea now ranks 5th on OECD ranking, compared to 1,810 annual hours in the US, 1,607 in Japan, 1,531 in the UK, and 1,340 in Germany (the lowest among OECD countries).

== Dynamics ==
Koreans work such long hours, among other reasons, because of the Korean industrial system and nighttime culture. South Korea's corporate culture resembles that of Japan–hierarchical and with significant subcontracting, both factors increasing working hours. Even though Korea has a statutory limit working week of 40 hours/week, also allowing for 12 hours of paid overtime on weekdays and 16 hours on weekends, manufacturing companies such as the automobile industry operate at a non-stop basis. In addition, cafes, transportation, pubs, restaurants, private study rooms, shopping malls, and fast food restaurants also operate continuously. Although the Labor Standard Act has previously sets statutory limits, enforcement is weak and employers routinely violate the Act.

Those searching for a work to life balance have argued that a reduction in the hours in an average workday would lead to an enhancement in the current work to life balance of Korean workers. However, those changes would require a substantial transformation of the Korean corporate culture (Beech 2020).

Work life balance is becoming increasingly harder to achieve for working class citizens, particularly people with families.

== Different working hours in terms of jobs and productivity ==
As of 2014, 80.7% of the Labor Standard Act had been implemented. The 40 hour working week met with 93% success in the manufacturing industry as compared with 73.1% elsewhere. Implementation in the public sector (99%) is higher than in the private sector (80.5%).

Male workers in manufacturing industry are allowed 24.10 overtime work hours while non-manufacturing workers get 10.90 hours. Public sector can work 11.06 hours overtime, while private sector workers are allowed 16.06 hours. Even though Korea has implemented the 40 hour work week, workers in South Korea appear satisfied with their job and lives. A higher salary has a positive and significant impact on worker' job and life satisfaction. They tend to be satisfied with longer hours. However, longer work hours do not necessarily mean greater productivity. Employers use overtime because the costs are much less (9,045 won/hr or $8) than e.g., in France, where businesses are heavily taxed.

According to the PLOS ONE research article The negative impact of long working hours on mental health in young Korean workers, One of the causes is the unhealthy manners linked with working overtime, such as increased alcohol intake and lack of physical activity. In addition, the employees working extended hours may not have the time to obtain proper medical treatment when they become sick. Additionally, working lengthy hours may cause hypertension, diabetes, and metabolic syndrome and is linked to ischemic heart disease, stroke, and increased mortality (Park 2020).

Statistics show that in 2019 “workers aged between 30 and 39 years old worked 158.9 hours per month on average in South Korea. In 2020, a new policy was introduced in South Korea that limited the weekly working hours to 52 hours per week” (Yoon 2020). Statistics also show the steady decline of monthly work hours for each of the age groups between under 29 years old to over 60 years old age, which could be because of the evolving work culture by the younger generation. In 2019, the average hours worked by plant and machine operators and assemblers worked was 178.2 hours a month in South Korea. Working hours had declined across all jobs compared to the year before (Yoon 2020).

These statistics are promising and go along with the increasing value of the work to life balance that many in the world strive for. “Korean corporate culture has been deeply influenced by the philosophy and traditions of Confucianism. Individuals are expected to show respect for their elders and superiors in the workplace. Within this construct, workers cannot graciously leave the office before his or her manager” (Beech 2015).

== See also ==
- South Korean Labor Movement
