= Federation of Korean Trade Unions =

South Korean trade union federation

FKTU
- Federation of Korean Trade Unions
- 한국노동조합총연맹
- Founded: 1960
- Headquarters: Seoul, South Korea
- Location: South Korea
- Members: 1,153,863 (2020)
- Affiliations: ITUC
- Website: fktu.or.kr inochong.org

- Federation of Korean Trade Unions
- Hangul: 한국노동조합총연맹
- Hanja: 韓國勞動組合總聯盟
- RR: Hanguk nodongjohap chongyeonmaeng
- MR: Han'guk nodongjohap ch'ongyŏnmaeng

The Federation of Korean Trade Unions (FKTU) is a national trade union center in South Korea formed in 1960. It represents the company union tendency of the South Korean labour movement, as opposed to the more militant Korean Confederation of Trade Unions (KCTU).

After the May 16 coup in 1961, the Park Chung Hee regime dissolved the General Federation of Korean Trade Unions and its affiliates. The FKTU was placed under the guidance of the military authorities.

The FKTU was the sole legal trade union center in South Korea until the KCTU was recognized in November 1999. The Korean Government previously considered the KCTU as a terrorist organisation.

The FKTU is affiliated with the International Trade Union Confederation.

== See also ==
- Trade unions in South Korea

History:

- 1996–1997 strikes in South Korea
