= Daehangno =

Area in Seoul, South Korea

Coordinates: 37°34′37″N 127°00′07″E

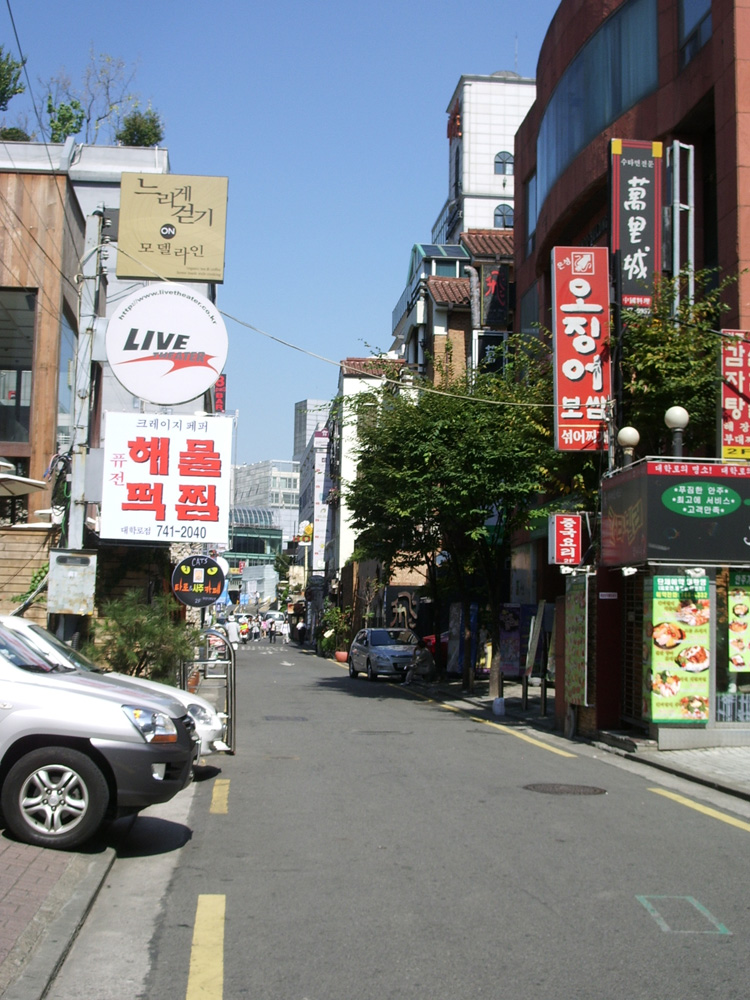

Korean name
- Hangul: 대학로
- Hanja: 大學路
- RR: Daehangno
- MR: Taehangno

Former name
- Hangul: 숭교방
- Hanja: 崇敎坊
- RR: Sunggyobang
- MR: Sunggyobang

Daehangno (Korean: 대학로; lit. 'college road') is a road in Jongno District, Seoul, connecting Jongno 50ga 82-1 (Jongno 5-ga Intersection) to Hyehwa-dong Rotary). It also refers to the surrounding area, a hub of cultural and artistic activity. The section from Jongno 5-ga to Ewha Intersection is a four-lane road, while the section from Ewha Intersection to Hyehwa-dong Rotary is a six-lane road. The Road derives its name from the former location of Seoul National University's College of Liberal Arts and Sciences.

== Overview ==
As part of Seoul National University's comprehensive development plan, there were two arguments: one against the relocation, which argued that the historical value and locality of the Dongsung-dong campus as the birthplace of higher education should be preserved, and the other in favor of the relocation, which argued that it was right to liquidate the remnants of Japanese colonial rule by erasing the traces of Gyeongseong Imperial University during the Japanese colonial period. The latter was chosen, and the Dongsung-dong campus was gradually relocated to Sillim-dong, Gwanak-gu, Seoul, starting in January 1975. It was named Daehak-ro because it was the road that passed right next to the Dongsung-dong campus.

On May 4, 1985, the government initiated the creation of a "Culture and Arts Street" in the Daehak-ro area, and cultural groups and theaters scattered throughout Seoul began to gather there. As Gyeongseong Imperial University was established and later renamed Seoul National University, this area, where university culture dominated, came to be called a "youth paradise". In 2004, it was designated as the second "cultural district" in Seoul after Insa-dong, becoming a street representing Seoul's culture.

== History ==
On November 26, 1966 the section from Ssangnim-dong (106 Ssangnim-dong, Jung-gu) to Hyehwa-dong Rotary (132 Hyehwa-dong, Jongno-gu) was named Daehak-ro. In 1981 the starting point was extended to Jangchungdan Park. On November 7, 1984 the section from Jongno 5-ga to Jangchungdan Park was designated as Hyeonryunwon-ro. On June 22, 2003 the section from Jongno 5-ga to Ihwa Intersection was converted to one-way traffic toward Hyehwa-dong, and the section from Ihwa Intersection to Hyehwa-dong Rotary was converted to differential lanes. In 2009 the section from Jongno 5-ga to Ihwa Intersection was converted to differential lanes. On April 22, 2010 Jongno-gu announced the road name and address.

== Major Stations ==
Seoul

- Jongno-gu (Jongno 5-ga - Hyoje-dong - Yeonji-dong - Yeongeon-dong - Dongsung-dong - Myeongnyun 4-ga - Hyehwa-dong)

== Features ==
In 1975, when Seoul National University relocated to Sillim-dong, Gwanak-gu, Marronnier Park was created in its place. With an outdoor performance hall and a Pungryu Madang (traditional Korean folk music venue), it attracts a large youth population. Originally, the area from Jongno 5-ga Station to Ewha Intersection was a one-way street, but now traffic is restricted to one lane in each direction from Ewha Intersection to Jongno 5-ga Station. Motorized vehicles (excluding emergency vehicles) are prohibited from 10:00 PM to 6:00 AM between Ewha Intersection and Hyehwa Rotary.

== Key Buildings and Facilities ==
- Global Food Art Capital College (8 Daehak-ro, Jongno-gu, Seoul)
- Seoul Metropolitan Office of Education (10 Daehak-ro, Jongno-gu, Seoul)
- Seoul Hyoje Elementary School (12 Daehak-ro, Jongno-gu, Seoul)
- Seoul Regional Tax Office Hyoje Annex (42 Daehak-ro, Jongno-gu, Seoul)
- NH Nonghyup Bank Daehak-ro Branch (49 Daehak-ro, Jongno-gu, Seoul)
- Hongik University Daehak-ro Campus (57 Daehak-ro, Jongno-gu, Seoul)
- Seoul National University College of Education Elementary School (64 Daehak-ro, Jongno-gu, Seoul)
- Seoul National University College of Education Girls' Middle School (64 Daehak-ro, Jongno-gu, Seoul)
- KT Hyehwa Branch (65 Daehak-ro, Jongno-gu, Seoul)
- Korea National Open University Headquarters (86 Daehak-ro, Jongno-gu, Seoul)
- Seoul Jongno Fire Station Yeongeon 119 Safety Center (91 Daehak-ro, Jongno-gu, Seoul)
- St. Beda Anglican Church of Korea (93 Daehak-ro, Jongno-gu, Seoul)
- Shinhan Bank Hamchunhoe-gwan Branch (95 Daehak-ro, Jongno-gu, Seoul)
- Seoul National University Hospital (101 Daehak-ro, Jongno-gu, Seoul)
  - Seoul National University Cancer Hospital
  - Seoul National University Children's Hospital
  - Seoul National University Dental Hospital
  - Seoul Regional Emergency Medical Center
  - Seoul National University Hospital Medical Research Innovation Center (91 Daehak-ro, Jongno-gu, Seoul)
- Seoul National University Yeongeon Campus (103 Daehak-ro, Jongno-gu, Seoul)
- Saemaul Geumgo Seoul National University Hospital Main Branch (103 Daehak-ro, Jongno-gu, Seoul)
- NH Nonghyup Bank Seoul Daeyeongeon Branch (103 Daehak-ro, Jongno-gu, Seoul)
- Kookmin Bank Daehak-ro Branch (116 Daehak-ro, Jongno-gu, Seoul)
- Hyehwa Station (Basement 120 Daehak-ro, Jongno-gu, Seoul)
- Lotte Supermarket (146 Daehak-ro, Jongno-gu, Seoul)
- Dongseong Middle School (156 Daehak-ro, Jongno-gu, Seoul)
- Dongseong High School (156 Daehak-ro, Jongno-gu, Seoul)
- Hyemyung Church of the Korean Methodist Church (6 Daehak-ro 11-gil, Jongno-gu, Seoul)
- Gonggongilho Public Ground (116 Daehak-ro, Jongno-gu, Seoul)

== See also ==
- Marronnier Park
- Seoul National University
