= Hyehwa station =

Train station in Seoul, South Korea

Coordinates: 37.58228°N 127.00187°E

혜화; Hyehwa
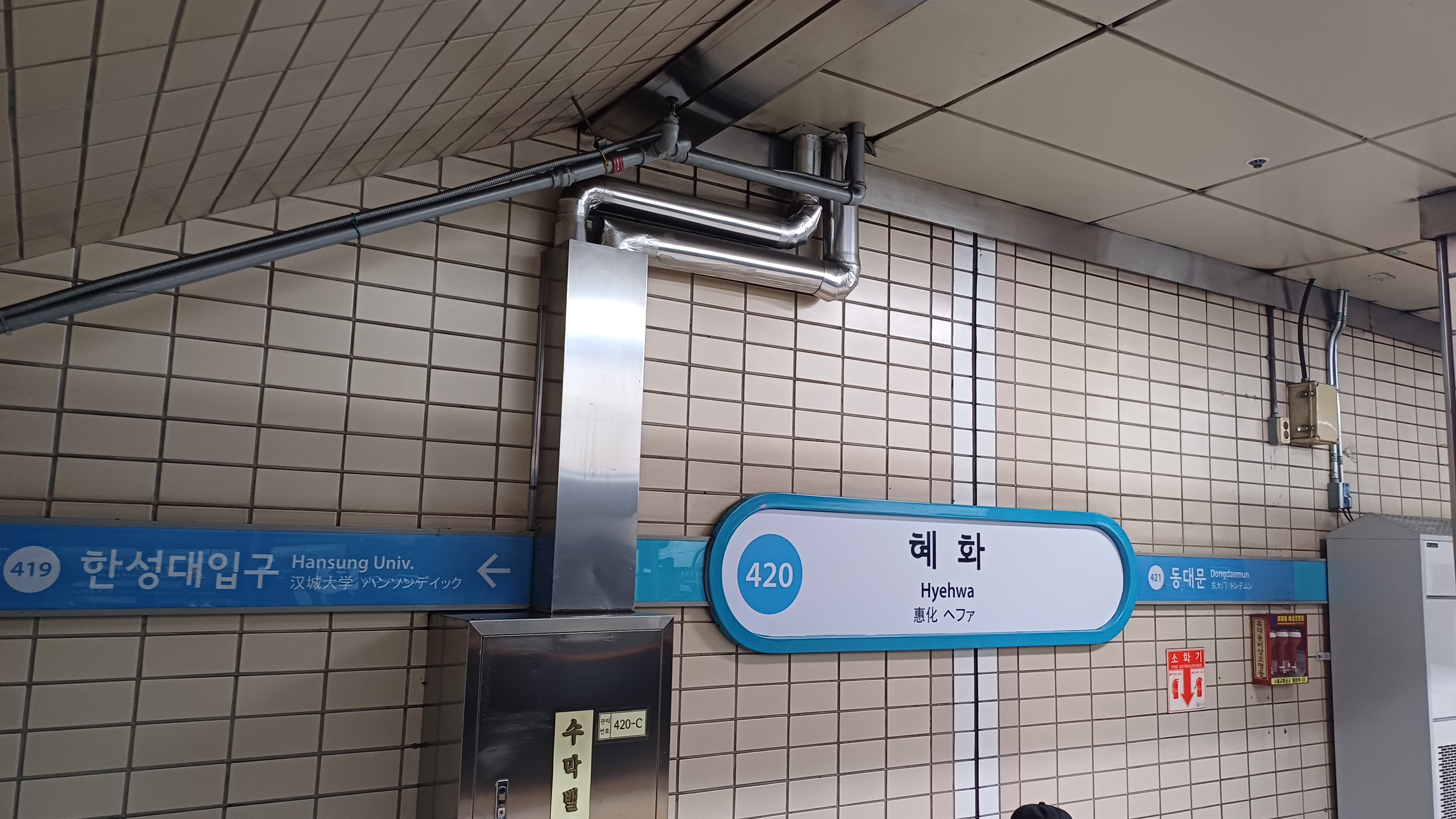

Korean name
- Hangul: 혜화역
- Hanja: 惠化驛
- Revised Romanization: Hyehwa-yeok
- McCune–Reischauer: Hyehwa-yŏk

General information
- Location: 120 Daehangno Jiha, Jongno-gu, Seoul
- Operator: Seoul Metro
- Line: Line 4
- Platforms: 2
- Tracks: 2

Construction
- Structure type: Underground

Key dates
- October 18, 1985: Line 4 opened

Passengers
- (Daily) Based on Jan-Dec of 2012. Line 4: 89,716
Location

Hyehwa Station (Korean: 혜화역) is a station on the Seoul Subway Line 4 in Jongno District, Seoul. It is located in the center of the area commonly known as Daehangno, and much of the ridership of this station comes from the nightlife scene. The Seoul National University Yongon campus, housing its Hospital and School of Medicine, is located to the southwest.

The station was the center of the 2018–2019 Hyehwa Station protest to rally against discrimination of women and spy camera crimes.

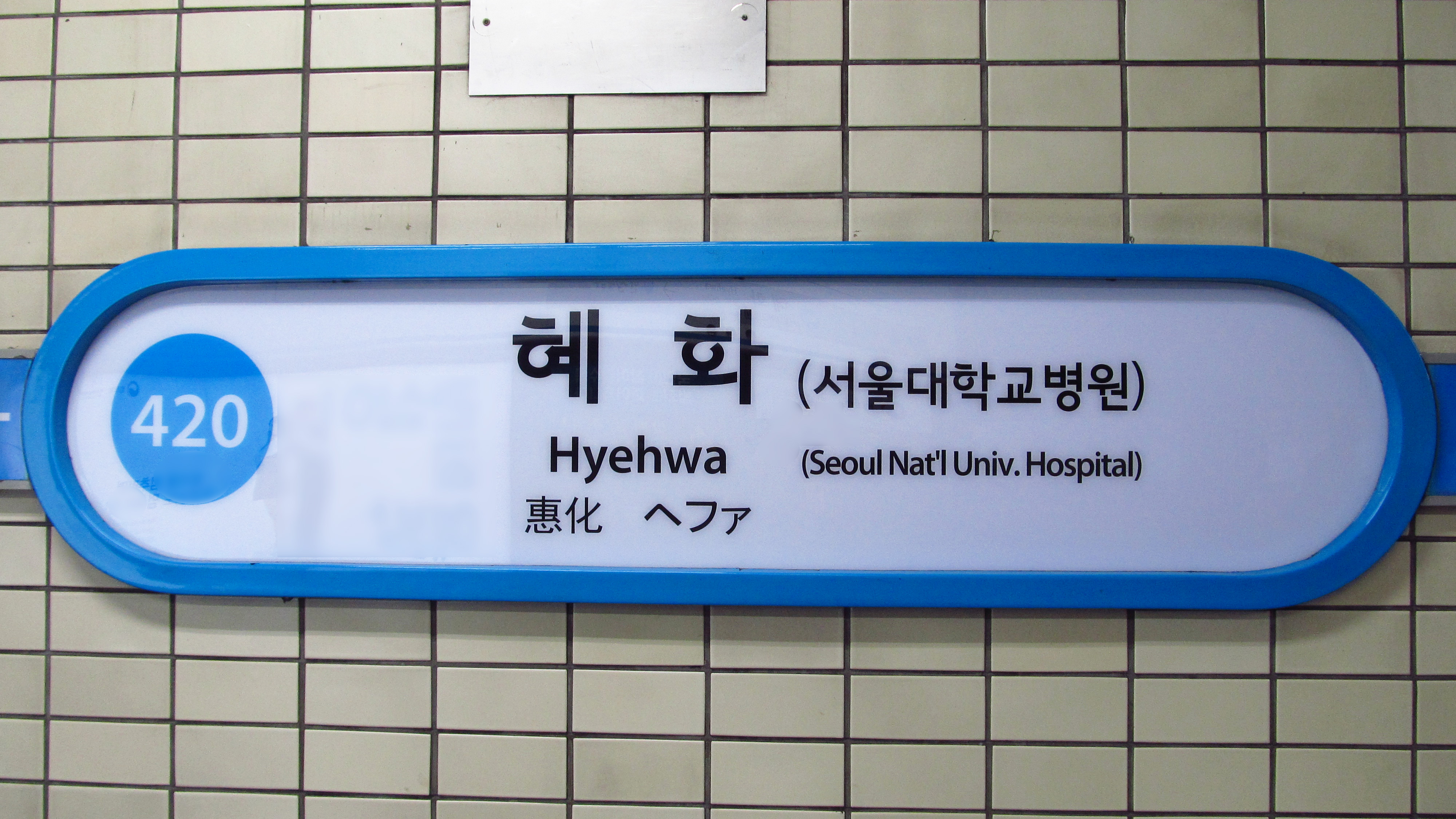
The station nameplate with the previous subname

== Station layout ==
G	Street level	Exit

L1; Concourse	Lobby	Customer Service, Shops, Vending machines, ATMs

L2; Platforms	Side platform, doors will open on the right
L2; Platforms	Northbound	← Line 4 toward Jinjeop (Hansung Univ.)
L2; Platforms	Southbound	Line 4 toward Oido (Dongdaemun) →
L2; Platforms	Side platform, doors will open on the right

== Vicinity ==
- Exit 1 : The Holy Spirit Campus of the Catholic University of Korea, Dongseong Middle & High Schools
- Exit 2 : Marronnier Park, Korean National Open University
- Exit 3 : Seoul National University Hospital & Yeongeon Campus (Medical School)
- Exit 4 : Sungkyunkwan University, Changgyeonggung, Seoul Science High School, Hansung University Design campus

== See also ==
- Hyehwa Station Protest

Preceding station	Seoul Metropolitan Subway	Following station
Hansung University towards Jinjeop	Line 4	Dongdaemun towards Oido
