= Seoul National University Venture Town station =

Metro station in Seoul, South Korea

S410 서울대벤처타운 Seoul National Univ. Venture Town
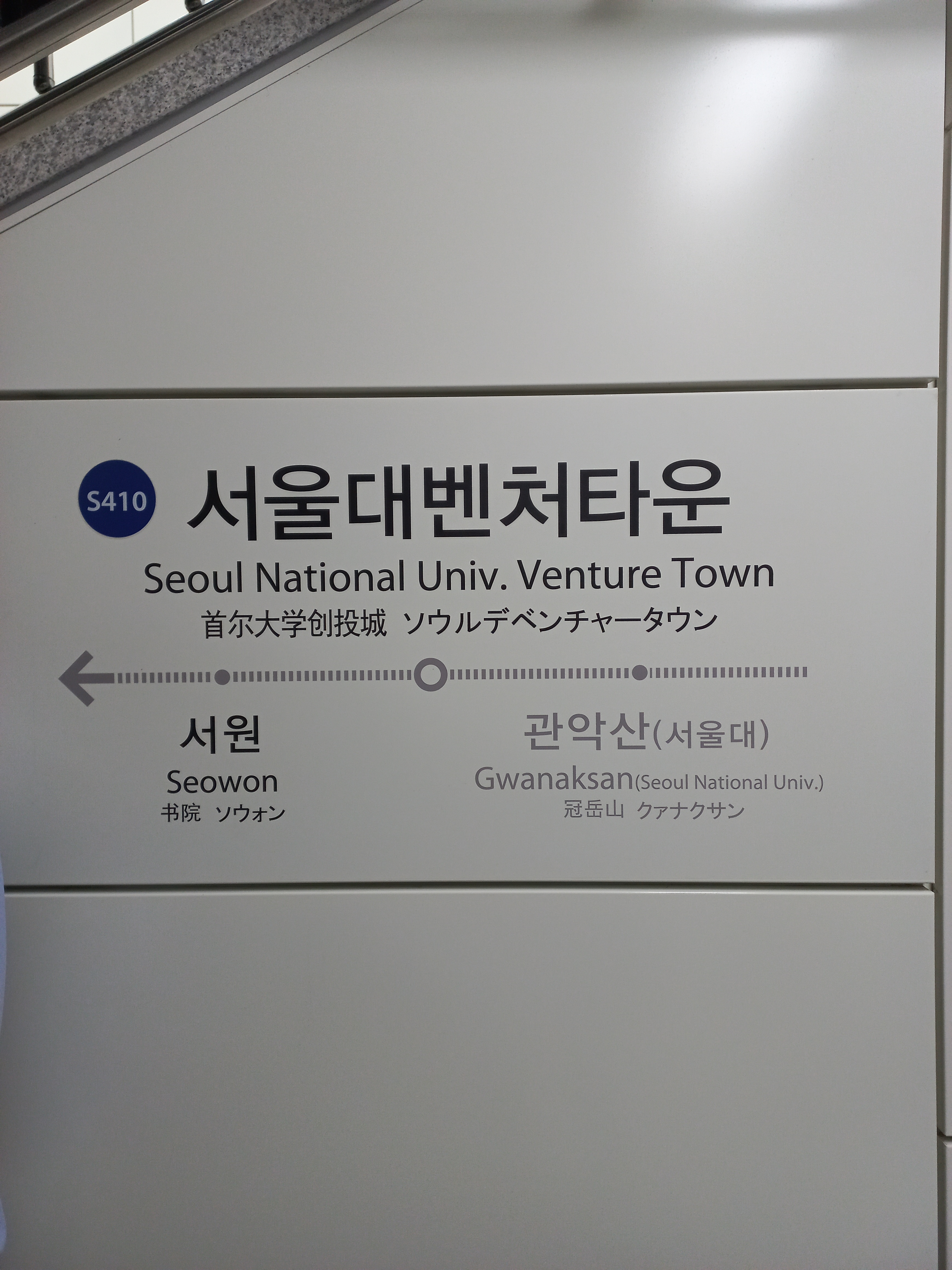

Korean name
- Hangul: 서울대벤처타운역
- Hanja: 서울大벤처타운驛
- Revised Romanization: Seouldaebencheotaun-yeok
- McCune–Reischauer: Sŏuldaebench'ŏt'aun-yŏk

General information
- Location: 110-10 Sillim-dong, Gwanak-gu, Seoul
- Coordinates: 37.4719°N 126.9337°E
- Operated by: South Seoul LRT Co., Ltd.
- Line: Sillim Line
- Platforms: 2
- Tracks: 2

Construction
- Structure type: Underground

History
- Opened: May 28, 2022
Location

Seoul National University Venture Town Station is a station on the Sillim Line. It is located in Sillim-dong, Gwanak-gu, Seoul.

Preceding station	Seoul Metropolitan Subway	Following station
Seowon towards Saetgang	Sillim Line	Gwanaksan Terminus
