= Womad (website) =

South Korean website

WOMAD 워마드
- Website type: Textboard
- Owner: Unknown
- Website: womad.life
- Commercial: Free board is open to everyone without charge
- Registration: Optional
- Launched: 2016

WOMAD (Korean: 워마드) is an online community of women based in South Korea. It was founded in 2016, after it split from Megalia, another radical feminist online community, after Megalia began restricting the use of homophobic and transphobic slurs.

It is widely classified as misandric, homophobic, and transphobic. A number of its members admitted to being involved in crimes, including the drugging and sexual assault of an Australian boy.

== Overview ==
WOMAD split from Megalia on January 22, 2016. "WOMAD" is a combination of the words "woman" and "nomad". It formed due to Megalia issuing a ban on the use of certain explicit slurs against gay men and transgender people. This change in policy led to the migration of anti-LGBT members. WOMAD users respond to discrimination against women in South Korea by "mirroring" it against men. According to experts, this is a reaction to Ilbe Storage, a right-wing website that is also based in South Korea. The website has contributed to an anti-feminist backlash in South Korea. However, according to WOMAD itself, its users are not a feminist group.

WOMAD has caused controversy due to extreme online trolling, such as postings that boast animal abuse. Others show extreme hatred towards gay and transgender people; for this reason, WOMAD has been called "Korean-style TERFs". They have also been described as "neoliberal". Users of the site remained supportive of the former President of South Korea, Park Geun-hye, after she was imprisoned following the 2016 South Korean political scandal. It was embroiled in a number of accusations for mocking Korean War veterans, the Catholic Church, and labor rights activists. A number of posts mocking the deceased actor Kim Joo-hyuk caused further controversy. Following such incidents, critics lambasted WOMAD as a "hateful website that is aggravating conflict and division of society" among South Koreans.

The site has a voting system similar to Reddit, allowing users to upvote or downvote posts. It uses a swastika symbol in the 'thumbs-up' button, with '워념글 추천' written below, meaning 'suggest this as an insightful article' in Korean. Its favicon is a representation of a vulva, with red dot at the center of it representing both period blood and fire.

== Incidents ==
=== Claims of murders targeting men ===
In 2016, multiple posts appeared on the site, claiming that they had killed men with titles such as "I fed men coffee mixed with car antifreeze liquid" and "I killed a man by pushing him into a reservoir". The Ulsan Metropolitan Police Agency and the Gwangju Metropolitan Police Agency started an investigation after receiving police reports on July 28, 2016. Several shutdown requests have been made against the community, but Daum Kakao dismissed the requests stating that "some posts have been hidden, but there is insufficient illegal activity within the community to shut it down".

=== Child-abuse incident in Australia ===
On November 19, 2017, a member wrote a post on the WOMAD forum claiming that she had drugged and raped an Australian boy. She uploaded photos and videos allegedly portraying her raping the boy. WOMAD members showed support for the writer, leaving comments saying that they would pay to watch the videos of the sexual assault. News of the post quickly spread online and a petition was started on Cheong Wa Dae's bulletin board requesting that the person responsible be caught. On November 20, 2017, a 27-year-old Korean woman was arrested by the Australian Federal Police in Darwin, Northern Territory in relation to the incident. The suspect was charged with producing child abuse materials. According to interviews with the victim's parents, it is suspected that her identification and credentials are fake and that she could have broken immigration and labor laws. WOMAD members actively defended her, claimed that the suspect was innocent and conducted an online fundraiser for her lawyer appointment. In addition, they sent a petition to the Australian police to release the suspect and protested the victim's parents. Many were shocked by this incident. She was ultimately released on bail and deported, evading prosecution.

=== Hidden camera incident ===
In 2018, a WOMAD user posted a nude photo of a male model, obtained using a hidden camera (or molka). The user was quickly arrested. WOMAD users alleged that she was arrested quickly due to her sex. The incident led to the Hyehwa Station Protest.

== See also ==
- DC Inside
- Feminism in South Korea
- Gender-based violence
- Misandry
