= Seowon station =

Metro station in Seoul, South Korea

S409 서원 Seowon
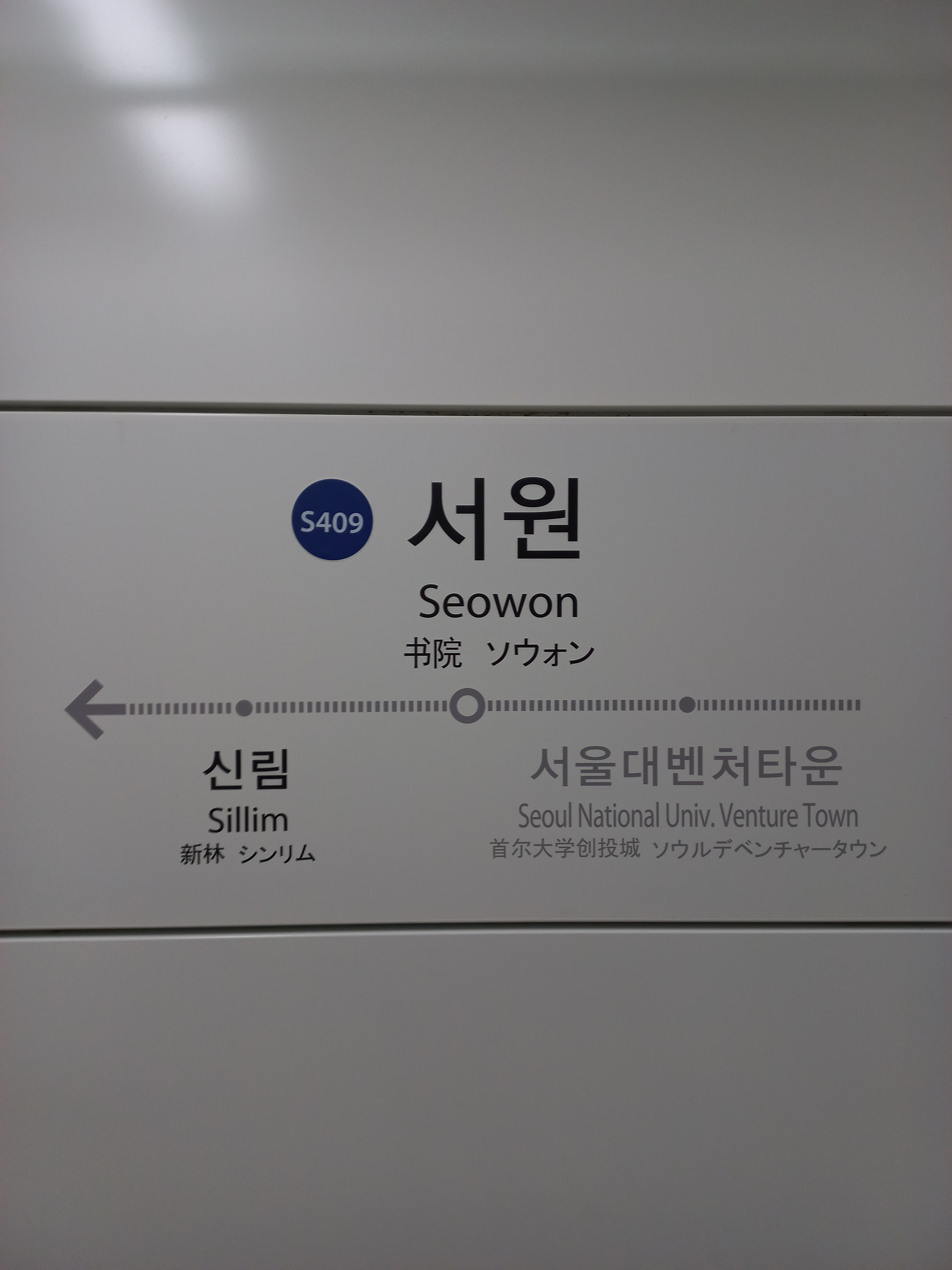

Korean name
- Hangul: 서원역
- Hanja: 書院驛
- Revised Romanization: Seowon-yeok
- McCune–Reischauer: Sŏwŏn-yŏk

General information
- Location: 808-407 Sillim-dong, Gwanak-gu, Seoul
- Coordinates: 37.4782°N 126.9330°E
- Operator: South Seoul LRT Co., Ltd.
- Line: Sillim Line
- Platforms: 2
- Tracks: 2

Construction
- Structure type: Underground

History
- Opened: May 28, 2022
Location
- Location within South Korea

Seowon Station is a station on the Sillim Line. It is located in Sillim-dong, Gwanak-gu, Seoul.

== Gallery ==
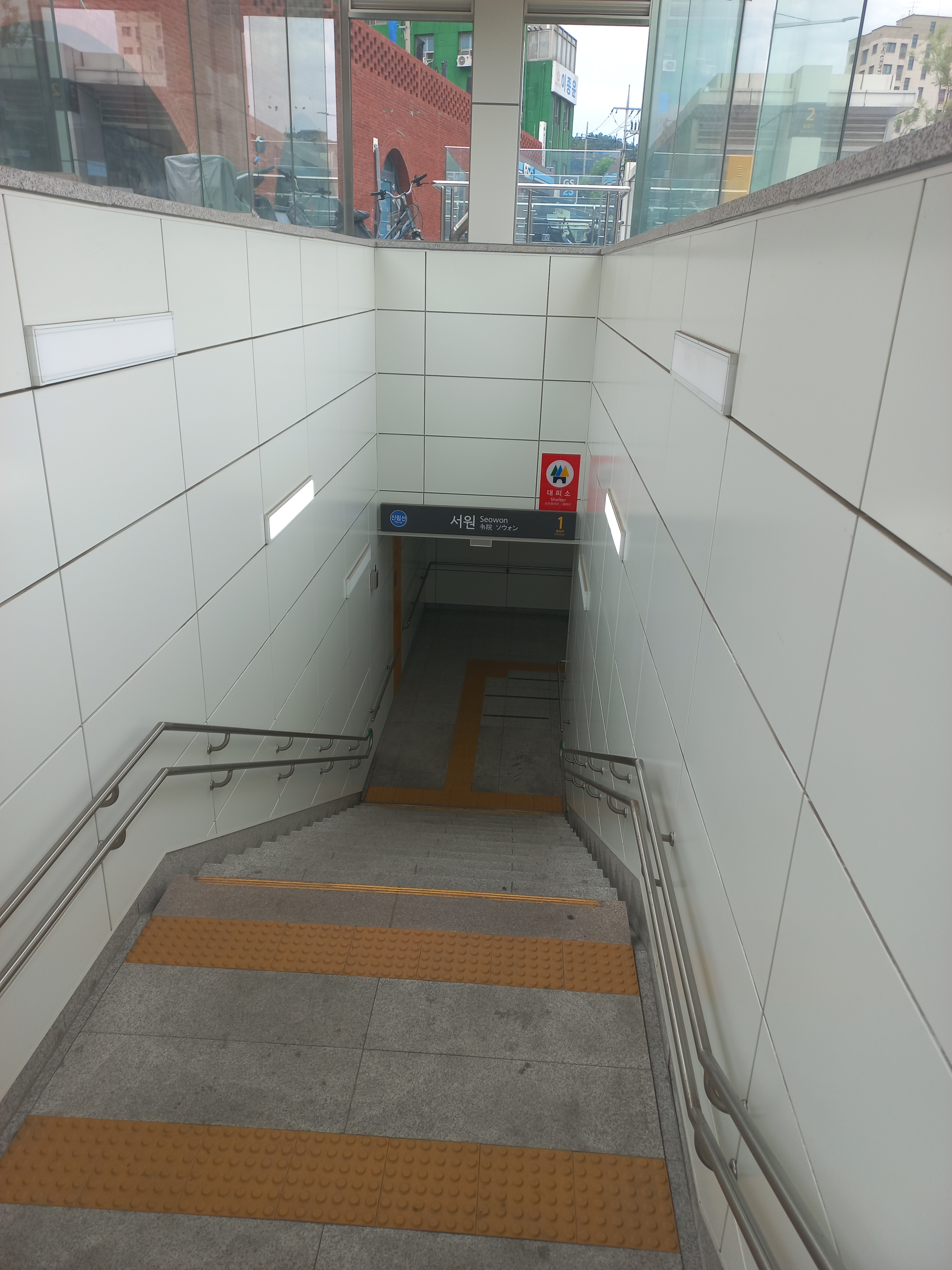
Exit 1

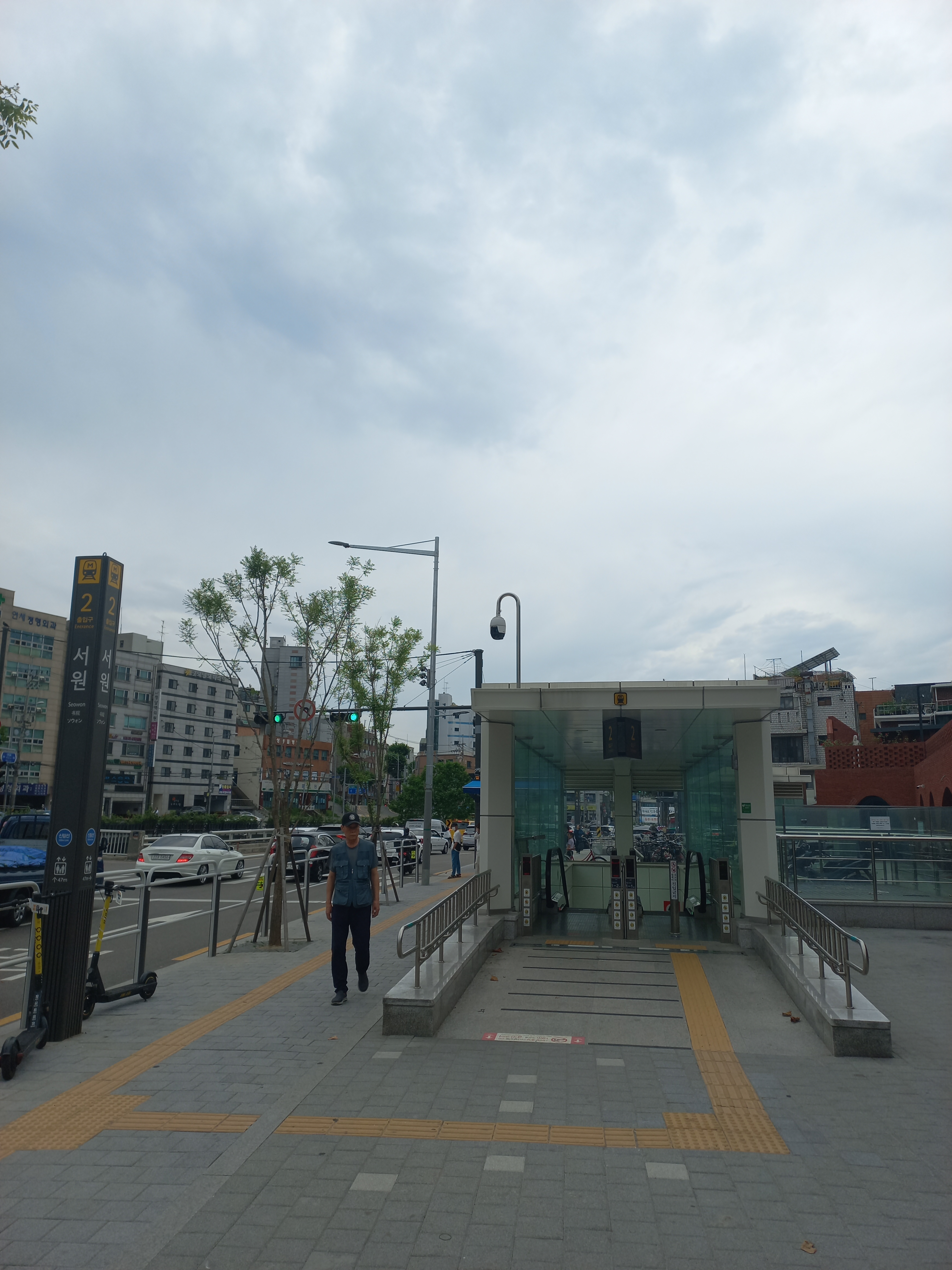
Exit 2

Preceding station	Seoul Metropolitan Subway	Following station
Sillim towards Saetgang	Sillim Line	Seoul National University Venture Town towards Gwanaksan
