= Marronnier Park =

Park in Seoul, South Korea

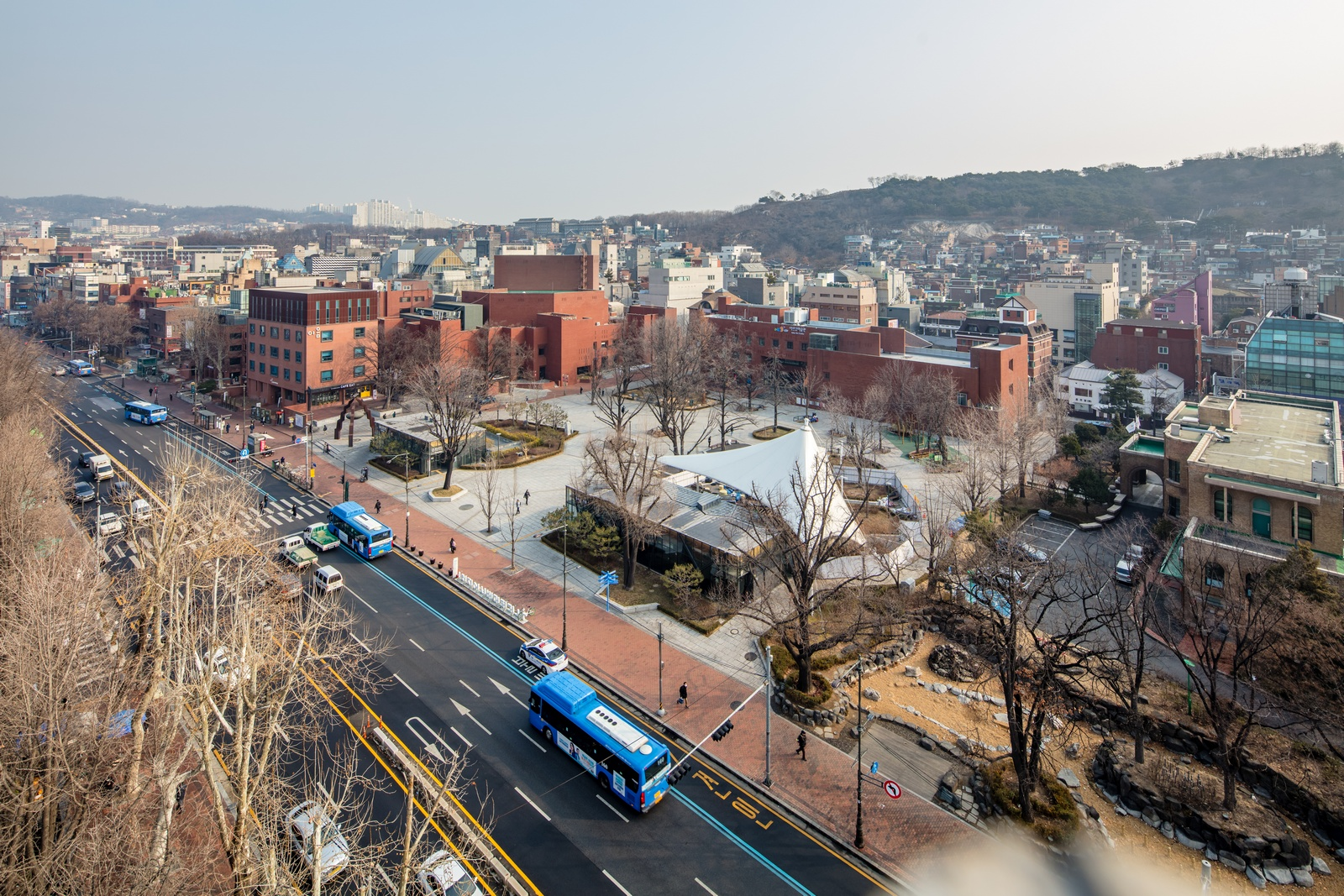
- The park in 2020
- Interactive map of Marronnier Park
- Location: 104, Daehangno, Jongno District, Seoul, South Korea
- Coordinates: 37.580503°N 127.002807°E
- Area: 0.5802 hectares (1.434 acres)
- Established: April 29, 1982

Korean name
- Hangul: 마로니에 공원
- Hanja: 마로니에 公園
- Revised Romanization: Maronie Gongwon
- McCune–Reischauer: Maronie Kongwŏn

Marronnier Park (Korean: 마로니에 공원) is a park in the Daehangno district of Seoul.

The park was designated on April 29, 1982 and is 5,802 square metres (62,450 ft^{2}). At the center of the park is a marronnier tree (Aesculus hippocastanum) planted on April 5, 1929 on the campus of what was then Keijō Imperial University. From May to June, its red and white flowers bloom. The Marronnier tree became the symbolic tree of Daehangno, which literally means “university street”. Seoul National University moved to its Gwanak campus in 1975. Though the park is not very large it forms the center of one of Seoul's major theater districts, Daehangno, and is a popular gathering spot for the city's university students.

Marronnier Park is in Hyehwa-dong, Jongno District, near the number 2 exit of Hyehwa Station on line.
