= Sundae Town =

Food district in Seoul, South Korea

Sundae Town (Korean: 순대마을) is an area of Seoul, South Korea in the Sillim-dong division of the city. Sundae Town is known for a style of South Korean street food called sundae bokkeum and involves stuffing dangmyeon (noodles) and vegetables mixed with pigs blood into sausage-like casings. The 'sausages' are then steamed and have a similar consistency to black pudding or other similar blood sausage products.

Interior of Sillim-dong Sundae Town

The area's origins date from a sundae bokkeum restaurant in Sillim market. The market was replaced in the early 1990s by a shopping center but many restaurants continue the tradition and as of 2019, there were thirty restaurants serving it.
