= Hyehwa station protests =

2018–2019 feminist protests in South Korea

Hyehwa Station Protests
- Part of the feminist movement in South Korea
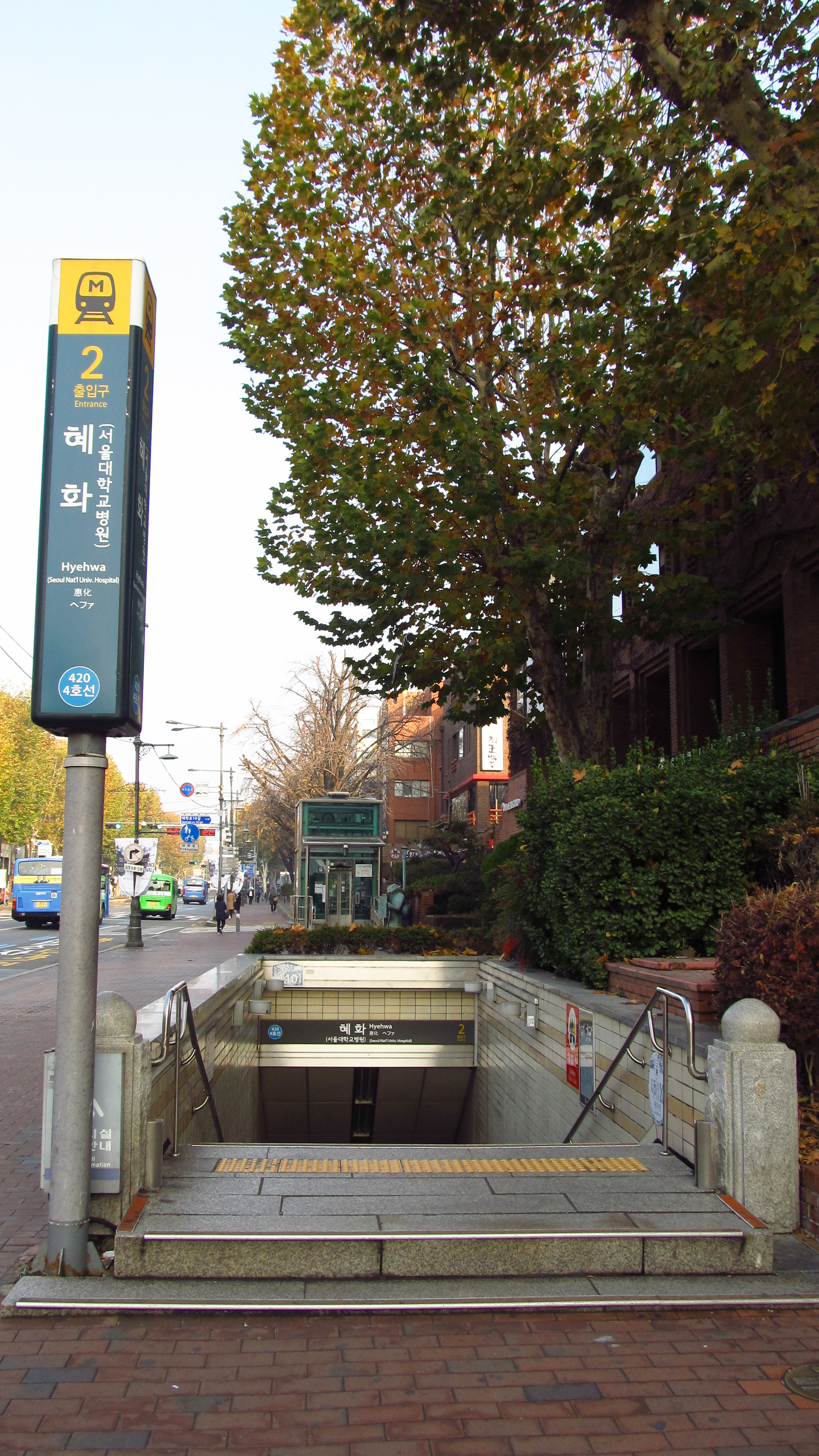
- Hyehwa Station Exit No. 2, where the first protests were held
- Date: May 19, 2018 – October 6, 2018
- Location: Seoul, South Korea
- Caused by: Alleged bias and double standards in the police and judicial systems; Alleged bias in the investigation of a Hongik University sex crime; Molka and voyeurism crimes
- Goals: Initial: Retrial of suspect in the Hongik University incident; Judicial reform and police reform; Later: Resignation of male police commissioner and replacement with female police commissioner; Increased hiring of female police officers; Repeal of South Korean anti-abortion law; Criticism of President Moon Jae-in; Stricter laws against misogyny and sex crimes; Greater attention to feminist causes in South Korea
- Methods: Rallying, picketing
- Status: "Suspended" since 6 October 2018

The Hyehwa station protests were a series of feminist protest rallies held mostly in 2018 at Hyehwa Station in Seoul, South Korea. The protests, which started on 19 May 2018, were against sexism, misogyny, and hidden camera voyeurism (known in South Korea as molka), and aimed to spark reformation of the judiciary system, particularly its handling of sex crimes, which organizers believed favors men. The protests were the largest feminist protests in South Korea, reaching 110,000 demonstrators by December 2018. Not all protests were held at Hyehwa Station; some were also held at Gwanghwamun Plaza. Further protests were held throughout 2019 following other high-profile sex crimes, including the Burning Sun scandal.

The protests were sparked after a woman was arrested for secretly photographing and doxing a male nude model following a dispute between them during a Hongik University art class. Activists alleged the investigation proved there were double standards in the National Police Agency, arguing that police only made a quick investigation and arrest because the victim was a male and the perpetrator was a female. It was discovered that the perpetrator had sent an email to the Womad administrator asking for the destruction of evidence, and later turned herself in, making the arrest fairly quicker.

The protests were met with mixed reception by the South Korean media and public, who mostly agreed with the primary goal of the protests but disagreed with extremist ideas and phrases used by some protesters. Male protesters and reporters were not allowed to attend the protests, which were intended for "biological women" only. Some commentators noted what could be considered reverse sexism from the protesters. Others pointed out that the protests have lost their original purpose of condemning the police's biased investigation and have degenerated into extreme misandry. The Government of South Korea denied the protesters' allegations of bias and double standards in the police and judicial systems. In South Korea, researches have shown that younger men do in fact tend to receive heavier punishments, especially when the victim is a woman. President Moon Jae-in, who was heavily criticized by the protesters for his inaction on feminist causes, also denied bias in the investigative processes.

== Background ==
=== Voyeurism in South Korea ===
"Molka" (Korean: 몰카, Korean pronunciation: [mo(ː)ɭkʰa]) is the Korean term for hidden cameras installed secretly and illegally to capture voyeuristic images and videos. Hidden cameras are often installed in public washrooms or hotel rooms, and typically target women. Molka crimes in South Korea go unreported or undetected, and suspects are often not sentenced. In 2017, more than 5,400 suspects were arrested, but fewer than 2% of cases resulted in prison sentences. In September 2018, government officials announced that 8,000 employees would be assigned to inspect 20,554 public washrooms, after several cases of hidden cameras in toilet stalls were reported. Authorities have warned the public to pay attention to certain locations because of molka crimes. In June 2021, the Human Rights Watch deemed South Korea the number one country in the world for spy cam use and its usage for digital sex crimes.

Voyeurism in general is an issue in South Korea. Some offenders use cameras to take pictures or record videos of women, often in public while following them around. These pictures and videos, like molka images and videos, are often posted online, where it is difficult for victims to remove them, let alone know they are victims. Soranet, a website hosting voyeuristic images, was shut down, and its owner arrested, following a decade-long investigation.

=== Previous protests ===
In 2016, following the murder of a woman at Gangnam Station by a man whose reasoning was his hatred for women, South Korean feminists held the Gangnam Station Post-it Note protest, when people gathered at a station exit to leave flowers and messages written on Post-it Notes expressing their condolences and raising awareness about gender discrimination, misogyny, and gender inequality. The protest continued with rallies, including a march on Sinnonhyeon Station, a subway station adjacent to Gangnam Station. This predated the Hyehwa Station Protest by two years, and was similar in nature.

The #MeToo movement also gained traction around the time of the Hyehwa Station protests.

=== Hongik University incident ===
On 1 May 2018, a male nude model, whose identity remains anonymous, was photographed nude without consent by a female offender at Hongik University. The 25-year-old female offender, surname "Ahn", was also a nude model working with the victim for a life drawing class in a Hongik University lecture room. During a class break, Ahn was involved in a dispute with the victim. Ahn secretly photographed him, and later that day, she uploaded the picture on the radical feminist website Womad. After the picture was uploaded, the victim was doxed and cyberbullied by radical feminists on the site; Ahn promptly disposed of her phone in the Han River, which led to suspicion when she refused to provide her phone to police as evidence. Ahn was arrested two days later and was sentenced to 10 months in prison.

The handling of the incident and Ahn's arrest raised allegations of double standards and gender inequality, as feminist activists alleged police investigators only arrested Ahn so quickly because, unlike most other sexual harassment cases, which are mostly unresolved because of lack of evidence or the difficulty of investigation, the victim was a man and the perpetrator was a woman. Activists pointed to previous incidents, such as the acquittal of a Seoul man for allegedly taking upskirt pictures of a woman in a subway station, as proof that sex crimes investigations are biased in favor of men. It was discovered that the perpetrator had sent an email to the Womad administrator asking for the destruction of evidence, and later confessed, making the arrest fairly quicker. Over 300,000 people signed a petition to the Blue House calling for a new and fair investigation of the case. The incident became the trigger for the protests.

== Protests ==
The rallies were organized by a group, described as many sources as an internet café, reportedly named "Protest to Denounce Biased Investigations into Illegal Photography", "Uncomfortable Courage", "Courage to be Uncomfortable", or "Inconvenient Courage". The group was reportedly formed on Daum on 10 May, with approximately 27,000 members by 20 May. Funds for the protests were collected on an anonymous KakaoTalk chatroom, where people also posted photos of food they bought for the protesters.

The first rally was held on 19 May 2018, when approximately 12,000 women dressed in red gathered near Hyehwa Station exit no. 2 to protest the investigation of the Hongik University incident. Protesters chanted slogans such as "Let's have fair investigations" and "The same punishment for the same crime", and carried signs and placards with slogans such as "My Life is Not Your Porn". Protesters briefly shouted at male passerby taking pictures of them; otherwise, there were no reports of violence during the rally. However, the protesters shouted controversial quotes, such as "With dick, not guilty. Without dick, guilty," as well as holding pickets that mocked the victim of the Hongik University Insident sexually. Interviewees who witnessed the protest responeded "I would be heartbroken if my son grew up to be ridiculed and hated like that just because he's a man. "I happened to pass by a rally and saw a picket sign degrading male genitalia... It made me wonder if that was even allowed." and "I thought it would be more meaningful to participate in an actual rally rather than just talking about feminism online. However, when I saw the photos of the rally preparations posted online, they all seemed to be focused on belittling men rather than advocating for women's rights, so I didn't participate."

The second rally was held on 9 June 2018, using the same tactics as the first protest in May. This time, there were between 15,000 and 22,000 attendees. Additional demands were made, including that the police commissioner step down and that 90% of new police hires be women. A hair-shaving event was held at the rally, to cheers and applause for those who shaved their head. Though men were not allowed at the rally, male supporters attended and chanted slogans alongside the female protesters from the sidelines; one male protester, a 14-year-old boy, told the Korea JoongAng Daily he was attending because he did not want his younger sister to fall victim to sex crimes.

The third rally was held on 7 July 2018, attended by between 18,000 and 66,000 protesters, including some from faraway cities such as Gwangju and Busan. The protesters criticized the then-in effect anti-abortion laws and President Moon Jae-in's response to the protests. Another rally was held in Gwanghwamun Plaza, specifically to abolish the anti-abortion law; there, protesters were advised to wear black "in solidarity with other protests in favor of liberalizing abortion law overseas", but many wore red, having come from the Hyehwa Station rally.

The fourth rally was held on 4 August 2018, attended by approximately 70,000 people. Using their greater numbers, the protesters created a massive line from Hyehwa Station to Gyeongbokgung, made larger by lines of people attempting to enter both locations. Protesters held a mock trial, satirizing actual cases of male suspects being acquitted of major sex crimes, such as a case involving a man who allegedly uploaded 3,000 terabytes of women taken with a hidden camera to a website. The rally was held during a heat wave in Seoul; the protesters noted this on some signs, some reading "Our Rage Is Hotter Than The Heat Wave".

The fifth rally was held on 6 October 2018, attended by between 6,000 and 60,000 protesters and focusing on recent acquittals of male suspects in sex crimes cases, including Ahn Hee-jung who, at the time, had just been acquitted of an alleged sexual assault. In Ahn's case, the court ruled that there was little evidence to prove the allegations made against Ahn, and that there were inconsistencies in the victim's story; activists argued that this was because the victim did not "behave like a victim" by societal standards. Protesters demanded the passing of 132 laws against misogyny that would heavily punish sex crimes. Protesters sent National Assembly members Moon Hee-sang and Yeo Sang-kyoo text messages urging them to pass the laws. The rally ended with a showing of molka videos uploaded online. During the rally, a man armed with a BB gun fired at least ten shots at the protesters in an attempt to disrupt the rally. The suspect, a Seoul college student in his 20s, was quickly apprehended by police. No injuries were reported.

The sixth and final rally was held on 22 December 2018 at Gwanghwamun Plaza. Attended by up to 110,000 participants, it was the largest feminist protest in South Korean history. The aim of the sixth rally was the same as the fifth, focusing on passing stricter laws against misogyny and sex crimes; text messages were again sent to members of the National Assembly, "ordering" them to pass the laws. The organizers announced the sixth rally would be the last Hyehwa Station protest organized by them, citing backlash received by conservative and progressive men alike, and stating that they would devise ways to ensure their agenda could not be engulfed by the backlash.

A seventh smaller rally at Hyehwa Station was held on 2 March 2019. Attended by around 700 people, the rally focused on the Burning Sun scandal. Protesters demanded the closure of the club and the arrest of those connected to the club, including club officials and police officers allegedly connected to the club. KBS News reported that, like the previous rallies, men and male reporters were not allowed to join or take pictures. A small counter-protest attended by around 50 men was held across the street, but no major incidents between the protests were reported.

== Responses ==
=== Government ===
President Moon Jae-in denied allegations of bias in the police investigation process. He rejected the claims of protesters, saying, "In the case of male perpetrators, the rate of arrest and severe punishment was higher. In the case of female perpetrators, it was generally treated lightly. This is common sense." In South Korea, younger men do in fact tend to receive heavier punishments, especially when the victim is a woman. Moon was heavily criticized by the protesters, who campaigned on the promise that he would be a "feminist president"; protesters said he had gone back on those promises and was refusing to listen to their concerns.

Ministry of Gender Equality and Family Minister Chung Hyun-back stated on 16 May 2018 that she would discuss concerns with the Hongik University investigation with police officials. Chung visited the third rally on July 7 to voice her support for them and better understand their concerns.

Police were deployed to secure the protests and prevent clashes between protesters, passerby, and police. A large number of female officers were assigned to the protests compared to male officers; a police detective told reporters this was to ensure there were no misunderstandings between protesters and police.

=== Media ===
The media coverage of the Hyehwa Station Protest differed in perspectives. Many people in South Korea shorten the word feminist as "femi" (페미). In some cases, the definition of feminism in South Korea is often interpreted as radical feminism.

Some South Korean news coverage mentioned the Hyehwa Station Protest's criticism of President Moon Jae-in, noting that some demonstrations involved caricatures of Jae-in. Hankook Ilbo noted that the original intent of the protests strayed from calling for fair investigations and anti-sexism, to much more radical ideas that disillusioned some protesters, and opined that the tolerance of extreme ideas at the protests would likely deter the protesters from reaching their goals.

Tension occurred between media and protesters due to the exclusion of men and male reporters from the protests. Activists specifically asked men to not attend the protests, regardless of their sympathies. Male reporters were restricted from asking questions and were forced to wait behind police lines.

=== Public ===
The BBC interviewed the public for their reactions to the protest. A middle aged woman said that, having a daughter and a son, she was unsure how to feel. A man who had been following the protests since the first day agreed with the protesters and believed the protests were necessary, but also advised they should be cautious with their strategy and actions. A teenager questioned the generally positive reporting of the protests by the media contrasting with the extreme positions taken by the protesters, and argued that continuing in that direction would "cause problems for society". Not all perspectives questioned the protesters: a businesswoman interviewed by The Korea Herald agreed with the protesters and hoped the police would devise a proper plan for unbiased investigations going forward.

== Controversy ==
Controversy arose over the slogans used by protesters, interpreted by many as misandry. For example, at the third rally, the phrase "Policemen are men-sects too" was chanted, referring to men as insects. The organizers of the rally told reporters they were "mirroring the language used by men against women" and that their movement was not intended to be against men. Controversy also arose over the phrase "do a Jae-gi" used by some protesters, referring to Sung Jae-gi, a men's rights activist who committed suicide by jumping off a bridge on 26 July 2013. Many of the instances of the phrase at the protests were directed toward President Moon.

== See also ==
- Feminism in South Korea
