= Jangchungdan Park =

Park in Seoul, South Korea

Coordinates: 37°33′28″N 127°00′16″E

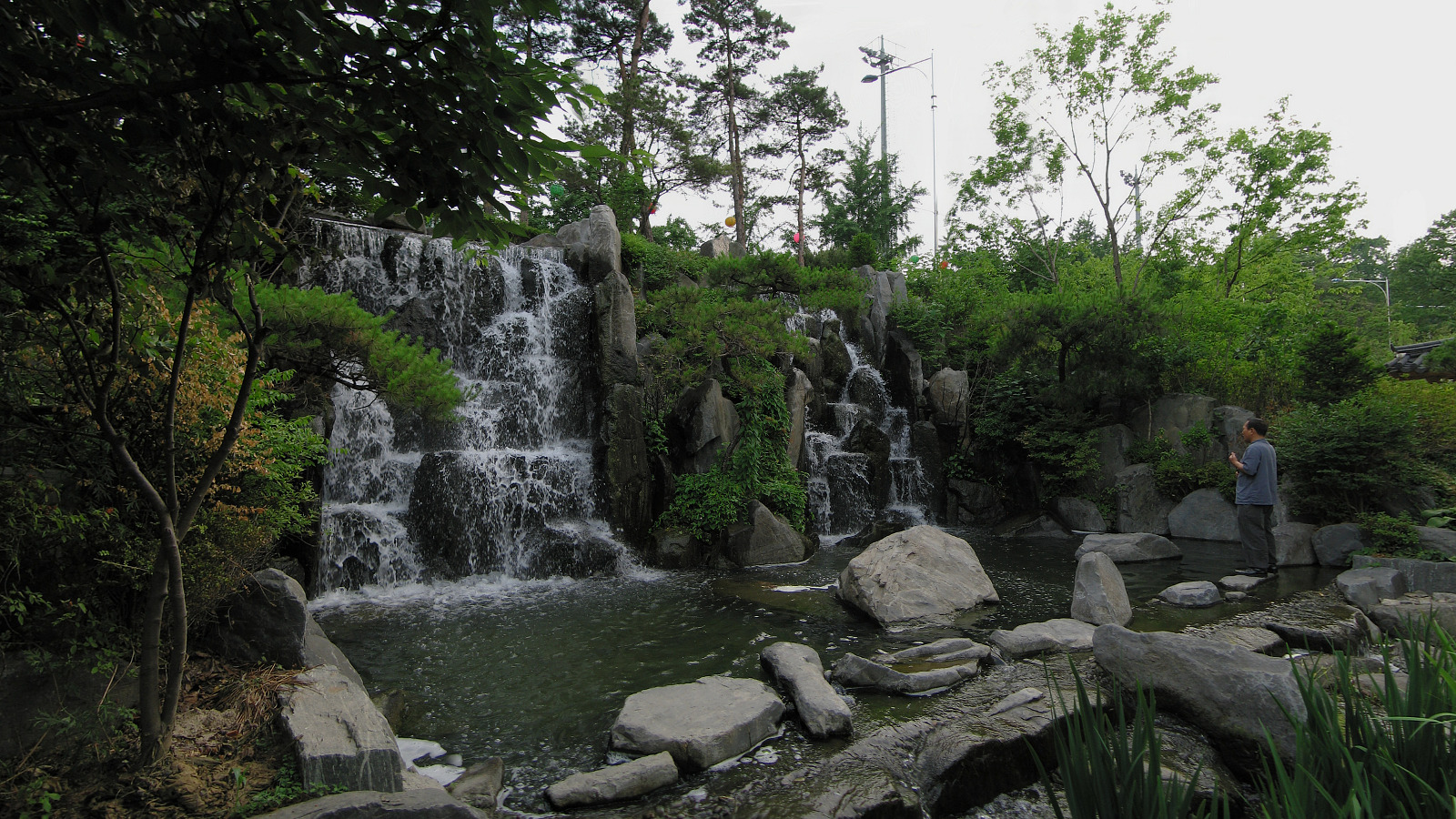
- A waterfall in the park (2012)
- Interactive map of Jangchungdan Park
- Location: 261, Dongho-ro, Jung District, Seoul
- Area: 297 square kilometres (29,700 ha)
- Established: 1919

Korean name
- Hangul: 장충단 공원
- Hanja: 奬忠壇公園
- RR: Jangchungdan gongwon
- MR: Changch'ungdan kongwŏn

Jangchungdan Park (Korean: 장충단 공원) is a park located in Jung District, Seoul, South Korea. It is to the northeast of the mountain Namsan.

It contains the historic Dangchungdan Shrine, which was built by Emperor Gojong in 1900 to memorialize Empress Myeongseong. The park has a children's baseball field, a tennis court, and a swimming pool. It is popular for walks and for exercise. It has a pine tree forest, with walking trails through it.

== History ==
After the 1895 assassination of Empress Myeongseong, her husband Emperor Gojong built the Jangchungdan Shrine as a memorial to her in November 1900 in this area. Around the time, the area was known just as "Jangchungdan".

=== Japanese colonial period ===
It became a park in 1919, during the Japanese colonial period. After the 1932 January 28 incident (a conflict between Japan and China), a statue was erected dedicated to Japanese soldiers who died during it. The statue was quickly torn down just after Korea was liberated in 1945.

=== Post-liberation ===
The shrine was destroyed during the Korean War, although it was eventually rebuilt.

In 1959, the historic bridge Supyogyo, which had stood over the stream Cheonggyecheon since 1420, was dismantled and moved to this park. A device used to measure the water level (수표; supyo) was also moved to the park. Both have since been designated Tangible Cultural Heritages of Seoul (No. 18 and 838 respectively).

In 1964, a bronze statue of Yi Tjoune was erected in the park, and a statue of Yujeong in 1968. The rebuilt monument was designated a Tangible Cultural Heritage of Seoul in 1969.

On September 22, 1984, the park, which had an area of 418,000 square metres (4,500,000 sq ft) since 1940, had a portion of it merged into Namsan Park. Its new area was 297,000 m^{2} (3,200,000 sq ft).

There are now a number of other monuments in the park that commemorate the March First Movement, the Korean independence movement, independence activist Yu Gwan-sun and Buddhist reformer Han Yong-un.

Between February and April 2022, the Seoul Museum of History ran an exhibition about the history of the park.

== Gallery ==
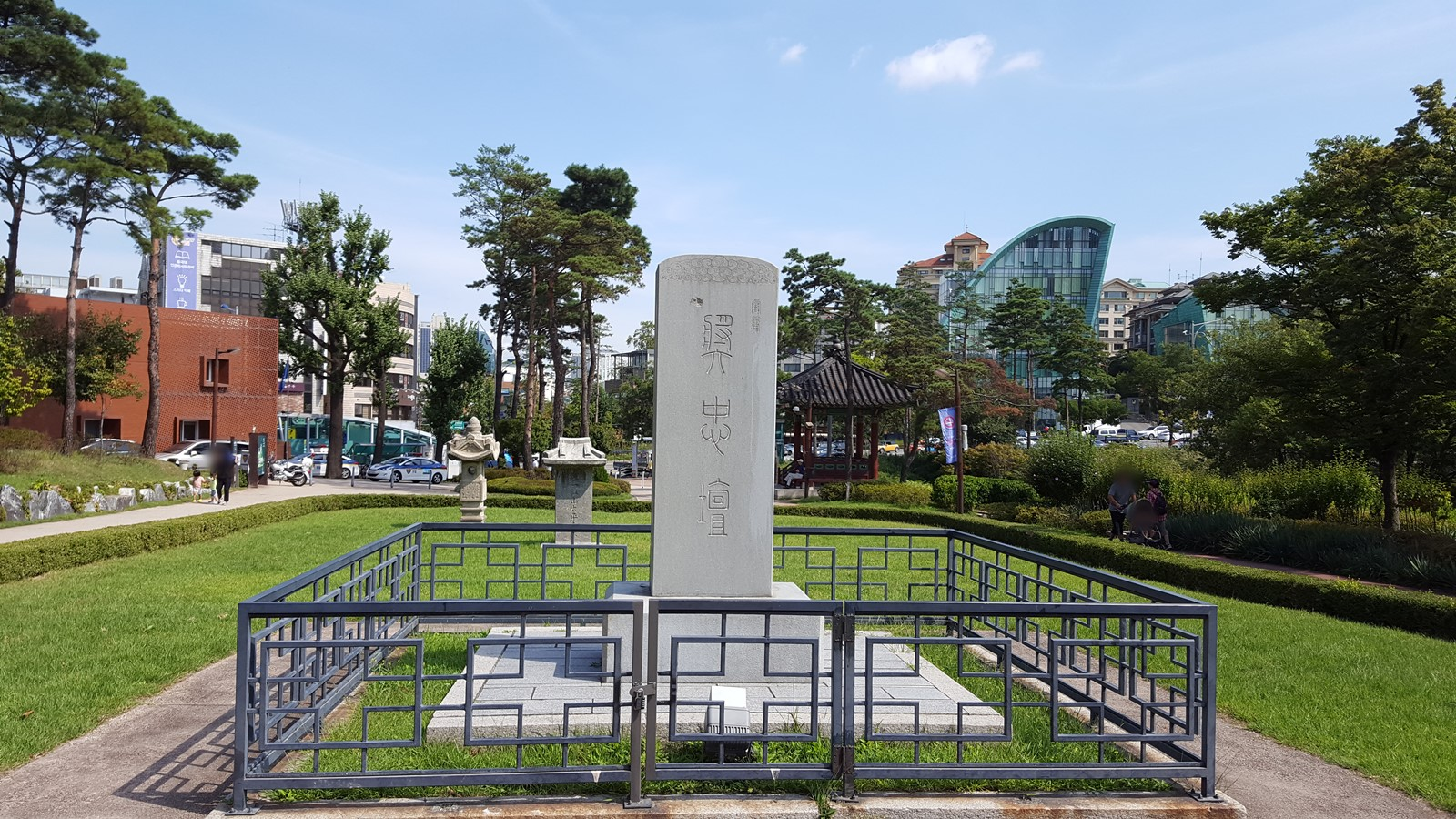
The Jangchungdan Shrine, dedicated to the Empress (2016)

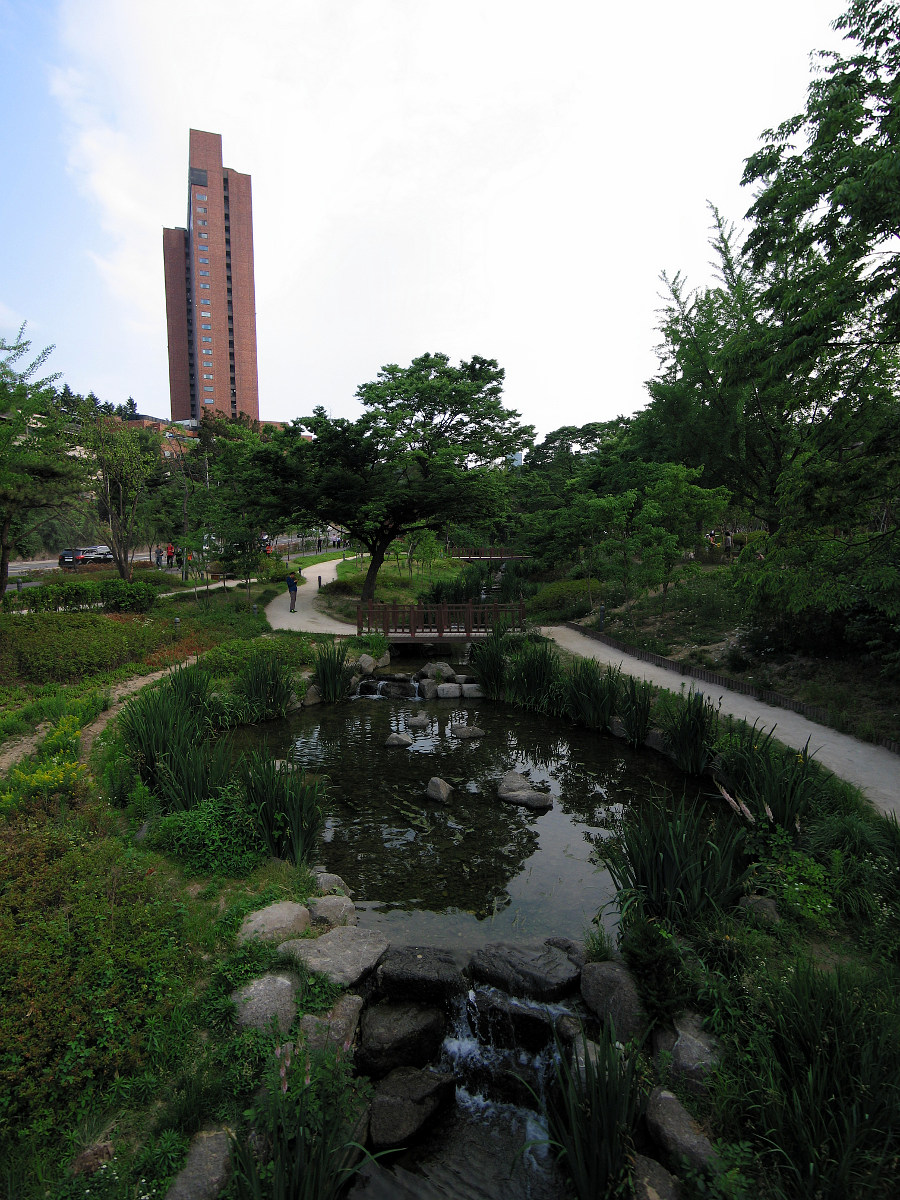
Walking paths in the park (2012)

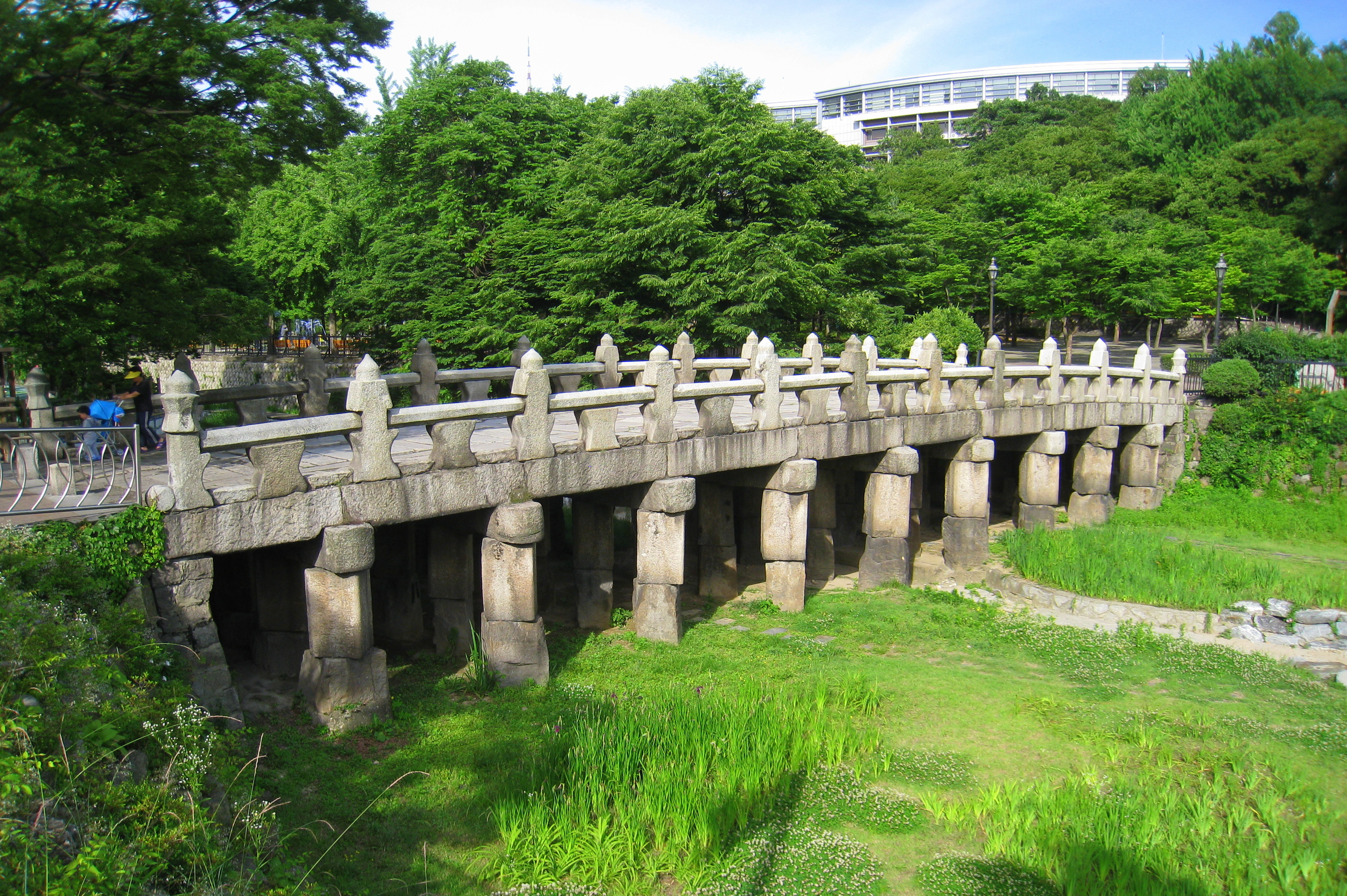
The bridge Supyogyo, relocated from Cheonggyecheon (2008)

== See also ==
- Hyochang Park: another historic park in Seoul with monuments to the independence movement
