= Ssangnim-dong =

Neighbourhood in Seoul, South Korea

- Country: South Korea

Korean name
- Hangul: 쌍림동
- Hanja: 雙林洞
- RR: Ssangnim-dong
- MR: Ssangnim-dong

Ssangnim-dong (Korean: 쌍림동) is a legal dong (neighbourhood) of Jung District, Seoul, South Korea. It is administered by its administrative dong, Gwanghui-dong.

The headquarters of South Korean food company CJ Cheil Jedang is located in the CJ Cheiljedang Building near the Dongdaemun History & Culture Park Station.

== See also ==
- Administrative divisions of South Korea
