= Molka =

South Korean sex crime

Molka (Korean: 몰카, pronounced [mo(ː)ɭkʰa]) is the Korean term for hidden cameras or miniature spy cameras secretly and illegally installed, often in order to capture voyeuristic images and videos. Molka is an abbreviation of mollae-kamera (몰래카메라), which means "sneaky camera". The expression originated from the homonymous title of a Korean prank TV show, which existed from March 1991 to November 1992. This makes the term denote prank and spy camera at the same time.

'Molka' can refer to both the actual cameras as well as the footage later posted online. Molka crimes have become a prominent point of feminist protest and #MeToo in South Korea.

== Background ==
The associated problems with molka have led South Korean cell phone manufacturers to be required to have phones emit loud shutter noises upon taking a picture. More recently, the term molka has become associated with smaller, fixed spycams. Fixed spycams have been found in public areas in South Korea as early as 1997, where secret cameras were found to be installed in the ceiling of a Sinchon department store's women's restroom. While the department store stated that the cameras were installed for 'security purposes' to catch thieves and people who threw trash down toilets, the incident received much public criticism.

With the increase in smartphone ownership and rapid development of technology, molka crimes have also been increasingly found in spaces such as public bathrooms, changing rooms, schools, and offices. Molka crimes have been called a product of fast, easy access to internet technology and "backwards" misogyny, or an example of "digital male sexual violence". According to police data, around 1,100 to 1,400 alleged molka crimes were reported to the police in 2010 and 2011 respectively, but in 2018, there were 6,800 reports. Revenge porn, or private photos and footage taken and circulated by former lovers or partners without consent of the filmed subject, is a related form of harassment thought to be roughly as widespread a problem in South Korea.

=== Public bathroom molka crimes ===
Public bathrooms are one of the most commonly mentioned locations for spycam installation. Many women have said that they do not feel safe using public bathrooms because there is such a high possibility of there being a hidden camera. Many accounts of women break cameras with pens, cover up holes and cracks in walls, toilet paper holders, and hairdryers where cameras might be hidden for their and peer women's safety.

In September 2018, the Seoul Metropolitan Government announced it would increase public bathroom inspection by assigning 8,000 employees to inspect the city's 20,000+ bathrooms on a daily basis, a step up from the previous 50 employees and monthly inspections. However, government inspectors have not actually discovered any recording devices in public restrooms since at least 2016. Another problem is that according to police, many spy cameras are only installed for short periods of time—as brief as 15 minutes—and therefore can be difficult to detect even with the implementation of daily searches.

=== Motel molka crimes ===
Molka has also been found to be secretly installed in motel rooms, and the content of the recorded films is explicitly sexual rather than capturing women's bodies alone. Since couples are involved, motel molka crimes may also position many men as victims, in contrast to most other molka positions which of main victim's are women. The perpetrator may check into a motel and install cameras in places such as hairdryer holders and satellite boxes.

A particularly widespread incident was discovered in March 2019. Over three months, more than 800 couples had been live-streamed having sex in 30 love motels across 10 cities in South Korea. The videos, posted online and accessible for a monthly subscription fee, were hosted on an overseas server so that the cameras' IP addresses would be harder to detect. The two men in charge of the scheme were arrested, and two other men were suspected to be accomplices.

The Burning Sun scandal revealed a high-profile case of molka circulation, where celebrities such as Jung Joonyoung were found to have filmed or shared explicit sexual videos in a private chat room, many of which were filmed in motel rooms and involved with prostitution rings. This gave an example of how the issue is connected to other gendered violence and the common complacency of law enforcement towards or active concealment of crimes and violence towards women. The scandal has also fueled more discussion about the issues of illegal filming, prostitution, distribution of illegally filmed molka pornography, and sexual violence against women, among others.

== Social reaction ==
There have been various reactions to the increased prevalence of molka crimes, including increased discussion and more physical demonstrations regarding the issue.

'Molka' ranked a third place in South Korea's most Tweeted social issues in 2018, outranked only after by #SchoolMeToo and 'feminism' for first and second ranks respectively. All of these issues relate to the uneven sexual violence that women face. In May 2018, President Moon Jae-in supported greater punishment for offenders, stating that it had become a "part of daily life".

However, many people treat molka incidents and other forms of gendered violence as isolated incidents or as the response of extreme individuals, rather than a part of systemic misogyny and a culture of indifference toward sexual violence against women.

Monthly protests against spy cameras from May to October 2018 in Seoul were in part catalyzed by one molka incident where the perpetrator was a woman who secretly filmed a nude male model. The investigation and punishment were conducted rapidly and harshly in comparison to most molka crime cases where nearly 98% of perpetrators are male, and the police's response to the rare case of a female perpetrator and male victim angered many women. Protest campaigns included removal of spycams, harsher punishments for perpetrators, and greater regulations around the sale of spycam equipment. "My life is not your porn" became a slogan popularized in the protest as a response to the prevalence of spy cameras installed in everyday places. The August protest condemning spy cameras particularly shattered records of protest numbers, reportedly drawing up to between 55,000 and 70,000 female participants according to organizers and becoming the largest women-only demonstration in South Korean history.

A computer specialist who works to delete molka footage said that the protests drew enough attention to the issue of molka crimes that her company saw a surge in demand for its services.

In response to this controversy, the police denied that the reason of being able to quickly arrest the perpetrator was not the perpetrator's gender. The police reported the information that the perpetrator was in a specific classroom at a university where only a few people gathered was easy to identify the perpetrator

== Legal policy ==
=== Legal limitations of molka crimes ===
Article 14 of the "Act on Special Cases Concerning the Punishment, etc. of Sexual Crimes" lists taking or distributing unauthorized pictures or videos as a crime. While hidden camera filming is technically a crime, the law remains vague enough that most molka filming incidents can easily be privatized and classified as within the scope of normativity. Most molka films are not readily classified as 'illegal violence' if cameras are not specifically zoomed in to particular body parts or directly placed in garments. For example, even if a victim states that they felt 'sexual humiliation,' a voyeuristic view of a woman using a public restroom may not be considered as illegal sexual violence. Police have also let offenders go in molka crimes where there was a lack of physical violence.

There is also not much legal structure in place to address molka footage circulation even if perpetrators have been found guilty. The rapid development of digital technology and the digital permanence of circulation of illegal molka content makes it difficult for a victim to recover damages even with proof of wrongdoing.

=== Current legal repercussions for molka crimes ===
Molka crimes can result in jail time or fines. The filming or distribution of intimate videos—including if the subject consents to being filmed but does not consent to distribution of said video—can result in up to five years in prison or a fine of up to 30 million won (about 26,500 USD). However, as of 2017, nearly 80 percent of fines actually implemented are less than 3 million won, and also nearly 80 percent of given fines are imposed on the suspect who distributed the footage rather than those who install and initially film from spy cameras. The amount of the fines implemented is also inadequate when considering the funds required to remove molka videos from online circulation even for one month.

Many women's groups refer to the lack of harsh punishment as a "slap on the wrist" for men and say that it demonstrates the lack of urgency authorities in current state for molka crimes. A study by the Korean Women Lawyers Association found that in 2016, the rate of prosecution amongst those accused of committing molka crimes was only 31.5%. Of those tried for molka crime offenses from 2012 to 2017, only 8.7 percent received a jail sentence. In 2017, more than 5,400 people were arrested for spycam-related crimes in South Korea, but fewer than 2 percent were ultimately jailed.

Statistics on cyber sex and digital sex crimes are not extensive enough to provide significant insight on the actual problems of victims and related trends of digital sex crime in Korean society, and the voices of victims and survivors do not have much weight in current official policy discussion. As a result, there is not substantial information that can be used as a basis to create effective policy and measures against these crimes as well as policies to protect victims of digital sexual violence.

In 2017, an omnibus policy on digital sex crimes titled "Comprehensive Policies on the Prevention of Sex Crimes and Victimization" was passed. The act emphasizes strict investigation and punishment of sex crimes as well as establishment of support for victims and greater public education regarding sex crimes. However, the continued growth of molka crimes and lack of effective conviction following the creation of the policy shows a gap between the written law and its practical implementation.

In a situational analysis based on data and periodic reports from the Korean National Police Agency, the Korean Women Lawyers Association, the Ministry of Gender Equality and Family, and many others, published in October 2019, it was found that despite protests against spy cameras in South Korea, and petitions signed calling to ban the use of spy cameras in 2018, the issue of spy cameras remains a pressing matter in South Korea.

== Differences in the scope of punishment from other countries ==
There is an evaluation that South Korea has a broader scope of punishment for taking creepshots as a sexual offence.

According to a lawyer in South Korea, none of the United States, the United Kingdom, France, Germany or Japan punish the taking of creepshots of women in public places wearing revealing clothing or body-conforming outfits (e.g., swimsuits, leggings, skinny jeans, hot pants, etc.) as a sexual crime unlike in South Korea, if it is not upskirting. He said that South Korea has a wider range of punishment for types of secret filming as a sexual offence. He said that in South Korea, not only upskirting but also cases that are not upskirting are subject to punishment.

Actually, in South Korea, taking creepshots of women in public places wearing such revealing clothing or outfits that expose their body lines is punishable by law as a sexual crime. Even taking pictures of legs or thighs (not upskirting) without consent can be subject to punishment as a sexual crime. In contrast to this, for example, according to the 18 U.S. Code § 1801 of the United States and the Voyeurism (Offences) Act 2019 in the United Kingdom, the scope of taking creepshots subject to punishment is primarily limited to filming of a nude body, genitals, underwear, or body parts normally covered by clothing and not visible in a private space (or where there is a reasonable expectation of privacy), or upskirting in a public place.

According to local police, of those caught filming others at Haeundae Beach in 2012–2014, the majority were foreigners (58 of 63). The police explained that they come from countries where hidden cameras are not illegal, except some who come from "Muslim countries". Also in 2021, a foreigner who secretly filmed a woman dressed as a Playboy Bunny (bunny suit) in Itaewon during Halloween was referred to the prosecution on charges of a sexual crime.

Filming a clothed person from a long distance can also be punished as a sexual crime in South Korea. When a person is photographed from a long distance, the court judges whether there is "sexual intent", or whether the act cause "sexual shame". The law has been criticised for lacking clear standards for legal interpretation. In 2021, in a case involving the secret filming of a woman in leggings, the Supreme Court of Korea broadly interpreted the scope of "sexual shame" and ruled guilt, stating that even mere unpleasantness can be construed as sexual shame. The South Korean women's community expressed its welcoming stance on this decision.

== See also ==
- Pornography in South Korea
- Revenge porn
