= Sillim-dong =

Neighbourhood in Seoul, South Korea

Coordinates: 37.4874°N 126.9271°E

- Sillim-dong Sundae Town
- Interactive map of Sillim-dong
- Country: South Korea

Area
  - Total: 18.13 km^{2} (7.00 sq mi)

Population (2001)
  - Total: 289,823
  - Density: 15,985.82/km^{2} (41,403.1/sq mi)

Korean name
- Hangul: 신림동
- Hanja: 新林洞
- RR: Sillim-dong
- MR: Sillim-dong

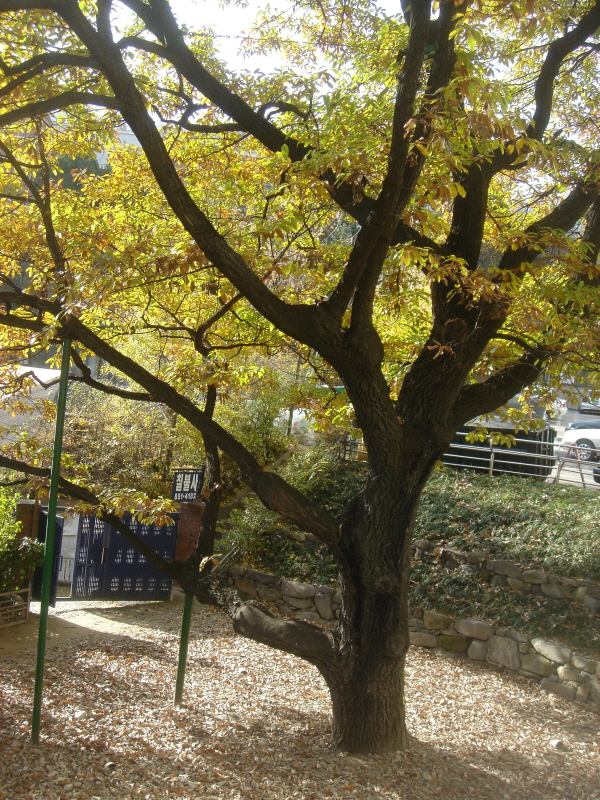
Quercus variabilis (natural monument 271, Sillim-dong

Sillim-dong (Korean: 신림동) is a dong (neighborhood) of Gwanak District, Seoul, South Korea. Seoul National University and Nokdu Street are located in the town. Its name means "new forest", which was derived from the woods outstretched from Mt. Gwanak. It consists of 11 administrative neighbourhoods.

In a survey conducted in 2011 by the Ministry of Land, Transport and Maritime Affairs on 92 Administrative divisions across the country, it reported that the bus stops in Sillim-dong are among the busiest in the country.

It is home to natural monument 271 of South Korea, a cork oak tree (Quercus variabilis).

== Administrative divisions ==
As of September 2008, there are 11 administrative neighborhoods (dong) in Sillim.

| Name | Hangul | Hanja |
|---|---|---|
| Seowon | 서원 | 書院 |
| Sinwon | 신원 | 新源 |
| Seorim | 서림 | 西林 |
| Nangok | 난곡 | 蘭谷 |
| Sinsa | 신사 | 新士 |
| Sillim | 신림 | 新林 |
| Samseong | 삼성 | 三聖 |
| Nanhyang | 난향 | 蘭香 |
| Jowon | 조원 | 棗園 |
| Daehak | 대학 | 大學 |
| Miseong | 미성 | 美星 |

== Attractions ==
- Seoul National University
  - Kyujanggak Archives
  - Seoul National University Museum of Art
- Horim Museum
- Sundae Town

== Traffic ==
- Sillim Station
- Street Nambu, Street Sillim

== In popular culture ==
It is the home of Kim Young-mi (Player 095) in Squid Game (season 2).

== See also ==
- Administrative divisions of South Korea
