= Feminism in China =

Feminism in China refers to the collection of historical movements and ideologies in time aimed at redefining the role and status of women in China. Feminism in China began in the 20th century in tandem with the 1911 Revolution. Feminism in the People's Republic of China (PRC) is closely linked with socialism and class issues. Some commentators believe that this close association is damaging to Chinese feminism and argue that the interests of the Chinese Communist Party (CCP) are placed before those of women. Under Xi Jinping's general secretaryship, feminists have been subject to increased scrutiny by the country's system of mass surveillance and censorship, and detained in some instances.

== Etymology ==
Historically common formulations in Chinese discourse on women's issues have included "women's rights," "equality between men and women," and "women's liberation."

=== Translating Feminism in the 1990s ===
In 1989, seven overseas Chinese scholars formed The Chinese Scholars for Women's Studies (CSWS), a feminist network that aimed to promote Chinese women's and gender studies. In 1994 and 1997, the network translated two western feminist theory publications into Chinese, and thus provided for the Chinese academic community the first peer-reviewed translations of the concept of feminism. In their 1994 collaboration, feminism was translated as Nü Xing Zhu Yi. In 1997, as most CSWS members began using emails, the network had an extensive online debate as to whether feminism should not be translated as Nü Xing Zhu Yi but Nü Quan Zhu Yi.

==== Feminism as Nü Xing Zhu Yi (女性主义) ====
Beginning in the 1980s, native Chinese academics started using Nü Xing Zhu Yi as the Chinese counterpart of feminism. The emphasis of this translation is on the first two characters Nü Xing (女性), which coupled with Zhu Yi (主义) emanates a more academic tone. Nü Xing in its own right also denotes "women". The term thus appeared fitting to then Chinese academics whose scholarly focus centered around women's issues instead of more relational concepts such as "gender" which concerns not only women but all gender subjects and their relations.

==== Feminism as Nü Quan Zhu Yi (女权主义) ====
The emphasis of translating feminism as Nü Quan Zhu Yi is on the second character Quan (权), meaning rights in English. The proponents of this translation highlights the political contingency of feminism as a rights-based social movement. Some CSWS members supported this translation because they felt the other candidate Nü Xing Zhu Yi was depoliticising in its absence of any rights-based connotations. Nü Quan Zhu Yi, which accentuates human rights, was also less essentialist and more encompassing as compared with Nü Xing Zhu Yi, whose first two characters delimit the term as seemingly exclusive to the concerns of women.

== History ==
=== Before 1900 ===
The huge change in the status of women in China before the 1900s occurred in the Han dynasty. In the early matrilineal society, Chinese women had a completely different social status from that after the Han dynasty, women were able to retain their surnames and even pass them on to their children. From Han dynasty to Qing dynasty, Chinese women under the patriarchal system were severely oppressed due to the profound influence of Confucianism and filial piety. During this period, literature about women emerged in China, such as "Mother of Mencius", "The Analects of Women", etc., explaining to women at the time how to be ethical and popularizing the best way of serving parents, husbands and sons in a woman's life. Prior to the 20th century, women in China were considered essentially different from men. Despite the association of women with yin and men with yang, two qualities considered equally important by Daoism, women were believed to occupy a lower position than men in the hierarchical order of the universe. The I Ching stated that "'Great Righteousness is shown in that man and woman occupy their correct places; the relative positions of Heaven and Earth.'" Women were to be submissive and obedient to men, and normally not allowed to participate in government, military or community institutions. While there were lauded exceptions in Chinese history and literature, such as the Song dynasty general Liang Hongyu and legendary woman warrior Hua Mulan, these were considered to be signs of the dire situation of China at the time. Before the 20th century, such exceptional women were believed to have fought to defend China's traditional patriarchal order and society, not to change it.

=== 20th century ===
==== 1900–1949 ====
In the late 19th and 20th centuries, China experienced military and political crises at home and abroad. The Opium Wars of 1839–1842 and 1856–1860 forced China to open trade to other countries, which brought foreign ideologies. A large number of political conflicts forced educated men and women in exile to start revolutionary movements. They started to speak out against these conditions in the late 19th and early 20th centuries, but to little avail. Before that, influential Chinese thinkers, such as Liang Qichao and others, called for the liberation of women, better acceptance of women's education, and women's participation in the country's construction. From the perspective of changing the fate of a country, Liang Qichao claimed that the education of women and the liberation of women are necessary, and that they are also essential to the health of the country.

It was also during these early years of feminism in China that the New Woman movement emerged in their infancy stage promoting ideas of education for women, gender equality, and freedom from constrictive Confucian practices. In the 20th century, women writers also expressed feminism through literary writing. The situation only began to change as result of the Xinhai Revolution in 1911. In course of this widespread uprising against the ruling Qing dynasty, several women rebel units were raised such as Wu Shuqing's Women's Revolutionary Army, Yin Weijun and Lin Zongxue's Zhejiang Women's Army, Tang Qunying's Women's Northern Expedition Brigade, and many others. All these units were disbanded by the Provisional Government of the Republic of China on 26 February 1912, mostly for chauvinistic reasons. Nevertheless, the fact that they had fought alongside men encouraged many of the women who had taken part in the women militias to become politically active, striving for change.

Many changes in women's lives took place during the Republic of China (1912–1949). In 1912 the Women's Suffrage Alliance, an umbrella organization of many local women's organizations, was founded to work for the inclusion of women's equal rights and suffrage in the constitution of the new republic after the abolition of the monarchy, and while the effort was not successful, it signified an important period of feminism activism. A generation of educated and professional new women emerged after the inclusion of girls in the state school system and after women students were accepted at the University of Beijing in 1920, and in the 1931 Civil Code, women were given equal inheritance rights, banned forced marriage and gave women the right to control their own money and initiate divorce.

As part of Chiang Kai-shek's New Life Movement, women were called to return to the home as virtuous wives and good mothers. The Movement's emphasis on women in the home was in part influenced by Nazi Germany and Fascist Italy's restraints on women's employment. The example of Nora Helmer from Henrik Ibsen's play A Doll's House was a theme in progressive intellectuals' opposition to the New Life Movement. When the actress who played Nora in one leftist theatre troupe's production was fired from the school where she worked, the retaliatory firing became known as the "Nora incident" and was discussed in the media and intellectual circles.

No nationally unified women's movement could organize until China was unified under the Kuomintang Government in Nanjing in 1928; women's suffrage was finally included in the new Constitution of 1936, although the constitution was not implemented until 1947.

In 1922, birth control activist Margaret Sanger traveled to China. Her visit fueled the belief among elites in Nationalist-era China that the use of contraception would improve the "quality" of the Chinese people and resulted in many newspaper articles addressing the benefits and shortcomings of birth control. Chinese feminists inspired by Sanger's visit went on to be significantly involved in the subsequent Chinese debates on birth control and eugenics.

In Republican-era China, Chinese feminists did not universally demand legalization of abortion in China. In the view of some feminists, social conservatives' powerful opposition to abortion de-criminalization would result in a backlash that would harm other efforts to improve women's status in relation to men. Accordingly, in a tactical bid for broader support, many feminist organizations pursued moderate abortion positions.

==== 1949–2000 ====
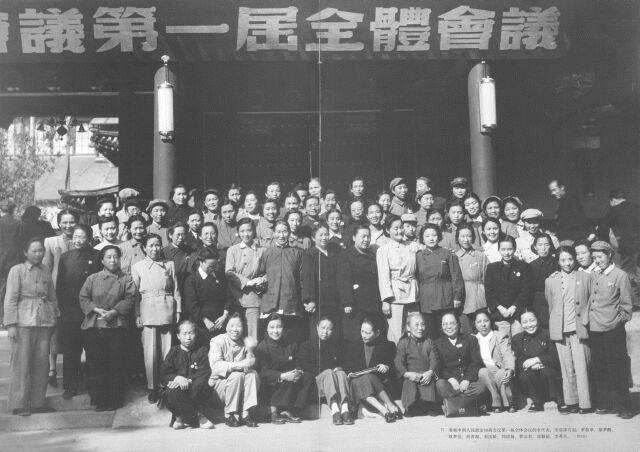
Women delegates who participated in the First plenary session of the Chinese People's Political Consultative Conference

In the Communist movement, "Women's liberation had been highlighted in the communist agenda from the outset, and, in that sense, the Chinese revolution was simultaneously a women's revolution, and Chinese socialism a women's cause." By the 1920s, the Communist movement in China used a labor and peasant organizing strategy that combined workplace advocacy with women's rights advocacy. The Communists would lead union organizing efforts among male workers while simultaneously working in nearby peasant communities on women's rights issues, including literacy for women. Mao Zedong and Yang Kaihui were among the most effective Communist political organizers using this method.

During the Chinese Civil War, the Communists enacted women's rights measures in areas of the country they controlled. In the revolutionary base area of Jiangxi, the Communist-led authorities enacted the Marriage Regulations of 1931 and the Marriage Laws of 1941, which were modeled after Soviet Union statutes. These statutes declared marriage as a free association between a woman and a man without the interference of other parties and permitted divorce on mutual agreement. At the time, they were the most progressive marriage laws in China and created the conditions for women to divorce men they had been forced to marry, leave abusive spouses, and till their own land.

In 1942, Ding Ling used International Women's Day to point out the hypocritical attitudes and behaviors of male communists and solved the special pressure on female revolutionaries. She claims that marriage still promotes the husband's control of his wife. However, because the pressure of marriage becomes unbearable, women will get married eventually.

During China's land reform movement (which began after the defeat of the Japanese in the Second Sino-Japanese War and continued in the early years of the People's Republic of China), the Chinese Communist Party (CCP) encouraged rural women in achieving a "double fanshen" - a revolutionary transformation as both a peasant and a feminist awakening as a woman. The CCP urged rural women to reject traditional Chinese assumptions about their role in society. In conjunction with land reform, the movement promoted women's issues such as the elimination of bride prices and reversing the stigma against widows remarrying. The CCP promoted successes in women's liberation, such as the progress of the Hui women of northwest China who were said to have not just received land through the rural movement, but also "freedom over their own bodies" and embraced political participation.

The revolt of women has shaken China to its very depths.... In the women of China, the Communists possessed, almost ready-made, one of the greatest masses of disinherited human beings the world has ever seen. And because they found the keys to the heart of these women, they also found one of the keys to victory...

J. Belden, 1946

The Great Leap Forward's focus on total workforce mobilization resulted in opportunities for women's labor advancement. As women became increasingly needed to work in agriculture and industry, and encouraged by policy to do so, the phenomenon of Iron Women arose. Women did traditionally male work in both fields and factories, including major movements of women into management positions. Women competed for high productivity, and those who distinguished themselves came to be called Iron Women. Slogans such as "There is no difference between men and women in this new age," and "We can do anything, and anything we do, we can do it well," became popular during the Great Leap Forward.

During the Cultural Revolution, one way China promoted its policy of state feminism was through revolutionary opera. Most of the eight model dramas in this period featured women as their main characters. The narratives of these women protagonists begin with them oppressed by misogyny, class position, and imperialism before liberating themselves through the discovery of their own internal strength and the CCP.

As a result of government approval following the Chinese Communist Revolution, women's rights groups became increasingly active in China: "One of the most striking manifestations of social change and awakening which has accompanied the Revolution in China has been the emergence of a vigorous and active Woman's Movement."

Beginning in the 70s and continuing in the 80s, however, many Chinese feminists began arguing that the Communist government had been "consistently willing to treat women's liberation as something to be achieved later, after class inequalities had been taken care of." Some feminists claim that part of the problem is a tendency on the government's part to interpret "equality" as sameness, and then to treat women according to an unexamined standard of male normalcy.

=== 21st century ===
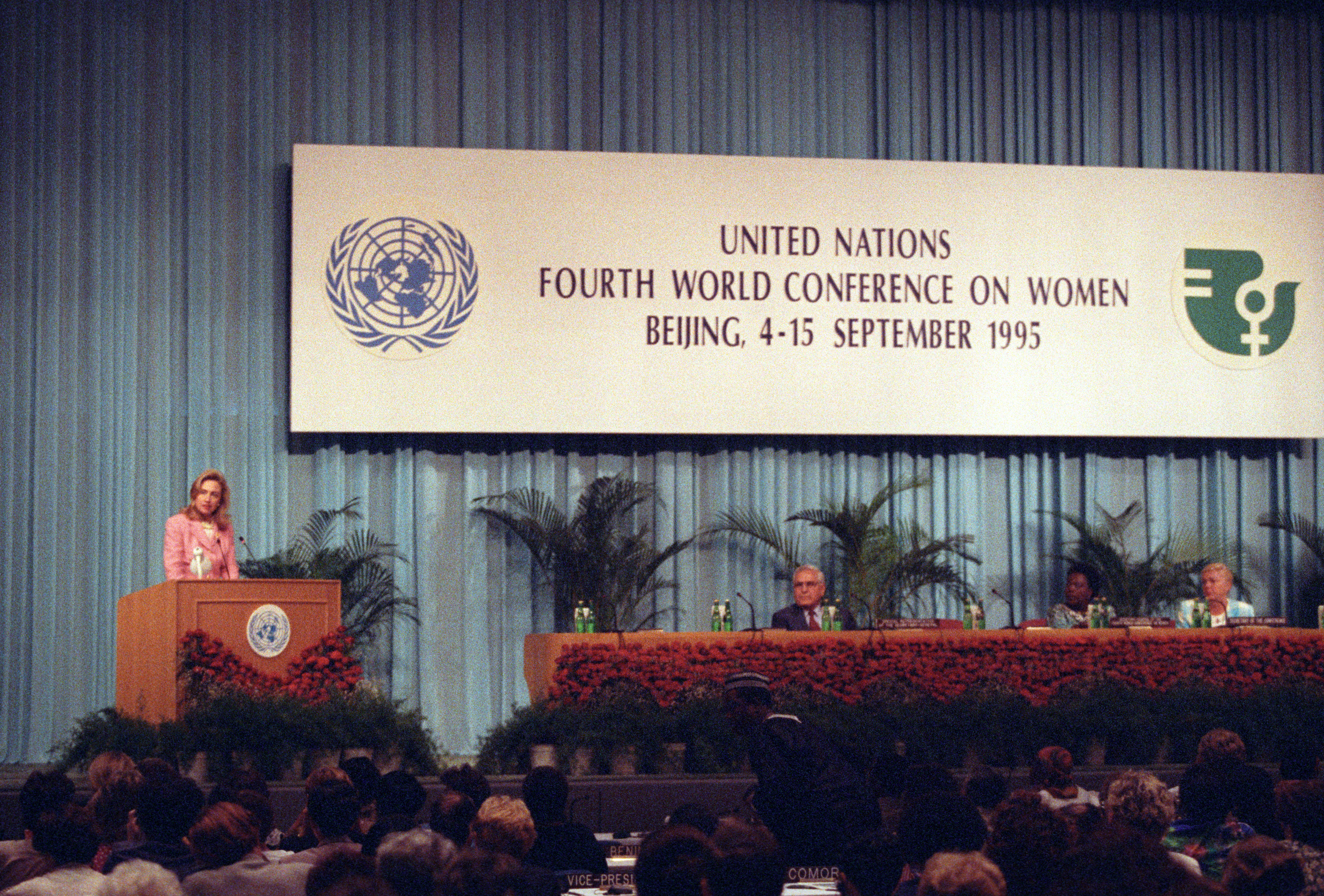
Hillary Clinton Addresses the Fourth United Nations Conference on Women at the Beijing International Conference Center in Beijing, China

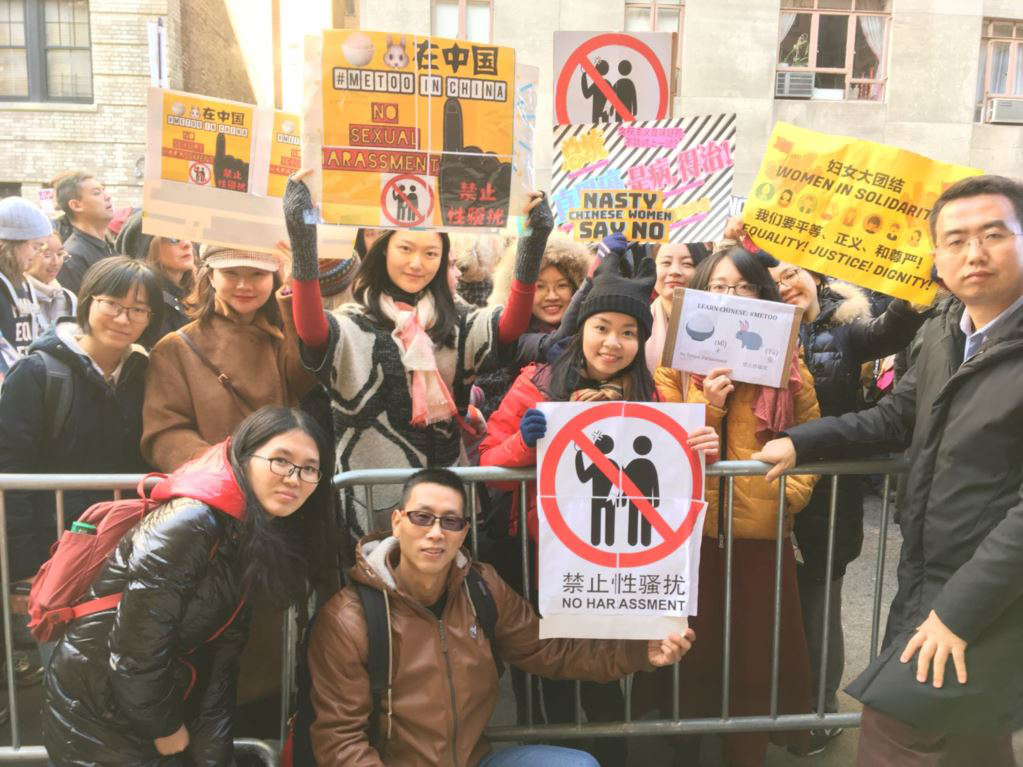
Chinese Feminist Women's March New York

In 1995, the Fourth World Conference on Women was convened in Beijing. This is the first United Nations conference held in China. In a show of hospitality, then Chinese Communist Party (CCP) general secretary Jiang Zemin announced at the opening ceremony that "men-women equality is a basic national policy". The phrasing became the political cornerstone of all post-1995 gender and women's development policy directory published by China's State Council and the Women's Federation. Along with the Conference, a parallel forum of NGO panel was held in the Huairou district in Beijing. The concept of Non-Government Organization (NGO) was thus introduced into China, giving rise to many feminist alliances in 21st century China, such as the Beijing Zhongze Legal Consulting Service Center led by Guo Jianmei, the Henan Shequ Educational Research Center, and the Anti-Domestic Violence Network which spearheaded the 20-year long campaign of enacting anti-domestic violence law, etc. The 1995 Conference also prompted the CCP to reform relevant government structures responsible for China's gender development. The National Working Committee on Children and Women (NWCCW) was established in anticipation of the Conference in 1993. The Women's Federation, which was technically a People's Organization pre-1995, was orally pronounced by the Beijing government at the Conference as a Non-Governmental Organization. The 1995 UN Conference also introduced concepts such as gender mainstreaming and domestic violence into China.

In 2001, China amended its marriage law, so that abuse was considered grounds for divorce. The law was deliberated via an open revision process which included input from feminist academics and women lawyers. Other civil and criminal laws were also amended to better protect women's rights and interests, including the inheritance law.

In 2005, China added new provisions to the Law on Women's Right Protection to include sexual harassment. In 2006 "The Shanghai Supplement" was drafted to help further define sexual harassment in China.

In 2013, the first woman to bring a gender discrimination lawsuit in China, a 23-year-old who went by the pseudonym of Cao Ju, won a small settlement of 30,000 yuan and an official apology from the Juren Academy.

In 2015, China enacted its first nationwide law prohibiting domestic violence, although it excluded same-sex couples and did not address sexual violence. The law also defined domestic violence for the first time. Domestic violence had become a subject of much public debate in China in 2011, when Kim Lee posted pictures of her bruised face on Chinese social media and accused her husband Li Yang of domestic violence. She later stated in The New York Times that police had told her no crime had happened; Li admitted beating her but criticized her for discussing private things in public.

In 2017, the Sina Weibo account of Feminist Voices (Nuquan Zhisheng, 女权之声), an important feminist organization in China, was suspended for thirty days after they posted an article about the planned women's strike in the United States on March 8 (International Women's Day). In March 2018 the account was deleted.

In 2018, Xixi Luo from Beihang University published an online accuse on Sina Weibo to her former PhD professor Xiaowu Chen, claiming she has been sexually harassed during her time at the university. Luo's statement went viral on Weibo, and was seen as China's first widely shared #MeToo moment. Following Luo's brave move, other Chinese university students came forward on Chinese social media with allegations against their former supervisors. As more and more sexual harassment cases being exposed in the public discourse, students and alumni from more than 70 universities jointly signed a letter advocating for proper legislation on protecting sexual harassment in colleges and universities. While this wave of online activism demonstrated the growing influence of digital platforms in shaping feminist discourse, it also revealed inequalities in access and participation. The #MeToo movement was mainly led by urban, educated women, while working-class and rural women remained underrepresented due to unequal internet access and technological barriers. This divide shows the need to make space for missing voices to ensure that future movements represent the experiences of all women.

In 2020, the Civil Code of the People's Republic of China introduced a mandatory "cooling-off period" for divorce filings, as specified in Article 1077. This provision came into effect on January 1, 2021. According to the article, either spouse can withdraw the divorce application within 30 days of filing with the marriage registration authority, if they have a change of heart during this cooling-off period. Furthermore, if neither spouse applies for a divorce certificate in person within 30 days after the cooling-off period ends, the divorce application is automatically considered withdrawn. In the same year a government directive was released banning employers in China from posting "men preferred" or "men only" job advertising, and banning companies from asking women seeking jobs about their childbearing and marriage plans or requiring applicants to take pregnancy tests.

In 2022, the Communist Youth League of China declared that "[e]xtreme feminism has become a poisonous tumour on the Internet.", which aroused the dissatisfaction and controversy of pan-feminists on Weibo. Feminists have become subject to increased scrutiny under the country's system of mass surveillance and censorship.

In 2024, Bloomberg News reported that the popularity of Taylor Swift among Chinese women reflected a rejection of increasingly conservative social expectations. Under the general secretaryship of Xi Jinping, the government has encouraged women to prioritize domestic roles and childbirth to counter a shrinking population. Analysts suggest that Swift's advocacy for feminism and LGBT rights provides a contrast to the state's promotion of traditional patriarchy and social conservatism. In 2026, the Cyberspace Administration of China launched a campaign directing Chinese social media platforms to censor content that "promotes not marrying and not having children" or that "provokes gender antagonism."

== Foot-binding ==
Foot binding in Chinese history was initially a mark of hierarchy and privilege in society. However, it soon became a symbol of sexism in many people's minds and lasted for over more than one hundred years. Having a bound foot meant looking prettier as men thought smaller feet were more beautiful and dainty for a woman. Chinese women in the nineteenth century were expected to keep up their appearance, as they did not have many other rights. They could not own as much property, they did not get good education, and they showed a lot of signs of "weakness" because they were treated so poorly. However, scholars of Chinese religion and society note that women generally never felt like they were being victimized by being forced to have bound feet, but that they quietly rebelled against this societal norm by way of acting. Early Chinese feminists in the nineteenth century would get around the rules that restricted to them, but not in an obvious way that would get them in trouble.

It was seen as a privilege to have bound feet because many women in rural households who were lower class did not marry hypergamously before 1949, and therefore, usually found no benefit in participating in foot-binding. Footbinding pointed up the physical differences between men and women, and therefore, encouraged the patriarchal society. In Chinese society during this time, parents would scare their daughters at a very young age by telling them that they had to get married and have bound feet to be happy in life. During the May Fourth Era, Chinese feminists began to reject foot-binding as a Feudal ideal, as they saw it as a great inequality for women in the new modern social system of the 1900s. Irene Dean, a scholar in Chinese feminism, has noted that the New Culture Movement truly shifted women's attitudes to more liberal tones. Female chastity was enforced through the concept of footbinding and the woman's way of paying respect to her husband and the men in power above her. Having bound feet meant being physically held back and controlled by a male-dominated society, and women during this time wanted to feel more free and independent.

In 1949, the Chinese Communist Party officially banned the practice of foot binding, and strictly enforced the ban. In spite of the ban, some people in China continued the practice in secret, even though the Communist Party enforced the ban by threat of execution.

== Thoughts on gender in the New Culture Movement ==
During the early years of the New Culture Movement, intellectuals and scholars such as Chen Duxiu, Cai Yuanpei, Li Dazhao, Lu Xun, Zhou Zuoren, He Dong, and Hu Shih called for the creation of a new Chinese culture based on global and western standards, especially democracy and science. Gender was also a central issue during the movement. In addition to the call for an institutional change of the patriarchal family in favor of individual freedom and women's liberation, many scholars also discussed various gender issues in their writings.

Lu Xun, a leading figure and influential writer of modern Chinese literature, published an article in the New Youth in 1918 titled "My Views on Chastity." As a response to the cult of female chastity in Neo-Confucianism which believed "starving to death is a small matter, but losing chastity is a great matter," Lu Xun directly argues against the idea that losing female chastity is the cause of corruption of social morality, questioning the functioning of patriarchal ideology in blaming women for the decline of a nation. "Why should women shoulder the whole responsibility for saving the world?" writes Lu Xun, "According to the old school, women belong to the yin, or negative element. Their place is in the home, as chattels of men. Surely, then, the onus for governing the state and saving the country should rest with the men, who belong to the men. However, a country's downfall is always blamed on women. Willy-nilly they have shouldered the sins of mankind for more than three thousand years. Since men are not brought to book and have no sense of shame, they go on seducing women as just as they please, while writers treat such incidents as romantic."

In November 1919, Miss Zhao's suicide sparked cultural debate regarding the role of modern women in social and political life, including among those involved in the New Culture Movement. A woman forced into an arranged marriage by her family, Miss Zhao, committed suicide by cutting her throat while being transported to the house of her would-be husband. The formerly routine occurrence of a woman's suicide to avoid arranged marriage became an important center of debate for Chinese feminists. Feminist commentators included Mao Zedong, who published nine newspaper articles about the suicide and the need to overhaul societal norms relating to women. Simultaneously, Henrik Ibsen's play A Doll's House was newly translated and being performed in Shanghai. The example of the play's Nora further fueled radical intellectuals and the discussion of women's roles in China.

After reading the play in 1924, Lu Xun wrote a continuation of the story titled "What Happens after Nora Leaves Home?" In his own story, Lu Xun explores what might happen if China's own version of Nora left home and he has a very pessimistic view of Nora and her liberation. Lu Xun proposes the idea that unless a structural and systemic reforming has been accomplished, any individual liberation will eventually end up in misery. In the same year, Lu Xun published a novel titled The New Year Sacrifice. One of the major themes of the novel is women's rights and marriage practices (including arranged marriages), as he writes, "This poor woman, abandoned by people in the dust as a tiresome and worn-out toy, once left her own imprint in the dust, and those who enjoy life must have wondered at her for wishing to prolong her existence; but now at least she has been swept clear by eternity. Whether spirits exist or not I do not know; but in the present world when a meaningless existence ends, so that someone whom others are tired of seeing is no longer seen, it is just as well, both for the individual concerned and for others."

In addition to Lu Xun, there were also important female writers who focused on women's situation and gender liberation after the May Fourth Movement, including Feng Yuanjun and Lu Yin.

== Differences from Western feminism ==
Chinese feminism differs from Western feminism in that Chinese feminism has no history of assuming that "man" and "woman" are natural categories. Rather, Chinese culture has always assumed that "man" and "woman" are socially constructed categories. Chinese sociologist and sexologist Pan Suiming once used the constructionist framework to argue that "sexuality" was never seen as a "biological instinct" in ancient China. Sexuality in its natural form never exists, and it is only represented in a framework of social construction and cultural interpretation. As he contends, the west constructed the scientific discourse of biological sex based on preexisted notions of different genders, while in China, since the scientific truth of gender was never a big concern of traditional Chinese culture, gender is only seen as various gender roles played by men and women throughout the history of China. Moreover, most of the leaders in Chinese feminism movements are men, not women, while in western countries, women are the main sponsors of movements for Woman's Rights. Unlike Western feminism movements initiated by grassroots activists, modern Chinese feminism began as a matter of state policy. That is, the Communist Party's ideology during the Revolution of 1949 held that equal labor and social participation was necessary to advance the nation's prosperity. However, there are also radical scholars who have pointed out that gender equality was never a central concern of early state policies, and the proposed idea of "equal labor" still signifies a hierarchal nature of gendered division of labor. For example, the Iron Girl campaign was one of the famous campaigns during the Communist revolution which promoted equal labor and social participation of women. Initially, women were organized and mobilized to enter traditional male occupations to serve as a reserve labor force and to compensate for the labor shortage caused by the outflow of men's labor, not for the purpose of creating gender equality. Often the purpose of making "women do men's work" was a pragmatic choice that local administrators made when men alone could not handle the work.

Western feminism differs from Chinese feminism in the way that it focuses a lot on "gender", which is not the way that feminism is analyzed historically in China. Some Chinese feminists agree with the sense of translatability and transferability in Chinese feminism, while others do not. "Translatability" and "transferability" refer to mixing Chinese feminism with Western feminism. Support for this concept is mostly a Western ideal, but feminists such as Wang Zheng also support spreading the two-word phrase that Chinese culture uses for "gender." In Chinese culture, the phrase, "Shehui xingbie" implies something different than the English word, "gender." "Shehui" means "social," and "xingbie" means "gender/sex." The phrase points up the constructed gender roles in China, which many Chinese feminists have analyzed. Some Chinese feminists toy with this phrase as a way of breaking away from the roles in which they are expected to live up to in their culture. Chinese feminists who disagree with this type of feminism say that it has to do with assimilation to western countries.

Others, such as Li Xiaojiang, do not; they believe that translatability and transferability are becoming the issue for Chinese feminism and its location in international feminism. Additionally, filmmaker Li Yu notes that Chinese feminism in a classic sense requires a softer and quieter voice than the face of Western feminism. However, now that there are more facets inspiring anger among Chinese women, there seems to be a clash between different types of feminism. A lot of Western feminists see these quiet and more subdued Chinese feminists as "anti-feminist" due to, one could say, a lack of understanding of Chinese culture and history. These ideals come from three decades of post-Maoist China. Additionally, others see the concept of "difference" as an important facet to their idea of feminism, meaning being a third world woman should be considered, in their opinion, to be separate from the notion of Western feminism. More recent scholarly analysis begins with the naming and aims to identify the forms of gender struggles popularly referred to as "Chinese feminism" within China and in anglophone academe. The main strains of gender contentions engage, culturally and materially, with the hegemonic marriage institution of postsocialist China. These actual contentions on the ground, however, are obscured by the two dominant analytical perspectives, both of which follow lineages of Western thoughts and priorities: "Chinese feminism is discursively annihilated as it is besieged by the liberal preoccupation with China's 'authoritarian present' and the new left agenda to resurrect its 'socialist legacy.'"

== Prominent Chinese feminists ==
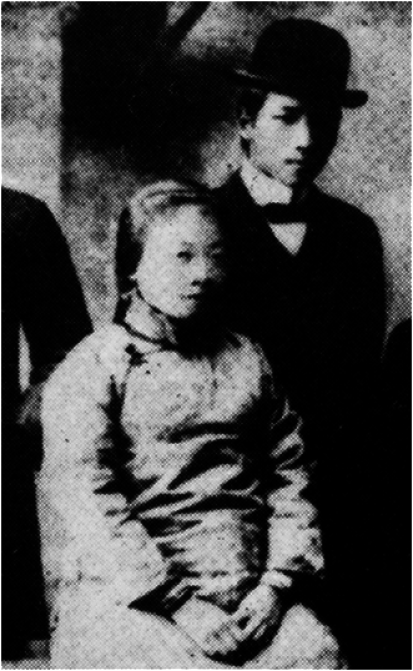
Chinese feminist and anarchist He-Yin Zhen

The development of Chinese feminist theory is connected to the history of the Chinese Communist Party. Throughout the twentieth century, the problems that feminists discussed were issues that addressed the relationship between the Communist government and women. Women were often excluded from policy debate, and could not argue against government policies or programs. Xinyan Jiang has stated that although feminists have fought for social equality, they still face discrimination because of economic and social challenges in China. Li Xiaojiang is a writer and scholar that was active during the 1980s in China, and is considered to be one of the most prominent women scholars of the decade by scholars such as Wang Zheng. Her influence led to the start of the first women's studies classes and the first women's studies department in China and Li also created the Women's Studies Department at Zhengzhou University. Her 1983 essay "Progress of Mankind and Women's Liberation" (Renlei jinbu yu funü jiefang) was the first women's studies publication in China; the Association of Women's Studies was founded two years later. Her theory was rooted in highlighting the gender and sexual differences prevalent in China at the time. She explained historical discrepancies through arguing that traditional cultural norms existed in socialist China. She also expressed the difficulty for women to identify in China, as they were torn between their established role at home and their new liberation put upon them by socialism. Nicola Spakowski has stated that Li is somewhat critical of the influence of Western feminism on Chinese feminism. Li argues that because there are cultural and language differences between the East and West, the influence of Western ideology becomes a threat to establishing an independent Chinese feminist theory. Another early 20th century prominent feminist was the anarchist He-Yin Zhen who founded the Journal "Natural Justice" while in exile in Japan. He-Yin focused on issues within Chinese feminist theory rather than issues with comparing it to Western feminism. However, her theories are not specific to Chinese culture, so she is considered a global feminist by historians such as Mary John. Her essay, "On Women's Liberation" addressed women's issues within China, particularly how women's liberation is decided by others within the hierarchical system of society at the time. Her essay, "On the Question of Women's Labor" discusses how "modern form of labor" has impacted women, and how their bodies are historically tied to their labor.

Though not self-identified as a feminist, Ding Ling's writings and thoughts on gender issues resonate a lot with feminist ideas and ideals. In March 1932, Ding Ling joined the CCP, and she was recognized as an active writer in the League of Left-Wing Writers. During her time in the CCP, Ding Ling published several well-known essays and novels concerning gender issues and living situation of women. In 1942 she wrote an article in a CCP newspaper, titled "Thoughts on March 8", questioning the CCP's commitment to change popular attitudes towards women. Because of her explicit descriptions of sentimentality and sexuality, as well as her public critique of the CCP's leadership, Ding Ling was denounced as a "rightist" and purged from the party in 1957. Her fiction and essays were then also banned. After many years of imprisonment, she reemerged in 1979, and became the vice president of the Chinese Writers Association.

Yu Zhengxie and Yuan Mei were two of the first male feminists in China.

Contemporary Chinese feminist thinkers, activists, writers and lawyers include: Ai Xiongming, Wang Zheng, Lü Pin, and Zhao Sile.

== Feminist movements and organizations in China ==
It was not until the 20th century when reforms for women's rights began as issues concerning women came under the spotlight. Unexpectedly, most of the early reforms for Chinese Women were conducted by men. For example, the May Fourth Movement of 1919 was the first impactful cultural movement of modern China, which heavily enlightened China on the importance of a woman's role in society. This movement promoted women's suffrage, denounced foot binding and shone light on the inhumanity of arranged marriages and the poor quality of women's education.

Among the major leaders of the women's movement in China during the 1920s, both Communist and more broadly, was Xiang Jingyu. The Kuomintang executed her on 1 May 1929 during a purge targeting Communists and their supporters.

By the late 20th century, women began to gain greater autonomy through the formation of women-only organizations. Chinese women's organizations began to emerge during the Zhang Mao era (1948–1976) such as the All-China Women's Federation. These organizations allowed issues concerning women's interests, welfare, and equal rights to be addressed.

=== Chinese YWCA ===
The Chinese YWCA was established in Shanghai in 1899. It focused on the advancement of women's issues through self-cultivation, self-liberation, and addressing social ills. It had a prominent role in the women's movement and although it did not advocate for radical political change, its night classes for women factory workers contributed to the spread of ideals of patriotism, nationalism, and anti-imperialism.

=== All-China Women's Federation ===
This organization was established in 1949 to protect women's rights and represent their interests. Scholar Qi Wang explains this all female non-governmental organization in a feminist context where women were finally challenging the government's tighter control on social organizations. These were feminist modes of protests, in private and public spaces, that contributed to the introduction of new generational changes to resist inequalities. Other organizations in China, such as the Human Rights Watch, addresses that the ACWF "is promoting a damaging narrative about women's subservience in an attempt to fix social issues".

Because the leadership posts of the ACWF are appointed by the Chinese Communist Party, some observers argue that those in leadership roles may not always represent the full diversity of women's interests, given that they are not chosen via popular election. It has also been argued that local women's federations often face constraints in exercising authority—such as limited administrative capacity, bureaucratic procedures, and challenges in policy implementation—which some analysts view as factors affecting the broader trajectory of feminist development across China.

== Arrest of Feminist Five ==
The Feminist Five is a group of five young Chinese feminists who planned a demonstration against sexual harassment on public transportation. They became known after the Chinese government arrested them for this demonstration.

=== Reason for arrest ===
In early March 2015, young feminists around China were preparing to distribute stickers with information about gender equality and sexual harassment, such as men groping women on crowded trains and buses, to commemorate the International Women's Day. But on March 6, 2015, the police arrested dozens of people in Beijing, the southern city of Guangzhou, and the eastern city of Hangzhou. Most of the arrested were released within a few days of the incident. However, Li Maizi (birth name Li Tingting) (李婷婷) (30), Wei Tingting (韦婷婷) (26), Zheng Churan nicknamed “Giant Rabbit” (郑楚然) (25), Wu Rongrong (武嵘嵘) (30), and Wang Man (王曼) (33), were detained on suspicion of "Picking quarrels and provoking trouble". They were held inside the Beijing Haidian Detention Center, where they were interrogated daily.

=== International attention ===
The timing of the arrest and detention of the feminist five increased the amount of international attention at this event. A hashtag campaign #FreetheFive spread news about their arrest quickly and gained support of people from all around the world. By the end of their detention, over two million people had signed petitions that demanded their release. Several governments and NGOs on women's rights saw their arrest as a provocative and disrespectful action from the Chinese government towards the international feminist community. The feminists were arrested right before the International Women's Day and during CCP General Secretary Xi Jinping's preparations to co-host UN summit on women's rights as a celebration of the twentieth anniversary of the Fourth UN Conference on Women in Beijing. In reaction Hillary Clinton tweeted, "Xi hosting a meeting on women's rights at the UN while persecuting feminists? Shameless." Such global diplomatic and media pressure lead to the eventual release of the Feminist Five. At the end of 2015, Amnesty International recalled that during "the past two years, the Chinese authorities have stopped the activities of three non-governmental organizations defending the rights of women." And that moreover "the Chinese authorities are currently detaining at least 11 women's rights activists and are persecuting dozens of others." Among these was the lawyer Wang Yu, who defended the five activists arrested in March 2015.

=== Their release ===
Following a 37-day period of detainment, the Feminist Five secured their release on bail on April 13, 2015. This marked a historic moment as the group became the initial cohort of social activists in China to be liberated from detention simultaneously. Despite their release from prison, the Chinese government continues to regard these women as criminal suspects. This classification imposes constraints on various aspects of their lives, affecting their employment prospects, restricting their physical movement, and limiting their civil and political rights.

=== Events that came after the Feminist Five ===
After the release of the Feminist Five, Hong Fincher interviewed the female activist, as she was interested in their impact on the world thus was one of the inspirations that lead to her book, released in 2018, titled Betraying Big Brother: The Feminist Awakening in China.

There were not a lot of feminist activities happening in China after the arrest of the Feminist Five. Although the movement gained a lot of attention, it soon became a lot more difficult to make activism a full-time job in China as it has been a struggle to obtain financial support for their activist work and their personal means. The reason for this is because in the China Change article, it says that "... it is now illegal to accept funding from foundations that have not established offices in China.", and the lack of funding makes it difficult for new recruits to join the feminist movement.

One of the Feminist Five faced consequences from their actions. Wu Rongrong, (武嵘嵘) had a 10-year travel ban from leaving China after trying to gain visa to Hong Kong for law school. In the year 2017, Wu Rongrong was finally able to renew her passport to Hong Kong and is able to study Law there.

Zheng Churan, another one of the Feminist Five, protested against Donald Trump and pointing out the negative behaviours he had done towards women.

The actions of the Feminist Five lead to the emergence in popularity, within China, of an ongoing movement, called the #MeToo movement. Because of this, many university students, both female and male, in China had gathered to sign petitions against harassment, showing that the younger generations are taking action on these issues that happen in China.

== Digital feminism in China ==
=== Online terms and trends ===
The rise of digital feminist activity has coincided with new terminology. Examples include neologisms such as referring to men as nǎn (Chinese: 蝻; lit. 'nymphs of locusts'), as a near-homophone of nàn (Chinese: 男; trans. "male"). As of 2015, the phrase "Straight man cancer" (Chinese: 直男癌; pinyin: zhí nán ái) is used to describe men who are sexist and toxically masculine, ignorant to the gendered privileges they enjoy. In 2024, users on Weibo began reversing ‘female virtue’ (Chinese:女德; Pinyin: Nǚdé) – a concept founded in Confucian ideals to regulate female behaviour – to form a ‘male virtue’ (Chinese: 男德; Nándé) to assess men's behaviour online.

Chinese feminists have also promoted international digital trends and campaigns, such as the #MeToo movement and the 6B4T movement. Online beauty influencers have also used hashtags for the promotion of feminist-linked social media posts on Weibo.

Digital feminists have also promoted their ideas through engaging in boycotts and buycotts of specific brands, deemed to have committed acts favouring and opposing digital feminist goals/values. Digital feminists used social media to boycott Procter and Gamble following their removal of a campaign with Yang Li to promote sanitary pads, and to buycott Hanshu for cutting ties with Kris Wu, a pop-star accused of rape in the #MeToo movement.

=== Censorship and anti-feminism ===
Anti-feminist discourse in China is also present online, as users and the state aim to censor and delegitimise the feminist movement. Under Xi Jinping, education and media censorship have promoted increasingly patriarchal, conservative values. As such, online misogyny is a growing phenomenon in China, with digital platforms allowing and even enabling the harassment of feminists. Websites with user-generated content such as Bilibili still suffer from self-censorship, which obfuscates the concept of feminism. Studies of Weibo accounts and posts highlight other strategies used to antagonise feminism, depicting it as war, illness or extremist religion. This rhetoric illustrates feminists as “a malevolent force” to be annihilated.

Following China's relaxation of restrictions on the number of children permitted per family under the pro-natalist Three Child Policy (Chinese: 三孩政策; Pinyin: Sānháizhèngcè), radical feminists adhering to 6B4T ideology have come under increasing censorship, with Douban having banned more than 10 online radical feminist groups by the 12th of April, 2021. Likewise, scholars have noted specific 6B4T-aligned group's more tacit support of the ideology, alongside posting statements referencing a will to align with China's national security efforts following such censorship.

Nationalist users condemn feminist accounts as “Western” or traitors “betraying the nation,” aligning with the CCP narratives that portray feminism as threatening Chinese stability and security. Chinese state policy prioritises the promotion of a “harmonious society” and preventing “social unrest,” and this has been used to justify the moderation of content questioning gender inequality. In 2018, the organization Feminist Voices was permanently banned from both Weibo and WeChat for “violating the ... state’s policy”.

Despite this, activists have creatively counteracted anti-feminist surveillance using coded language, editing and subversive hashtags. However, increased interaction between feminist activists digitally has also unintentionally allowed the state alongside social media platforms like BiliBili to track and suppress users and their movements.

== Issues ==
- One-child policy
- Sexuality in China
- Prostitution in China
- Domestic Violence and restriction on divorce
- LGBT rights in China

== Feminists from China ==
- Guo Jing (activist)
- He Zhen (anarchist)
- Kang Tongbi
- Li Tingting
- Lü Pin (activist)
- Qiu Jin
- Tang Qunying
- Xiaowen Liang
- Xu Zihua
- Ye Haiyan
- Yu Zhengxie (male feminist)
- Zheng Churan

== See also ==
- 6B4T movement
- Feminism in Chinese Communism
