= Guo Jing (disambiguation) =

Guo Jing, Kwok Ching or Kuo Ching may refer to:

- Guo Jing (郭靖), a fictional character from Jin Yong's Condor Trilogy
- Guo Jing (activist), Chinese women's rights activist, book author, social worker
- Guo Jing (footballer), Chinese footballer
- Claire Kuo (郭靜), Taiwanese singer
