= Wu Shuqing =

Wu Shuqing (Wade–Giles: Wu Shu-ch'ing) may refer to:

- Wu Shuqing (revolutionary) (吳淑卿; 1892–?), Chinese revolutionary
- Wu Shuqing (economist) (吴树青; 1932–2020), Chinese economist
- Annie Wu (businesswoman) (伍淑清; born 1948), Hong Kong businesswoman
