= 4B movement =

Radical feminist movement

4B or "Four Nos" is a South Korean feminist movement whose proponents do not date, marry, have sex with or have children with men. The name refers to its defining four tenets which all start with the Korean-language term bi (Korean: 비; Hanja: 非). The prefix bi- is Sino-Korean in origin, functioning similarly to the English prefix "un-" or "non-". Because it sounds like the letter "B", the movement’s name simultaneously functions as a number and an acronym. The movement emerged between 2017 and 2019 on Twitter and on the website WOMAD. It has since spread internationally, namely to the United States after the 2024 US presidential election. Some perceive the movement as a representation of anti-family values, claiming it promotes misandry and escalates gender conflict.

The movement is deemed fringe in South Korea, and it has since reportedly declined there. In South Korea, a portion of the movement's followers, particularly those of WOMAD, were described by several sources as being misandrist, transphobic, and homophobic towards gay men.

== Beliefs ==
The four core tenets to the 4B movement are:

- no sex with men (Korean: 비섹스; RR: bisekseu),
- no giving birth (비출산; bichulsan),
- no dating men (비연애; biyeonae), and
- no marriage with men (비혼; bihon).

=== Bihon (no marriage) ===
A 2022 survey of unmarried South Koreans aged 19 to 34 found that 69.7% of women (compared to 79.8% of men) expressed a desire to marry in the future. In traditional heterosexual South Korean households, women perform a disproportionate amount of the unpaid labor, and men are the head of the household. Some followers of the 4B movement claim that the movement helps protect them from any potential risks of marriage, including domestic violence, being heartbroken, and an unequal distribution of labor.

=== Bichulsan (no childbirth) ===
Many South Korean people are reluctant to have children due to the lack of workplace accommodations. More than 40% of South Korean women choose an extended career break after marriage and childbirth, while some of those who stay in work struggle to progress their careers. The 4B movement proposes that women focus on financial independence, including forgoing childbirth.

South Korea has one of the lowest birth rates in the world. As of 2023, the fertility rate is at 0.72, significantly below the 2.1 threshold required to maintain a country's population. The country's birth rate has been below the replacement rate since 1983, while the 4B movement originated in the 2010s, making it likely that the low birth rate is due to economic insecurity experienced by young adults, high child-rearing costs, high property prices, and the priorities of young women.

A 2022 survey of unmarried South Koreans aged 19 to 34 found that 55.3% of women (as compared to 70.5% of men) indicated an intention of having children.

=== Biyeonae (no romance with men) and bisekseu (no sexual relationships with men) ===
Women of the 4B movement do not engage in romance and sexual relationships with men, because they see it as an extension of the patriarchal family structure.

== Notable proponents ==
Jung Se-young and Baeck Ha-na, two proponents, criticize marriage as reinforcing gender roles in South Korea. The movement draws some inspiration from the novel Kim Ji-young, Born 1982, as do South Korea's MeToo and "Escape the Corset" movements.

Lee Min-gyeong is a South Korean feminist writer and an early member of the 4B movement. In an interview with ABC, Lee said that Korean women were traditionally expected to center their lives around men and that the 4B movement is about rejecting relationships with them, in any way. She argues that there are two factors that contribute to driving some Korean women to reject the "heterosexual narrative": the double-burden placed on Asian women to perform the majority of domestic labor while also being employed and the spy-cam epidemic that has since evolved into deepfake pornography. Lee stated that while some referred to the movement as a "sex strike," it was more about "redefining how we are meant to live without those four 'Nos'".

== History ==
The term 4B emerged from Korean feminist circles on Twitter around 2017 to 2018, after a highly publicized 2016 murder of a woman by a man. The murderer, who said he did it because women had ignored him, was not charged with a hate crime. Another cause was the rise in far-right social media platform Ilbe Storehouse in 2014, which regularly promotes misogynistic posts. This was also followed by 'gender wars' in 2015.

The movement gained broader recognition on Twitter in 2019 and through various feminist social media accounts, but has lost momentum since its early days. One notable feature of the 4B movement, as with other Korean digital feminist movements, is that members often identify themselves as "anonymous women", as it is conventional not to disclose personal details online.

=== Escape the Corset Movement ===
The "Escape the Corset" Movement that started in 2016 served as a source of inspiration for the 4B movement. The movement calls for women to liberate themselves from sexual, social, bodily, and psychological standards. The word "corset" is used by Korean feminists as a metaphor for the societal pressure placed on women, including toxic beauty standards. Notably, South Korea has the 10th largest beauty market globally and is the third-largest cosmetics exporter. Members of the "Escape the Corset" Movement criticize and decline cosmetic procedures, skincare or makeup rituals, and the adoption of trendy clothing, all perceived as perpetuating consumerism and misogynistic social norms. In protest, they express their choices by destroying makeup, forgoing cosmetic enhancements, shaving their heads, and rejecting fashionable attire. Escape the Corset's analysis and approach to protest deeply influenced the 4B movement.

=== South Korea's #MeToo movement ===
Although the #MeToo movement originated in the United States in 2006 and gained popularity in 2017, many other countries, including South Korea, created #MeToo movements of their own. The #MeToo movement in South Korea, like those in other countries, encouraged women to express their experiences of sexual harassment to inspire social change. Shortly after its inception in late 2017, several hundred women stepped forward with claims of sexual harassment and violence. This movement also encouraged previous comfort women of the Imperial Japanese Army during World War II and the Japanese occupation of Korea to speak more freely in large numbers about their sexual abuse.

The #MeToo movement also inspired various online hashtag campaigns, most popularly the #WithYou tag, to signal solidarity with survivors of sexual assault who had spoken up in the #MeToo movement. These various hashtags inspired the formation of women's activist groups, such as Citizens Action to Support the #MeToo Movement, which campaigned to end gendered oppression and support victims of sexual abuse in South Korea.

=== Expansion to the United States ===
After the 2024 United States presidential election in which Donald Trump won a second term, some American women expressed interest in the 4B movement as a form of protest against Trump's election, his alleged sexual assaults, and his role in the overturning of Roe v. Wade. Other American women expressed interest in 4B as a method to support other women and to protect their health and safety should they lose access to birth control or abortion. Shortly after the election was called, TikTok videos mentioning 4B were viewed hundreds of thousands of times, and Google searches about it spiked by 450%. American women have called the movement the "4 Nos" and "Lysistrata".

=== Expansion to China ===
Chinese feminists have adopted and reinterpreted the 4B and 6B4T movements to fit their own political environment. In 2021, the movement gained the attention of Chinese internet censors on the social networking site Douban. The keyword "6B4T" was removed from the website and over 10 feminist groups were shut down prompting unintentional attention to the movement and criticism about Douban's actions.

== Reception ==
The 4B movement is considered to be fringe in South Korea, with Ju Hui Judy Han of UCLA arguing that "the vast majority of South Korean feminists do not abide by it," and that "4B is not representative of Korean feminist politics." Internationally, various hashtags and social media posts have been used to express support for the movement.

=== Transphobia and homophobia in the South Korean movement ===
Feminism, especially radical feminism, in South Korea has had a notable transphobic and homophobic (against male homosexuals) issue, with internal disputes about the acceptability of such beliefs. The 4B movement was significantly popular on (and widely publicly associated with) the South Korean website WOMAD, which is considered to be misandrist, homophobic, and transphobic. The website was founded because Megalia had begun prohibiting homophobic and transphobic slurs. WOMAD members reportedly advocated for revenge against men, advocated for disliked people to commit suicide, and some threatened violence and committed crimes against men. Mothers were labeled both victims and conformers to patriarchal society that discriminate against their daughters. Many WOMAD members compared married women to slaves. One trans person interviewed in South Korea argued that, while most South Korean women were not transphobic, the strongest advocates for 4B in South Korea were on and radicalized by WOMAD.

Some members of the 4B movement have reportedly advocated for the use of ID scanners to verify sex before entering public restrooms, and for more sex segregation at protests. Various communities involved in the 4B movement reportedly asked that members take photos so that others could verify their biological sex; one such group asked for videos of people's Adam's apples.

Some South Korean queer and trans feminists reportedly expressed concern that the 2024 international interest in the 4B movement could lead to an increase in anti-trans rhetoric and a resurgence of the 4B movement in South Korea.

== See also ==
- 6B4T movement
- Domestic violence in South Korea
- Female separatism
- Femosphere
- Gender inequality in South Korea
- Herbivore men
- Conscription in South Korea
- Misandry
- Men Going Their Own Way, antifeminist movement among men advocating disengagement from women
- Neijuan
  - Tang ping
- Political lesbianism
  - Queer nationalism
- Sexual abstinence
- Voluntary childlessness
  - Anti-natalism
  - Shakers, an 18th-century religious movement whose members also refused marriage, sex and child-rearing against the wider culture; they now have just three members
- Sampo generation
- Singleton (lifestyle)
- Incel
