= Miss Zhao's suicide =

Suicide of a Chinese woman

Miss Zhao's suicide was a suicide that occurred in Changsha, Hunan, China on November 14, 1919. Zhao Wuzhen, or "Miss Zhao," was found to have committed suicide in her “bridal sedan chair” on the way to her arranged marriage. It is widely understood that Zhao committed suicide as a way to protest her arranged marriage. "Miss Zhao's suicide" attracted wide attention from Chinese society, and raised criticism of the traditional marriage practices. Many social critics and editorialists of the New Culture Movement used this incident to spur conversations advocating for women's liberation, and emphasizing the importance of love within marriages. Many regarded Zhao Wuzhen, along with other women who lost their lives due to traditional sexual subordination and discrimination at the time, as one of "the important martyrs in history of Chinese feminism."

== Historical context ==
The 1911 revolution was not an efficient ending to Chinese imperial thoughts and conservative culture. Yuan Shikai, the leader of the newly established republic, once again attempted to drive the country back to imperial rule by suspending the Chinese Parliament, rewriting the constitution, sponsoring assassinations against his political enemies, and promoting the traditionally conservative culture of Confucianism. Witnessing and disappointed by the failure of the political revolution in China, many writers and activists came to the conclusion that mere political revolution was not enough to foster changes in China, there also needed to be a cultural revolution. They advocated for reforms to the family traditions, which they believed were the source of subordination in China that prevented the Chinese people from being free individuals and thoughtful citizens. They regarded the traditional family system as a system of oppression, both from elders to youths and from men to women. Since women were regarded as an important component as well as the major victim of the traditional family system, many saw the liberation of women as a necessary and essential step to changing the system. Chen Duxiu, for instance, argued that "most women did not participate in politics, as modern civilization required, because they were bound by the Confucian teaching that to be a woman means to submit, that the wife’s words should not travel beyond her own apartment, and that a woman does not discuss affairs outside the home." Such a narrative of women and family quickly became popular among young individuals in the New Culture Movement. People began to widely advocate for women to get education, jobs, and freedom with marriages, as means hoping for strengthen and unifying China. Chinese feminism of the period was sophistically entangled with the surging Chinese nationalism, which resulted from the May Fourth Movement. As a result, the incident of “Miss Zhao’s Suicide” became a source for activists in the New Culture Movement to address the problems and the evilness embedded in the old cultural practice of arranged marriage. Moreover, advocates for the New Culture Movement also derived the conversation surrounding this incident into discussion of free love, criticism of money being associated with marriage, and outine of future marriage reform.

== Synopsis of events ==
Zhao Wuzhen was twenty-two years old when her parents arranged a marriage for her. She was an educated woman whose father owned a glass workshop. Zhao's parents chose the son of the Wu family to be her husband, and initially, she was agreeable to the situation. However, she later asked to delay the marriage and was refused. On the day of the intended wedding, Zhao was to sit on her bridal sedan chair and be carried by the bearers into her husband's house. Yet, halfway through the journey, the bearers noticed that blood started leaking out from the sedan chair. The bearers decided to speed up their process and ask the groom's family for further instructions. The groom's family was concerned, and debated whether they should still carry the bride into their house, but ended up deciding to. When they unveiled the sedan chair they found Zhao unconscious due to excessive bleeding, but still alive. They sent her to the hospital, but were unable to save her from death. It was concluded that Zhao had hidden a blade on herself, and had committed suicide while hidden in the bridal sedan.

=== Variations in the story ===
The exact logistics of the story have been told many ways, and the true facts are likely impossible to know. Some sources alleged that she used a dagger, and others a razor. The exact reasoning for her hesitation regarding the marriage, as well as her motivation for suicide, were also obscured. The most commonly reported theory is simply that Miss Zhao heard a rumor that her fiancé was very ugly, and perhaps too old for her as well. Another suggested that she discovered that he had a daughter from his previous marriage, which made him a less desirable husband. It was also rumored that Miss Zhao had been engaged previously to a man from the Xu family, but that her fiancé died before they were married. This theory went that the ghost of her first fiancé had come to her and asked her not to go through with the marriage. Yet another rumor claimed that Zhao had become concerned with the ongoing gossip that Wu had been caught for illegal activities in Hankou, Hubei and was hence sentenced to jail. As a result, she had asked to delay the marriage until she knew the truth about the situation. However, the groom ended up returning to Changsha, Hunan the day before marriage, and the groom's family decided to reject the bride's request. Another rumor that is reported in varying degrees is that Miss Zhao's father had slapped her on the morning of her wedding, because she expressed her hesitation to marry Mr. Wu, and was difficult while getting ready for the wedding. Some say that it was this slap, combined with the pressure to marry, that pushed Miss Zhou over the edge. When interviewed, her father denied that this happened.

== Media reactions ==
Immediately after the incident, Da Gong Bao, or Public Interest, reported it in an article titled "The Tragedy of a Bride Committing Suicide in Her Bridal Sedan Chair." This article sparked, discussions and debates among Changsha newspapers. Intellectuals and activists, including Mao Zedong and Yi Long, wrote and participated in the conversation. Da Gong Bao, being the first to report the incident, sponsored follow-up investigations searching for the cause of this incident. Since the litigant had died, there was not a consensus among why "Miss Zhao" committed the suicide. In order to maintain subjectiveness, the newspaper collected three different rumors regarding to the suicide of Zhao, and reported all three together.

The first rumor claimed that the bride was concerned with the ongoing gossip that the groom was caught for illegal activities in Hankou, Hubei, and was hence sentenced to jail. As a result, the bride asked to delay the marriage, and wanted to make the final decision after the truth was revealed. However, the groom ended up returning to Changsha, Hunan the day before the marriage, so the groom family decided to reject the bride's request, making the bride consider using her suicide to protest. The second rumor said that the bride refused to being married, and thus committed suicide, because she wanted to preserve her chastity. The rumor said that the bride was initially married to a member of the Xu family, but the marriage was not processed, because the Xu groom died before the date of the marriage. As a result, the bride made a swear that she would never remarry. The third rumor focused on the unwillingness of the bride to marry because of the age difference. The rumor said the bride was only twenty years old, while the groom was already over forty years old. The groom was also claimed by the rumor to have a marriage history and unpleasant appearance. The family of the bride agreed to this marriage solely because of the luxurious betrothal presents that the groom's family provided for the marriage. The rumor said that on the day of marriage, the bride refused to wake up, wear make-up, and attend the wedding. As a result, her father violently slapped her and forced her to get on the bridal sedan chair, which contributed to her final decision of committing suicide.

The many rumors surrounding Zhao's reasoning revealed three different perspectives and voices within Chinese society at the time. The rumor that Miss Zhao simply wanted to be sure of her future husband's status as a felon was most focused on by investigators, who aimed to discover the truth in the most enthusiastic way. The rumor that Zhao was refusing to marry because of her commitment to a previous fiancé embraced the traditional views of women's virtues, whose biggest goal in life was to protect her chastity. In contrast, the rumor that Miss Zhao was simply being picky and did not want to marry an older or unattractive man was the complete opposite of the former; it was explained under the principles advocated by the New Culture Movement, which promoted rejections against the traditional views of family and women.

Unfortunately, Da Gong Bao did not sponsor further investigations to evaluate the accuracy of these three rumors. In fact, in the period after the incident (from November 15, 1919, to December 2 of 1919), Da Gong Bao published nearly forty articles, but only four of them centered around the investigative report on the cause and process of this incident, and many more focused on commenting, discussing, and debating. The reason for such a phenomenon to occur was partially because the media were not part of the judiciary institution. The more important reason being that they cared more about the significance of the incident, rather than the incident itself. As a result, the quest for truth behind the incident became irrelevant, and the discussion about the incident quickly turned into a platform for discussing the Chinese marriage problem, allowing the incident to grow influential. The New Cultural discourse put the blame of "Miss Zhao's suicide" on the traditional marriage system, and made Zhao Wuzhen both the victim of traditional marriage system, and the martyr of Chinese women's liberation.

== Individual reactions ==
As mentioned above, "Miss Zhao's Suicide" had incentivized widespread social discussion and debate regarding to women's rights and marital relationships. This social conversation was largely driven by intellectuals and activists from the New Culture Movement, who were hoping to utilize this incident as a symbol to call for women's liberation. The discussion and debate took in forms of individual writings, and the main platforms for conversation were newspaper agencies, including Da Gong Bao and Nü Jie Zhong.

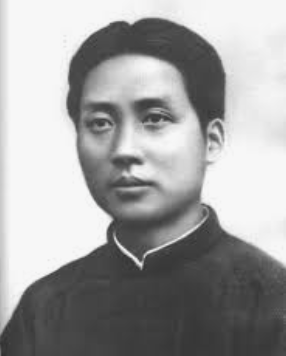
Young Mao Zedong

=== Mao Zedong ===
==== Personal Significance ====
Mao Zedong was at Changsha when this incident occurred. Mao immediately reckoned the importance of this event. From the third day after the incident, Mao drafted numerous articles that were published in Da Gong Bao to comment on this incident.

==== "Miss Zhao’s Suicide" ====
In his writing, "Miss Zhao's Suicide," Mao pin-pointed the cause of this incident to be the collective force of the society, Miss Zhao's family, and Miss Zhao's groom's family. Mao indicated that if any of these three causes was willing to respect Miss Zhao's personal wishes, her suicide could have been avoided. In his conclusive statement, Mao paraded Miss Zhao as a female youth who sacrificed her life for liberty and love, and he asked the entire society to call out the injustice that women had faced.

==== "The Question of Miss Zhao’s Personality" ====
In an article he wrote four days after the incident, titled “The Personality Problem of Miss Zhao,” Mao argued that the traditional system of family and marriage was suppressing individuals' personality ("人格", or personal dignity). Mao believed that Miss Zhao committed suicide because she found death to be more preferable to the absence of freedom. Mao urged his readers to celebrate Miss Zhao as a martyr for freedom, and condemned Miss Zhao's parents for their oppressive behaviors.

===== "The Evils of Society and Miss Zhao" =====
In the essay "The Evils of Society and Miss Zhao", Mao responds to critics of Miss Zhao, who disapproved of her decision to commit suicide. While Mao condemns suicide as an act, he encourages readers to consider why someone might turn to suicide, as opposed to other options. Particularly, he responds to the idea that Miss Zhao should have run away instead; he points out that there are very few public places for single women to go. He argues that Miss Zhao's decision to commit suicide was the result of a larger systematic problem. In his mind, a woman's parents should not force them to marry. However, even if her parents fail her and try to force her into a marriage she does not want, society as a whole should provide her other options besides suicide (i.e. make it easier and more acceptable for a young woman to be in the world alone).

==== "Concerning the Incident of Miss Zhao’s Suicide" ====
In another writing, "Concerning the Incident of Miss Zhao's Suicide," Mao briefly outlined his own vision for an ideal marriage system. Mao believed that the prior system of marriage allowed men to abuse women for giving birth and childbearing, for which he claimed are acts critical to human survival. He argued that the key to achieving women's own independence was embedded in the presence of love, rather than money, within marriage. Mao proposed ways to help women to be free and independent after marriage: he argued that "a woman must never marry before she is physically mature"; "a woman must be adequately prepared in knowledge and skills to live her own life" before marriage; and "a woman must prepare herself for living expenses after childbirth." In the end, Mao suggested the possibility of establishing "public child support," which he argued could contribute to having marital relationships centered on love.

==== Other Essays ====
Mao wrote two other, related essays in the days immediately following the death of Miss Zhao. The first, titled “The Marriage Question” (November 19, 1919), advocated for the end of arranged marriages by parents. The second, titled “Against Suicide” (November 23, 1919), rejects suicide as a practice, but encourages readers to consider why individuals pursue it.

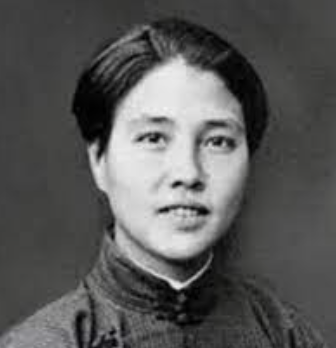
Tao Yi

=== Tao Yi ===
==== Personal Significance ====
Tao Yi (金天翮) was a famous female writer in early twentieth century China. Tao graduated from the Zhounan Women's School, and was regarded as an influential figure in the academia of Changsha, the city where the incident occurred.

==== "Commentary On Miss Zhao's Suicide" ====
Tao Yi published her writings regarding to "Miss Zhao's Suicide" on Nü Jie Zhong, or Women's Bell, under the pseudonym Si Yong. In her writing "Commentary on Miss Zhao's Suicide," Tao criticized the traditional marriage system for being responsible for Miss Zhao's suicide. She indicated that Miss Zhao's suicide was not a special, unique incident; there are countless other young women being forced to death under this wicked system. Moreover, Tao emphasized the lack of decision power owned by women in determining their own life, which made many of them choose a sudden death over a cruel life.

=== Comparing Two Opinions ===
Despite both criticizing the traditional marriage system, Tao believed that the significance of "Miss Zhao's Suicide" should have been more centered on reforming the marriage system instead of Mao's argument for a love of freedom. Tao argued that if Miss Zhao "were just a passive person trying to protect her own freedom, then why did she not commit suicide at the time she hid the knife, or while she rode in the sedan with her family to her sister's home? Why did she wait till she was in her bridal clothes, and sitting in her bridal sedan, to commit suicide?" Tao argued that her action of committing suicide on her trip to her groom's house should be interpreted as her deliberate attempt to protest against the vile marriage system.

=== Xiang Jingyu ===
Mao Zedong discussed Zhao's suicide with Xiang Jingyu and suggested that Xiang should hold a meeting to discuss women's perspectives on the issues. Xiang did so and delivered a speech in which denounced arranged marriage and advocated for women's liberation.

== Similar instances ==
Miss Zhao's story is not the only one of its kind. Female suicide had existed before her as a means of resistance, and would continue to be a way out for women after her.

=== Xi Shangzhen ===
Another notable suicide in China pertaining to the issue of women's oppression, was that of Xi Shangzhen in 1922. Her motives for killing herself were unclear, though many contend that it had to do with a problem with her boss, Tang Jiezhi. In fact, it was in his office that Xi Shangzhen hung herself with the cord of an electric tea kettle. She had recently lost money on the stock market, and it has been speculated that this economic loss is what spurred conflict with Tang Jiezhi. This case received substantial media attention due to its proximity with high-profile characters; Tang Jiezhi had been a prominent May Fourth activist. It was also one of the first prominent suicides of the “new woman”; Xi Shangzhen killed herself in the workplace likely due to economic matters, rather than in the home due to domestic matters. Many activist groups held up Xi Shangzhen as an example of what can happen to oppressed women. One group of male New Culture activists published an entire book of essays simply titled "Xi Shangzhen."

=== Li Chao ===
Li Chao was a student at the Beijing Women's Higher Normal School, who died of frail lung disease on August 16, 1919. Hu Shih, a literary scholar who taught at Beijing University at the time, wrote a long essay about Li's life story after close examinations on Li's personal diaries and letters. Hu's essay made this ordinary death into a public event that caught nationwide attention. In his essay, Hu attributed the cause of Li's death to her depression, which resulted from her lack of tuition for continuing her education. Hu heavily criticized Li's family for not supporting her to seek education solely because of her gender (her brother even claimed after her death that she did not deserve pity). Hu saw the death of Li as an epitome for the oppressive traditional family system, and believed that Li's case could be applied to a myriad of Chinese women. Since Hu's essay on Li Chao came out only a few weeks after Miss Zhao's suicide, the story of Li Chao quickly spread to Hunan, and was immediately compared to Zhao Wuzhen by the New Culture activists. These activists considered both Li and Zhao as women who sacrificed their life in order to protect their personality and liberation; both were granted with the same symbolic title as the "important martyrs in the history of Chinese feminism."
