= Battle of Yangxia =

Largest military engagement of the Xinhai Revolution

- Part of Xinhai Revolution
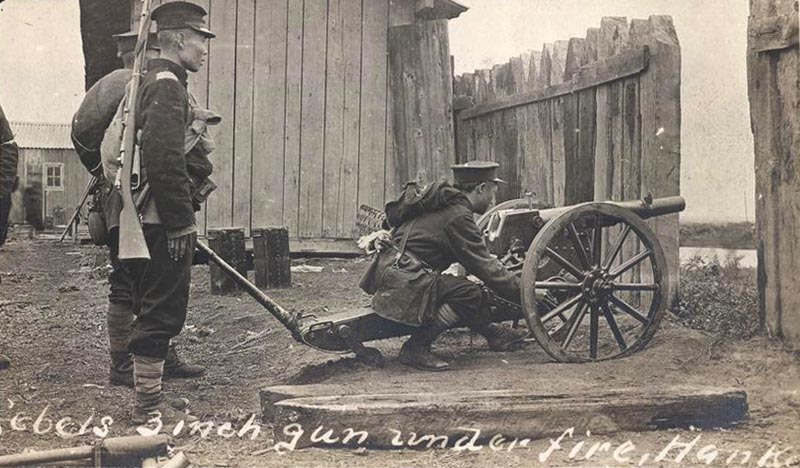
- Artillerymen of the Revolutionary Army take aim on Qing Army positions during the Battle of Yangxia.
Date	October 18 – November 27, 1911
Location	Wuhan, Hubei, China
Result	Qing victory: Qing capture of Hankou and Hanyang; Followed by a cease-fire and political negotiations with the revolutionaries

Belligerents
Qing dynasty: Beiyang Army; Imperial Chinese Navy	Hubei Revolutionary Army: Women's Revolutionary Army; Tongmenghui; Gongjinghui; Hunan Revolutionary Army

Commanders and leaders
(Qing dynasty) Yuan Shikai (Qing dynasty) Feng Guozhang (Qing dynasty) Duan Qirui (Qing dynasty) Yinchang (Qing dynasty) Sa Zhenbing	Li Yuanhong; Huang Xing

Units involved
1st Corps; 4th Division; 3rd Brigade; 11th Brigade; Sea-going fleet	8 infantry brigades and various other units; Later expanded to 8 divisions

Strength
25,000 troops; 1 cruiser (Hai Chen); Several gunboats	~100,000 troops

Casualties and losses
~10000+ casualties	~10000+ killed

The Battle of Yangxia (simplified Chinese: 阳夏之战; traditional Chinese: 陽夏之戰), also known as the Defense of Yangxia (simplified Chinese: 阳夏保卫战; traditional Chinese: 陽夏保衛戰), was the largest military engagement of the Xinhai Revolution and was fought from October 18 to November 27, 1911, between the revolutionaries of the Wuchang Uprising and the loyalist armies of the Qing dynasty. The battle was waged in Hankou and Hanyang, which along with Wuchang collectively form the tri-cities of Wuhan in central China. Though outnumbered by the Qing armies and possessing inferior arms, the revolutionaries fought valiantly in defense of Hankou and Hanyang. After heavy and bloody fighting, the stronger loyalist forces eventually prevailed by taking over both cities, but 41 days of determined resistance by the Revolutionary Army allowed the revolution to strengthen elsewhere as other provinces defied the Qing dynasty. The fighting ended after the commander-in-chief of the Qing forces, General Yuan Shikai, agreed to a cease-fire and sent envoys to peace talks with the revolutionaries. Political negotiations eventually led to the abdication of the Xuantong Emperor, the end of the Qing dynasty and the formation of a unity government for the newly established Republic of China.

== Background ==
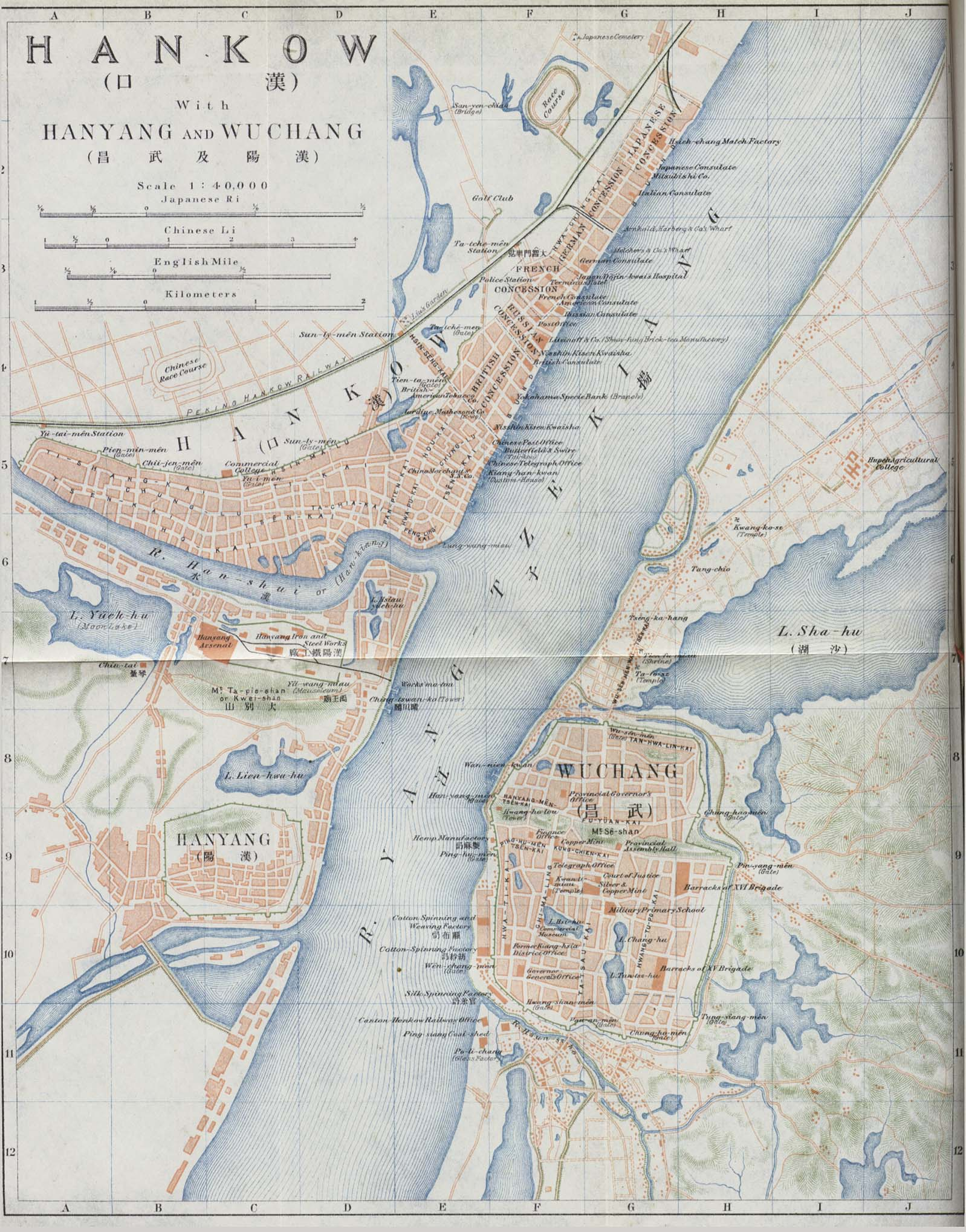
1915 Map of the tri-cities of Wuhan, with Hankou (Hankow) to the upper left, Hanyang to lower left and Wuchang, across the Yangtze River to the right. Hankou and Hanyang are divided by the Han River. Dazhimen (Ta-tche-men) Station is on the Beijing-Hankou (Peking-Hankow) Railway in Hankou. The green patch just south of the Han River represents the Guishan (Kwei-shan) Heights of Hanyang.

On October 10, 1911, revolutionaries in Wuchang launched an uprising against the Qing dynasty. They quickly seized Hankou and Hanyang, on the north bank of the Yangtze River, and made Li Yuanhong their commander. On October 14, the Qing court in Beijing ordered Yinchang and Feng Guozhang to lead the Beiyang Army, the strongest military unit of the regime, against the uprising in Wuhan. Sa Zhenbing, commander of the Qing Navy, was ordered to sail from Qinhuangdao to Shanghai and then up the Yangtze River to Wuhan to assist with military operations. The Qing court also recalled Yuan Shikai, the founder of the Beiyang Army, from retirement and made him the Viceroy of Huguang, but did not initially vest him with formal powers. Yuan had been forced into retirement in 1908 because the court feared that he wielded undue influence.

== The Battle of Hankou ==
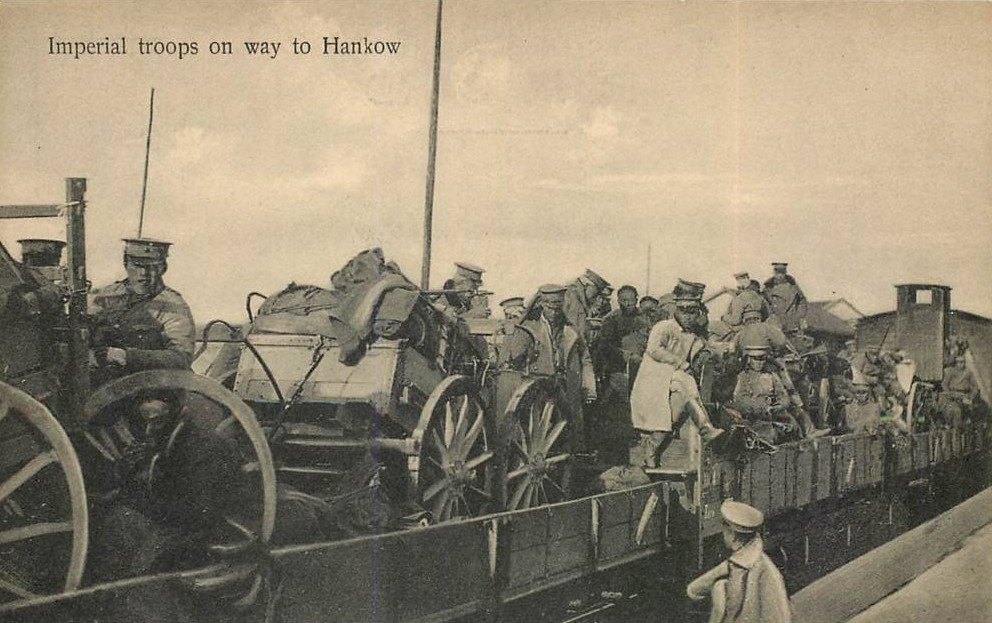
The Imperial Beiyang Army traveling by rail to recapture Hankou.

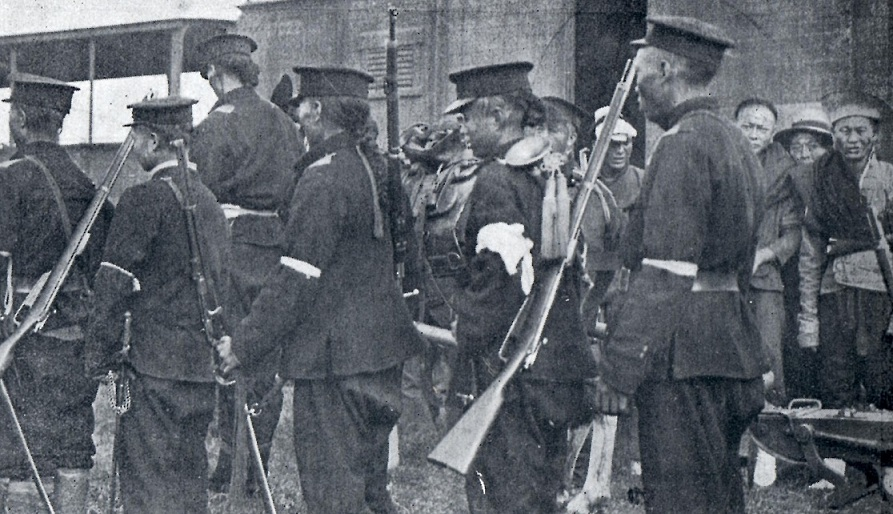
Soldiers of the Revolutionary Army marching past residents in Wuchang.

Yinchang, a Manchu noble, reached Hankou by rail and attempted to seize control of the city's northern suburbs. On October 18 more than 1,000 revolutionary fighters attacked Liujiamiao, a train station guarding the northern approach to Hankou, but were driven back and retreated to Dazhimen. In the afternoon the revolutionaries regrouped and, with the help of railway workers, ambushed a train carrying Qing troops heading south. The train derailed and sent the Qing troops fleeing, and more than 400 were killed by revolutionaries. The following day the revolutionary forces, supplemented by enthusiastic volunteers, grew to more than 5,000 and captured Liujiamiao. The revolutionaries on October 20 tried to press on to Wushengguan further north but were driven back with serious losses. Nevertheless, their victory at Liujiamiao boosted the morale of the revolutionary movement. On October 22 Hunan and Shaanxi Province both declared their independence from the Qing regime.

Following the setback at Liujiamiao, the Qing court removed Yinchang from command and handed formal power to Yuan Shikai, whose lieutenants in the Beiyang Army, Feng Guozhang and Duan Qirui, headed the 1st and 2nd Armies moving on Wuhan, respectively. On October 26, the Beiyang Army moved swiftly south by rail and attacked the northern suburbs of Hankou with heavy artillery and machine guns. The revolutionaries suffered over 500 killed in action and were also hampered by indecisive leadership from Zhang Jingliang, who was suspected of collaborating with the Qing government. The revolutionaries lost and then regained Liujiamiao, only to lose it to Qing troops on October 27. The Qing armies pressed into the city and the two sides engaged in fierce house-to-house fighting.

On October 28 Huang Xing and Song Jiaoren, two leaders of the Tongmenghui or Revolutionary Alliance, arrived in Hankou from Shanghai to support the revolutionaries. On the 29th Huang led over 1,000 reinforcements to Wuchang, which had 6,000 revolutionaries holding out against superior Qing forces. Due to inferior arms the revolutionaries suffered heavy casualties, but were supported by local residents. In retaliation, Feng Guozhang ordered the razing of Hankou. The fire burned for three days and destroyed much of the city. By November 1 Qing troops controlled Hankou. Both sides suffered casualties in the thousands.

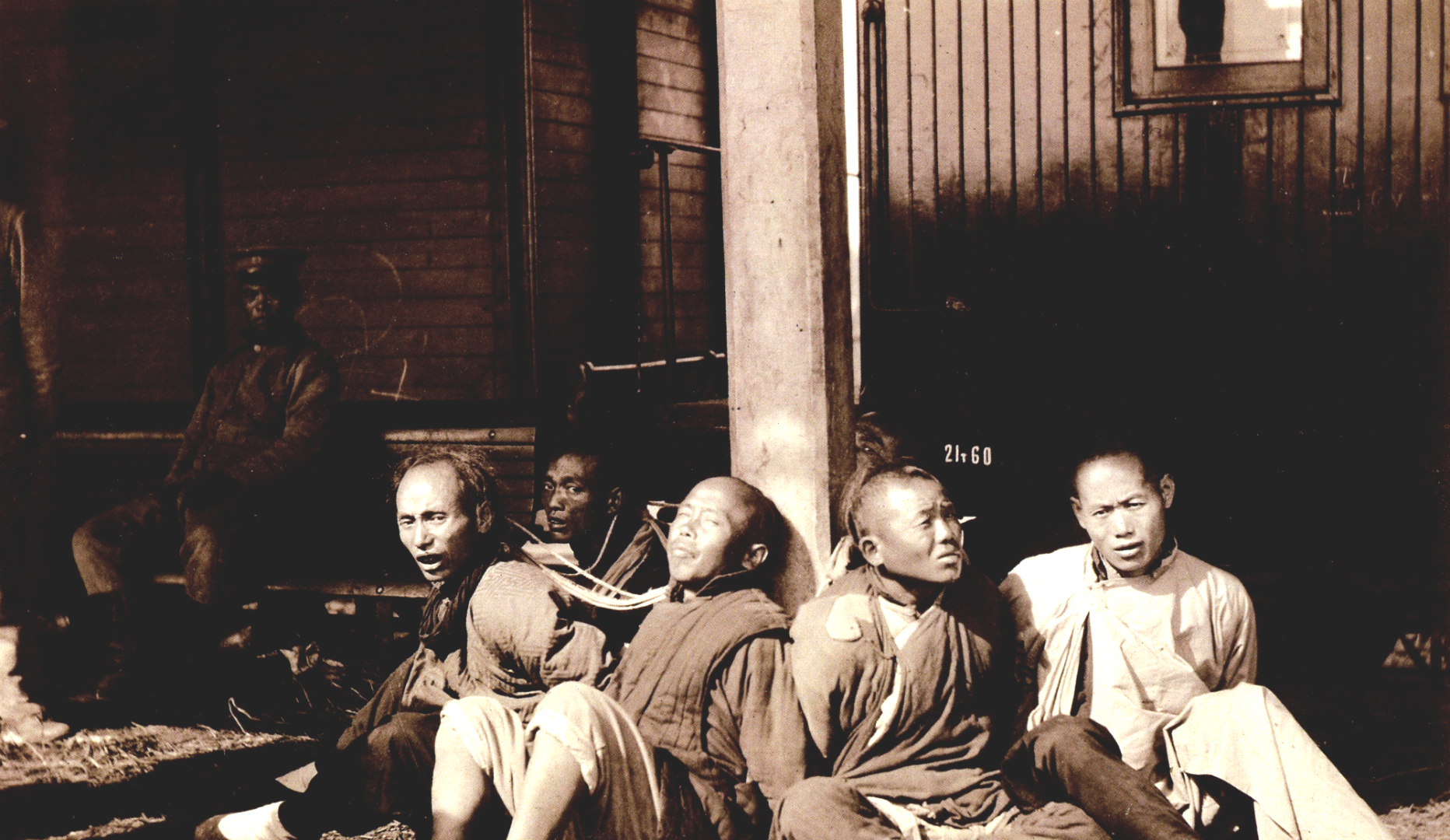
Captured Revolutionary Army soldiers in Hankou.

On November 3 Li Yuanhong handed the command of the revolutionary forces to Huang Xing. Their strength was boosted by the arrival of revolutionaries from Hunan. By then 11 provinces had broken away from the Qing regime. The Qing Navy had also defected, sending some ships to assist the Jiangsu-Zhejiang Revolutionary Army's siege of Nanjing and other ships to support the revolutionaries in Wuhan. In Hanyang the revolutionaries had 13,000 soldiers arrayed against 30,000 Qing troops across the Han River in Hankou. Huang Xing, against the advice of Sun Wu and others who favored defending Hanyang, attempted to retake Hankou. Yuan Shikai, on the other side of the river, was determined to press the Qing military's local advantage to halt the momentum of the revolution nationwide. On November 17 the revolutionaries shelled Hankou from the Guishan heights in Hanyang and crossed the Han River in a two-pronged attack. The revolutionaries' artillery was inaccurate and their right flank was halted by an artillery barrage from the Qing army. The left flank crossed the river alone, met stiff resistance from superior Qing forces, and was forced to retreat on the evening of the 18th, having suffered over 800 casualties.

== The Battle of Hanyang ==
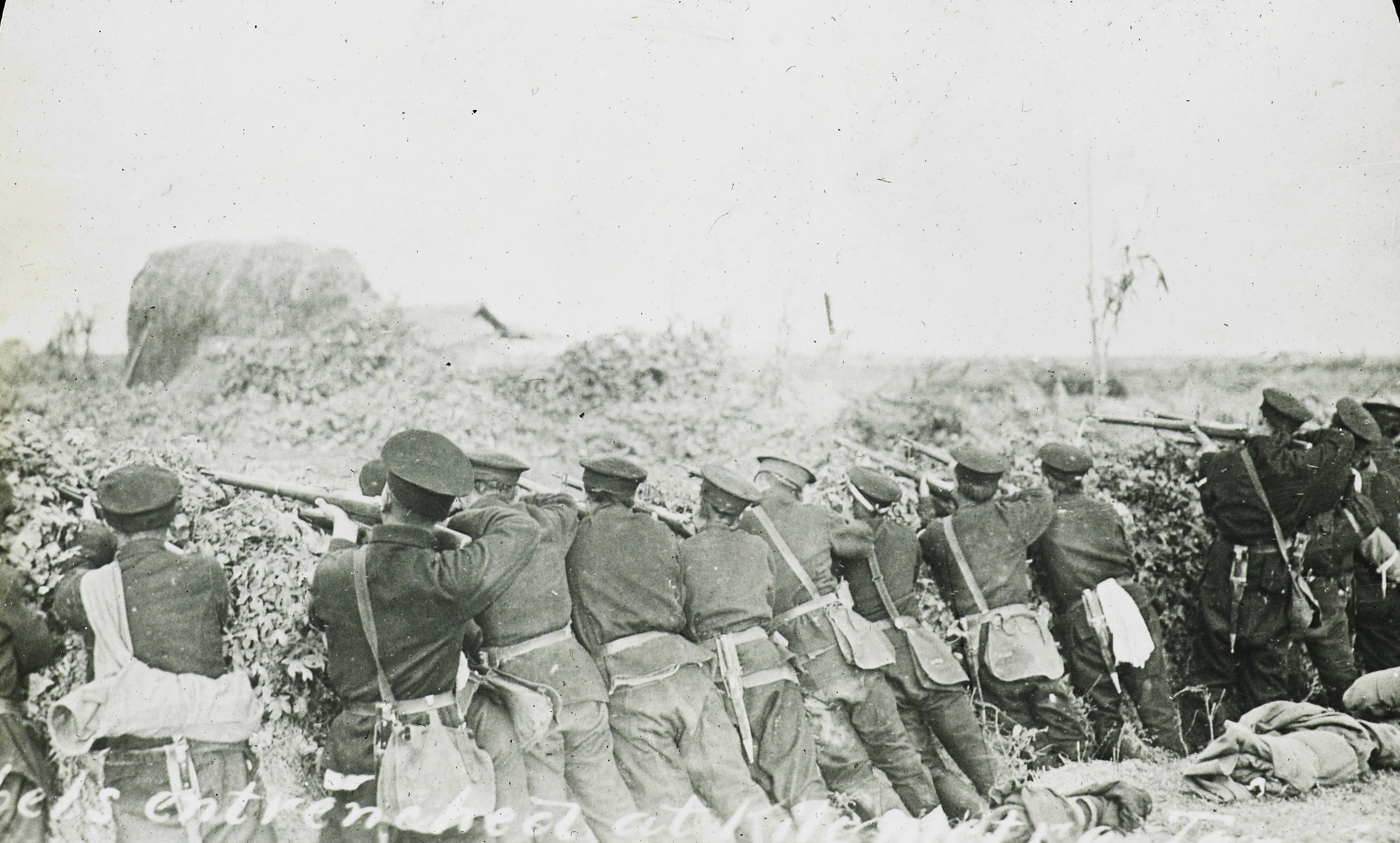
The Revolutionary Army firing from entrenched positions at Shilipu in Hanyang.

On November 21 the Qing armies launched their invasion of Hanyang. One force bypassed the revolutionaries' defense by striking from Xiaogan further to the west. The two sides clashed at Sanyanqiao. On November 22 another Qing force managed to cross the Han River from Hankou and eventually captured the strategic heights in Hanyang. The revolutionaries twice sent reinforcements from Wuchang across the Yangtze River to Hanyang but suffered heavy casualties en route. Another group of revolutionaries in Wuchang planned to cross the Yangtze River to Hankou and then attack Liujiamiao behind Qing lines, but the commander of this group was drunk and did not join the assault force, which faced heavy Qing artillery barrages from the opposite bank and could not land. The Hunan reinforcements were so disgusted by what they perceived as efforts by the Hubei revolutionaries to preserve their strength, that they left the front lines and returned to Hunan, despite efforts by Li Yuanhong to clarify the misunderstanding. After seven days and nights of fierce house-to-house combat, the Qing forces gradually fought their way into the city center, capturing the Hanyang munitions factory and the revolutionaries' artillery positions on Guishan. On November 27, the revolutionaries retreated from Hanyang. Over 3,300 revolutionary fighters and residents died defending Hanyang.

== Cease-fire ==
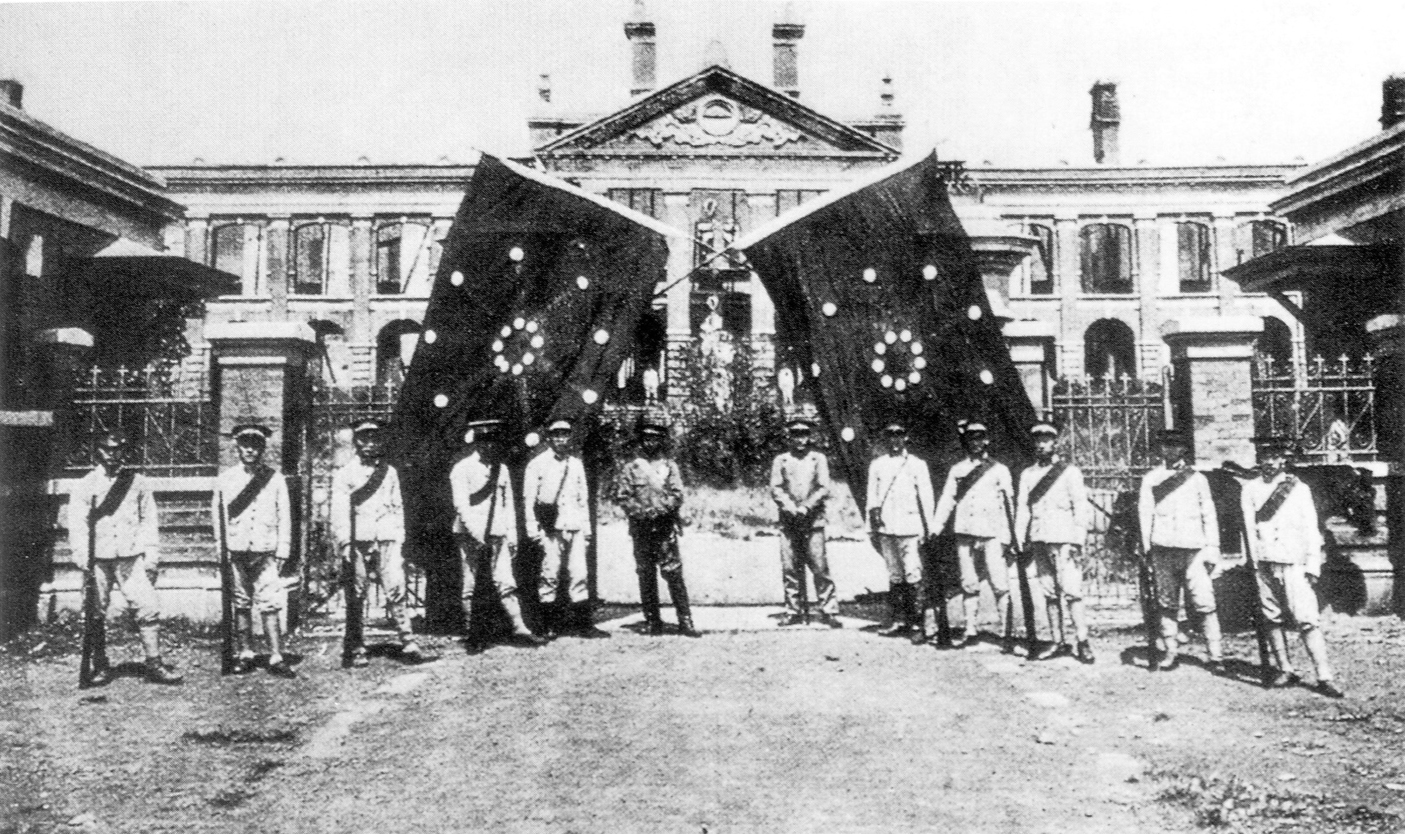
The Revolutionary Army with the 19-Point Army Flag, outside the headquarters of the Republic of China Military Government in Wuchang in 1911.

At the end of November Feng Guozhang and Duan Qirui prepared and submitted plans to Yuan Shikai to take Wuchang. By then, despite Qing advantages in Wuchang, Sichuan had seceded from the Qing regime and revolutionaries were threatening to take Nanjing and Shanxi. On the evening of December 1 Yuan Shikai agreed to a three-day cease-fire and began talks with the revolutionaries in Hankou. The cease-fire was extended by another three days, then by 15 days, and finally to the end of December. On December 18 Yuan sent envoys on behalf of the Qing court to negotiations in Shanghai. On December 25, 1911, Sun Yat-Sen returned to Shanghai from exile, and founded the Republic of China on January 1, 1912. He agreed to hand over the presidency of the provisional government to Yuan Shikai in exchange for the latter's assistance in securing the abdication of the last Qing Emperor. When this was done on February 12, 1912, the Qing dynasty formally ended its 267-year reign in China.

With the cease-fire of December 1, 1911, the conflict moved from the military arena to the political one. This was a politically calculated decision of Yuan Shikai, who understood that if the revolution, which had him indispensable to the regime, were to be fully suppressed, he would again be destined to retirement. At the same time, at the Battle of Yangxia, he had demonstrated that his Beiyang Army was the most powerful in China. With his personal power at its height, he chose to maneuver politically to place himself at the top of the new political regime.

== Significance & aftermath ==
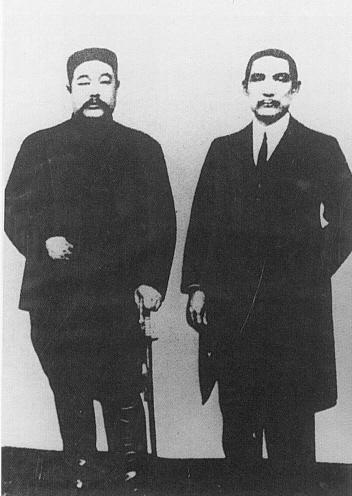
Li Yuanhong and Sun Yat-sen in Wuchang in April 1912 after the Xinhai Revolution had succeeded in toppling the Qing dynasty.

During the 41-day battle, 13 other Chinese provinces joined the revolution and declared their independence from the Qing dynasty. Peace talks were held in the British concession of Hankou and then moved to Shanghai in late December. The political negotiations eventually led to the abdication of the last Qing Emperor, Puyi, and the formation of a united provisional government of the Republic of China led by former loyalist Yuan Shikai and revolutionaries Sun Yat-sen, Li Yuanhong and Huang Xing. In October 1912 Yuan conferred honors to commanders on both sides of the battle for their contribution to the founding of the Republic. A memorial in Wuhan was built to commemorate those who died, including 4,300 unknown soldiers, in the battle.

== Gallery ==
The Japanese wartime artist T. Minyano created a series of lithographic print illustrations of the battle, which were printed in Japan in 1920.

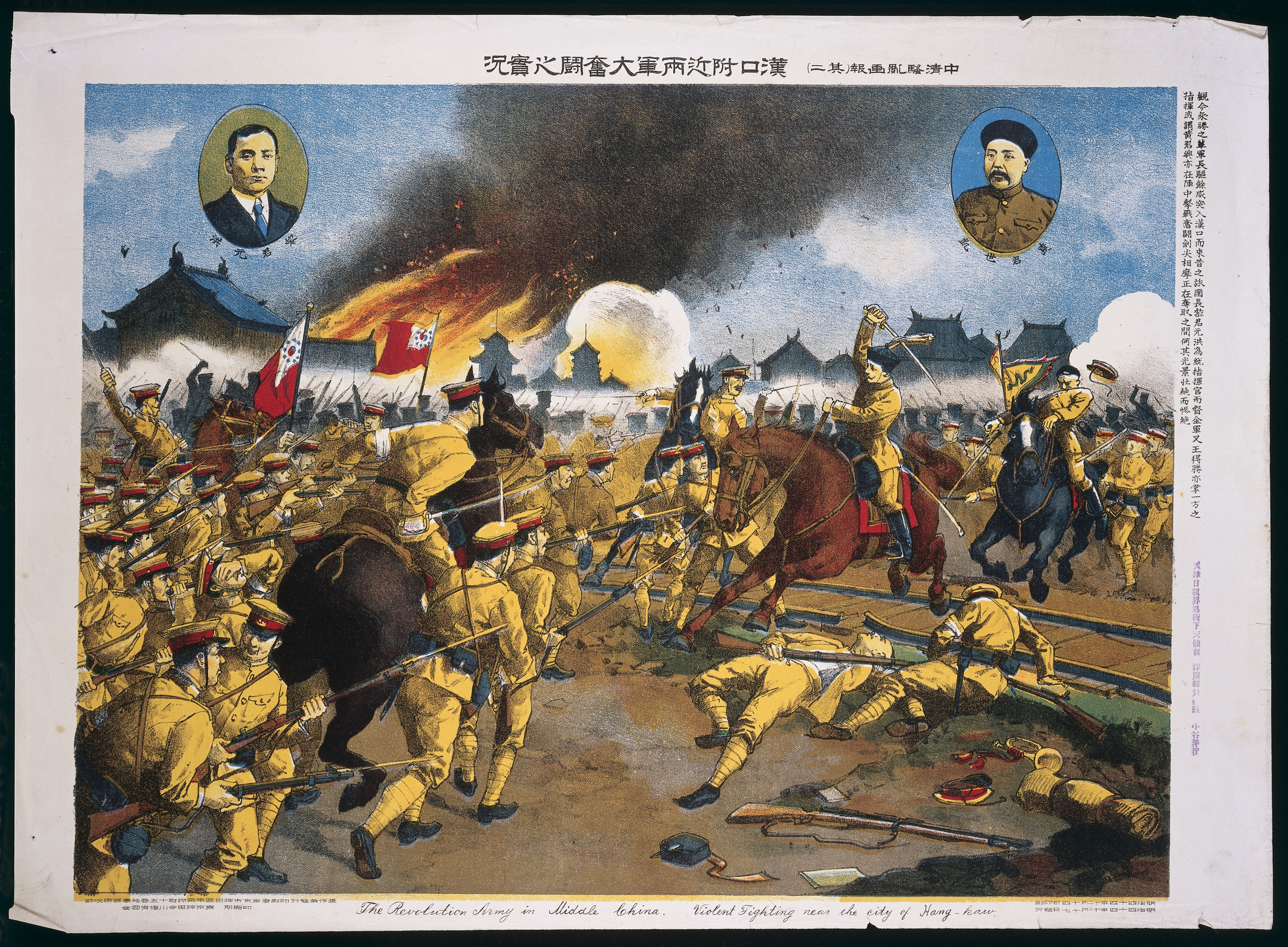
Battle of Hankou

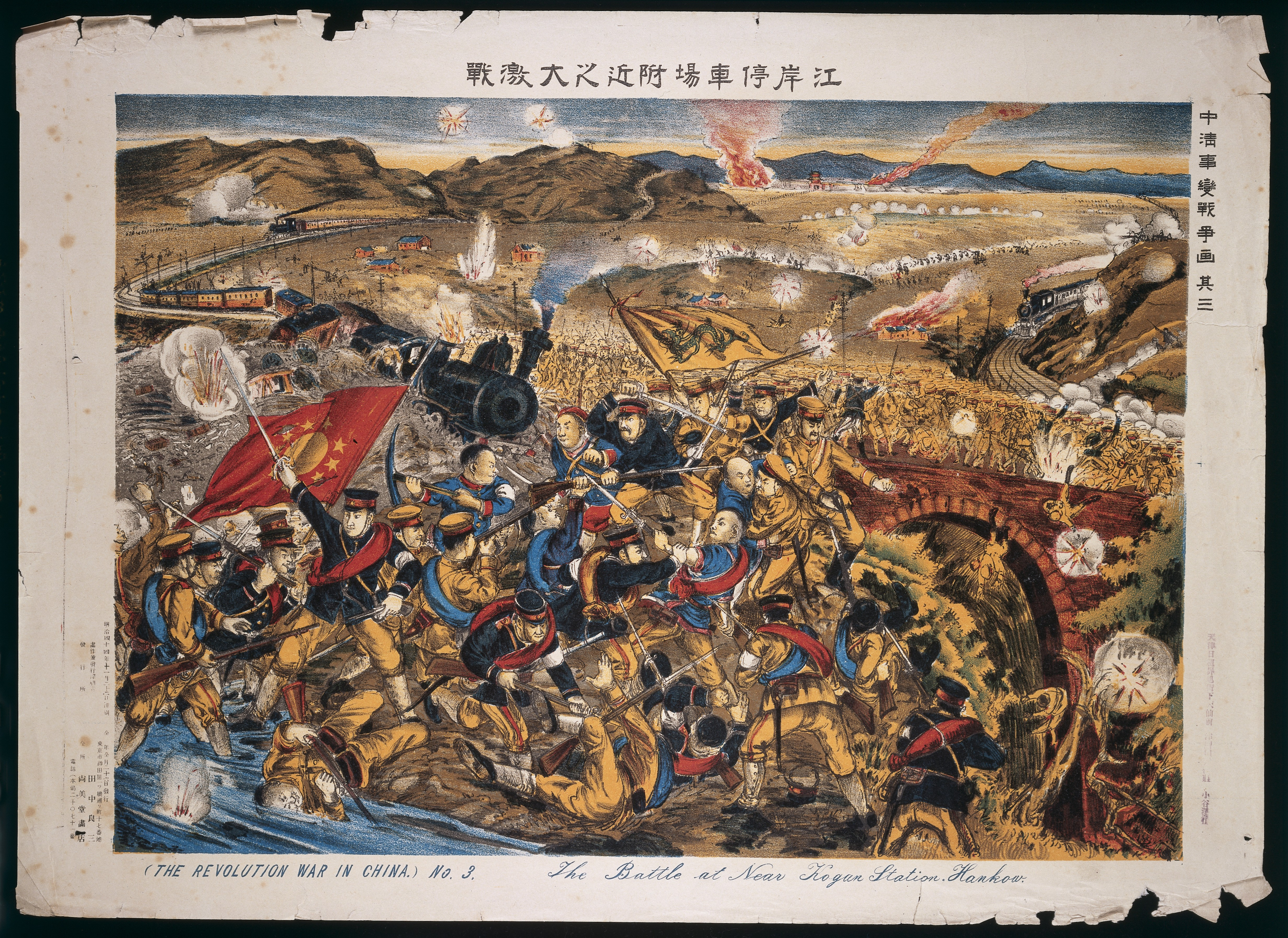
Ambush of Imperial forces at Liujiamiao.

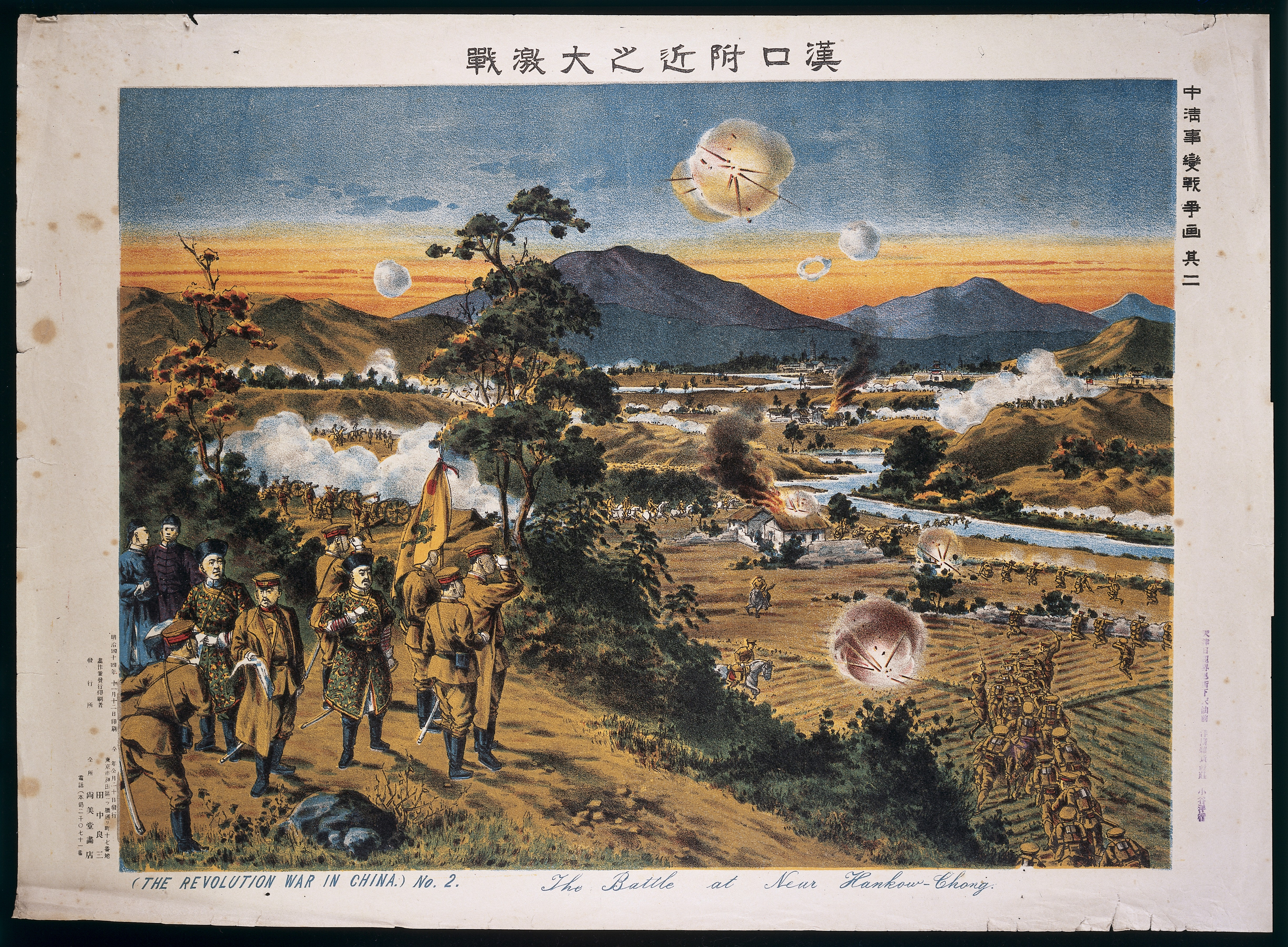
Battle of Hankou from the Imperial Army lines.

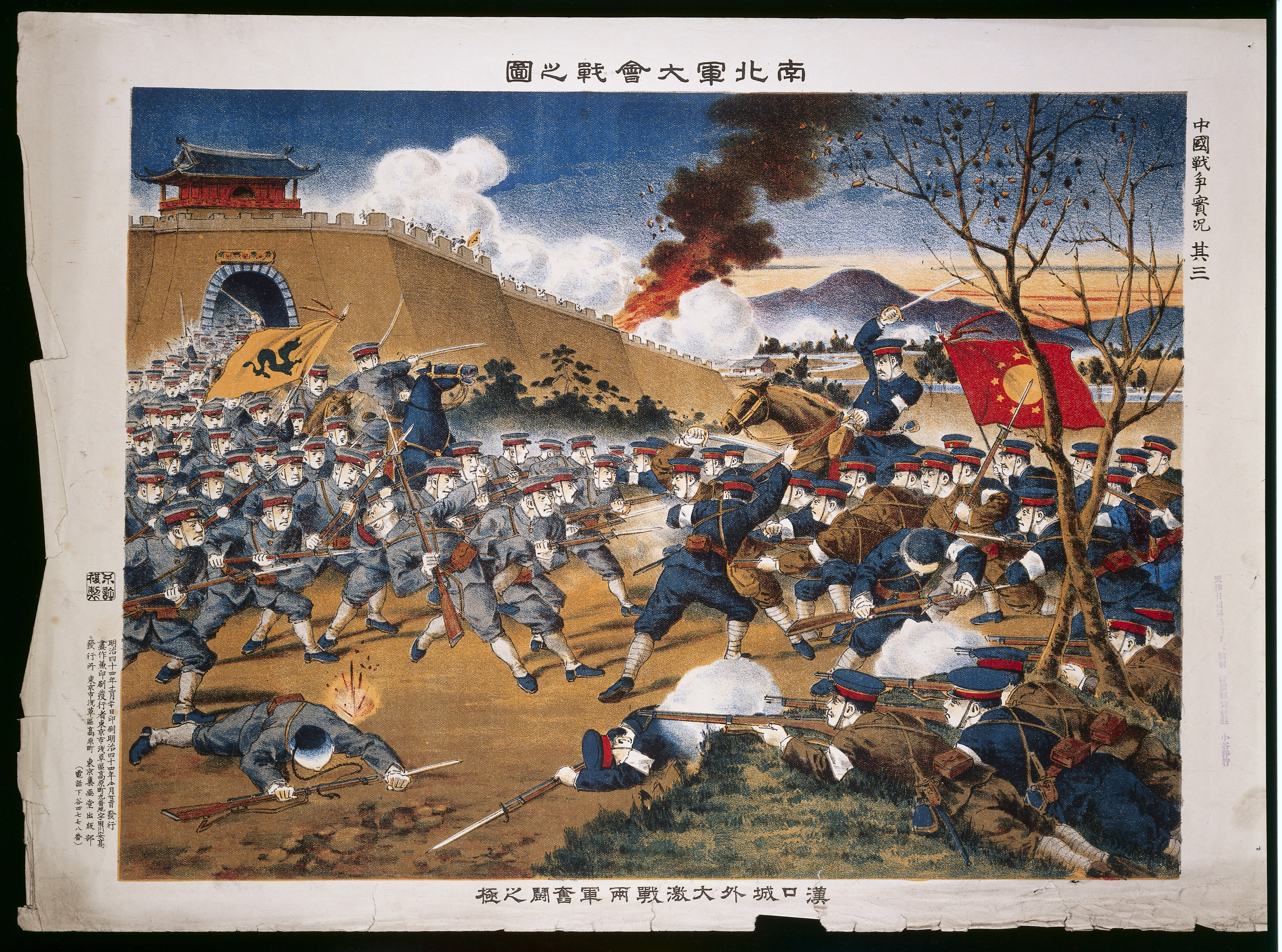
Battle of Hankou (2)

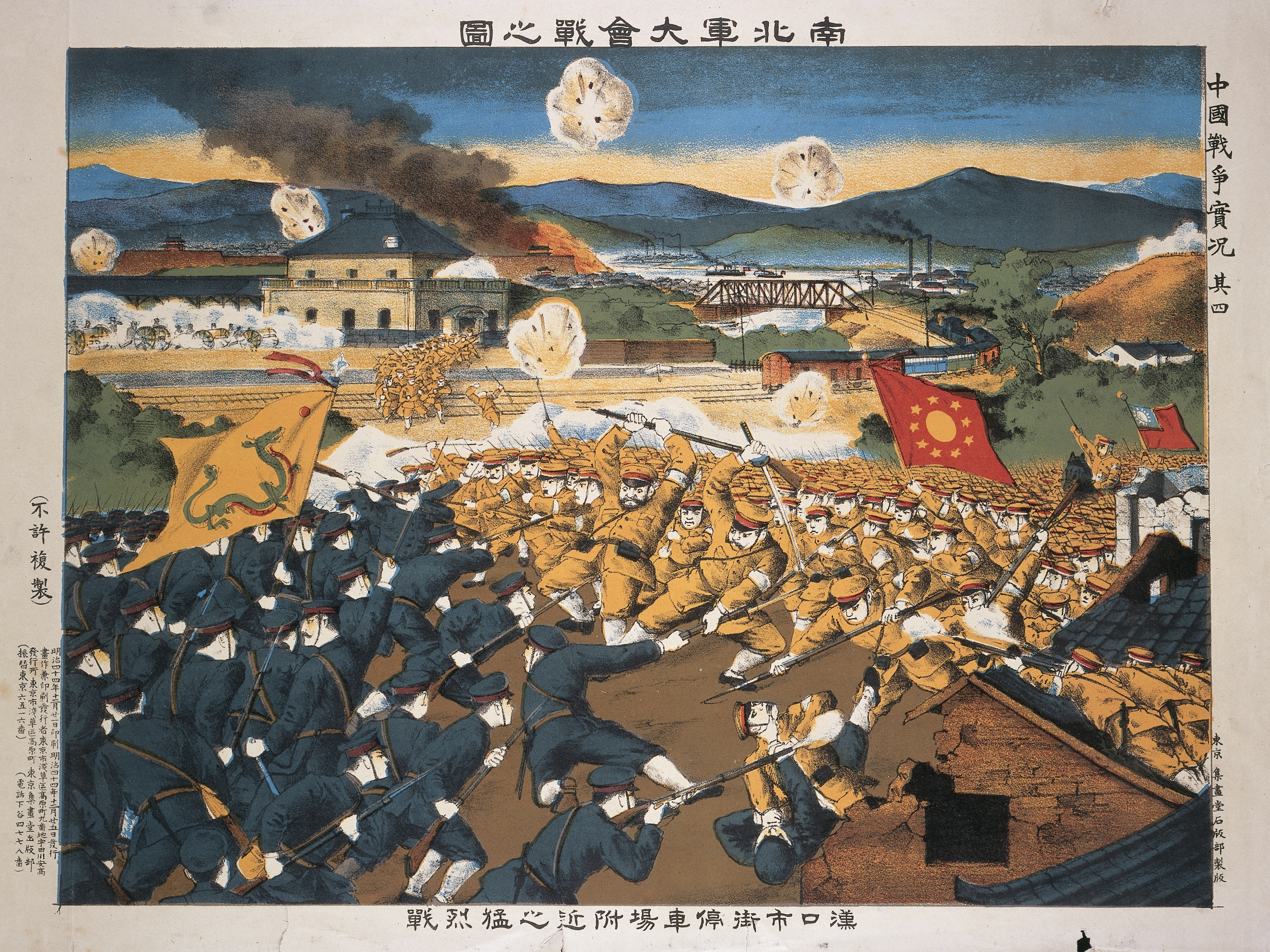
Fighting in Hankou's rail yards

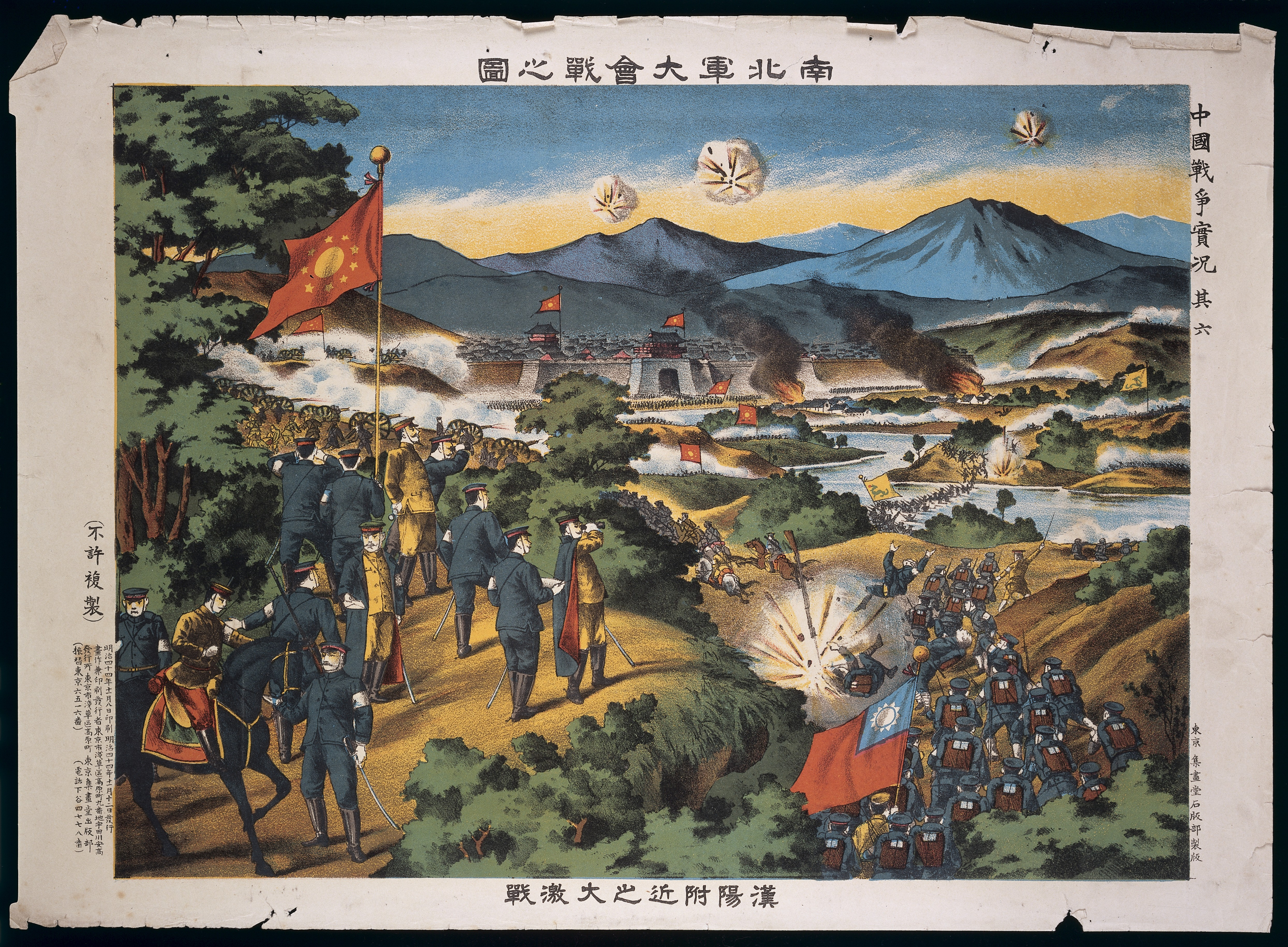
Fighting near Hanyang

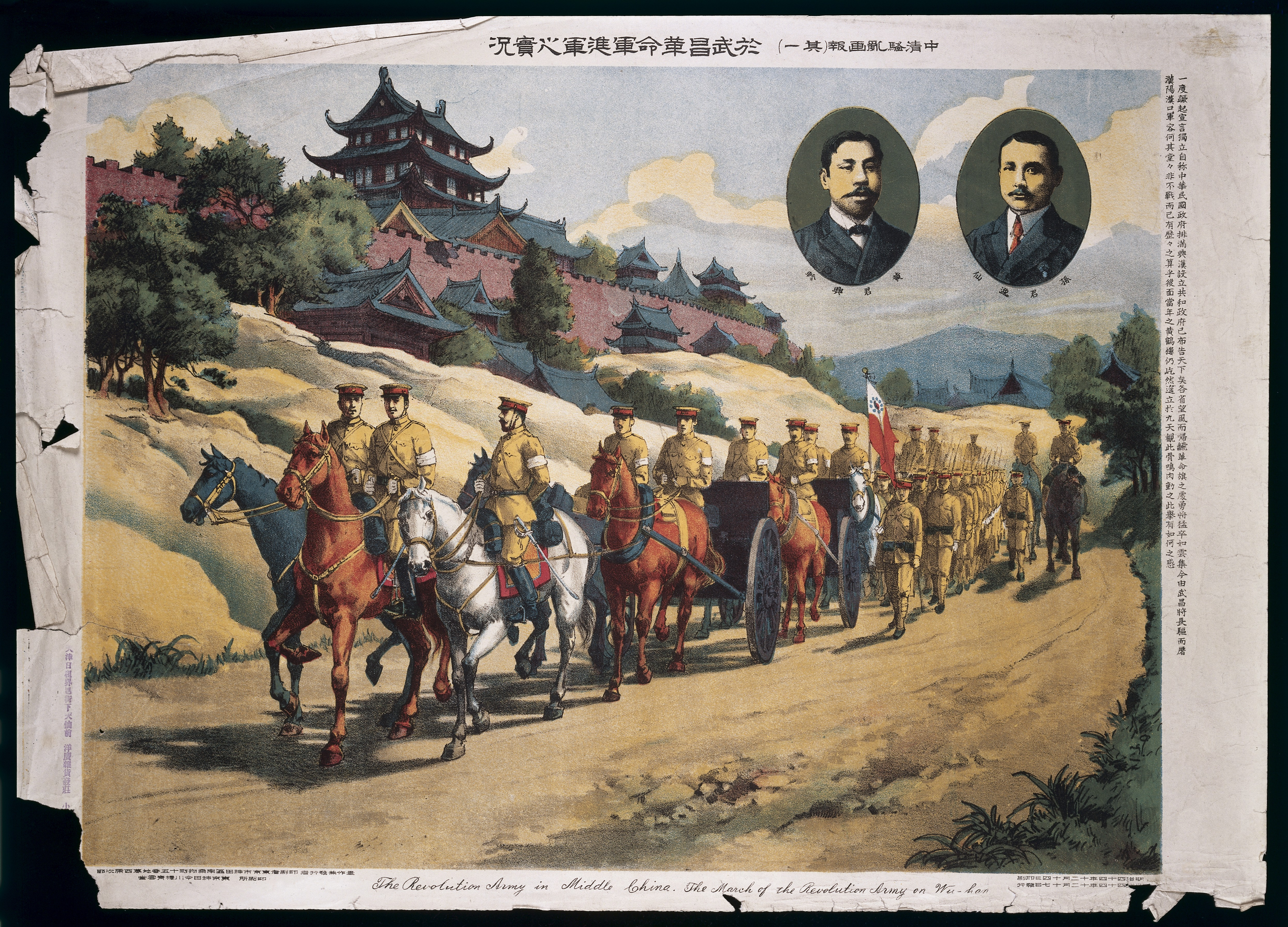
The revolutionary army marches on Wuchang

== See also ==
- Wuchang Uprising
- Xinhai Revolution
