= 6B4T movement =

Feminist movement in South Korea

The 6B4T movement is an online radical feminist movement that spread from South Korea whose members organize in opposition to sexism and patriarchal structures. A notable aspect of the 6B4T movement is its members' commitment to never marry men, or have heterosexual sexual relations, nor bear children.

== Beliefs ==
Beginning in 2019, the movement grew out of the South Korean 4B movement, whose members also renounce sex, child-rearing, dating, and marriage with men. In Korean-language abbreviation, "6B" refers to the same four commandments of the 4B movement as well as not buying products viewed as sexist (Korean: 비소비; Hanja: 非消費; RR: bisobi) and supporting others in the movement (비돕비; 非돕非; bidopbi), while "4T" refers to rejecting strict beauty standards (탈코르셋; 脫corset; talkoreuset), hypersexual depictions of women in Japanese otaku culture (탈오타쿠; 脫otaku; tarotaku), religion (탈종교; 脫宗敎; taljonggyo), and idol culture (탈아이돌; 脫idol; taraidol).

== Around the world ==
=== China ===
The 6B4T movement spread to young female users of the Chinese social network Douban and became popular among well-educated women. It was a fringe element in the Chinese feminist movement, but it gained additional unintended attention in 2021 for the fact that it caught the attention of Chinese government censors. In April of that year, several Douban groups associated with the movement were shut down and the phrase "6B4T" was banned from the platform.

== See also ==
- Feminism in South Korea
- WOMAD
- 4B movement
- Political lesbianism
- Feminism in China
