= Feminist Voices =

Chinese feminist media network

Feminist Voices 女权之声
- Former editors: Lü Pin, Xiong Jing, Xu Zaozao
- Categories: Feminism
- Circulation: 181,019 Followers
- Founder: Lü Pin (吕频）
- First issue: September 2009
- Final issue: March 8, 2018
- Company: Media Monitor For Women Network
- Country: People's Republic of China
- Based in: Beijing, China
- Language: Chinese

Feminist Voices (officially known as "女权之声" in Chinese) was a feminist media in China. It was founded in 2009 by Chinese feminist activist Lü Pin (Chinese: 吕频). It was permanently banned by censors in 2018. It played a role in China's grassroots feminist movement and the #MeToo Movement in China.

== History ==
In March 1996, the Beijing Women Journalists Association founded the Media Monitor For Women Network (The "Network").

In 2010, the Network started to use social media to reach a larger audience. In April 2011, they officially changed their name from Women's Voices to Feminist Voices.

In 2012, Feminist Voices began supporting campaigns on women's rights. Feminist Voices formed a close partnership with young feminist activists across China, providing support in communication, training and feminist discourse analysis.

=== Misogynistic TV Gala ("女权大战春晚") ===
Feminist Voices started an online campaign protesting discrimination in China Central Television's ("CCTV") Annual Chinese New Year Gala show, and quickly garnered 1,300 signatures before it was blocked by censors.

=== Suspension ===
On February 22, Feminist Voices's Weibo account was suspended by Sina.com for 30 days. Feminist Voices posted on another social media account the notice they received from Weibo. The notice said "Hello, because the content you recently posted violates national laws and regulations, your account will be banned for 30 days."

Xiong Jing, an editor from Feminist Voices said Weibo had not been "very specific" about its motivations but "we are guessing that it's because we sent out some tweets calling for a women's strike action against Trump". This coordinated strike, which was in conjunction with the 2017 Women's March on Washington, is called "A Day Without a Woman".

=== Permanent Ban ===
On March 8, 2018 International Women's Day, Feminist Voices was permanently banned on both Weibo and WeChat, China's top two most influential social media platforms.

Its Weibo public account administrator received a notice on the evening of March 8, 2018 that the account had been suspended "over irregularities", and that "the account needs to be reactivated to resume its normal function". Followers found they could not access Feminist Voices WeChat public account. The public account was replaced by a WeChat notice saying that after complaints, WeChat decided to remove the account because it "had violated temporary regulations on the development and management of accounts offering public information service on instant messaging programs".
