= Yu Zhengxie =

Chinese philosopher (1775–1840)

- 兪正燮
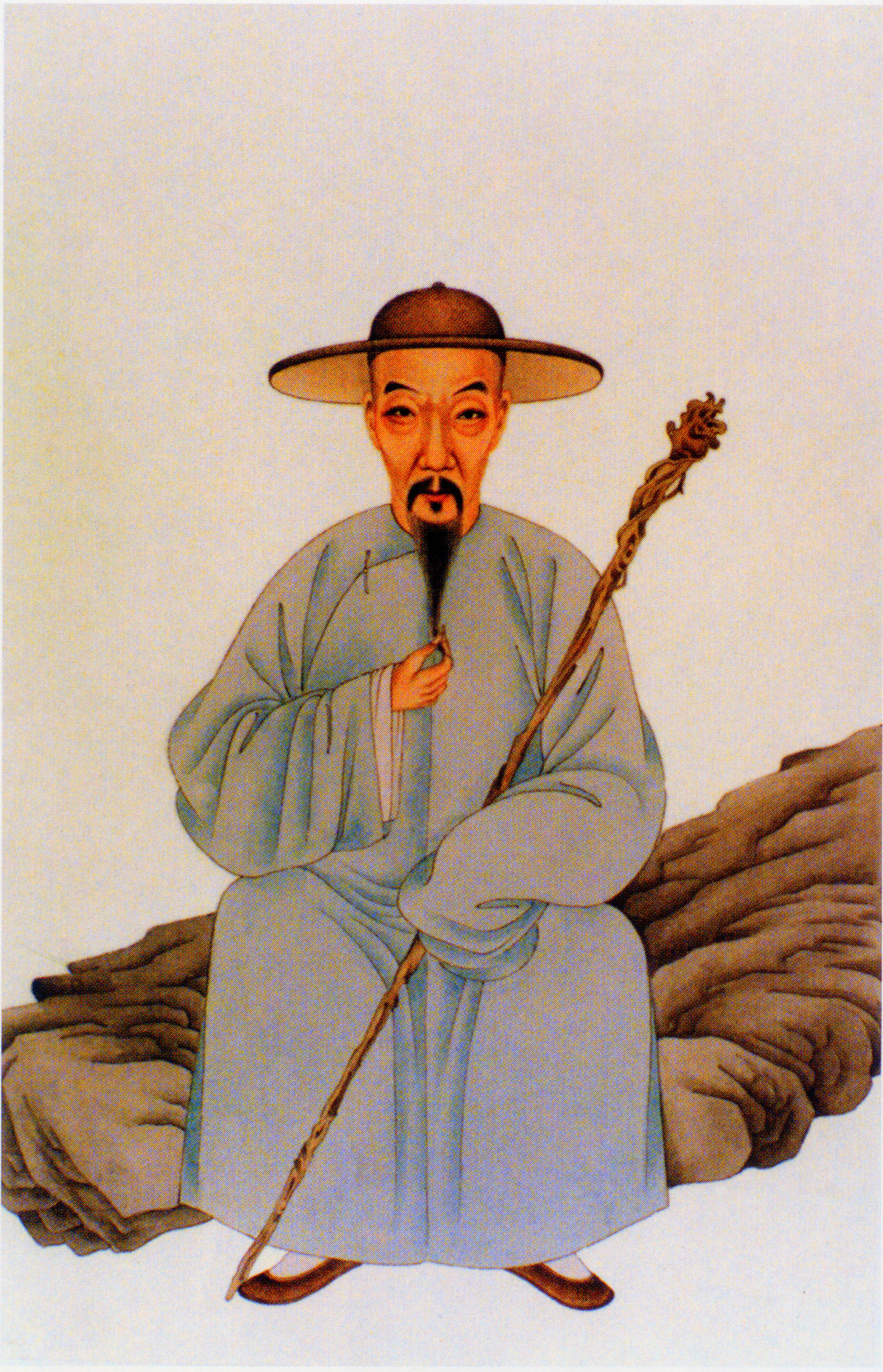
- Yu Zhengxie in Portraits of Qing Dynasty Scholars (vol. 2, 1953; reprint ed., 2001)
- Born: 1775; Yi County, Anhui, Qing dynasty
- Died: 1840 (aged 64–65); Jinling, Jiangsu
- Other names: Courtesy name: Li Chu (理初)
- Occupation(s): Philosopher, scholar, philologist, writer

Chinese name
Transcriptions
Standard Mandarin
- Hanyu Pinyin: Yú Zhèngxiè
- Wade–Giles: Yü Cheng-hsieh

Yu Zhengxie (1775–1840) was a Qing dynasty scholar from Yi county in modern-day Anhui province. Along with his philological work, he was a noted critic of foot binding, female infanticide, and the cult of widow chastity.

== Biography ==
Yu Zhongxie was born in Yi county, but he grew up in Jurong, Jiangsu, where his father Yu Xian (1750–1801) served as sub-director of schools from 1778 to 1794. While in Beijing, Yu assisted Ye Mingchen in the compilation of the 1818 edition of the Collected Statutes of the Great Qing, and also wrote a history of his hometown. In 1821, he was a successful candidate in the imperial provincial examination, obtaining the rank of juren. Despite his wide learning and exceptional memory, he was unsuccessful in the metropolitan examination of 1833.

For his stance on women's issues, Lin Yutang regarded him as one of the three pre-modern Chinese male feminists along with Yuan Mei and Li Ruzhen. A skilled philologist, Yu researched the history of language, which influenced his views on women. According to his interpretation, Chinese historical texts supported an egalitarian view of marriage. He also wrote about the island of Taiwan, religion in Tibet, and the relationship between Tibet and the Manchus.
