= Wu Shuqing (revolutionary) =

Chinese feminist, nationalist and revolutionary

- 吳淑卿
- Born: 1892; Hanyang, Qing China
- Died: Unknown
- Military career
- Allegiance: Chinese revolutionaries
- Branch: Chinese Women's Army
- Service years: 1911–12
- Commands: Women's Revolutionary Army
- Conflicts: Xinhai Revolution: Battle of Hankou; Battle of Nanjing (1911)

Wu Shuqing (Chinese: 吳淑卿; 1892 – unknown) was a Chinese feminist, nationalist and revolutionary who formed and led one of the first all-female rebel militias of the Xinhai Revolution in 1911. A 19-year-old student at the time, Wu managed to convince Li Yuanhong, the revolutionaries' commander-in-chief, to allow her to raise the "Women's Revolutionary Army" which eventually counted between 100 and several hundred members. Despite having almost no military experience, Wu proved to be a capable commander and personally led her unit into combat during the Battles of Hankou and Nanjing, achieving some fame among the Chinese rebels in the process. Nevertheless, her unit was disbanded after the revolution and Wu's later life is unknown.

== Life ==
=== Background ===
Wu was born to Han Chinese parents at Hanyang, Hubei, in 1892. Noted for her physical strength, bravery and intelligence by contemporaries, Wu was deeply convinced of gender equality and believed that every citizen, regardless of gender, should support and defend their nation. In her case, that meant fighting for the "Great Han nation" against foreign powers and the ruling Qing dynasty. She regarded the latter as "Manchu bastards" who suppressed the Han Chinese.

=== Formation of the Women's Revolutionary Army ===
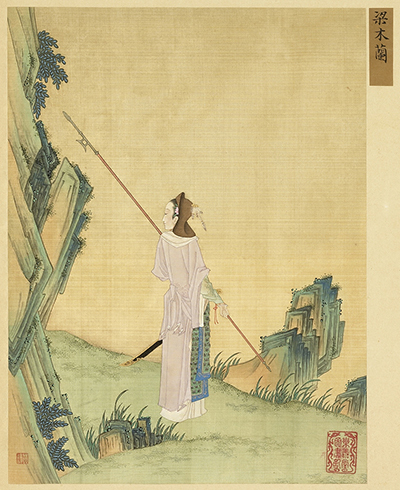
Due to her readiness to take up arms in order to fight for the Xinhai Revolution against the Manchu Qing dynasty, contemporaries likened Wu Shuqing to Hua Mulan, a legendary Chinese woman warrior.

When the Wuchang Uprising against the Qing government broke out in October 1911, Wu was 19 and attended Hanyang's Fengtian Normal College. Soon after the uprising's start, she sent a letter to the revolutionaries' commander-in-chief, Li Yuanhong, proposing the formation of an armed female brigade to aid the rebels. Though other women would also take up arms as the revolution spread, Wu was believed to have been the first to suggest the formation of a women's army. Li initially rejected this proposal, believing that it would be difficult to incorporate women into the all-male rebel army. Wu refused to accept this, and sent the general a second letter on 31 October while simultaneously publishing her views in the Minli Newspaper. She stated that her desire to join battle did not stem from desire for "momentary glory". Instead, she considered it her duty to fight for the revolution and, if necessary, die in battle. She reasoned that since men of every societal class and region were joining the rebels, it was not justifiable to exclude women, especially since many of the latter had trained in the gymnasia to prepare themselves for the physical demands of war. Following this second letter and requests by other militant women who wanted to fight for the revolution, Li relented and gave Wu the permission to raise an all-female unit.

Wu then posted notices for her unit in Hanyang, while like-minded women produced propaganda for her militia. For example, Liu Wangli likened Wu to the legendary woman warrior Hua Mulan in order to inspire other women to enlist. The recruitment drive was a success, and hundreds women tried to join Wu's unit. Most of these potential recruits were students with a middle-class background, some of them with bound feet. Historians differ on how many Wu's unit, the so-called "Women's Revolutionary Army", eventually numbered; according to Louise Edwards it was about 100, whereas Ono Kazuko and Fan Hong report that "perhaps as many as several hundred women" fought under Wu's command.

=== Combat and later life ===
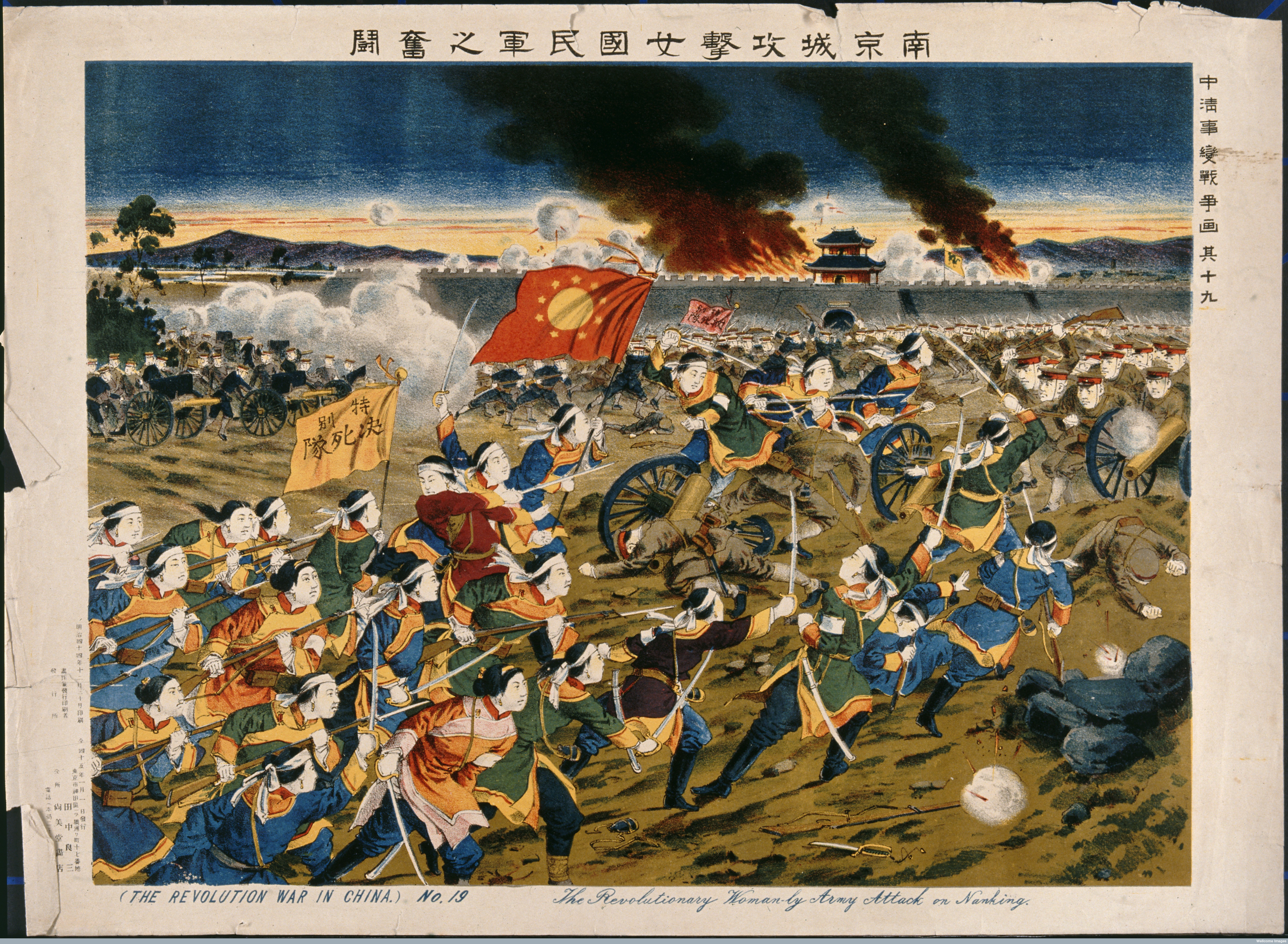
Painting of T. Miyano depicting an attack of female rebel fighters at Nanjing in 1911

Wu personally organized and trained the Women's Revolutionary Army in just ten days, and then led them into combat during the Battle of Hankou. Historian Su Xiao comments that Wu proved to be a capable commander, using her barely trained but highly motivated troops to bypass Qing forces near Hankou and then attack them from behind. She and her unit quickly gained some renown for their good combat performance. The Women's Revolutionary Army then relocated to the east, taking part in the Battle for Nanjing alongside several other female rebel militias. At Nanjing, Wu planned and carried out the attack on the strategically important Shizishen fort.

Following the revolution's end, the Provisional Government of the Republic of China ordered the disbandment of all Chinese women military units on 26 February 1912. It is not known what happened to Wu after her military career.

== Bibliography ==
- Edwards, Louise (2008). Gender, Politics, and Democracy: Women's Suffrage in China. Stanford, California: Stanford University Press.
- Edwards, Louise P. (1994). Men and Women in Qing China: Gender in the Red Chamber Dreams. Leiden, New York City, London: Brill Publishers.
- Fan, Hong (1997). Footbinding, Feminism and Freedom: The Liberation of Women's Bodies in Modern China. London, Portland, Oregon: De Montfort University, Frank Cass.
- Ono, Kazuko (1989). Joshua A. Fogel (ed.). Chinese Women in a Century of Revolution, 1850-1950. Stanford, California: Stanford University Press.
- Strand, David (2011). An Unfinished Republic: Leading by Word and Deed in Modern China. Oakland, Los Angeles, London: University of California Press.
- Su, Xiao (1998). "Women soldiers of the 1911 Revolution". Women of China. Beijing: Foreign Languages Press: 43.
