= Lü Pin (activist) =

Chinese journalist and feminist activist

- Born: 1972 (age 53–54); Shandong, China
- Occupations: Journalist; Feminist activist

Lü Pin (Chinese: 吕频; born 1972) is a Chinese feminist activist and journalist focusing on strategic advocacy to combat gender-based discrimination and violence. She is best known for founding the Feminist Voices (2009–2018), China's largest new media channel on women's issues and for feminist advocacy. She now resides in Albany, New York, where she continues to devote herself to supporting the activism of young feminists across China.

== Early life and education ==
Lü was born in Shandong, China.

In 1994, Lü received her master's degree in Chinese from Shandong University.

In 2017, Lü enrolled in the graduate program in gender studies at University at Albany, SUNY.

In 2020, Lü enrolled in the Ph.D. Program in Women & Politics at Rutgers University.

== Career ==
Lü worked as a journalist at the national newspaper for women China Women's News (zhongguo funübao) after graduating from Shandong University. She took part in the United Nations' 1995 World Conference on Women in Beijing, which gave rise to a strong wave of NGO organizing related to women's issues in China during the 1990s. Lü resigned from her job and became a freelancer in 2004.

In 2009, she founded the electronic newsletter Women's Voice, which was the precursor of the later multi-platform media hosted on both Sina Weibo and Wechat. Feminist Voices, founded in 2009, is the most influential social media for feminist advocation in China. The channel fostered a generation of young Chinese feminists and created a community for activist engagements before it was censored in 2018. Lü also played a vital role in offline feminist activism in China, providing general moral support as well as concrete ideas. She is an important supporter for the "Young Feminist Action", a feminist group based in Chinese cities who participate in public protest.

Lü traveled to the United States to attend the March 2015 United Nations Commission on the Status of Women, but during her stay, Chinese officials detained five of her activists colleagues in China, who were planning a public demonstration on sexual harassment. Lü decided to remain in the United States after learning that the police visited her Beijing apartment.

Her involvement in online feminist activism includes the Facebook group "Free Chinese Feminists", which campaigned for the release of her five colleagues, but has continued as a venue for related news and political organization and a Western window into Chinese feminism activism. Lü is also a member of the Chinese Feminism Collective, an American organization to support feminist activities under suppression in China.

In July 2015, Lü served a visiting scholar appointment at Columbia University.

== Lü Pin's Writings, Talks and Interviews ==
- Lü, Pin. 2021. "Opinion: A pop idol's controversy shows how #MeToo is changing China". The Washington Post.
- "Feminism and Social Change in China: an Interview with Lü Pin (Part 1 of 3)" on early experience, August 26, 2019.
- "Feminism and Social Change in China: an Interview with Lü Pin (Part 2 of 3)" on founding Feminist Voices, September 16, 2019.
- "Feminism and Social Change in China: an Interview With Lü Pin (Part 3 of 3)" on the Feminist Five and #Metoo Movement in China, October 1, 2019.
- "Four Years on: The Whereabouts of the 'Feminist Five' and the Sustainability of Feminist Activism in China." March 11, 2019.
- "Feminist Voices in China: From #MeToo to Censorship". An Interview with Lü Pin and Leta Hong Fincher, July 26, 2018.
- "Gone But Not Forgotten: Why Feminist Voices will never die in China." On Feminist Voices being censored and suspended, April 13, 2018.
- "Two Years on: Is China's Domestic Violence Law Working?" March 7, 2018.
