= Xiaowen Liang =

Chinese feminist activist, organizer, lawyer

- Born: 1992 (age 33–34); China
- Occupations: Lawyer; Activist

Xiaowen Liang (born 1992) is a Chinese feminist activist, organizer, and lawyer. She is part of the #MeToo (Mi Tu) movement in China.

== Early life and education ==
Liang was born in China.

In 2012, Liang received a LL.B. from South China University of Technology in China.

In 2017, Liang received an LL.M in international law from Fordham University School of Law.

== Career ==
While in university in China, Liang co-founded an organization for lesbian feminists, but encountered many obstacles to engagement. She protested differential treatment of women to men in regards to admission polities. She also lobbied for more public restroom facilities for women. In 2012, Liang was an organizer who used performance art as a method of protest. Liang and other activists did a street demonstration where they protested by doing a performance on occupying men's restrooms. As part of these protests, she shaved her head. As a result of her activism, and specifically holding a seminar on women's rights, she was questioned by the police.

In 2016, Liang moved to the United States. She said she felt pressure to stop activism. The police came to her parents' house, as did her parents' employer.

In the United States, Liang continues to advocate for women's rights and fight against sexual harassment and domestic violence – and bring visibility to the women's movement in China.

Liang is part of the #MeToo movement and conducts protests. She founded a grassroots feminist non-governmental organization (NGO) to combat inequality.

Liang is a practicing attorney in New York City.

== Selected works and publications ==
- Flynn, Hailey K.; ElDabh, Christine; Liang, Xiaowen (researched and co-authored by); Petrovic, Jelena (researched and co-authored by); Kashkooli, Fahimeh Mohammadi (researched and co-authored by) (January 2018). Flynn, Hailey K.; Mgbako, Chi Adanna (eds.). "Unjust and Untenable: Why D.C. Must Remove Criminal Penalties for Drug and Paraphernalia Possession". HIPS Report. New York, NY: Helping Individual Prostitutes Survive (HIPS), Leitner Center for International Law and Justice at Fordham Law School.
