= Guo Jing (activist) =

Chinese women's rights activist, feminist activist, social worker and book author

- 郭晶
- Born: 1990 or 1991 (age 35–36); China
- Occupations: Author; Activist
- Years active: 2019-present
- Movement: Chinese feminist movement

Guo Jing (Chinese: 郭晶; born 1990/1991) is a Chinese women's rights activist, feminist activist, social worker, and book author based in Wuhan, Hubei Province, People's Republic of China. She is known for writing Wuhan Lockdown Diary, a diary she wrote during the COVID-19 pandemic in Wuhan, China. Her work has appeared in or has been covered by The New York Times, The New Yorker, The Guardian, and BBC News among others. Her book, Wuhan Lockdown Diary, was published in March 2020 by Taiwan Linking Publishing Company (台湾联经出版社).

Guo is also known for her feminist activism. In 2014, she sued a company in Zhejiang Province for gender discrimination and won. Guo Jing's case is believed to be the first time in China's history that a job seeker won a gender discrimination case against a potential employer.

== Early life ==
Guo was born in Henan province, China. Wuhan is her home town.

== Career ==
In June 2014, Guo applied for a copywriter position at The New Oriental Cooking Vocational Skills Training School. After failing to receive any responses, Guo called the School and asked about the position she applied for. Guo was told by the School that only male candidates would be considered for the position based on the fact that the position required many business trips and carrying heavy suitcases. Guo told the school she was happy to travel and was physically strong enough to carry heavy suitcases. Guo subsequently filed a lawsuit at Xihu District People's Court in Hangzhou city, Zhejiang province on the basis that the school violated Article 3 of the Employment Promotion Law of the People's Republic of China, which requires that "The workers enjoy the right to employment on an equal footing and to choice of jobs on their own initiative in accordance with law. In seeking employment, the workers shall not be subject to discrimination because of their ethnic backgrounds, races, gender, religious beliefs, etc." The school argued that the copywriter position had a special consideration in that it required many business trips with the management of the school, all of whom are male. Therefore, they reasoned, it was out of consideration and care to the plaintiff that they did not recruit her.

In November 2014, Xihu District People's Court in Hangzhou city, Zhejiang province ruled in Guo's favor, finding that the school did not provide any evidence to prove the specialty of the position and the legal reasons for the unsuitability of female worker, and therefore had violated the woman's right to equal employment. The Court ruled that the school should pay Guo 2,000 yuan ($323) in compensation.

In 2017, Guo set up a hotline called "Zero Discrimination" hotline in China for women who are facing gender discrimination in the workplace.

=== Wuhan Lockdown Diary ===
On January 23, 2020, due to the COVID-19 pandemic, Hubei Province announced a complete lockdown across the province. Guo, who is residing in Wuhan, the epicenter of the pandemic, started to keep a diary documenting her story on the first day of the lockdown. Her diary received international acclaim. BBC published her first week diaries on January 30, 2020.

In March 2020, Guo's diary, Wuhan Lockdown Diary, was published.

=== "Anti-Domestic Little Vaccine" campaign ===
In 2020, Guo and fellow activist Zheng Xi launched a campaign called "Anti-Domestic Little Vaccine" to respond to the increase of domestic violence cases during the lockdown. They encouraging people to post anti-domestic violence posters and petitioner letters on their community billboards. Within a week, thousands of people from all across the country participated the campaign.

== Selected works and publications ==
- Guo / 郭晶, Jing (2020). Wuhan Lockdown Diary / 武漢封城日記. Taiwan: Linking Publishing / 聯經文庫. OCLC 1154045284.
