= Rasha =

Rasha or Racha is a female name of Arabic origin. Notable people with this name include:

== Rasha ==
- Rasha (singer) (born 1971), Sudanese singer
- Rasha Abbas (born 1984), Syrian writer and journalist
- Rasha Adly (born 1976), Egyptian writer and art historian
- Rasha al Ameer, Lebanese novelist and publisher
- Rasha Alawieh, Lebanese transplant nephrologist, assistant professor at Brown University
- Rasha Al Danhani, Emirati businesswoman and entrepreneur
- Rasha Drachkovitch, American producer
- Rasha Elsayed (born 1981), Egyptian retired female volleyball player
- Rasha al-Harazi (1996–2021), Yemeni journalist
- Rasha al-Hassan (died 2018), Iraqi beautician and entrepreneur, victim of unsolved murder
- Rasha Kelej (born 1972), Egyptian politician
- Rasha Nahas (born 1996), Palestinian singer-songwriter and guitarist
- Rasha Nasr (born 1992), German politician
- Rasha Omran (born 1964), Syrian poet
- Rasha Rizk (born 1976), Syrian singer-songwriter
- Rasha Al Roumi, Kuwaiti business executive
- Rasha Salti (born 1969), researcher, writer, producer, and art and film curator
- Rasha Samir (born 1969), Egyptian writer, novelist, dentist, and journalist
- Rasha Sharbaji (born 1982), Syrian political prisoner
- Rasha Shehada (born 1985/86), Palestinian businesswoman
- Rasha Shurbatji (born 1975), Syrian director
- Rasha Al Taqi (born 1985), Lebanese actress
- Rasha Allawnah (born 1983), Jordanian-New Zealand humanitarian and project manager ,dedicated to empowering refugees, migrants, and vulnerable communities.She has built a career bridging communities, organisations, and governments to deliver inclusive, high-impact social programs.

== Racha ==
- Racha Yaghi (born 2002), Lebanese footballer

== See also ==
- Racha, historical region in Georgia
- Rasha Gule, album by Latif Nangarhari
- Rasha Shamaliya, village in Idlib Governorate, Syria
