= MeToo movement in China =

Movement against sexual abuse and harassment

The #MeToo movement (Chinese: #WoYeShi) spread to Mainland China shortly after its rise in the United States. Online discussions related to the subject were subjected to censorship, with the tags #Metoo and #MetooinChina being blocked on Weibo, a popular Chinese social media. To avoid the censorship, Chinese women using the #MeToo hashtag on social media began using bunny and bowl-of-rice emojis; "rice bunny" is pronounced mi-tu in Chinese. Feminist activist Xiao Qiqi originated the use of rice-bunny emojis for the movement. Another alternative is "River Crab" which indicates censorship. Generally, the #Metoo movement was only accessible to elite women and urban women.

Due to the lack of sexual education in schools, many women lack the necessary information to address their own sexual assault experiences, their frequency, and their negative effects on their life. When the #MeToo movement surfaced, women had the opportunity to hear and share their own sexual assault experiences, especially through the use of social media. Additionally, social media allows for education and awareness to be built for women and people in general. In Chinese society, Confucian values remain important; these ideological beliefs often create a negative stigma around woman who have experienced sexual assault and those who don't remain chaste. Additionally, there is a cultural emphasis on holding up hierarchies. The #MeToo movement allowed for disclosure and support with less risk in order to promote change and combat structural oppression. The #MeToo movement and similar hashtags have brought women's oppression into the public's eye.

== Universities ==
In universities, young students often do not have the authority to combat assault, so many victims fall silent due to fear of stigmatization and possible impacts on their educational opportunities. Oftentimes, perpetrators in colleges and universities had power over their victims. After the #MeToo movement, some universities started offering support and preventative measures for students. Some included bystander programs which helped educate students on the available resources and ways to prevent sexual assault. However, many of these programs lack the ability to change norms at the universities.

The #MeToo movement began in China in 2017, when Luo Qianqian (罗茜茜) accused Beihang University professor Chen Xiaowu (陈小武) of sexually harassing her in 2004 while she was a PhD candidate. She shared her story on Weibo from the United States and the post went viral on state and social media. On the Chinese question-and-answer site Zhihu, Luo saw other former students discussing Chen's improper behaviour (including sexual assault and forced alcohol consumption); one former student had recorded proof of harassment. Luo then contacted the president of the Beihang Alumni Association to accuse Chen publicly. Xiao Qiqi's hashtag #MeToo on the microblogging platform Weibo attracted more than 2.3 million views, and the university removed Chen from his teaching position. Later, the university removed him from his position as the Vice director and he was removed from the Changjiang scholars. Additionally, the Ministry of Education committed to creating systems to stop sexual assault on campuses. China Daily praised the university's actions, and encouraged students to continue exposing abusive educators. This was the first #MeToo event that gained substantial media attention. Other sexual assault victims began using social media to share their stories. This event also included open letters that students signed which limited censorship. Additionally, other students and professors began to share their support for Lou Quianqian and others who have experienced sexual assault.

As the #MeToo movement attracted public attention, Li Tingting's partner Xiao Meili wrote an open letter denouncing the lack of investigation of sexual harassment on Chinese university campuses. Meili suggested that universities offer education on sexual harassment to students, staff, and faculty with public lectures, hire investigators; and establish hotlines for students to report sexual harassment to school officials.

Peking University graduate Gu Huaying wrote a letter to the university, signed by 9,000 students, asking it to do more to prevent sexual harassment. The campaign faced pressure from school authorities and social-media censorship. Gu Huaying also wanted more information and an investigation into the suicide of a past student, Gao Yan, after she alleged that Professor Zang Peng raped her.

In 2018, the students started a petition to ask him to resign. The petition was stopped by the university administration. One student wrote a letter to the university, so her parents kept her at home to stop her. The student used WeChat to share her want for the Professor to resign.

Professor Zhang Peng was removed from his teaching positions at Shanghai Normal University and Nanjing University when a #MeToo allegation accused him of raping one of his students while teaching at Peking University in 1998. The victim, 20-year-old sophomore Gao Yan, subsequently committed suicide.

Li Qi, a married professor at the Shanghai University of Traditional Chinese Medicine and doctor at the affiliated Shuguang Hospital, was fired by the university in 2022 after its investigation into his affair with a master's-degree student. The student had an abortion after becoming pregnant with his child, and alleged that Li had affairs with other female students by promising to help them publish papers, find jobs, or study overseas.

At the Renmin University of China, students posted their sexual assault stories perpetrated by Professor Gu Haibing, and their posts were removed. Students organized and went to the professor's lecture to carry out "Occupy the Classroom." The students stayed for three hours and protested the professor's actions and lack of accountability.

At Beijing Film University, Weibo removed a post accusing Professor Wu Yi, the Dean of the Faculty of Photography of having sexual relations with students and embezzling money. The university claimed to have contacted the government about the issue. The post relating to the issue was deleted quickly which lead to the creation of the "Water Army" which worked to share the information surrounding Beijing Film University, however, all backlash was removed from the app.

Another group of young people called the "Silence Breakers" wanted to limit censorship. However, similar to the "Water Army" movement, topics related to sexual assault and the #Metoo movement were swiftly removed from social media platforms. In the Chinese, government's civil law framework, a line was added during drafting that made a sexual assault on campus the university's responsibility to prevent.

== Workplace ==
Wang Qi accused her boss of sexually assaulting her in 2017 the company she worked for the "China branch of The World Wildlife Fund." Zhou Fei works at the company and sued for defamation, in 2018, after she publicized that he allegedly assaulted her. The accused suing their alleged victim is relatively frequent, often relating it back to losing a job or defamation. Wang had to apologize for sharing the alleged negative information.

A female Foxconn assembly-line employee posted an article on the women's labour-rights website Jianjiaobuluo alleging that she had experienced daily sexual harassment at the workplace, including obscene jokes about her body and unwanted physical contact. After sexual harassment at Beihang University became known, she demanded that Foxconn educate managers and employees about sexual harassment, establish a hotline for reporting harassment, and display anti-sexual-harassment posters. The Foxconn employee encouraged other female employees, especially migrant workers and undocumented rural workers, to speak up.

In 2017, Chinese journalist Huang Xueqin publicised her experience of workplace sexual harassment. Her story encouraged similar reports, and a number of university academics were disciplined. She surveyed mainland women journalists on the extent of sexual harassment in the industry, and established an online platform for victims to share information with the hashtag #WoYeShi. In August 2019, Huang's passport was confiscated after a six-month trip abroad. She was arrested in Guangzhou in October of that year for "picking quarrels and provoking trouble", a charge often used by police to detain activists. Although Huang had shared photos of Hong Kong protesters, it was unclear if her arrest was related.

In 2017, A woman working for Alibaba shared her workplace sexual assault experience on Weibo. The sexual assault occurred after drinking at a work dinner. The posts began to be spread and the company conducted an internal investigation. A committee was created for harassment complaints, a committee for harassment events, and policies to reduce drinking at work events. The company fired the accused employee and two executives resigned. The Central Inspection and Disciplinary Committee negatively reacted to Alibaba's work misconduct. Other companies have begun to insert protocols and rules surrounding sexual misconduct.

Zhou Xiaoxuan, alternatively Xianzi, was a television intern in 2014 when Zhu Jun, a TV anchor, sexually assaulted her. She went to Weibo to express her assault. Her account was taken down sometime in 2021. Other people's accounts have also been removed when they expressed support of her. In 2018, her case went to court for "personality rights" because you could not sue for sexual harassment in China at the time. Zhou wanted RMB50,000 and a public apology the court denied her and Zhu counter-sued for defamation. She appealed and lost the appeal as well. Now Chinese law specifies that sexual harassment can be prosecuted. After the new law, the court wouldn't retry Zhou's case. The court said there wasn't enough evidence to prove that she was assaulted. She became a central figure in the #Metoo movement. However, it is still very difficult to win cases that involve sexual assault due to the struggle to prove it happened with undeniable evidence.

== Religion ==
Allegations emerged in 2018 of sexual misconduct by Xuecheng, the abbot of Longquan Monastery. Two monks at Beijing Longhua Temple, Shi Xianxia and Shi Xianqi, published a 95-page online report accusing their religious leader of sexual harassment. Xuecheng reportedly sent sexually-harassing text messages to Xianjia, a nun, and five female disciples from Kek Lok Temple in Malaysia. Two rejected his advances, but four disciples finally agreed to Xuecheng's sexual demands. According to the report, the female disciples were sexually harassed to make them dependent on the abbot's religious power. The Haidian district police received alerts of a sexual assault at the temple in June 2018. Xuecheng was also an official of the Chinese Communist Party (CCP), in charge of the government-run Buddhist Association. As a result of the #MeToo movement, he lost his position as abbot and is under investigation for sexual misconduct as a religious and political leader.

== Government ==
For The Spectator, Cindy Yu wrote about the modern phenomenon of CCP officials keeping concubines. Yu noted that after Xi Jinping's 2012 anti-corruption campaign in which all 100,000 officials indicted had had at least one extramarital affair, public discussion of officials' mistresses ended. "Decadence still goes on beneath the surface", however, and Peng Shuai "revealed a rot at the highest level of the party, a dangerous thing to do in Xi's China". Although Chinese authorities have charged officials with sexual misconduct under corruption statutes, this was the first time a member of the top echelon of the CCP has faced public allegations.

On November 2, 2021, professional tennis player Peng Shuai accused former Vice Premier and cadre official Zhang Gaoli of sexual assault. Peng then vanished from public view in what was suspected to be an enforced disappearance, with severe censorship of her story by the Chinese government. In China, her name is no longer searchable. State media appearances were suspected of being staged out of fear of government reprisals. E-mails and publications have said that Peng denies making the accusation of sexual assault. The incident has attracted international concern about Peng's safety, and the WTA suspended all events in China.

== Police intervention and government censorship ==
In 2015, a group of five Chinese feminists (Da Tu, Li Tingting, Wei Tingting, Wu Rongrong, and Wang Man) planned to distribute flyers on International Women's Day to protest sexual harassment on public transportation. On March 7, the day before the planned protest, they were arrested and held in custody for 37 days for "picking quarrels and provoking trouble". The group became known as the Feminist Five. Da Tu said that her feminist organization was reported to the police and forced to close, and feminist performance art and public protest had become almost impossible. She had been fighting sexual harassment in China since 2012, the public space for such activism was drastically reduced in 2014 by Chinese government censorship and police intervention. In prison, Li Tingting's lesbianism was mocked.

In June 2024, Huang Xueqin was reported by a support group to have been sentenced to five years in prison after having been found guilty of "subverting state power." Wang was sentenced to three and a half years. The support group stated that Huang planned to appeal.

== Effects ==
On January 1, 2022, the new Civil Code came into effect. The code has sections addressing sexual assault, specifically adding men as possible victims and making employers potentially responsible for the assault that could occur in the workplace. Now there is a slightly more specific definition of sexual harassment, which makes organizations responsible for creating operations to prevent sexual assault. The civil code's vague language could limit the ability to use its new sexual harassment definition in the future. In Hong Kong, they have more explicit sexual assault laws.

== Bibliography ==
- Fincher, Leta Hong. Betraying Big Brother, The Feminist Awakening in China. London: Verso, 2018.
- Javier C. Hernandez (9 April 2018). "China's #MeToo: How a 20-Year-Old Rape Case Became a Rallying Cry". The New York Times. Archived from the original on 11 April 2018.
- Mimi Lau (7 April 2018). "As #MeToo Movement Gains Traction in China, Professor is sacked 20 Years After Alleged Rape". South China Morning Post.
- Mimi Lau (24 October 2019). "Police detain Chinese #MeToo activist Sophia Huang Xueqin on public order charge". South China Morning Post.
- Shi Xianxia and Shi Xianqi. [A Report on a Significant Situation].
- "Chinese Monk Xuecheng Removed as Head of Beijing's Longquan Monastery Amid Sex Probe". The Straits Times. 30 August 2018.
- Xiao Meili (8 January 2018). "China Must Combat On-Campus Sexual Harassment: An Open Letter". SupChina. Archived from the original on 9 November 2021.
- Xiao Meili (27 March 2018). "Who Are the Young Women Behind the '#MeToo in China' Campaign? An Organizer Explains". China Change.
