= Xiao Meili =

Chinese women's rights activist, feminist, writer

- 肖美丽
- Born: Xiao Yue (肖月); 1989 (age 36–37); Sichuan, China
- Education: Communication University of China
- Occupation: Women's rights activist

Xiao Meili (simplified Chinese: 肖美丽; traditional Chinese: 肖美麗; pinyin: Xiào Měilì; born 1989) is a central Chinese women's rights activist and feminist since the 2010s. She was born in Sichuan, China, but most of her activities take place in Guangzhou and in Beijing, where she lived in 2015. She is mainly known for her campaigns that raise awareness about gender inequality in China and often use dramatic means to draw attention. Notable campaigns include the Bald Sisters, Beautiful Feminist Walk, and Armpit Hair Contest. Her trek across China garnered considerable attention that placed her under an international spotlight. She is closely associated with the Feminist Five, a famous group of five feminists in China, through their similar goals and collaborations.

== Biography ==
Xiao Meili was born in Meishan, Sichuan, in 1989. She studied art and design at the Communication University of China in Beijing and graduated in 2012. In addition to her activism work, Xiao runs an online clothing store on Taobao, one of China's online trading platforms and teaches painting and henna tattoos.

== Activism ==
Xiao Meili began advocating for gender equality in 2012. In an interview with Guangzhou Youth Daily, she dedicated this start to a series of discussions about gender and gender inequality organized by non-governmental charity organizations that she attended in university. She has organized several campaigns to fight against sexual violence, defend women's rights, and advocate for feminist discussions. Apart from campaigns, Xiao Meili set up a feminist group in 2015 in Guangzhou that holds regular discussions and activities about gender inequality and is also part of a Beijing-based feminist group called BCome.

=== Campaigns ===
==== Bloody Wedding Dress ====
Xiao Meili's first campaign was on Valentine's Day in 2012 with two friends to protest against domestic violence. They paraded on a famous pedestrian street in Beijing wearing wedding dresses smeared with fake blood and holding signs such as "love is not an excuse for violence" to denounce violence in intimate relationships. This campaign, also called "The Wounded Bride", led to the creation of the "bloody wedding dress" meme in China that was used to protest against domestic violence online.

==== Bald Sisters ====
On August 30, 2012, Xiao Meili and three friends, including Li Tingting and Liang Xiaowen, shaved their heads in public to protest against the lower college entrance exam scores required for male students compared to female students for admission into certain programs. They expressed their dissatisfaction about the ambiguous guidelines given by the Ministry of Education on the specific universities and programs approved to enforce a higher admission standard for women and their reasons for doing so. This campaign received support from three women who followed in shaving their heads, the Feminist Voices on the Chinese social media platform Sina Weibo, and various organizations who sent further applications to the Ministry of Education asking for the disclosure of this information and organized other activities raising awareness about the gender discrimination in university admission standards. In October 2012, the Ministry of Education issued a response disclosing the specific programs that can restrict admission based on gender are limited to three categories: specific professions (national defence, military, and public security), arduous majors (including mining and maritime), and gender-balanced programs (including broadcasting and non-universal languages). In May 2013, the Ministry of Education set new regulations that prohibit university programs, excluding the three specific professions, from increasing the admission standard for women and refusing admission based on gender.

==== The Vagina Monologues ====
Xiao Meili, as a member of a feminist group in Beijing called BCome, was a screenwriter and lead actress in the Chinese adaptation of The Vagina Monologues. BCome modified the play to highlight common experiences of Chinese women regarding gender, sex, and sexuality for the purpose of public education through interactions with the audience and uncensored stories about topics such as virginity and rape. Starting from January 2013, they have held more than ten performances of The Vagina Monologues in L.G.B.T. centers, cafes, art centers, and other unofficial theatres.

==== Beautiful Feminist Walk ====
In response to a number of sexual assault and physical abuse cases involving primary school children in 2013, Xiao Meili set out on a 2,000 km walk through five provinces from Beijing, China to Guangzhou, China to raise awareness for sexual assault and to change victim-blaming tendencies. The walk, which lasted from September 2013 to March 2014, acted as a way to reclaim the public roads as a place safe for women and to contest the notion that women should stay indoors to avoid sexual abuse. At each city she passed, she gathered signatures and sent letters to local officials to advocate for better safety and sex education, more support for sexual assault victims, vetting processes for teachers, and improved measures in preventing sexual assault, especially concerning children. For the 165 letters Xiao Meili sent, she received more than 2,000 signatures and replies from a few local governments promising action. She received several requests for interviews and public talks to share her messages and also support from local residents, who joined for portions of the walk, offered accommodation, and donated money.

==== Armpit Hair Contest ====
In May 2015, Xiao Meili started a two-week-long contest on Sina Weibo that encouraged women to share pictures of their armpits. Her goal of the photo contest was to spark debate about gender inequality and challenge beauty standards. Xiao Meili launched this following the Chinese government's brief arrest of five women's rights activists just days before International Women's Day. This group of women—Li Tingting (李婷婷), Wei Tingting (韦婷婷), Zheng Churan (郑楚然), Wu Rongrong (武嵘嵘), and Wang Man (王曼)—are commonly known as the "Feminist Five." The contest garnered more than 1.2 million views, 1,150 comments, and around 40 submissions, including photos from Wei Tingting, Li Tingting, and Zheng Churan. In compliance with the message of the campaign, the winners were given prizes of condoms, vibrators, or female urination devices for use while standing. Xiao Meili's activism campaigns are funded from online personal donations, specifically from her Beautiful Feminist Walk for the prizes in this case.

==== "A Little Pastoral" ====
In June 2019, Xiao Meili worked with Zhang Leilei and Tian Zuoyi to create the podcast "A Little Pastoral" (有点田园). They co-host the podcasts to speak on issues about gender and feminism mainly focusing on personal stories and cases in the news. The podcast reached 25,000 listeners at the beginning of 2020.

=== Against sexual harassment ===
In early 2018, Xiao Meili participated in activism to combat sexual harassment faced by women using public transportation. She cited Simone de Beauvoir's The Second Sex as a strong influence in shaping her activist work.
