= The Feminist Five =

Chinese women's rights activists

The Feminist Five is a group of five Chinese feminists who were arrested in Beijing on March 6, 2015, for planning a protest against sexual harassment on public transportation. The quintet is composed of Li Maizi (birth name Li Tingting), Wu Rongrong, Zheng Churan, Wei Tingting and Wang Man.

The five women were detained for 37 days after planning to hand out sexual harassment stickers on the subway ahead of International Women's Day (March 8) and became known following their arrest. Their arrest sparked outrage both internationally and domestically, leading to protests in support of the five women in the United States, the United Kingdom, South Korea, Hong Kong, India, Poland and Australia. There were likely protests within China, but those were subject to censorship and crackdowns. The Feminist Five were released on bail on April 13, 2015, due to the backlash following their detention.

The incident became part of Chinese feminist history and the Feminist Five are still criminalized and under state surveillance after their release. While their detention sparked outrage and encouraged young women to speak up and also take part in feminist activism, it was hard to engage in feminist activism without funding. Their actions are still recognized, particularly during the MeToo movement in China.

== The Five ==
The five women had met through women's rights groups and protests such as the Gender Equality Work Group, run by Wu Rongrong.

=== Li Maizi ===
Li Tingting (Chinese: 李婷婷), also known as Li Maizi (Chinese: 李麦子) is a women's rights and LGBT activist who became a prominent feminist figure in China along with the other Feminist Five following the group's arrest.

In 2012, Li Maizi initiated the "Occupy Men's Toilets" protest organized by the Gender Equality Work Group, where she met Zheng Churan. The group protested the lack of public toilets for women by occupying men's public toilets in Guangzhou. The protest was then reported by various Chinese news outlets such as the People's Daily and led Guangdong officials to respond by promising to add more public toilets for women.

That same year, Li took part in the "Bloody Brides" parade for Valentine's Day to protest domestic violence alongside Wei Tingting and Xiao Meili. The women wore wedding gowns splattered with fake blood.

In 2013, Li Maizi attended a party at the Feminist Voices' Beijing office in a white wedding dress covered with fake blood to celebrate American citizen Kim Lee's divorce grant due to domestic violence from her husband Li Yang, a famous Chinese teacher, and the first Beijing court-issued restraining order. Li held a sign that read "Shame on You, Perpetrator Li Yang!" and this event later allowed the enactment of a new anti-domestic violence law in China, in 2016.

=== Wu Rongrong ===
Wu Rongrong (Chinese: 武嵘嵘) is a feminist activist who worked on women's rights at Yirenping, a Beijing human rights group, before founding the Weizhiming Women's Center in Hangzhou.

Wu moved to Beijing to study at China Women's University where she volunteered for anti-poverty, HIV/AIDS, and women's rights non-governmental organizations (NGOs). Wu graduated in 2007.

In 2009, she organized a campaign at Yirenping in support of Deng Yujiao, a young woman who had killed a government official in self-defence as he was sexually assaulting her. The campaign involved performance art protesting where a woman bound with white sheet was laid on the ground, with sheets of papers spelling "We Could All Be Deng Yujiao" placed above her.

In 2012, Wu organized the "Bloody Brides" parade in which Li Maizi, Wei Tingting and Xiao Meili took part.

=== Zheng Churan ===
Zheng Churan (Chinese: 郑楚然), also known as Big Rabbit, is a feminist activist and writer. Zheng was invited by Wu Rongrong to participate in the "Occupy Men's Toilets" protest alongside Li Maizi, in 2012. She also worked on the "Bloody Brides" campaign where Li Maizi, Wei Tinting and Xiao Meili in blood-stained wedding gowns.

In 2016, Zheng wrote a letter to then-President-elect Donald Trump to address his "sexist behaviour" and listed different types of sexist behaviours through a poll she made online that gathered more than 10,000 responses.

Zheng was chosen as one of BBC's 100 Women in 2016 for her activism.

=== Wei Tingting ===
Wei Tingting (Chinese: 韦婷婷) is an LGBT and women's rights activist. Wei joined the LGBT organization Wuhan Rainbow after organizing The Vagina Monologues in Wuhan in 2007 and 2009.

Wei also worked as the director of an LGBT organization, Ji'ande.

In 2012, Wei participated in the "Bloody Brides" campaign against domestic violence organized by Wu Rongrong, where she paraded with Li Maizi and Xiao Meili.

=== Wang Man ===
Wang Man (Chinese: 王曼) is a gender researcher based in Shanghai.

In 2010, Wang started working for an anti-poverty NGO in Beijing where she met feminist activists she could relate to, which led her to becoming involved in feminist campaigns such as the "Occupy Men's Toilets" campaign. Wang also wrote articles about street feminist activism in China.

== Arrest and detention ==
The Feminist Five were arrested on March 6, 2015, in different cities and officially detained on International Women's Day in Beijing Haidian District detention center on the grounds of "picking quarrels and provoking trouble". The women were apprehended following their planned campaign against sexual harassment on public transportation, where they were to distribute anti-sexual harassment stickers on the subway for International Women's Day.

According to Li Maizi, Li was placed in cell 1105, Zheng Churan in cell 1107, Wei Tingting cell 1103 and Wang Man in cell 1101. Wu Rongrong on the other hand was placed in cell 1203, further away from the other cells.

Li Maizi was arrested at her home, where she lived with her partner Teresa Xu. At first, Li did not speak during interrogations. She was cursed at by the agents interrogating her for her sexuality (Li identifies as a lesbian), and called an "unfilial daughter". In an attempt to make her talk, the agents forced Li's father write a letter reprimanding her and ordering her to cease her work as a feminist activist, but Li identified the letter as having been coerced. Li was also accused of being a spy for "subverting state power".

Wu Rongrong was arrested upon her arrival in Hangzhou. During her interrogation, Wu attempted to make the agents release the other women by explaining that she was the founder Weizhiming Women's Center and that the other women were only volunteers. Wu was then taken to the center where the agents searched for and confiscated her electronic devices. Her home was also searched and her husband interrogated. Wu was finally taken to the Beijing Haidian District detention center where Li Maizi, Wei Tingting and Zheng Churan were being held. Wu Rongrong suffered from hepatitis B and was still recovering from two weeks of hospitalization when she was arrested. During her incarceration, her requests for medical treatment were ignored and she was not allowed to rest.

Zheng Churan, who was living with her parents at the time, was arrested at her home after the authorities went looking for her under the pretense of needing to check her housing registration. Zheng claims they did not have a search warrant or any identification and only one of the men wore a police uniform, but willingly left with them so they would not enter the house. Zheng had her glasses confiscated when she was detained. Zheng was threatened by agents who told her her parents would suffer for the rest of their lives due to her actions. As a result of the stress received during interrogations, Zheng suffered from lack of sleep and hair fall outs. Zheng's health continued to deteriorate as she developed anxiety and her eyesight became poorer due to her glasses being confiscated. She also felt guilty about the other women's incarceration because she was the one who had thought of distributing stickers against sexual harassment.

Wei Tingting, like Zheng, also had her glasses confiscated when she was arrested and could no longer see. Wei was asked about her activism and was denied a lawyer when she asked to call for one during her interrogation. Wei posted an essay on WeChat called "Prison Notes" where she documented her life in detention. Wei suffered from anxiety during her incarceration and also had to face the same challenges regarding her eyesight as Zheng who had gotten her glasses confiscated as well.

Wang Man was arrested and taken underground in the Beijing Haidian detention center, where the other Feminist Five were being held. Wang Man, like Wei and Zheng, also had her glasses confiscated and could not properly see her surroundings. Wang was placed in isolation after her interrogation. One of Wang's greatest concerns during her detention was that she had a heart condition and was uncertain of when she would be able to return home.

During their incarceration, the five women found comfort in hearing each other's voices and knowing they were not alone. Wei Tingting would sing songs such as "Mo Li Hua", joined by Li Maizi who would sing "A Song for All Women" in order to make the other women feel at ease.

== International attention and release ==
The Feminist Five's arrest happened ahead of Chinese Communist Party general secretary Xi Jinping's cohosting of the United Nations summit on women's rights in New York as part of the celebration of the twentieth anniversary of Beijing's World Conference on Women, prompting world leaders and human rights organizations across the world to speak up.

Following the news of their arrest, the hashtag #FreeBeijing20Five (#FreeTheFive was then used instead) started being used on Twitter in April to call for the women's release. The hashtag referenced #Freethe20, a campaign dedicated to helping free women political prisoners around the world. Hillary Clinton, who was then running for president of the United States, wrote on Twitter on April 6, 2015: "The detention of women's activists in #China must end. This is inexcusable. #FreeBeijing20Five". Similarly, Joe Biden, then vice president of the US, tweeted on April 10, 2015: "Rights of women and girls should never be suppressed. We urge Chinese leaders to show respect for women's rights and #FreeBeijing20Five". Samantha Power, who was then the US ambassador to the UN, tweeted: "In China speaking out against sexual harassment is 'creating a disturbance.' Disturbance is restricting NGOs fighting for universal rights." Several petitions were made calling for the women's release both globally and within China, including a petition from All Out, an LGBT rights NGO, which amassed over 85,000 signatures.

In China, specifically Guangzhou and Beijing, women took the streets wearing masks of the Feminist Five's faces as a show of support. Petitions circulated within universities, and students who signed those petitions were warned and threatened by university officials with poor marks that would put their futures at risk, and even pressured by state agents. Additionally, the lack of medical treatment for Wu Rongrong, who was suffering from hepatitis B, prompted supporters to voice their concerns at the detention center where the women were held. Social media crackdowns were also implemented, as activists found ways to communicate through WeChat. The supporters were however briefly detained. In a similar show of support, people all around the world posted pictures online of themselves wearing masks of the five women's faces.

In addition to these pleas from the global and Chinese public as well as world leaders and organizations to release the Feminist Five, human rights lawyers in China made a statement asking for the women's release on March 9, 2015, and female lawyers reached out to the Department of Public Security and the All-China Women's Federation to lodge their complaints. The Public Interest Collaborative Network for Women Lawyers, a group of feminist lawyers, also signed a petition demanding the women's release. This resulted in a crackdown where hundreds of the human rights lawyers involved, such as Wang Yu who was Li Maizi's lawyer, were detained months later.

Following great pressure on the government calling for their release, the women were released on bail on April 13, 2015, after being detained for 37 days.

== Aftermath ==
As a result of their incarceration, all five of the women were left to deal with psychological issues. In the case of Wang Man and Wu Rongrong, medical neglect was also a concern.

Despite their release, the Feminist Five are still criminalized and subject to state surveillance. In December 2016, Wu Rongrong explained to writer Leta Hong Fincher that she had gotten used to being under state surveillance. Zheng Churan also talks about being monitored by Guangzhou agents, although they were not the same ones that had interrogated her during the Feminist Five's detention in 2015.

After the arrest of the Feminist Five, feminist activism was made harder to practice in China. In 2017, the "Overseas NGO Management Law" made it illegal to accept funds from foundations that do not have offices in China. Moreover, NGOs that do not have specific qualifications are unable to cooperate with international foundations and these new limitations made joining feminist movements harder.

These restrictions also affected the Feminist Five. After the women's release, lack of funding and pressure from authorities forced Wu Rongrong's Weizhiming to shut down.

Regardless of these efforts to discourage people from taking part in feminist activism, the story of the Feminist Five became known around the world, and inspired young women in China to get involved as well. According to Wu's deputy, Gina, "The detention of the Feminist Five was awful, but on the other hand, so many more people started paying attention to our cause and volunteering". Moreover, more women (including high schoolers) came to use the word "feminist" to identify themselves.

Although movements such as #MeToo that spread throughout several countries across the world could not be completely stifled, censorship and crackdowns did not allow for the movement to take off completely in China. In 2017, three women planning to hand out anti-sexual harassment stickers as the Feminist Five had done, were expelled from their homes in Guangzhou. Posts written against sexual harassment and sexual assault on WeChat and Weibo were taken down. In 2018, the popular account Feminist Voices was permanently banned on Weibo for posting "sensitive and illegal information". The account had 180,000 followers on the platform.

Engaging in feminist activism in China remains difficult due to censorship and various restrictions put in place to keep people from doing so, but the actions of the Feminist Five have nonetheless inspired more young women to take action.
