= Chen Mingxia (academic) =

Chinese feminist and professor

Chen Mingxia, born in 1948, is a Chinese feminist and professor of law who has promoted women's legal rights. She helped initiate an anti-domestic violence project that developed into the first large scale women's NGO in China, Stop Domestic Violence. As a scholar and activist, Chen emphasizes that domestic violence against women is not only a private matter but a collective public issue and infringement upon women's human rights in China, requiring both legal and social action.

== Work as a legal scholar ==
A researcher at the Institute of Research at the China Academy of Social Science, Chen Mingxia is also a Professor of Law at the Chinese Academy of Social Sciences. In 1998, Chen Mingxia established the Domestic Violence Network and served as the chair of its executive council.

In that capacity she implemented gender training programs to bring awareness to domestic violence in China. She utilized her legal background to promote the installation of the Center for Research on Gender and Law at the China Academy of Social Sciences in 2002. She utilized her legal background and education to promote the doctrine of these trainings, and educative research opportunities within the realm of equality. Her main objective in creating the network and social sciences center was to promote the safety of women across all grounds, through providing educative tools and information regarding the background on domestic issues.

In order to promote the protection of women globally, Mingxia extended her activism through venturing to India, where she provided educative trainings on the founded network of domestic violence. As a women's rights activist and legal scholar, Chen also advocated for the protective rights of women's inclusion within education, but ultimately focused her efforts towards bringing awareness to domestic violence in China, and enshrining gender equality in the law.

== Work for gender equality ==
Chen worked closely with the All-China Women's Federation in the 1990s, a government-affiliated women's organization advocating the rights and interests of women from diverse backgrounds across China. In collaboration with the organization's local branch in Qianxi County, Hebei Province, Chen spearheaded the implementation of informational programs on the Law on the Protection of the Rights and Interests of Women, a 1992 law that promotes and protects women's rights in the home, workplace, and educational institutions. Chen and her cohort of activists were able to print and distribute 10,000 pamphlets on the law and its application, and they reached an audience of over 60,000 in their theatrical performances. Their campaign included training courses, theatrical performances based on real cases of gender-based violence and inequality, and the distribution of educational materials for both government officials and village residents, with an emphasis on reaching the illiterate and those lacking higher education in the region.

== Work in the anti-domestic violence movement in China ==
Chen's background as a legal scholar of the Institute of Research at the China Academy of Social Science and her contributions to many anti-domestic violence and women's rights initiatives, led to her being appointed as chairperson of the Network/Research Center for Combating Domestic Violence (DVN)'s executive committee. The DVN, the first women's NGO established exclusively for fighting domestic violence in China, was founded in 1998 in Beijing, and aimed to address domestic violence issues through legal advocacy and change. A coalition alliance of four women's NGO's (the Women's Law Center, the Maple Women's Psychological Counseling Center, the Women's Media Watch Network, and the China Women's College) along with individual activists and scholars– formed the DVN. Chen contributed her legal expertise and experience with NGOs to the DVN. Chen helped initiate "gender training" projects, which included educating community leaders on how to manage incidences of domestic violence, discussing domestic violence perpetrators and victims with different groups, and educating institutions and universities on feminist legal theory.

In the late 1990s, Chen leveraged her influence as Chairperson of DVN and by becoming part of the expert committee of women's protection legislation on the country's drafting of amendments to the Marriage Law and Law on the Protection of Women's Rights and Interests. The amendments aimed to designate "domestic violence" as an independent category of crime recognized by the China's justice system, as many forms of gender violence were not recognized publicly by China's laws. On the committee for Marriage Law, Chen was the main advocate in incorporating the term "domestic violence" into the text, while in the Women's Rights and Interests Law Chen drafted the "rights to the body" section. This section defined women's bodily rights and importantly included the issue of sexual harassment. Chen and other activists' persistence to pass these amendments despite strong opposition from the government resulted in the historical breakthrough within China's legislation in 2001, when these amendments became the first (and they remain the only) national laws explicitly prohibiting domestic violence. Though these laws represented breakthroughs, some feminists criticize the vagueness of the wording in both laws and their inability to give tangible aid and protection in actual cases of domestic violence.

== Selected publications ==
Chen has written and co-authored five books on law since the 1990s, covering topics on labor, marriage, family law, and domestic violence. She has authored informational books on general legal concepts and practices, as well as detailing her activism and domestic violence advocacy through contributions to feminist publications. In her 1999 article in the journal Violence Against Women Volume 5, Chen stresses the importance of state intervention in mediating domestic violence on the basis that it is an infringement on women's bodily rights and harmed the integrity of social order. Specifically, she argues for more explicit statements of domestic violence in policy, better education measures for legal personnel, and support of mediation in domestic violence as not a private phenomena but a public responsibility. She has also contributed to larger publications such as the book Holding Up Half the Sky: Chinese Women Past, Present and Future, a collection of 21 essays from Chinese women scholars, where she urges a comprehensive social law to support individual rights within the traditional family construct to combat prevalent domestic violence. The central argument of her activism is that it is the state's duty, in line with the Constitution and legal provisions, to address domestic violence.

== Sources ==
- Zhang, Lu (2008). Transnational Feminisms in Translation: The Making of a Women's Anti-Domestic Violence Movement in China (Thesis). OCLC 611595248. ProQuest 304505447.
