= Wei Tingting =

Chinese LGBT rights activist

- 韦婷婷
- Born: 1989 (age 36–37); Hechi, Guangxi, China
- Occupation: Human rights activist
- Years active: 2007–present
- Known for: Feminist Five

Wei Tingting (Chinese: 韦婷婷; born 1989) is a Chinese LGBTI+ and feminist activist, writer and documentary filmmaker. She is one of the Feminist Five.

== Early life and career ==
Wei was born in Hechi in the southern region of Guangxi in China.

She received a Bachelor of Laws in sociology in 2009 and a Master of Laws in anthropology in 2011, both from Wuhan University.

== Career ==
While in college, Wei became active in the women's and LGBT rights movements. In 2007 and 2009, Wei assisted in coordinating and staging productions of The Vagina Monologues. She joined the Wuhan Rainbow, an LGBT organization.

Wei also served as director of Ji'ande, an LGBTQ rights organization in Beijing.

Wei co-founded the National Bisexual Network in China.

From 2011 to 2016, Wei worked as a project manager at the Beijing Gender Health Education Institute, a national agency centered around sexuality and sexual health, raising awareness about gender inequities and sexual diversity. Part of her work included helping to organize an annual AIDS Walk on the Great Wall, the China AIDS Walk, the first large-scale HIV/AIDS public fundraising project in mainland China, coordinating the Mainstream Media Awards for good LGBT community reporting, and coordinating the organization's Rights and Advocacy program & annual National LGBT conference in China. Wei co-hosted China's first non-profit LGBT webcast called "Queer Comrades", was a member of the China, Taiwan, and Hong Kong-based network Queer Lala Times, and attended women's conferences in India and South Korea.

In 2012, Wei Tingting and Li Tingting participated in a Valentine's Day protest against domestic violence in Beijing.

From 2012 to 2014, Wei was a project manager at Chinese Lala Alliance.

From 2013 to 2014, Wei was a contributor to Les+ Magazine and coordinated a project called "View Beijing+20 from Lesbian perspective".

From 2015 to 2017, Wei was a coordinator at LGBT Rights Advocacy China, where she worked with victims of LGBT conversion therapies to help them bring legal cases, and also support lawsuits against homophobic teaching materials.

From 2016 to 2019, Wei was the founder and director of the Guangzhou Gender and Sexuality Education Center (GGSEC), a non-governmental organization in Guangzhou, China. The organization conducts gender and sexuality education, training and advocacy activities.

Wei collected material for the first Chinese documentary film about bisexuality in China, which was called Bi China and was released in 2017.

In 2018, Wei founded the Guangzhou Nalisha Education Consulting Co., Ltd., a company that conducts gender and sexuality research, education, training and advocacy activities, offering mental health support and consulting support for victims in gender and sexuality field to against discrimination to women and LGBTI community.

== Feminist Five ==
In 2015, she and four other activists (Zheng Churan, Wang Man, Wu Rongrong, and Li Tingting, collectively known as the "Feminist Five") were detained by the Chinese government just prior to International Women's Day, the day they planned to execute a campaign against sexual harassment on public transportation. All five women were released on bail after 37 days of detention. Had they been convicted, the women could have faced up to three years in prison for "creating a disturbance". Since being released, Wei has said she will continue to fight for gender equality. She said:

I have read so many reports and articles about our arrest and they are so touching and encouraging. I had started to feel despondent and thought this incident would be the end for us young, female activists. But the reaction has started an era of magnificent, new activists. They cannot catch all of us and block us all.

== Personal life ==
Wei is bisexual.

== Honors ==
- 2015: Bustle, 14 Women's Rights Activists Around the World Who Will Inspire You
- 2015: Ms. Magazine, 10 of the Most Inspiring Feminists of 2015
- 2015: Asia LGBT Milestone Awards (ALMAs), Hero of the Year, nominee
- 2018: Troy Perry Medal of Pride

== Selected works and publications ==
- Wei, Tingting (2011). "How to Use Applied Theater in Sexuality Education in China". Population and Development (Core Journal in China) (in Chinese). 1.
- Wei, Tingting (2012). "From Vagina Monologue to Leifeng Pagoda: Rethinking and Producing Women's Body". The International Conference on Chinese Women and Visual Representation.
- Wei, Tingting (2012). "The Body Goes Beyond Boundary - Research of Lesbian and Gay in Cities". Sexualities and Gender Study. 5: 354–387.
- Wei, Tingting (2014). "A Look at the Beijing Conference through Lesbian Eyes". China Development Brief (in Chinese). 3.
- Wei, Tingting (6 October 2015). "A Look at the Beijing Conference through Lesbian Eyes". Asian Journal of Women's Studies. 21 (3): 316–325. doi:10.1080/12259276.2015.1072944. S2CID 155370554.
- Wei, Tingting (2016). "Review and Report of the Beijing Conference 1996 through Lesbian Eyes". Sexuality Research in China (in Chinese). 2 (Total No. 37): 131–144.
- Wei, Tingting (2017). "A report on sexual harassment on Chinese College Campuses, 2016-2017". Sexuality Research in China (in Chinese).

== Filmography ==
- 2015: We Are Here – producer
- 2017: Bi China – director

== See also ==
- LGBT rights in China
- List of feminists
- List of LGBT rights activists
- List of women's rights activists
