= Zheng Churan =

Chinese women's rights activist

- Born: 1988 or 1989 (age 36–37); Guangzhou, China
- Occupations: Writer, activist
- Known for: Feminist activism

Zheng Churan (Chinese: 鄭楚然; pinyin: Zhèng Chǔrán) is a Chinese women's rights activist and feminist. Together with four other activists, she was detained, in March 2015, shortly before events planned for International Women's Day. They are collectively known as the Feminist Five. In November 2016, she became one of the BBC's 100 Women 2016.

== Protest ==
In 2015, she and four other activists (Wei Tingting, Wang Man, Wu Rongrong, and Li Tingting, collectively known as the "Feminist Five") were detained by the Chinese government just prior to International Women's Day, the day they planned to execute a campaign against sexual harassment on public transportation. All five women were released on bail after 37 days of detention. Had they been convicted, the women could have faced up to three years in prison for "creating a disturbance".

In November 2016, the BBC highlighted Zheng's contributions to organizing events, her support for women's rights, and her fight for women to be given menstrual leave.

In December 2016, Zheng wrote an open letter to Donald Trump warning him to avoid sexist behaviour in the future.

She and Xiao Meili operate an online store selling original designs about feminism on Taobao called Dúpǐn Shāngdiàn (独品商店).

In 2018, she was the plaintiff in a defamation case against Kù Wán Shíyànshì (酷玩实验室), a Chinese independent media platform. They had previously accused Zheng Churan of running an international sex trafficking operation. The case remains ongoing.

Zheng Churan is an outspoken activist and prolific writer on feminist and human rights issues.

== Arrest of Wei Zhili ==
On March 20, 2019, at around 2 a.m., Zheng's husband Wei Zhili was taken away by the police. As a journalist and a labor activist, Wei was accused by the police of "disturbing public order" and needing "education" after being "brainwashed". He worked with Chinese laborers to obtain government compensation after they had been stricken with pneumoconiosis from unsafe working conditions. For days after Wei's arrest, his wife and parents were not informed of his whereabouts.

After her husband's incarceration, Zheng began an online campaign to bring attention and raise awareness to Wei's case. She plans to run 10,000 kilometers and post a daily update of her progress on Twitter.
