= Blen Mesfin =

Ethiopian political prisoner

Blen Mesfin (Amharic: ብሌን መስፍን) is an official in Ethiopia’s opposition Semayawi (Blue) Party. In 2016, she was named one of twenty women political prisoners in the FreeThe20 campaign by Samantha Power, the U.S. Ambassador to the United Nations.

Mesfin was arrested at a protest in Addis Ababa in April 2015. The protest was for 26 Ethiopians killed by a group called Islamic State in Libya. More than 30 members of the Semayawi Party were arrested before an April 27 political rally.

Two other members of the Semayawi Party, Meron Alemayehu (ሜሮን አለማየሁ ) and Nigist Wondifraw (ንግስት ወንዲፍራው), were also arrested. They were #5 and #6 in the FreeThe20 campaign. They are now free.
