= Jiaocheng =

Jiaocheng may refer to the following locations in China:

- Jiaocheng County (交城县), Lüliang, Shanxi
- Jiaocheng District (蕉城区), Ningde, Fujian
- Jiaocheng, Jiaoling County (蕉城镇), town in Guangdong
