= Hisham al-Khashin =

Egyptian author and novelist

Hashim al-Khashin
- Born: 14 July 1963 (age 63); Egypt
- Education: Bachelor in Civil Engineering Master in Business
- Years active: 2010–present
- Notable work: Graphite

Hisham al-Khashin (Arabic: هشام الخشن) born on 14 July 1963, is an Egyptian author and novelist. He has published two short story collections and seven novels so far. In 2014, his novel "Graphite" was nominated in the long list for the International Prize for Arabic Fiction. His novel "7 Days of Tahrir" has also been converted into a TV series entitled "Wa Yaati Al nahaar" which was produced by the Cairo voice company.

== Biography ==
Hisham Al khashin is an Egyptian author and novelist born on 14 July 1963 in Egypt. He obtained a bachelor's degree in Civil Engineering from Cairo University in 1986. He then obtained a master's degree in business from the American University in 1992. In 2009, Al kashin published his first short stories collection entitled "Very Egyptian Stories "which some newspapers and daily periodicals published from within the group.

Two years later, he published his first novel, What is Behind the Doors, which is now adapted into a TV series. After that he published his second novel "7 Days of Tahrir" that considered the first literary work narrating the events of January 25 revolution in Egypt. In the same context. Cairo voice company has converted his novel "Wa Yati Alnahaar" into a TV series. His third novel, Adam al-Masri, has been published in 2012 which take place entirely in London. In 2013, Al khashin published a collection of stories with the author Rasha Samir entitled "Duet". A year later, he published his forth novel "Graphite" which spotted the light on the social situation in Egypt, feminism and the Muslim Brotherhood in 1928, The novel was also among the long list of the International Prize for Arabic Fiction in 2014, which was able to be among 16 works of fictional works.

In 2016, he published his fifth novel entitled " Tilaal Lacasia" followed by the novel "Happened in Berlin " which was one of the most-selling books in Egypt in 2018. It was also chosen as a scheduled reading within the Arabic language curriculum at the German School in Cairo. His novel "Shillat Libon" was published in July 2020 and topped the best-selling lists in Egypt for several months consecutively, and it has been signed to be converted into a movie.

== Works ==
=== Short stories collections ===
- Hikayaat Masriya jiddan. Al dar Almasria Al lebnania, 2009
- Duet, Al dar Al lebnania Al masria 2009 (Shared book with author Rasha Samir)

=== Novels ===
- What is Behind the Doors (Ma Wara Al abwab, Al dar Almasria Al lebnania, 2010)
- 7 Days of Tahrir (7 Ayaam fi Al tahrir, Al dar Almasria Al lebnania, 2011)
- Adam Al Masri, Aldar Almasria Al lebnania, 2013
- Graphite, Aldar Al arabia lilkitab's library, 2014
- Tilal Lacasia, Aldar Al arabia lilkitab library, 2016
- Happened in Berlin (Hadath fi Berlin, Aldar Al arabia lilkitab library, 2018)
- Shelat Libon, Aldar Almasria Al lebnania, 2020
