= Matlyuba Kamilova =

Uzbek political prisoner

Matlyuba Kamilova, also Matluba, (born 1960) is an Uzbek human rights activist and school principal. In 2016, Samantha Power, the U.S. Ambassador to the U.N., named her one of twenty women political prisoners in the FreeThe20 campaign.

Kamilova spoke out about police corruption. In September 2010, she was arrested and charged with possession of drugs. She is still in prison.

== Life and work ==
Born in 1960, Kamillova is a lawyer. She was the director of a technical college in Angren, Tashkent.

She worked against corruption and helped people work for their rights. Thanks to her involvement, two corruption cases were started against local government officials.

On September 6, 2010, police stopped Kamilova in her car, in which her 21-year-old son, Shohruhon, was also present. The police told Shohruhon they found heroin in the car. They beat Kamilova and her son, and took them to jail. In jail, they made Kavilova listen to the screams of prisoners being beaten because they wanted her to confess. At the trial, the police did not agree about where they found the drugs. An activist at the trial said the police put drugs on Kamilova. Drug convictions and planting drugs on human rights activists are routine in Uzbekistan.

A court sentenced Kamilova to eleven years in prison. Because it is a drug charge, she cannot appeal. No one knows where she is.
