= Bùi Thị Minh Hằng =

Vietnamese political prisoner

Bùi Thị Minh Hằng is a Vietnamese activist and blogger. In 2016, Samantha Power, the U.S. Ambassador to the U.N., named her as one of twenty women political prisoners in the FreeThe20 campaign.

== Career and Arrests ==
In 2011, Hằng protested in Hanoi and in Ho Chi Minh City against Chinese territorial claims on the Spratly and Paracel Islands. She was then arrested by police before been sent to Thanh Ha Education Center, a re-education camp in Vĩnh Phúc Province. Her arrestment was met with international protest. She was in the re-education camp for six months without a trial.

In 2012, Hằng was freed and returned to her work on human rights, writing about her time in the Thanh Ha Education Center. She also published a “Manual for the Implementation of Human Rights” (Cam nang thuc thi quyen lam nguoi). In 2014, Hằng with a group of 21 bloggers and Hoa Hao Buddhist activists went to visit a political prisoner. She was arrested again for the second time along with two other activists. She was charged with disrupting traffic under Article 245 of the Penal Code, and sentenced to three years in prison.

In 2016, Amnesty International reported Hằng had health problems in prison and she did not receive any medical care from the Vietnamese authorities.
