= FreeThe20 campaign =

Campaign to free women political prisoners

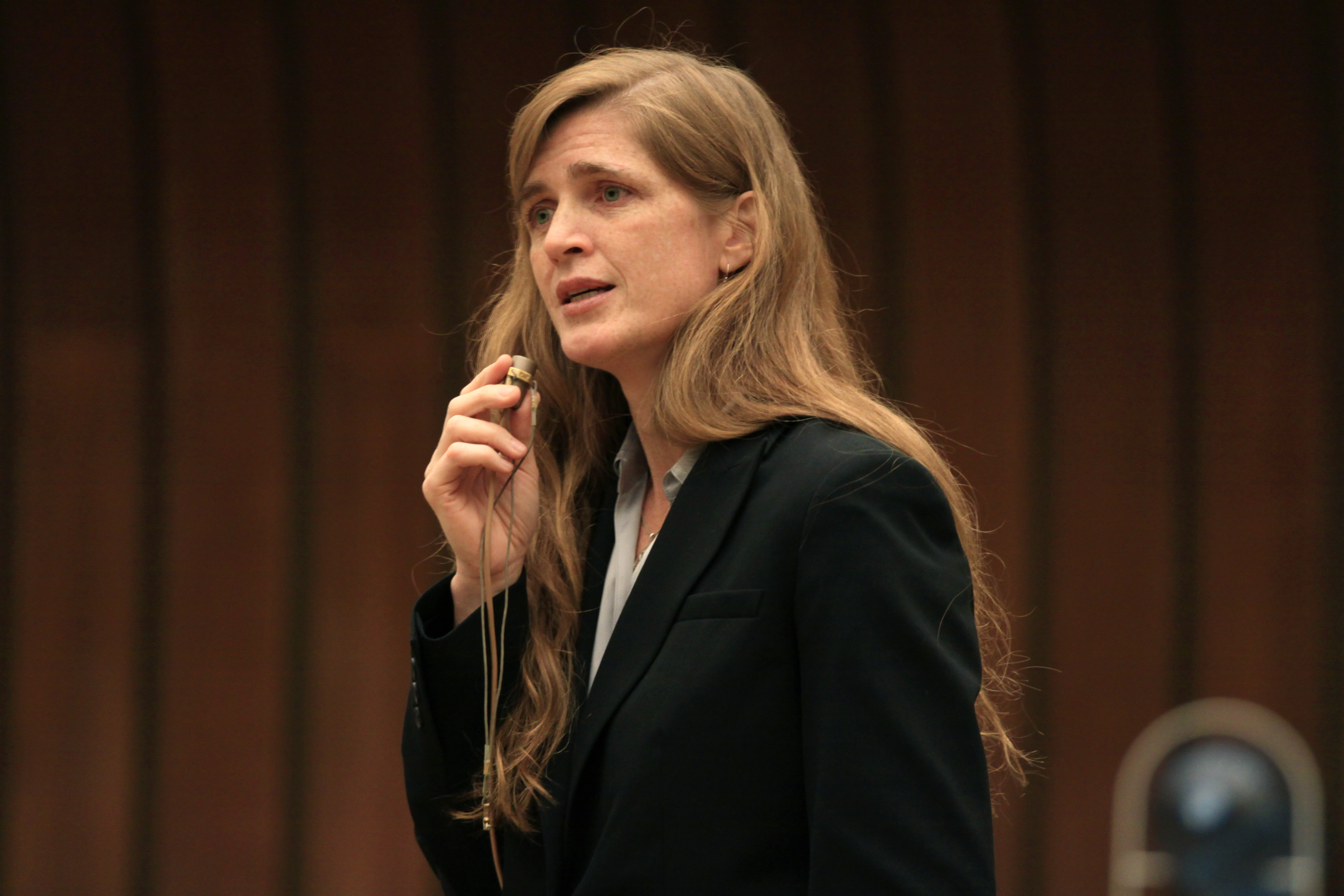
Samantha Power

FreeThe20 was a 2015 campaign to call attention to women who were political prisoners around the world. The campaign named twenty women who were imprisoned unjustly. Samantha Power, then U.S. ambassador to the United Nations, started the campaign for the twentieth anniversary of the Beijing Declaration.

The reason for the campaign was to tell governments to stop putting women in prison, and to tell the women and their families that they were not alone. There were twenty names of women in twenty days, one for every year since the Beijing Declaration.

In September 2015, a bipartisan "#FreeThe20" bill was introduced to the U.S Senate. All twenty women senators of the two political parties supported the bill. They said,

As 20 women serving in the United States Senate we stand unified in calling on governments to recognize the universal human rights of women and to release women who have been imprisoned unjustly for exercising those rights.

== Names of the women ==
- Day 20: Rasha Sharbaji, Syria (free)
- Day 19: Tạ Phong Tần, Vietnam (free)
- Day 18: Women Political Prisoners, North Korea
- Day 17: Nadiya Savchenko, Ukraine/Russia (free)
- Day 16: Naw Ohn Hla, Burma (free)
- Day 15: Sanaa Seif, Egypt (free)
- Day 14: Judge María Lourdes Afiuni Mora, Venezuela (free)
- Day 13: Bui Thi Minh Hang, Vietnam (free)
- Day 12: Liu Xia, China (free)
- Day 11: Phyoe Phyoe Aung, Burma (free)
- Day 10: Leyla Yunus, Azerbaijan (free)
- Day 9: Matlyuba Kamilova, Uzbekistan
- Day 8: Aster Yohannes, Eritrea
- Day 7: Gao Yu, China (free)
- Day 4-6: Blen Mesfin (free), Meron Alemayehu (free), and Nigist Wondifraw (free), Ethiopia
- Day 3: Bahareh Hedayat, Iran
- Day 2: Khadija Ismayilova, Azerbaijan (free)
- Day 1: Wang Yu, China (free)
