= Rasha Al Danhani =

Emirati businesswoman

- Born: UAE
- Occupations: Businesswoman; Entrepreneur
- Known for: PappaRoti

Rasha Al Danhani (Rasha Sharif Al Dhanhani) is an Emirati businesswoman and entrepreneur, who is the UAE owner of the PappaRoti coffeehouse chain.

== Education and early career ==
Al Danhani studied entrepreneurship at Dubai Women's College and graduated in 1998. She started her career working in the banking sector but moved to the real estate business.

== PappaRoti ==
In 2009, Al Danhani acquired the Malaysian brand PappaRoti (meaning 'Father of the bun' in Malaysian) that started in 2002, and turned it from a maker of buns and beverages into a coffee shop chain, with the coffee-coated bun as its signature. In an interview, Al Dahnhani said she bought the brand through her savings from her previous work and a loan from her father. The first store was a small kiosk opened in Dubai Mall in 2009, with a staff that included only five people. After five years, the number of locations exceeded 200 locations. As of February 2020, PappaRoti has over 400 stores and kiosks located mostly across the Middle East and eastern Asia, with locations in the United States, United Kingdom, Canada, Australia, France, Brazil, and other countries.

== Awards ==
In 2012, Al Danhani received the Mohammad Bin Rashid SME Fund's Entrepreneurial Personality of the Year. In 2013, she won the Entrepreneur of the Year Award at Arab Woman Awards UAE 2013, organized by ITP Publishing. In 2014, she was ranked #57 in the Forbes Middle East 200 Most Powerful Arab women.
