= Rasha Sharbaji =

Syrian political prisoner

Rasha Sharbaji, also Shurbaji, Chorbaji, (Arabic: رشا شربجي) is a Syrian mother who was arrested together with her children when she went to get a passport, as a means of putting pressure on her husband. Sharbaji's husband died in 2014 while attempting to migrate to Europe.

In 2016, Samantha Power, the U.S. Ambassador to the U.N., named Sharbaji one of twenty women political prisoners in the Free the 20 campaign.

== Life ==
Born in 1982, Sharbaji is from Darayya, a suburb of Damascus in Rif Dimashq Governorate.

On May 22, 2014, when Sharbaji went to the immigration and passport center in Damascus to get a passport, she was arrested with her children, because her husband opposed the government during the revolution.

Sharbaji was pregnant with twins. As the authorities wanted to arrest her husband, Osama Abbar, they imprisoned her and put her children in SOS Village, an orphanage in Qudsaya. The family was not permitted to see the children. The Syrian police took Sharbaji to the political security branch in Damascus. Then they took Sharbaji to the Air Force Intelligence prison at al-Mezze military airport in Damascus.

Sharbaji's husband died in October 2014. He drowned in the Mediterranean Sea while trying to migrate to Europe.

== FreeThe20 campaign ==
The Human Rights and Democracy Office in the US State Department asked Noor al-Khatib, from the Syrian Network for Human Rights for important cases of detention. The Syrian Network for Human Rights nominated Sharbaji, and also the cases of Dr. Rania Abbasi and Dr Faten Rajab for the FreeThe20 campaign. The State Department chose Sharbaji.

== See also ==
- FreeThe20 campaign
