= Luo Qianqian =

Luo Qianqian (罗茜茜) is a Chinese woman, currently residing in the United States. In 2017, she revealed that she has been sexually harassed by her previous professor, Chen Xiaowu (陈小武) in Beihang University, as a phd student, 13 years ago. Her case received significant media attention. She advocated for other victims of sexual harassment in China to speak about their experiences and use the hashtag #我也是 (woyeshi), meaning "me too".

== Sexual harassment by Chen Xiaowu ==
Qianqian was a Ph.D. student at Beihang University at the end of 2004. Her professor, Chen Xiaowu (陈小武), sexually harassed her in his sister's vacant apartment. Luo cried, saying that she was a virgin. Then, Chen stopped his actions and demanded that she will refrain from disclosing the occurrence. Chen also told her that he was only testing her moral standard. Luo was frightened by this incident.

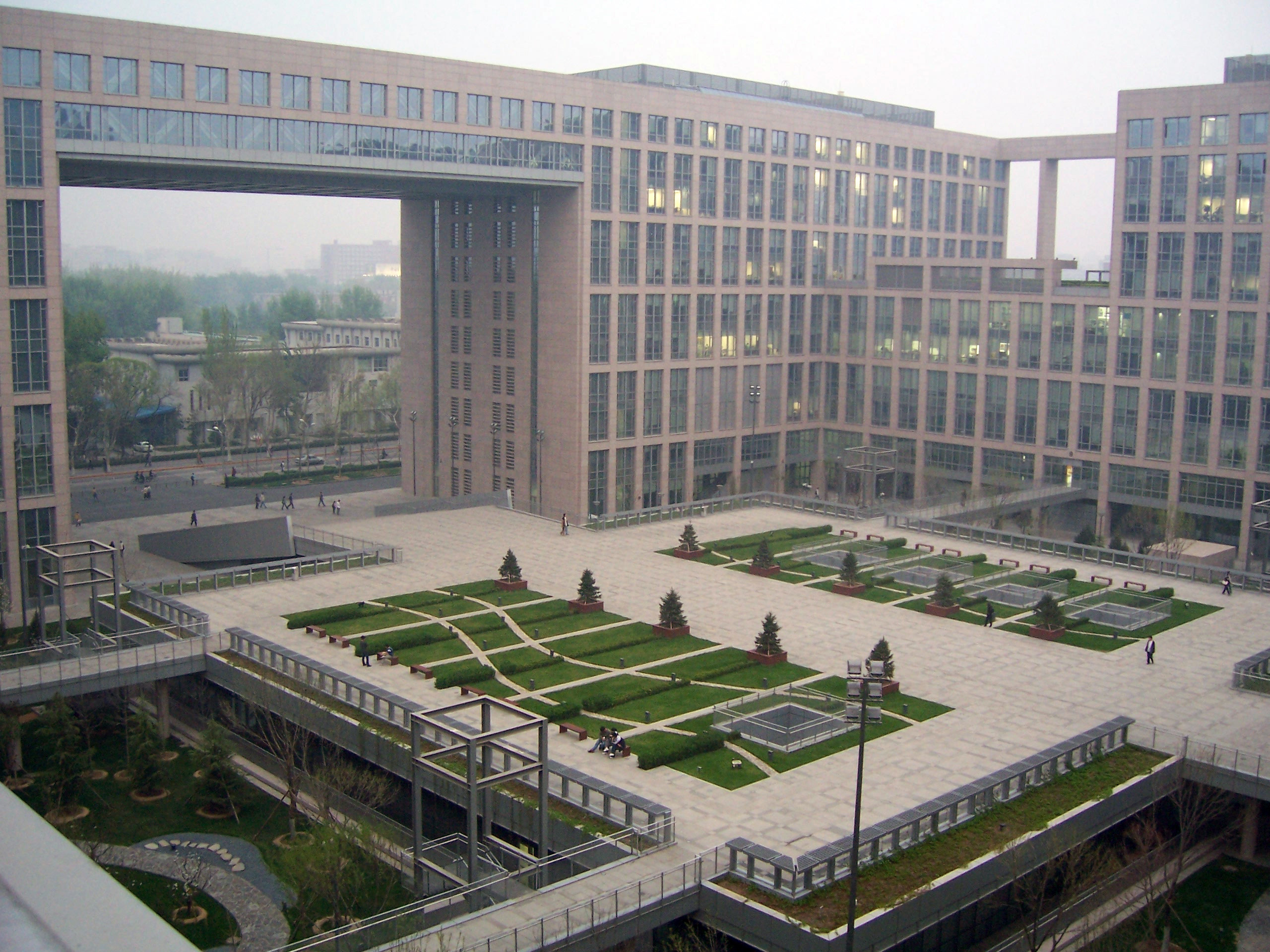
Beihang University where Luo Qianqian studied and the sexual harassment happened

After what had happened, Luo's Ph.D. years become very difficult, yet, she refrained for disclosing the occurrence. She was depressed and chose to study abroad as soon as possible due to her fear of facing Chen again.

== Report of the sexual harassment ==
Living in the US, Luo was inspired by the Me Too movement. She came across a Zhihu (a Chinese question-and-answer site) discussion board post which mentioned Chen's improper behaviour as a professor who sexually assaulted his students. Luo realized that she was not the only one who has suffered such harassment. Luo felt the need to act after she heard that Chen impregnated a student. She added a discussion post detailing the harassment she suffered by Chen in Beihang University.

In October 2017, Luo reported Chen. She made a public post about her story twelve years ago. Immediately thereafter, she received significant attention on Chinese social media, and five other students supported Luo and also accused Chen of sexual harassment. Luo also contacted other students who had been sexually assaulted by Chen and collected audio evidence before sending the allegations to the university.

Based on Beijing Youth Daily's report, Chen declared that his behaviour was not illegal, and this event might harm his reputation. He asked people to wait for more information and the outcome of the university's investigation. Beihang University also informed the public on their official Weibo website that they were investigating Chen. After the investigation, Beihang University decided to dismiss Chen as a professor and the vice president of the university's graduate program. Chen's academic title as "Yangtze River Scholar" was also removed by the Ministry of Education.

== Influence ==
In March, the Guangzhou Gender and Sexuality Education Centre found that seven out of ten university students have experienced sexual harassment. 75 percent of the victims are women. Nevertheless, a large number of the cases remain unreported. A student from Beihang University also states that there is no effective system to protect victims and handle their cases in Chinese schools. For the victims of sexual harassment in Chinese universities, the only way left to get the perpetrator punished is to bring attention to it on social media.

On 1 January, Luo stated that people should take action when they are sexually harassed. She encouraged people to use the hashtag #我也是 (Woyeshi), which means "me too" in Chinese. Consequently, many Chinese university students and alumni have petitioned online for universities to establish official sexual harassment policies. Similar to the #Metoo hashtag, they also use a hashtag called #Everyonein since they feel it is not enough to only include the ones who have experienced sexual harassment. People who are not victims should also support them and fight for justice in society,

On the Chinese internet, Luo's case also received significant attention. A student from Beihang University also complained that the current system did not provide much help for the victims of sexual violence or sexual harassment. Society discouraged victims to speak up since the environment is not safe. The posts on the internet could be deleted easily and the victims also face threats when they make accusations of sexual harassment.
