= Domestic violence in China =

Violence or abuse by intimate partners or family members against one another in China

Domestic violence in the People's Republic of China involves violence or abuse by intimate partners or family members against one another. Intimate partner violence (IPV) by the man is the most common type of domestic violence in China; a 2005 American Journal of Public Health report found that 1 out of 4 Chinese women had experienced physical violence from their partner in the past year. According to OECD estimates in 2023, 19% of Chinese women aged aged 15-49 who have ever been in an intimate partnership have faced intimate partner violence. Although the Republic of China acknowledged that domestic violence was a problem in the 1930s, it has only become a visible issue in the past few decades due to economic and social changes in the 1980s.

Domestic violence is legally defined in Article 2 of the Domestic Violence Law of 2015 as "physical, psychological or other infractions between family members affected through the use of methods such as beatings, restraints, maiming, restrictions on physical liberty as well as recurrent verbal abuse or intimidation." Although the legal definition is confined to family members, domestic violence can also occur between unmarried, LGBT, and other domestic couples. Domestic violence is a prevalent issue throughout China, with rural areas being particularly affected. The majority of women enduring domestic violence, accounting for 40% of cases in China, reside in rural regions. Despite the government's ongoing initiatives to eliminate poverty, rural areas continue to grapple with elevated poverty rates, which consequently amplify the risk factors associated with domestic violence.

== History and causes ==
=== Traditional family dynamics ===
Historically, Chinese families followed a hierarchical structure in which the husband had authority over most household decisions. This patriarchal ordering has its roots in Confucianism, which establishes codes of conduct for women that typically places them below their husbands. In particular, the Three Obediences and Four Virtues call for the wife to obey her father, husband, and son while maintaining a modest and moral lifestyle. While Confucianism also advocates for social harmony and peace, beating one's wife was considered an appropriate way to discipline her. As the household was the man's domain, any violence he committed against his wife was generally seen as his family's private matter and subsequently disregarded.

As a consequence of the hierarchical structure, the husband has traditionally been the main provider for the family while the wife has been the caretaker—this relationship was even apparent in the Chinese language, as one of the traditional characters for a woman (Simplified Chinese: 妇女; Traditional Chinese: 婦女; Pinyin: fù nǚ) depicts a woman cleaning with a broom. Having only a reproductive role in the family, the wife was typically dependent on the husband and therefore unable to protest or leave when she was beaten. Moreover, the act of protesting against one's husband not only disrupted the social harmony of the family, but also demonstrated a lack of obedience and modesty—if a wife were to leave her husband, she would dishonor her family and provoke the disdain of the community.

=== Recent history ===
In the early 20th century, wife-beating was still a regularly occurring practice and deemed to be an acceptable tool to assert male dominance. Although there were organizations such as the All-China Women's Federation (ACWF) established by the Chinese Communist Party, these state-established organizations did not exert much effort on domestic violence issues in the mid 20th century.

Following the 1980s, a mixture of factors including China's increasing international presence, improved academic and employment opportunities for women, and a more open political climate led to strengthened efforts to address domestic violence and, in particular, violence against women. This included local initiatives, such as the work of Liang Jun, who campaigned against domestic violence, particularly in rural communities in the 1980s.

A large factor for this change was China's involvement in various United Nations conferences geared towards women and family issues in the 1990s. The World Conference on Women hosted in China in 1995, in particular, allowed Chinese activists to come in contact with numerous international women's organizations and openly discuss the issue of domestic violence. During this period, grassroots women's organizations such as the Women's Research Institute were being founded, breaking into a field of activism that only the ACWF historically occupied.

As public awareness of the domestic violence issue grew, initial studies on domestic violence began to appear. Different studies by the ACWF, the Beijing Institute of Marriage and Family, the Population Research Institute at the Chinese Academy of Social Sciences, and other organizations reported rates from 1.6% of women to approximately a quarter of women that were beaten by their husbands at some point. As no studies were available to compare these numbers to prior to the 1980s, it was difficult to make qualitative assessments on the varying results; however, researchers were doubtful that these figures were an accurate representation of the scale of domestic violence in China.

== Prevention ==
Domestic violence was first mentioned in the 1995 National Program for the Development of Women, which called for the prevention of domestic violence to be a large priority. Although this was the first time in which domestic violence was explicitly mentioned, it had already been made implicitly illegal by various legal documents. The Constitution of China, the General Principles of the Civil Law of the People's Republic of China, the Second Marriage Law of 1980, and the Law on the Protection of Women's Rights and Interests all contain provisions that prohibit the abuse of women and family members in general. Even though domestic violence had been implicitly and then officially illegal, in reality there were no mechanisms through which abused women could seek legal reparations in the 20th century.

=== Law ===
==== Marriage Law Amendment of 2001 ====
The first form of legal defense for victims of domestic violence appeared in the 2001 amendment to the Second Marriage Law. In a judicial interpretation of the law, the Supreme People's Court legally defined domestic violence as "behavior towards a family member that results in injurious consequences physically, emotionally, or in other ways by 'beating, tying up, injuring, forcibly restricting one's personal freedom, or by other means.'" The amendment included three important changes:

- Article 32(3)(2) holds that if mediation fails, divorce will be allowed if there are instances of family violence, maltreatment, or abandonment.
- Article 43 calls on the neighborhood committee or villagers committee to mediate cases of family violence, take measures to stop the violence, and impose administrative penalties on the offender.
- Article 46(3) and (4) grants the victim of domestic violence the right to claim compensation.

The 2005 amendments to the Women's Protection Law affirmed the steps taken in the Marriage Law amendments. In particular, the amendments to the Women's Protection Law took it one step forward and explicitly stated in Article 46 that "Domestic violence against women is prohibited."

==== Domestic Violence Law of 2015 ====
In November 2014, the State Council proposed China's first domestic violence law. The law was passed by Parliament in July 2015, and took effect on March 1, 2016. The law reaffirms the advancements made in previous laws and offers a few novel provisions:

- Article 6 emphasizes the need for more publicity and education on the issue in schools and in the media.
- Article 19 calls for legal aid organizations to provide legal aid to victims of domestic violence and for courts to "delay, reduce, or waive litigation fees for victims of domestic violence in accordance with law."
- Article 21 empowers courts to revoke guardianship and appoint another guardian in cases of child abuse (and requires offenders to continue to provide financial support).
- Article 23 allows victims of domestic violence to apply for a personal safety protection order (the equivalent of a restraining order).
- Article 37 expands the law to cover domestic violence between persons who are not family members.

==== Divorce "Cooling-off Period" Restriction of 2021 ====
In an effort to combat the nation's increasing divorce rates, the mandatory divorce "cooling-off period" (Simplified Chinese: 冷静期; Traditional Chinese: 冷靜期; Pinyin: lěng jìng qī) was implemented by the Chinese government on January 1, 2021. It is part of China's first ever civil code, passed by the National People's Congress on May 29, 2020. The civil code requires Chinese couples filing for consensual divorce to wait 30 days in order to rethink their decision to apply. According to its creators, the purpose of the "cooling-off period" is to discourage impulsive divorces, especially for couples with young children. Requests for divorce are not processed until the 30 days is over.

Articles 1076, 1077, and 1078 of the Civil Code stipulate the following:

- Consensual divorce is to be a five step process: application, acceptance, cooling-off period, review, and registration (certification).
- If one spouse changes their mind about divorce within the month-long period, the divorce application can be withdrawn.
- Within 30 days after the end of the "cooling-off period", both parties must apply for the issuance of a divorce certificate.
- If either party fails to apply for a divorce certificate within the 30 days after the "cooling-off period", the divorce application will be withdrawn.

Although the "cooling-off period" does not apply to spouses seeking divorce due to domestic violence or extramarital affairs, it has received criticism for not protecting women from their husbands' domestic abuse. Prominent Chinese feminist Li Tingting believes that the law has the potential to harm women's rights, as the rate of determination of domestic violence in divorce cases is low in judicial practice. Additionally, users online on platforms such as Weibo also expressed frustration with the government's involvement in private interpersonal relationships, using the hashtag "oppose the divorce cool-off period".

==== July 2022 Guidelines by the Supreme People's Court ====
In 2022, China's highest court issued guidelines that make it easier for domestic violence victims to obtain personal protection orders. The guidelines broadens the definition of domestic violence to include additional conduct such as stalking, harassment, and verbal abuse; it also lowers the threshold for proof.

=== Other Efforts ===
==== Legal Services and Governmental Entities ====
According to the report published in 2017 on the implementation of the Domestic Violence Law of 2015, there are more than 2,000 shelter locations provided for victims of domestic violence across the country. However, most of these shelters are not very well-equipped for providing assistance to the victims often because they do not have the resources to the basic needs of victims or the staff is not knowledgeable enough about how to help domestic violence victims.

Some social work service centers, women-rights organizations, and women and children legal support centers also provided shelter and legal support to victims and/or launched local campaigns against domestic violence.

==== Anti-domestic Violence Grassroots Campaigns ====
On Valentine's Day of 2012, a group of Chinese feminist activists, including Li Tingting, dressed up as brides on streets in Beijing wearing wedding dresses with red stains to represent blood and wearing heavy make-up as if they were beaten. Some of them also held up signs with slogans against domestic violence. In December 2012, more young Chinese women's rights activists went on the street to protest against domestic violence in a similar fashion in five major Chinese cities: Hangzhou, Shanghai, Guangzhou, Xi'an, and Dongguan. Later in 2013 and 2014, similar performances occurred on the street in other cities including Zhengzhou, Yunnan, and Shenzhen. Historically, they are collectively referred to as "The Bloody Brides" campaign.

== Incidence and statistics ==
While violence against women is the most common manifestation of domestic violence, it is not the only form. Domestic violence includes violence against any member within a household by a relative or partner.

In terms of detailed statistics, though the ACWF and the National Bureau of Statistics of China release reports on domestic violence issues revealing the number of cases and victims, there currently is no well-organized official database. News and related articles calling for more attention, even in official news reports by the ACWF use the same statistics repeatedly while up-to-date surveys are conducted with joint efforts.

A 2004 survey by the ACWF found that 16% of families experiences male-on-female violence, whereas 30% of families had experienced domestic violence in general. In more recent years, the National Bureau of Statistics of China and the Third Survey of Social Status of Women by the ACWF reported that in the year of 2010 alone, 24.7% of women aged between 24 and 60 experienced domestic violence in different forms and the ACWF received about 40,000 - 50,000 complaints about domestic violence. These incidents continue despite laws against domestic violence due to deeply rooted patriarchal norms in Chinese society.

A 2021 report from the State Council of People's Republic of China on anti-domestic violence work revealed that the proportion of women suffering from both physical and mental impacts of domestic violence in marriage has dropped to 8.6%, from 13.8% in 2010.

The ACWF released its latest data on domestic violence along with the National Bureau of Statistics of China in 2022, where the reported filed cases related to domestic violence rose to 94,571. The proportion of families undertaking the influence of domestic violence still hovers at a level of 30%, among a total of 270 million families in China. Over 100 thousand families "have been destructed" due to domestic violence each year over the past decade. In the filed cases, 70% of the victims combine both female member and the child who undertook violence from the male member in the family of three to four.

According to OECD estimates in 2023, 19% of Chinese women aged aged 15-49 who have ever been in an intimate partnership have faced intimate partner violence, compared to 18% in the European Union, 20% in Japan, 26% in the United States and 35% in India.

=== Children ===
With respect to children, domestic violence in China is a largely ignored issue due to the nebulous distinction between discipline and child abuse. Although a more common sentiment prior to the 1980s, the saying "beating is caring and scolding is intimacy" still holds traction for some families. A study of Hong Kong minors in May 1998 found that 52.9% of Chinese families experienced instances of minor violence (throwing objects, pushing, slapping) against children, and 46.1% of Chinese families experienced instances of severe violence (kicking, punching, threatening or beating with a weapon). A 2001 survey by the China Law Society corroborated these results, finding that 71.9% of the 3543 people surveyed had been beaten by their parents when they were children.

The Hong Kong study further found that children aged 3–6 were most likely to suffer from child abuse, and boys were more likely to suffer from severe violence by their parents than girls. The likelihood of physical abuse also increased if a child had no siblings. These trends largely reflect the interconnected relationship between abuse and discipline in Chinese families—parents generally see sons and single children as the future of the household and are consequently more strict with their upbringing. Despite its prevalence, child abuse is taken relatively lightly in the Chinese legal system. In 1998, child maltreatment cases comprised 0.29% of all cases for the People's Court in Beijing.

=== Gender differences ===
A 2004 International Family Planning Perspectives survey found that, including mutual violence, 34% of respondents had experienced male-on-female violence and 18% had experienced female-on-male violence. In addition, 12% of women and 5% of men reported suffering severe violence. In a 2008 meta-study of various studies on IPV, 19.7% of women were found to have experienced violence by their male partners at some point, while 16.8% of women experienced violence in the past year. Similarly, approximately 10% of women had experienced sexual violence at some point in their life, while 5.4% of women experienced sexual violence in the past year. Men are also more likely than women to acknowledge that the wife had suffered violence in their relationship, which attests to the general under reporting phenomenon with male-on-female violence. Domestic violence also increased with sexual jealousy, with male-on-female violence becoming more likely if the woman was jealous and mutual hitting was more likely if the man was jealous.

=== Regional differences ===
Compared to the 15% of women in urban settings, 28.3% of women in rural settings reported violence by a male partner. Moreover, while younger age increased the likelihood of abuse for women in urban settings, greater age was found to correlate with the likelihood of abuse for women in rural areas. Domestic violence was also found to be more likely in central areas and the North than in the South, with rates of 22%, 14%, and 11% respectively. Female-on-male violence was found to be more prominent in the North than in other areas.

== See also ==
- Women in China
- Crime in China
- Domestic violence
- Intimate partner violence
