= Queer Lala Times =

Online publication in China, 2013–2016

Queer Lala Times (酷拉时报/酷拉時報) was a queer electronic publication active in mainland China from 2013 to 2016. It was organized and published by the Chinese Lala Alliance (CLA), and operated on a number of online platforms (Douban, WeChat, Sina Weibo, Facebook). The publication looked at a wide variety of topics from lesbian and adopted intersectional approaches towards gender and sexuality that go beyond the predominant voices of the gay communities in China at that time. The publication emphasized the diversity of voices and feminism in the broader Chinese-speaking context.

== The word Lala ==
Lala (拉拉) is a self-identifying term used by many lesbians in Chinese-speaking regions.

== The social environment ==
LGBTQ activism in mainland China started in 1995, stemming from concerns regarding HIV/AIDS transmission prevention among the gay Chinese population with NGO intervention and government support, hoping to combat the issue. Thus activism of gay men in China was fundamentally different from the lesbians in terms of public awareness. With time, the focus of rights protection shifted from framing homosexuality as a public health issue to perceiving it as a human rights issue and a focal point for anti-discriminatory movements towards the sexual and gender minority populations by 2012.

The terms used as well as the ideologies adopted in mainland China were undeniably influenced by Hong Kong and Taiwan, with Taiwan being recognized as one of the most liberal of all Chinese-speaking entities. The "internalization" processes of values that slowly began to take place in 2005 built the foundation for activism to later take place in mainland China. The transnational collaboration and alliance through social media was made possible through the greater exchanges of people across Chinese-speaking regions during the period of 2008 to 2016. They fuelled the increasing awareness and needs for activism, which eventually slowed after the 2016 Taiwan election.

== Chinese Lala Alliance (CLA) ==
The Chinese Lala Alliance (CLA) is the organization behind the Queer Lala Times. It was established in 2008 through the alliance of individuals and groups across Chinese-speaking regions, including mainland China, Macau, Taiwan, Hong Kong, and the Chinese population in other parts of the world, such as in the US. The history of the alliance can be dated back to 2007, when they started holding annual "la-la camps", where eventually, key activists and leaders came together to establish the organization. They adopted the usage of both offline networking and online community building to expand their scope of influence. They were active across various online social platforms, including Douban, WeChat, and Sina Weibo in mainland China, and Facebook in other Chinese-speaking regions across the globe.

The alliance hopes to provide a platform for sharing and communication for all sexual and gender minority groups, as claimed in their statement: "We are Lala(LBT); we are not dissoluble under the umbrellas of "women", "gay", "homosexuality". We are queer; we are not content with the binarism of gay/straight, men/women, normal/pervert. We seek diverse narratives that speak to the complexity of the world, and we seek a more diverse reality."

== Queer Lala Times ==
The establishment of the Queer Lala Times publication built off their belief in the power of words and the importance of making gender/sexuality minority groups' voices heard in Chinese-speaking regions, and to counter homonormativity. It is a virtual magazine that published two volumes, one in 2014 and one in 2015. For both volumes, the publications covered sections that discussed academic theories, current issues, as well as focused on special topics on transgender, Bi/pansexual, cooperative marriage and queer and religions.

The publication was publicly active in mainland China from 2013 to 2016. In 2017, most of the online accounts were removed due to censorship. However, several online archives kept copies of the publications, such as the Stanford online archive which kept screenshots of their Sina Weibo account and cnLBGTdata.
