= Rasha Samir =

Egyptian dentist and writer

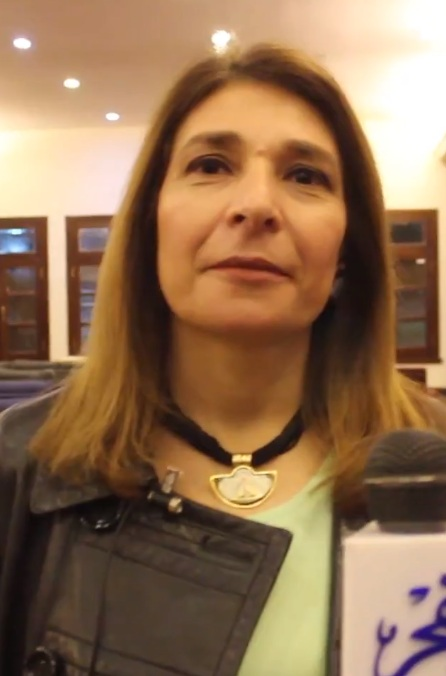
- Rasha Samair, 12 February 2013
- Born: 1 January; Cairo, Egypt
- Education: M.A. in dental surgery
- Alma mater: Cairo University
- Occupations: Writer, novelist, dentist, and journalist
- Years active: 1995– present

Rasha Samir (Arabic: رشا سمير) is an Egyptian writer, novelist, dentist, and journalist. She has published six-story collections and four novels. Her novel ‘Jawari El Ishq’ will be turned into a television series produced by MBC. Samir is the first Egyptian woman and novelist who runs Ihsan Abdel Quddous’ cultural book salon. She is also a member in Egypt Writers Union.

== Biography ==
Rasha Samir was born on 1st January in Cairo, Egypt. She holds an M.A. in dental surgery from Cairo University. Her interest in reading during childhood encouraged her to start her literary career at a young age by writing thoughts at the age of 15. However, she was able to publish her first story collection ‘Hwaneet Arafa’ in 1995. She continued writing short stories until 2011 when she published her first novel ‘Banat Fi Hikayat’.

Samir's novel ‘Jawary El Ishq’ caught the attention of MBC group which contracted with Samir to own the copyright of the novel to turn it into a television series. ‘Jawary El Ishq’ is a historical novel addresses women's freedom by talking about three women of different historical periods: ‘Qamer’, a concubine belongs to Mamluk period, ‘Mahishid’ who belongs to the 70s, and ‘Isil’ who belongs to the current period, particularly after the Egyptian revolution of 2011.

Samir writes both short stories and novels. So far, she has published six-story collections including ‘Mabd Al Hob’ and four novels including ‘Lil Qalb Marsa Akhar’ which was published in 2020. Samir writes in various styles. She has written a social novel ‘Banat Fi Hikayat’, historical novels including ‘Jawary El Ishq’, and a sarcastic novel ‘Yaani Eh Raga?’ which is the only sarcastic novel of Samir.

Aside from her literary works, she has been publishing a weekly column for ten years in ‘Al-fajr’ newspaper. She also used to publish in ‘Sout Al Omma Newspaper’, ‘Nahdet Misr Newspaper’, and in ‘Sabah El Kheir Magazine’.

== Works ==
=== Story Collections ===
- Stores of A Fortune teller (Original title: Hawaneet Arrafa), 1995.
- Love Temple (Original title: Mabd Al Hob), 2000 (ISBN 977-01-7143-3)
- Love Behind Al Mashrabiya (Original title: Hob Khalf Al Mashrabiya), 2005.
- What Does Man Mean? (Original title: Yaeni Eh Ragal?), 2011.
- Duet (by Rasha Samir and Hisham al-Khashin), 2013
- What Does Man Mean? Part II (Original title: Yaeni Eh Ragal?-II), 2019 (ISBN 978-977-795-203-3)

=== Novels ===
- Girls in Tales (Original title: Banat Fi Hikayat), 2011 (ISBN 978-977-293-689-2)
- Concubines of Love (Original title: Jawary Al Ishq), 2014 (ISBN 978-977-293-718-9)
- I Will Meet You There (Original title: Saelqaq Hounak), 2017 (ISBN 978-977-795-106-7)
- The Heart Has a Last Berth (Original title: Lil Qalb Marsa Akhir), 2020 (ISBN 978-977-795-271-2)
