= Rasha Shehada =

- Born: 1985 or 1986 (age 39–40); Palestine
- Education: American University of Sharjah
- Occupation: Managing Director

Rasha Shehada (Arabic: رشا شحادة) is a Palestinian Managing Director, who works for her family importation business, Diamond Line, in the United Arab Emirates.

== Career ==
Rasha Shehada was born in Palestine, as the middle child of three siblings. She moved to the United Arab Emirates as a child with her family, initially living in Abu Dhabi. Her father set up an importation business called Diamond Line. Shehada attended the American University of Sharjah, graduating in 2007. Initially she worked in international marketing after graduation.

Shehada began working for the family business, and in 2011, travelled to Ohio as part of a Middle Eastern–American exchange programme for small business owners. She said that she saw similarities between in the family-run businesses she saw while in the United States. She began working for the company in business development, and convinced her father to begin investing in training for existing staff rather than hiring consultants.

Prior to her father's retirement, he split ownership of the company into equal parts between his three children. Shehada's brother and sister elected to have her become managing director in 2013. Her first task was to refocus the company into its chafing oil importation business, rather than also offering general hotel supplies. She was listed by Forbes as one of the most influence women in the region in a family business, and was included in the BBC's 100 Women programme in 2015 as part of the 30under30 group.
