= Li Tingting =

Chinese activist (born 1989)

- 李婷婷
- Born: 1989 (age 36–37); Hongtongying, Beijing
- Other name: Li Maizi
- Occupation: Activist
- Known for: Gender equality advocacy

Li Tingting (Chinese: 李婷婷; pinyin: Lǐ Tíngtíng; born 1989), known professionally as Li Maizi (Chinese: 李麦子), is a Chinese activist and campaigner for gender equality, sexual harassment awareness, and sexuality. She was detained by police on the eve of International Women's Day in 2015, along with four other activists from the "Feminist Five", for planning to protest sexual harassment on public transport.

== Early life and education ==
Li's parents were forced to marry as a young couple after becoming pregnant with her. In 1989, Li was born in Yanqing district, the rural outskirts of Beijing. Li's father worked delivering fertilizer. After her father was dismissed from his work, Li's mother took a factory job in Beijing, but continued to be responsible for all domestic matters. According to Li, her father was "rather chauvinistic". She and her mother suffered beatings from her father when she was growing up.

Li moved around and lived in different places in Beijing to pursue an education. When Li was three years old, her family moved to Shunyi district for her mother's job. At seven years old, Li moved back to Yanqing district to go to school due to her hukou. She then moved back to Shunyi after solving her hukou problem. For high school, she attended Shunyi No.10 School and chose to study the liberal arts.

=== Discovery of lesbian identity ===
Li realised she was a lesbian while she was in middle school. During high school, she began a relationship with her best friend from middle school. The relationship later ended because her girlfriend feared that others would discover her lesbian identity, which many people at the time regarded as an illness. The breakup deeply upset Li, and she sought comfort from another friend. Instead of receiving support, she was called a "la la", a derogatory term for a lesbian. Feeling rejected and hopeless, Li attempted suicide but survived. This experience led her to change her name from Tingting, a traditionally feminine name, to Maizi, meaning "rice plant" in Mandarin. To Li, the name Maizi represented freedom and humility. In 2008, she enrolled at Chang'an University in Xi'an, where she studied public administration.

== Activism ==
Li's activism career started during her undergraduate studies. When a friend of hers was pregnant, Li started to give sexual education to her peers. During her second year of university, Li set up a Lesbian Community Training Group, offering counseling services and support for university students. By 2013, the Group consisted of some 200 active volunteers, who advocated for equal-rights legislation and highlighted discriminatory behavior in government and business. In 2011, Li learned about "performance art" (a term used to avoid the political sensitivity of "protest") and was immediately interested in leveraging performance art in her activism.

=== Hurt bride ===
In 2012 Valentine's Day, she and two other volunteers walked down a shopping street in Beijing wearing bridal gowns spattered with blood stains to draw attention to domestic violence in China. Although the crowds were mainly receptive, many observers were reportedly awkward at personal matters being aired in public. During the event, urban management officials followed the three women, reprimanding them for not registering their demonstration. On the next day, multiple media reported the Li's demonstration.

=== Occupy Men's Room ===
Li also led the Occupy Men's Room (Chinese: 占领男厕所) demonstration with Zheng Churan. With this demonstration, Li and colleagues protested the usual long queues in front of women's toilet. The demonstration started on 19 February 2012 in Guangzhou. As a result, the Guangzhou government agreed to expand women's toilet by 150%. On 26 February the same demonstration started in Beijing. This resulted in Li being questioned by the police. From 2012 to 2017, multiple demonstrations happened in major cities throughout China, resulting in a new Regulation on Public Toilet Design Standard. This demonstration drew much attention from national and international media, as well as online discussion, particularly for the way it encouraged male solidarity with a gendered cause.

=== Head shaving ===
In August 2012, Li and four other women shaved their heads publicly in Lychee Bay, Guangzhou, China. This demonstration was to protest against gender discrimination in entrance into higher education, as some institutions required girls to have higher scores than boys to be admitted.

=== Dongfang Bubai at a career fair ===
In 2013, at a career fair in Xi'an, Li arrived as Dongfang Bubai, a fictional character with high martial arts skills. Dongfang Bubai castrated himself to fulfil the prerequisite for learning the skills in a martial arts manual known as the Sunflower Manual (葵花寶典). With this character, Li drew attention to workplace gender discrimination, as many positions only wanted male employees.

=== Not your green tea, nor your slut ===
On 8 April 2013, Li and two friends wore Sailor Moon costumes and held the sign "Not your green tea, nor your slut". With this demonstration, Li drew attention to new vocabularies, such as "green tea slut" and "black jelly ear", that are in particular discriminatory of women and protested against verbal violence.

=== Forced marriage ===
In a 2016 video release, Li stated that her current campaign work focusses on preventing forced marriage.

== Detention ==
On 6 March 2015, police officers arrived at Li's apartment where she was living with her partner. Around that time, Li and colleagues were planning a demonstration drawing attention to sexual harassment in public transportations on International Women's Day in three cities. At first, since Li couldn't do anything, Li pulled out her ukulele and played a song, while her girlfriend sang. Li initially did not open the door and overheard conversation between the officers that they had monitored her phone calls. She eventually opened the door when the officers called a locksmith to break through the door. Li reports that the police presented her with a blank detention warrant, searched her apartment and confiscated both her and her partner's electronics. The police then took Li and her partner away in separate vehicles. Li was first taken to the local police station, where police went through her private phone calls. When requested to unlock her phone, Li took the opportunity to delete her WeChat history.

On the evening of 7 March, Li was led to a basement carpark and driven away in a van. Her partner had already been released, but the van held fellow activists Wei Tingting and Wang Man. The activists were subjected to repetitive questioning by authorities about the planned anti-sexual harassment activity. The questions moved on to the involvement of foreign forces, which Li reports seemed to have made the authorities extremely nervous. Li was also asked about other public protests she had been involved in. The authorities even printed images of a topless protest, censoring the activists' nipples with black crosses. The office of the NGO Li worked for was also raided, as it was through this work that she had been most involved with gender equality advocacy and LGBT work. Although the authorities wanted information about this company, Li was not in a management position. Since her release, Li has stated that the authorities would suddenly burst into the room and shout: "Li Tingting, you haven't been honest with us, you're lying again!" Then attempt to intimidate with non-specified new evidence.

After 37 days of detention, on 13 April 2015, Li was released, along with the other four activists, who later became the Feminist Five. According to her lawyer, the release was conditional, which would allow charges to be brought against Li later.

== Aftermath and continual activist works ==
Li has reportedly been put on the Chinese media blacklist, which means no national media will report on or converse with her. The NGO Li worked for was also shut down as an example.

Li graduated from the University of Essex in February 2019.

Li has written opinion pieces for international media, including The Guardian, where she describes her arrest and the situation of women's rights in China. She has also participated in discussion panels and given talks on feminism in China in the United States and UK. In April 2023, Li started a new round of "Occupy Men's Room" activities in China.

Li left China in the summer of 2023, and now lives in New York with her wife.

== Awards ==
- 100 Women (BBC) - 2015
- Gold Award, Contemporary Art Schools' Students' Nominated Exhibition, Today's Art Museum - 2007
- Honorable Award, Shanghai Youth Art Exhibition - 2007

== Exhibitions ==
Li has had 36 exhibitions from 2005 to 2013. She had:

- 1 exhibition in 2013
- 5 exhibitions in 2012
- 5 exhibitions in 2011
- 5 exhibitions in 2010
- 9 exhibitions in 2009
- 4 exhibitions in 2008
- 5 exhibitions in 2007
- 1 exhibition in 2006 and 1 in 2005

== Art ==
Li Tingting's art is a contemporary modern style. Most of her pieces are watercolor, usually majority blue or pink. Her art often features landscapes, still life, and repeated or a "pile" of one object (usually plastic bottles or glasses).
