= Wu Rongrong =

Feminist and women's rights activist

- 武嵘嵘
- Born: 1985 (age 40–41); Jiaocheng County, Shanxi, China

Wu Rongrong (Chinese: 武嵘嵘; born 1985) is a Chinese feminist and a women's rights activist. She is a member of one of the larger feminist collectives in China known as the "Feminist Five" or the "Gang of Five".

== Early life and career ==
Wu Rongrong was born in 1985 in Jiaocheng County, Lüliang, Shanxi Province in North China. She attended China Women's University and majored in social work. She spent nearly two years volunteering at China Children's Press and Publication Group, a news and publication organization under the Communist Youth League of China that promotes youth activities and social engagement. She also spent nearly four years as a volunteer at New Path Foundation in China.

Wu experienced sexual harassment from her hometown's village officials during her university years. She attributes the patriarchal environment in which she grew up as a cause for her later activism for women's rights. It was also during her university years that she was diagnosed with hepatitis B.

Wu established the Weizhiming Women's Center in Hangzhou in 2014 and is its executive director. Previously, Wu was the project leader for women's rights programs at the Beijing Yirenping Center, an organization dedicated to social justice and public health, and a staff member of the Beijing Aizhixing Institute, China's leading non-governmental organization on the rights of people infected with HIV/AIDS.

== Activism ==
In 2015, to mark International Women's Day on 8 March, Wu and some other Chinese feminism activists, including the Five, planned to hand out pamphlets on public buses and subways to raise awareness on sexual harassment. However, their plan was thwarted by the police and ten activists were detained and faced public disorder charges. While detained, Wu was denied her hepatitis medication, leading to a deteriorating health condition. On 13 April, after weeks of detention, Wu was released from custody on bail together with four other activists. After the release, Wu's husband said in a telephone interview that Wu was "emotionally collapsed" from the foul language and threats she was subjected to in jail.

The activism of Wu and others received international support during this time. Hillary Clinton, running as a Democratic presidential candidate at the time, tweeted "The detention of Chinese women's activists must end" and described the government action as "inexcusable." John Kerry, then U.S. Secretary of State, made similar comments to call for the release of the activists.

In 2017, Wu was denied a permit to study law in Hong Kong by the local county security authority in Shanxi Province, despite the fact that she was already accepted by the University of Hong Kong prior to the block and granted a visa by the Hong Kong Immigration Department. In addition, she received a ten-year ban from leaving the country. However, through lengthy negotiations, she was granted permission to go to Hong Kong a week later.

When the #MeToo movement gathered momentum globally, Wu offered support and advice to activists campaigning for policies to prevent sexual harassment in Chinese universities.
