= MeToo movement in South Korea =

Movement against sexual abuse and harassment

The MeToo movement has been active in South Korea since the late 2010s.

== Origin ==
The inciting incident for the MeToo movement in South Korea was when Seo Ji-hyun, an incumbent prosecutor in South Korea (the 33rd class of the Judicial Research and Training Institute), posted a message on the e-pros bulletin board of the prosecution's internal network on January 29, 2018, and later appeared on JTBC's newsroom, confessing to sexual harassment for the first time through interviews.

The incident angered many Koreans, and the incident triggered the spread of the Korean version of the #MeToo movement. In the end, the commission said it would conduct an investigation into sexual violence within the prosecution.

== Incidents by field ==
=== Culture ===
==== Go Eun ====
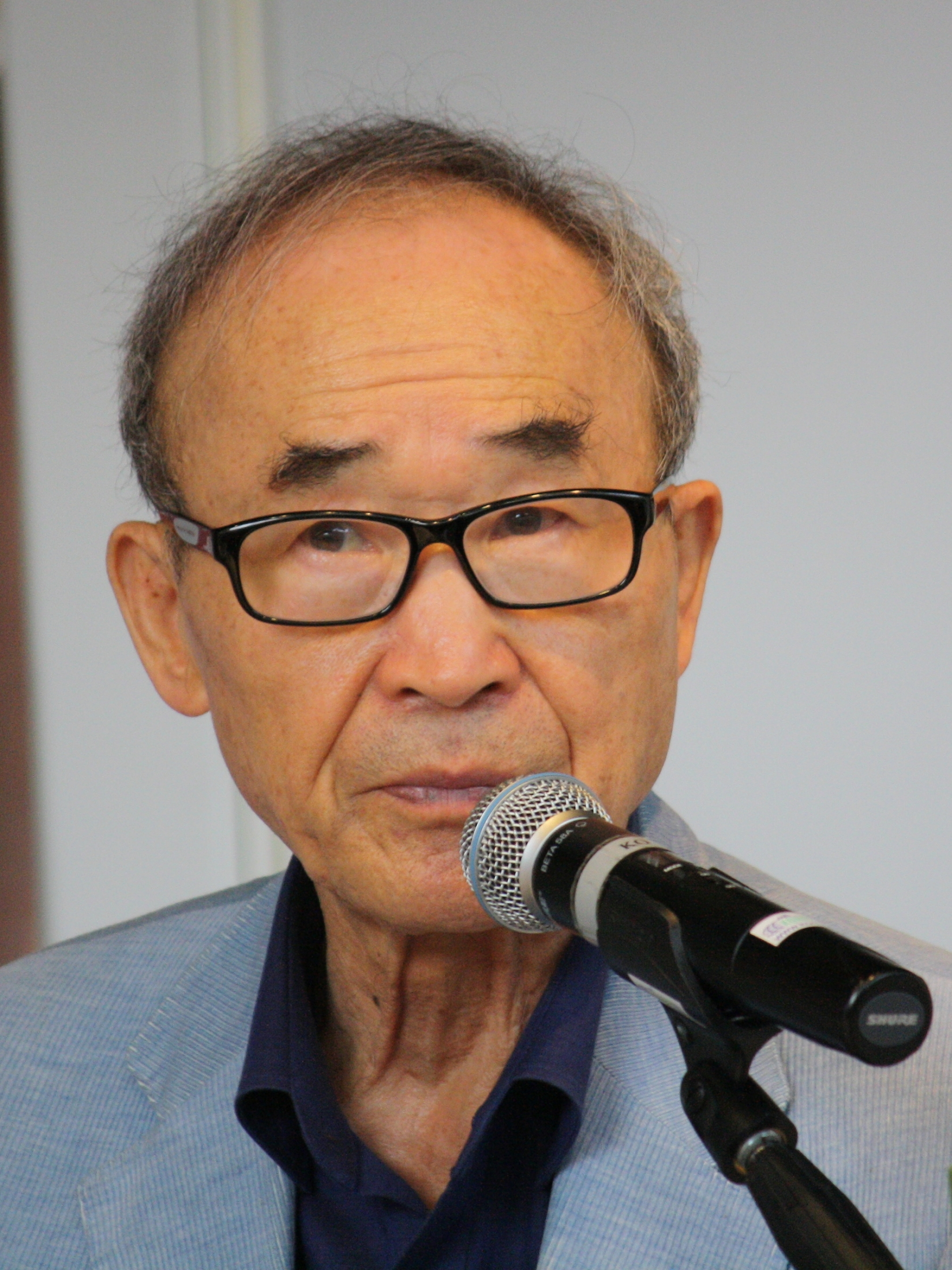
Go Eun

In 2017, "Hwanghae Culture" 97 and "Hwanghae Culture" were planned as feminism for specials, creative works, cultural criticism, and photo essays. When asked by poet Choi Young-mi to do so, she actually referred to poet Ko Un and wrote about the poem "Monster" that exposes sexual violence in the paragraph, sparking the MeToo movement.

On February 7, 2018, Choi Young-mi appeared in the JTBC newsroom after the controversy and said, "It was a bit exaggerated," but she was "a follow-up" to the character in the poem. On top of that, she further revealed, "When I was in my early 30s, there were dozens of people who sexually harassed and molested me at a drinking party, not just one or two."

People such as Lee Seung-chul posted messages criticizing poet Choi Young-mi in an original way, such as Choi Young-mi's costume play, sparking controversy over her "second assault."

"One day between 1993 and 1995, I will talk about the monster's sexual violence at the year-end party," poet Choi said in her Facebook post on the 17th. "There is another worst case of a monster I witnessed at a bar in Jongro around 1993, but I can't say it because I'm afraid my mouth will get dirty."

Poet Ko Un stepped down as chair professor on Saturday, saying, "I don't want to cause trouble to Dankook University because of me." In addition, poet Ko Un reportedly expressed his position to leave the residential creative space at the foot of Gwanggyosan Mountain provided by Suwon City. As of Tuesday, Dankook University dropped articles and posts related to poet Ko Un on its website.

The Seoul Metropolitan Government has decided to shut down the "Everyone's Room" to commemorate him.

==== Others ====
A woman who identified herself as a victim of sexual violence in the paragraph issued a statement in front of the Mapo Central Library in Mapo-gu, Seoul, where the general meeting of the Korean Writers' Association will be held, urging the Korean Writers' Association, which includes a large number of sexual offenders in the paragraph, to prepare countermeasures.

=== Cinema ===
On February 8, a rookie actress filed a claim on SNS that she had been sexually harassed by film director Cho Geun-hyun during a casting interview for a music video actor on 18 December 2017. The film production company excluded the director from its promotional activities. The victim submitted the transcript as evidence at the time of the interview.

On the 17th, local time, director Kim Ki-duk attended the Berlin International Film Festival and mentioned the assault on his actress.

On Sunday, a Twitter user disclosed sex crimes on his account, referring to the real name of a film producer and a film professor at a university.

On March 6, former employees exposed the habitual sexual assault of the secretary general of the Jeonju International Film Festival.

==== Lee Hyun Joo ====
Film director A also revealed the sex crimes committed by film director Lee Hyun-joo on social media under the title of "Writing to Join Me Too Campaign." Lee Hyun-joo was indicted in 2015 on charges of committing sex crimes against a female colleague of the Academy of Motion Picture Arts and was sentenced to two years in prison, suspended for three years, and 40 hours of sexual violence education by the Supreme Court last December. A reported the damage and claimed that there was an attempt to cover up the incident in the film industry.

On February 5, the Women's Film Council held a board meeting and stripped Lee of the director award he gave at the Women's Film Awards at the end of last year. The Women's Film Council said, "We only learned about Lee Hyun-joo's case through a tip-off on February 2 and called the board of directors," adding, "We decided to cancel the award because it clearly violated the purpose of the establishment." The Korean Film Directors' Association also expelled Lee Hyun-joo on February 6.

==== Cho Min Ki ====
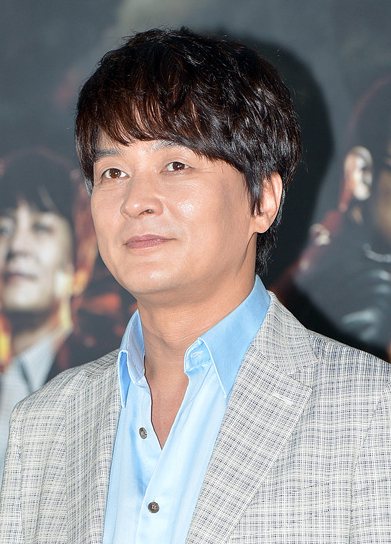
Cho Min Ki

At dawn on February 20, an article titled 'I'm suing you' was posted at the DC Inside Theater and Musical Gallery. "A professor of theater at a university in Cheongju sexually harassed female students for years," the anonymous post-writer said. This post is currently deleted.

In October 2017, the victim reported Cho Min-ki's sexual harassment to the Kookmin Ilbo. Cheongju University, which received a complaint from the Ministry of Education, held a gender equality committee to investigate the case. Cheongju University held a meeting of its board of directors in December and a disciplinary review of Cho Min-ki, a former theater professor, was approved. The school said, "The investigation confirmed it to be true. We demanded stern disciplinary action because it constitutes sexual harassment under regulations and the victim wanted to be punished strongly," he said. Cheongju University issued a three-month suspension and Cho Min-ki submitted his resignation.

Cho Min-ki's side flatly denied the allegation. Cho Min-ki also appeared on JTBC's newsroom and denied the allegations. The agency, Will Entertainment, made an official statement on the 20th, saying, "The content of sexual molestation is a clear rumor and the severe punishment for sexual harassment is also not true."

Meanwhile, new actor Song Ha-neul testified specifically to Cho Min-ki's sexual harassment on SNS. He stressed that it was not a "rumor circulating without victims" mentioned by Cho Min-ki or a "fabricated affair by conspiracy of unspecified forces."

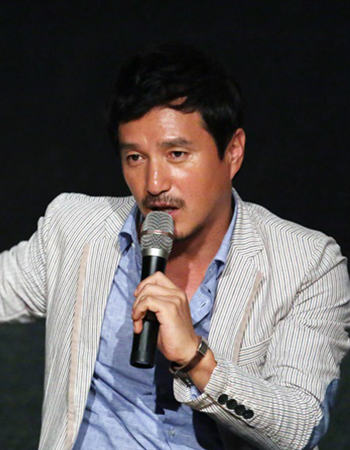
Cho Jae Hyun

On March 9, Cho Min-ki was finally found dead at his home. Circumstances suggest suicide. In the end, the North Chungcheong Provincial Police Agency ended its investigation with no right to indict.

==== Cho Jae Hyun ====
On February 23, 2018, actor Choi Yul pointed to Cho Jae-hyun as an actor who caused a controversy over sexual harassment. On the 24th, Cho apologized for his wrongdoing through a statement and dropped out of tvN's drama Cross. But not long after the apology was issued, another victim's disclosure came out.

==== Kim Young Bin ====
In October 2013, the former programmer A was forcibly molested at the office of the organizing committee of the Bucheon International Film Festival, and five years later, on March 21, 2018, he was exposed and charged with the MeToo movement. It was sent to the prosecution on April 3, 2018.

==== Cho Hyun Hoon ====
On April 27, 2018, news of the sexual harassment of a female director at the 2013 film festival came out, and he apologized to the victim and said he would stop his activities.

=== Theater ===
On February 11, theater actor Lee Myung-haeng issued an apology on his agency's official Facebook page over a controversy over past sexual harassment and dropped out of the play "The Kiss of a Spider Woman."

Director Hwang Yi-sun wrote, "The theater master, who runs a troupe of professors from Seoul National University of Arts, raised his hand on his thigh in 2003 to cover his knee blanket in a car on his way from school to Namsan, and gradually approached the important part."

An anonymous publisher, who introduced himself as a friend of a musician working for a large musical orchestra team, posted a revelation about renowned music director Byun Hee-seok on a bulletin board on a well-known Internet site. Regarding Byun Hee-seok, the publisher said, "Even actors, musicians, and staff in the performing world don't want to work together. I'm writing down some examples of how dirty words he says, how hard-to-mouth lewd he is, and how many of the team members he had to listen to every performance he spits out," he said. When the article was posted, some people who knew Byun Hee-seok also agreed.

On February 19, an online community bulletin board posted an article saying that Byun Hee-seok, who directed music in large musicals "Titanic" and "Cyrano," made sexual harassment remarks to female members. On the same day, musical director Byun Hee-seok posted an apology on social media for his alleged sexual harassment.

On the 18th, actor H (35) also posted on Facebook, "I drank a lot in the back seat of the theater for the first time in Daehak-ro, and when I woke up, a senior was licking my ears in a motel room," adding, "He left the motel room for the last time to confess that he liked me, and then I walked the door and fell asleep.""He revealed a senior actor.

On the anonymous bulletin board of Seoul National University of Arts, he confessed that he joined a theater troupe in Gimhae at the age of 16 more than a decade ago and was sexually assaulted in a van by A. The Gyeongnam Theater Association announced on the 19th that it will permanently expel the head of the Gimhae troupe, "Bunjaki," which is a criminal in question. Then on Tuesday, another woman who borrowed the woman's name claimed that she had been sexually assaulted by A while living as a member of the same troupe. The Gyeongnam Provincial Police Agency's Women's and Youth Investigation Unit launched an investigation on women who revealed that they had been sexually assaulted by a representative of a theater company in Gimhae in the past. Two victims were identified by the police until Friday.

Since allegations of sexual assault by director Lee Yoon-taek were raised on February 15, various accusations have been filed online against the street gang of Yeonhui troupe. Among them, allegations were raised that actor Oh, who was a member of the Yeonhui troupe's street gang in the 1990s, sexually harassed female juniors. Starting this morning, some media outlets have named Oh Dal-soo by his real name.

==== Lee Yoon Taek ====
A figure who has accelerated the revelation of sexual harassment in the cultural community.

On February 14, playwright and director Lee Yoon-taek revealed the past sexual harassment committed by Kim Soo-hee, head of the theater company. In an article posted on his Facebook page with a hashtag called "MeToo," CEO Kim revealed the sexual harassment damage he suffered during a local performance more than a decade ago. CEO Kim said at the time that Lee Yoon-taek gave a female member a massage during practice or during breaks, calling her into the inn on the day of the incident. On the weekend, Kim Bo-ri (a pseudonym), who introduced herself as a former theatrical figure on Facebook, said that things like "washing naked with a wet towel," "similar sex when moving cars," and "gender and massage around them" that others exposed were things that she had experienced in the past.Another victim, who was a minor at the time of the original document archives, is said to have suffered similar incidents.

Eventually, Lee Yun-taek stopped working. Oh Kyu-seok, the governor of Gijang-gun, is also said to be in danger of a firestorm. He was expelled from the Korean Drama Association on the evening of the 17th and from the Seoul Theater Association on the 18th. We'd like to know what it is. There have been a series of requests on the bulletin board to cover the incident. On the same day, the Korean Drama Producers Association also decided to expel him. In addition, the Yeonhui Dangeori Troupe was disbanded on the 19th.

On the 19th, Lee Yoon-taek held a press conference on sexual harassment at 30 Studio in Myeongryun-dong, Jongno-gu, Seoul, and said, "I sincerely apologize to the victims. Embarrassed and miserable. We will accept any punishment, including legal responsibility," he said in a public apology. However, it is said that the apology was not sincere, denying allegations of sexual assault.

On the 21st, Oh Dong-sik posted on his Facebook page, "I accuse my teacher," revealing in detail the process of preparing for the press conference from the 12th to the 19th when the Me Too movement against Lee Yoon-taek began. He revealed that Lee Yun-taek ignored the facts as he prepared for the press conference and practiced the poor look. However, Oh Dong-sik himself once verbally abused and assaulted Won Seon-hye and other supporting actors.

On the 22nd, Hong Sun-joo posted a message on her Facebook page saying, "It's me who had a phone interview and a video interview with JTBC Newsroom Son Suk-hee," and shot Kim So-hee, the CEO of Yeonhui Street Troupe. Kim So-hee revealed that she pointed to a junior who would be subject to Lee Yoon-taek's sexual assault, adding that she was also a victim of sexual assault.

==== Ha Yong-bu ====
On the night of February 18, Kim Bo-ri (a pseudonym) at the DC Inside Theater and Musical Gallery claimed in her second article, "I was sexually assaulted in a tent near the theater by Hayongbu's Miryang Theater Village chief during the 'Milyang Summer Performing Arts Festival' in 2001."

The Cultural Heritage Administration said in an explanatory document on the 20th, "The payment of the subsidy for successor training, which had been paid to the holders of the national intangible cultural asset in connection with the recent alleged sexual assault of the human cultural asset Ha Yong-bu, which caused social controversy, will be suspended until the facts are confirmed."

In addition, Miryang City notified Miryang Theater Village, a division in Gasan-ri, Bubuk-myeon, downtown, of the termination of the free lease contract. According to the city government, the cancellation of the free lease contract was carried out under the contract for consignment and consignment of Miryang Theater Village.

=== Cartoonists ===
==== Park Jae Dong ====
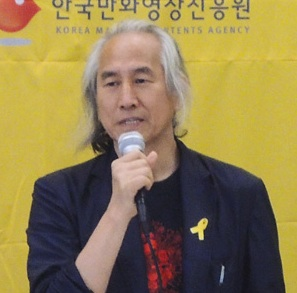
Park Jae-dong

According to a report by SBS's "8 News" on February 26, 2018, Park Jae-dong sexually harassed and molested a writer Lee who came to ask for a wedding officiant. The victim said in an interview, "I was sexually harassed while trying to ask for a wedding officiant," and stroked my thigh like this, saying, "Welcome." "I thought you looked delicious from the first time I saw you," he revealed, shocking me.

Since then, the author has announced the damage through the Korea Cartoonist Association's casebook of fair labor and sexual violence in 2016, in which he participated as an illustrator. Then the author, who claimed that Park Jae-dong called him and caused secondary damage by finding the source of the rumor, released a transcript of the call. In the transcript, Park said, "If this is a family, but if you wrote it in your case book, then you'll talk to him, talk to him, talk to him.

In an apology on Feb. 28, 2018, he said he apologized to the victim, author Lee Tae-kyung, for his wrongdoing.

On March 9, 2018, the Korea Cartoonist Association held a board meeting and unanimously expelled Park Jae-dong over the controversy over sexual violence under Article 9 of the articles of association.

=== Broadcasting ===
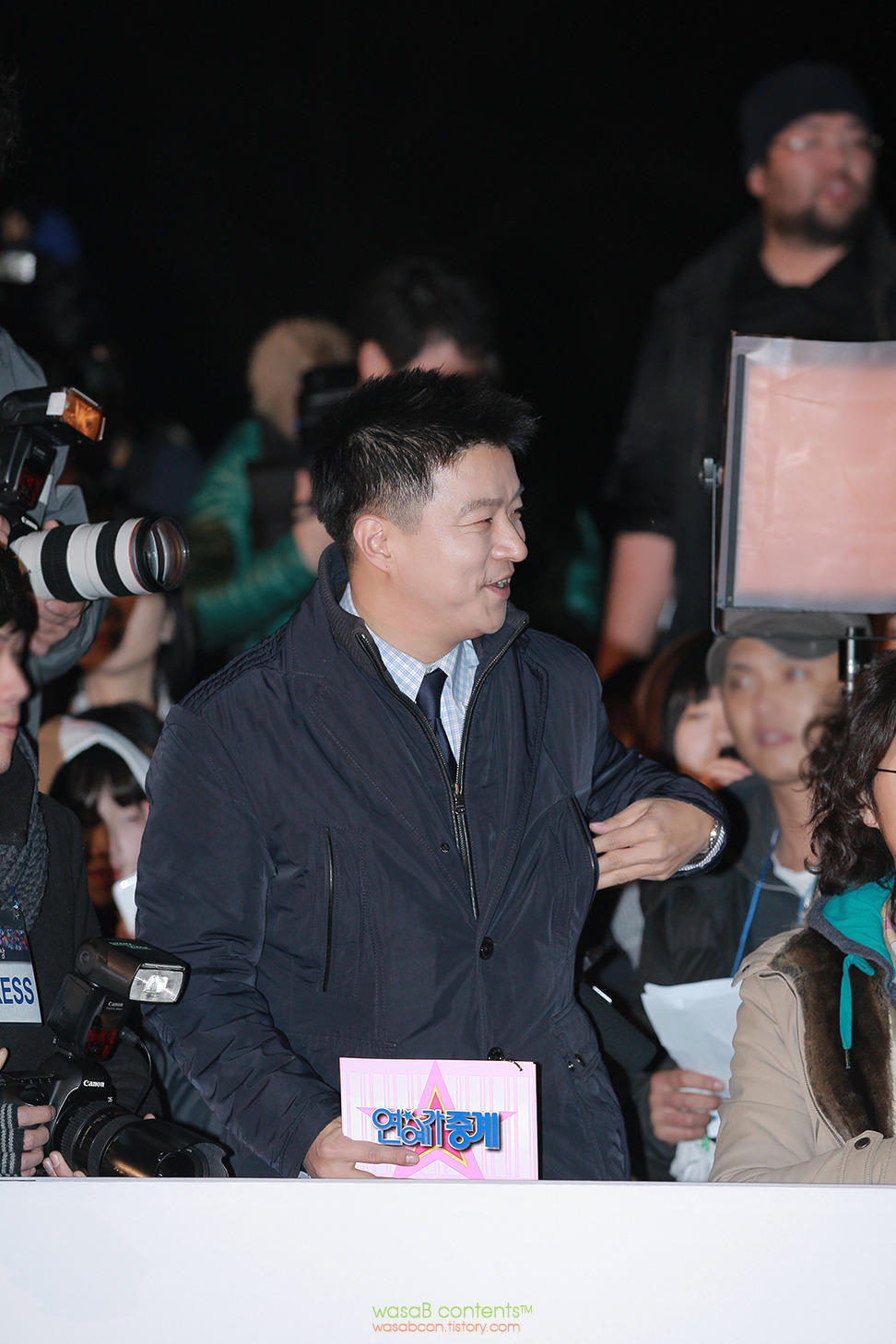
Kim Saeng Min

In 2018, Me Too 1 was prosecutor Seo Ji-hyun, but Korea's Me Too 1 was actor Jang Ja-yeon. The spread of the MeToo movement has led to growing public calls for a reinvestigation of Jang Ja-yeon, but the media has shown restraint in commenting on whether large media outlets are involved.

On February 22, a petition was posted on the bulletin board of Cheong Wa Dae's "National Petition and Proposal," titled "Please make the gag community join Me Too." "I understand that female comedians suffered a lot from sexual harassment," said a netizen who introduced herself as a rookie comedian who spent time at Daehangno XX Hall from 2008 to early 2009.

==== Kim Saeng-min ====
On April 2, 2018, he was exposed to sexual harassment by MeToo. Although Gra, who has been at his best since his debut, is in a state of shock, he has admitted and apologized, making it a fait accompli to leave the broadcasting industry.

=== Sports ===
==== Baduk ====
On April 11, 2018, female professional baduk players participated in the MeToo movement in the course of training related to sex crimes at the Korea Baduk Association. A number of allegations of sexual harassment and sexual assault by drivers have been raised, and illegal filming of women's restrooms has also been revealed. Although the real name was not directly mentioned in Sunday's article, the real name was mentioned through the Korea Baduk Association's internal computer network and Facebook's professional baduk players page, and the suspects admitted to the charges.

==== Kim Sung-ryong ====
On April 16, 2018, allegations were revealed through the Korea Baduk Association's internal computer network that Kim Sung-ryong sexually assaulted a foreign female Go player from the Korea Baduk Association. In the original article, Kim Sung-ryong's real name was disclosed, and when it was published on April 17, 2018, the name Kim Sung-ryong was Bokja. However, in an article in the Sunday Newspaper, he revealed that he was Kim Sung-ryong, who was just a copycat of his name by saying, "K ninth grader, a renowned professional commentator, a coach of the Korean Baduk League, and a public relations director of the Korea Baduk Association."

In response, the Korea Baduk Association decided to form an emergency ethics committee to conduct a fact-finding mission.

On April 19, 2018, fellow female reporters testified, and on April 21, 2018, about 50 female Go players issued a statement.

According to a game Go article, POSCO Chemtech fired Kim Sung-ryong as soon as the incident broke out.

Kim Sung-ryong was expelled from the association on April 24, 2018. If the article is passed by the board of directors of the Korea Baduk Association and the general meeting of the professional association, the expulsion of Kim Sung-ryong will be confirmed. The Korea Baduk Association dismissed Kim Sung-ryong as its public relations director.

==== Tennis ====
On January 16, 2019, on MBN News8, a former tennis player was sexually harassed by his coach, and the high school victim A confessed that he had been sexually harassed by his new coach for two years. In response, as the phone recording of the assailant B and victim A was released, the assailant B mentioned Shim Seok-hee, who revealed the sexual harassment scandal in the sports community in 2019, and asked the victim to forgive her.

=== Political field ===
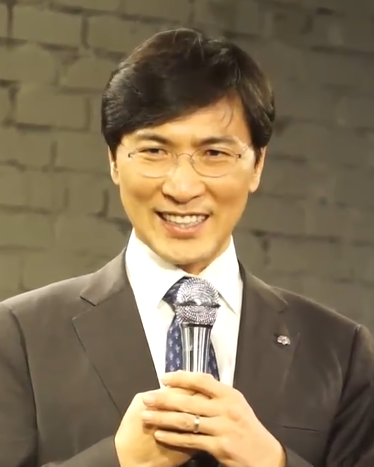
Ahn Hee Jung

==== Ahn Hee Jung ====
On March 5, 2018, South Chungcheong Province Governor Ahn Hee-jung's secretary revealed that he had been sexually assaulted by Ahn Hee-jung, and Ahn's side claimed that it was not true, but Ahn revealed that there was another victim who had been sexually assaulted by him, and when the sexual assault turned out to be true, the Democratic Party expelled Ahn Hee-jung and Ahn also resigned as governor.

In response, Ahn Hee-jung admitted to inappropriate sexual relations, but refuted the claim, saying, "It was a consensual sexual relationship," adding, "There was no strong pressure." Even if the sex crime controversy is not true, Ahn Hee-jung is a married man, and it is expected that he had an affair with his secretary.

Afterwards, the Democratic Party leadership quickly convened a supreme council meeting to go through the process of Ahn Hee-jung's expulsion, and the expulsion was confirmed on the 6th. With less than 100 days left before the local elections, the controversy is expected to be one of the obstacles to the ruling party's landslide victory in the local elections.

Ahn Hee-jung himself apologized at 12:50 a.m. on March 6, 2018. According to Ahn Hee-jung's official Facebook apology, "The secretary's position that the relationship was consensual is wrong," admitting that Kim Ji-eun's claim was correct, and declaring that she would not only quit her post as governor but also stop all political activities.

==== Min Byung Doo ====
On March 10, 2018, a revelation came out that Min Byung-doo of the Democratic Party of Korea had been sexually harassed.The female victim of the video source claimed that Min Byung-doo pushed the table at the karaoke room to block the entrance and that Gap-ja kissed her. Rep. Min Byung-doo said, "I admit that the two went to karaoke together and had physical contact, but I don't remember how good it was." Eventually, he decided to resign from his parliamentary seat over allegations of sexual harassment. Mrs. Lee also agreed to resign.

However, the Democratic Party of Korea has refused to accept the resignation because if Min Byung-doo resigns, the number of seats will be only four digits apart from the Liberty Korea Party.

In addition to the aftermath of the MeToo movement by politicians following former South Chungcheong Province Gov. An Hee-jung, the main opposition Democratic Party has refrained from making official comments, saying it is very shocking and has nothing to say. Meanwhile, Min Byung-doo's wife posted a Facebook post saying she would forgive him, which is also being talked about.

==== Others ====
On January 30, Democratic Party lawmaker Lee Jae-joung revealed on SNS that he had been sexually harassed by the head of a law firm, a former prosecutor, when he was preparing to get a job as a lawyer in 2005. There is an allegation that Rep. Lee Jae-joung, while serving as a lawyer, actually urged a junior female lawyer who was sexually harassed to cover up the damage, saying, "Make a wise choice."

On Jan. 31, Lee Hyo-kyung, a member of the Gyeonggi Provincial Council of the Democratic Party of Korea, also revealed sexual harassment on her Facebook page. He revealed what he called him to a karaoke room at 10 p.m., that he called him "I love you" in the early morning hours while intoxicated, and sarcastically saying why his butt is so big. "A fellow male lawmaker once took off his pants in front of him six years ago at a dinner party for his standing committee," he said at the time. "I had a lot of cursing all night long."

Choi Yoon-hee, a former lawmaker of the Grand National Party and North Gyeongsang Province, also confessed the sexual harassment damage on Facebook. When he was serving as a provincial assemblyman, he revealed that his fellow lawmakers openly touched his chest and buttocks. Han also revealed that he asked Choi, a proportional representative, openly, "Will you be able to sleep with me if I give him a nomination?"

Former supreme council member Ryu Yeo-hae of the Liberty Korea Party also joined the Me Too movement. She appeared in front of a women's group protesting in front of the prosecution. Women's activists reacted reluctantly to the participation of politicians, but Ryu Yeo-hae accepted it because she insisted, "I'm not a politician anymore." "Hong Joon-pyo for sustained has been sexually molested." he insisted. is ryuyeoae At a national convention held at Gyeongsan Gymnasium in North Gyeongsang Province in June last year, Hong also claims to have held his hand and insulted himself with words such as "the owner of the tavern" and "a psychopath-like person." 100 million compensation against the 3 p.m. on February 5, Hong Joon-pyo, filed a lawsuit.

Chung Ae-hyang and Suseong-gu also joined the MeToo movement under their real names. He revealed that he had been sexually harassed while training for Suseong-gu on Jeju Island on Sept. 19 last year. On the bus returning to the hotel at around 8 p.m. after dinner, a drunken fellow district councilor pushed Chung toward the window and attempted physical contact. On top of that, he said he made sexually harassing remarks such as "Let's take a look at his body" and tried to enter Chung's room.

=== Religion ===
==== Catholicism ====
At dawn on February 15, Kim Min-kyung (Sophia), a Catholic believer, sent to the KBS special reporting team the fact that she was nearly sexually assaulted several times by a priest in South Sudan during her missionary work in South Sudan in 2011 with Father Han Man-sam of the Catholic Diocese of Suwon and the Priests of Justice, and was revealed on the 23rd. The Suwon Diocese suspended priest Han Man-sam's execution of the church, and Archbishop Kim Hee-joong, the chairman of the Catholic Bishops' Conference of Korea, made a public apology.

In 2016, the choir conductor of Myeong-dong Cathedral was protested for sexually disparaging remarks such as, "These days, bar women are more elegant than ordinary women," but the speaker remained the same and the female members who raised the issue had to leave the choir without any action. After being forgotten about the article, it began to draw attention again when the MeToo movement came out in 2018.

In the early 2000s, it was revealed that Father John, a baptist of the Daejeon Diocese who served as a teacher at the Catholic Mission School, sexually harassed a minor student. Father Jang In-guk served as principal of Nonsan Daegun High School and Daechul Middle School, and recently served as president of Daejeon Catholic Peace Broadcasting Corporation before being suspended after MeToo accusation. In a swift response after a quick fact-finding mission, the Daejon Diocese responded with a formal apology through Bishop Yu Heung-sik Lazaro. This case, along with others, underscored the urgent need for institutional reform.

==== Protestantism ====
The incident in which a seminary student committed suicide after revealing the sexual assault of a pastor in a suicide note.

According to the victim's suicide note, she has been taking medication for severe depression for three years. Kang has sexually assaulted me beyond count. "I'm just a minor who can't do anything because I've only shown myself to love my family as a victim," he said. It is a revelation that the pastor sexually assaulted a minor. One of the pastors in charge even met with a reporter in person and said, "At that time, Kang confessed to himself that he had an inappropriate relationship with Su-yeon, and at that time, he said he would not do ministry work in the future, so he ended his resignation." In the end, the pastor took a year off and resumed his ministry activities.

A woman in her 50s, who was a member of the Suwon S Church in Gyeonggi Province, revealed in a telephone interview with the Hankook Ilbo that she had been sexually assaulted by a 74-year-old pastor about 10 years ago. Regarding A's claim, Pastor Lee refuted the allegations, saying that he was the victim, saying, "I was tempted by A and met him only twice, but it was a mistake," adding, "I was distressed and scared by the pastor's conscience, so I hung up after that."

On March 6, JTBC Newsroom quoted a report on sexual violence conducted by the Seoul Sungrak Church Reform Council's legal team and reported that six out of 100 believers of the Seoul Sungrak Church suffered sexual violence within the church, and Rev. Kim Ki-dong was at the center of it. Victims began to engage in real-name Me Too after the second round of damage to the faithful, who confessed to the article, continued to be driven to the flower snake.

=== Education ===
==== Teachers at M Girls' Middle School in Seoul ====
On March 6, 2018, a graduate of M Girls' Middle School in Seoul, revealed through her Facebook page that eight years ago, she was continuously victimized by Oh, a teacher at the same school when she was a freshman at M Girls' Middle School. After the assault, A, who forced her to "lock her cell phone well" and "don't tell anyone," and refused to meet under the pretext of going to an academy, even urged her to meet, saying, "Let's see for five minutes," and sexually harassed her as well as her own brother from time to time. A's nightmare seemed to end with her middle school graduation, but after entering high school and becoming an adult, she continued to try to contact her through text messages, Kakao Talk, and Facebook messages despite her disregard.

Following A's revelation, numerous graduates of M Girls' Middle School said from Oh, "Women should wear white underwear. I heard sexual harassment remarks such as "The first night is ecstatic," and have testified that Oh was also a teacher who used physical punishment as an assault. Following the revelations, Oh eventually offered his apology to A, but when A asked him to turn himself in, he appointed a lawyer.

Maeil Economy on March 9 and Yonhap News Agency on March 11 reported the fact, and the principal of M Girls' Middle School is said to have suspended Oh from work.

On March 10, the father of the victim, A, posted a message on his Facebook page. corresponding post

On March 13, Maeil Business Administration further revealed that there were two more teachers of sexual violence in M Girls' Middle School in addition to the teacher Oh, and that M Girls' Middle School had been covering it up even though they knew about it. Ahn, a part-time teacher at the same school, was dismissed in 2017 after he was found to have had sexual relations with student B of the school, whose homeroom teacher was none other than Oh, the subject of the above sexual violence Me Too. Oh called in the victim, B, and asked her to elaborate on the damage, and when B confessed, she urged B to cover up the incident, such as "people can make mistakes in their lives," and continued to stress to other students who found out about the fact, "We did it because we liked each other."

The school did not notify the education office even though it was aware of the damage caused by the teacher, identified only by her surname Wi, and did not recognize the secondary abuse of the teacher, identified by her surname Oh. Meanwhile, another teacher at M Girls' Middle School, identified only by her surname Park, has been under investigation since she was dismissed in 2017 for sexually harassing a student. The Seoul Metropolitan Office of Education launched a special audit of M Girls' Middle School on March 12.

==== Teachers of Hankwang Girls' Middle School/ Girls' High School in Pyeongtaek ====
On March 17, Me-too exposure to school trees and some teachers broke out on the girls' middle school side. There were a number of cases of damage through Twitter and Facebook, and there were posts on the school's Facebook page that said, "We will deal with it according to principles, please refrain from expressing opinions through SNS," but there was a backlash saying, "What are the principles and why are you trying to restrict opinions through SNS?"

During the service on March 19, the principal apologized and conducted a survey with a girls' high school. The above Facebook page also reported the current progress, and teachers under suspicion have been removed from their duties. And it was reported to various media including terrestrial broadcasting. According to the article, the girls' high school is also suspected, with as many as 11 teachers in total being suspected.

==== Suncheon Cheongam University ====
Two female professors at Soonchun Cheongam University filed complaints through Internet networks and statements, saying, "The prosecution and the court have been trying to cover up the university president's sexual harassment." The National Council of Professors for Democratization, Gwangju Jeonnam Professors' Association, National Women's Association, and National Association of Disappointed Professors demanded the reinstatement of two female professors who were dismissed after suing the sexual harassment of former President Kang Myung-woon (71, arrested) in front of the Suncheon branch of the Gwangju District Prosecutors' Office on Feb. 12.

== See also ==
- Gender inequality in South Korea
- Women in South Korea
