= Gary Gach =

American poet

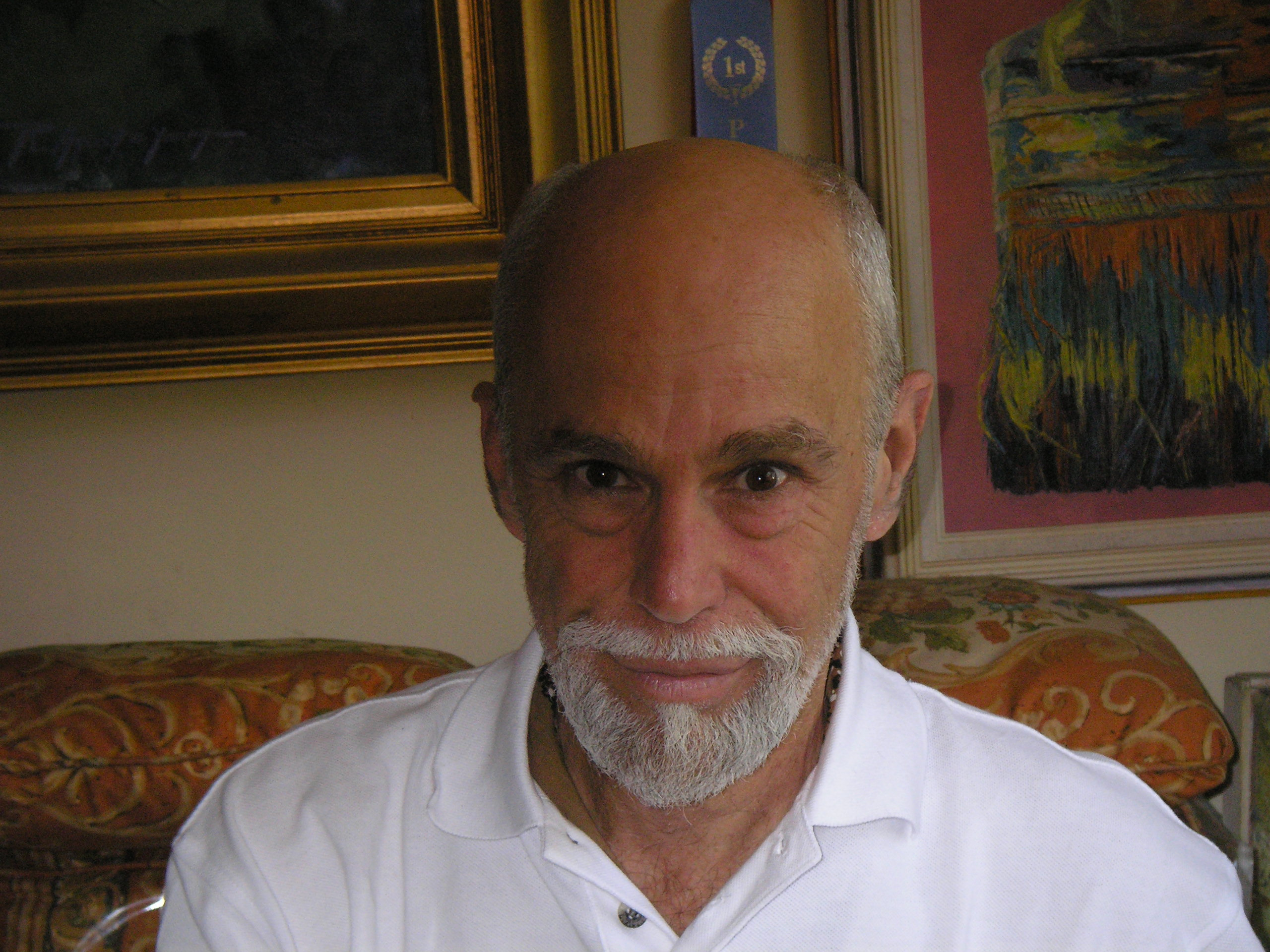
- Born: November 30, 1947 (age 78); Hollywood, California, USA
- Occupations: Writer; translator; editor; teacher

Gary Gregory Gach (born 1947) is an American author, translator, editor, and teacher living in San Francisco. His work has been translated into several languages, and has appeared in several anthologies and numerous periodicals. He has hosted Zen Mindfulness Fellowship weekly for 12 years, and he swims in the San Francisco Bay. His work has appeared in The Atlantic, BuddhaDharma, Coyote’s Journal, Harvard Divinity Bulletin, Hambone, In These Times, Lilipoh, Mānoa, The Nation, The New Yorker, Words without Borders, Yoga Journal, and Zyzzyva.

== Life ==
Gach was born in a Jewish American family in Hollywood, Los Angeles in 1947. He was student body president of John Burroughs Junior High School. He claims to have had a mystic vision as a young boy. At 11, he read The Way of Zen by Alan Watts, beginning a lifelong interest in Buddhism.

He was formally introduced to meditation by Paul Reps and later studied Hasidic Judaism and Kabbalah, and was introduced to shikantaza by Dainin Katagiri Roshi, then Suzuki Roshi. Alan Watts befriended and encouraged. He took transmission in the Plum Village Tradition, and is lay ordained in its core community the Order of Interbeing/

He has worked as an actor, stevedore, typographer, legal secretary, editor-in-chief, webmaster, and teacher. He currently teaches Zen Buddhism at University of San Francisco where he also hosts the weekly Zen Mindfulness Fellowship.

== Bibliography ==
=== Author ===
- 1974: Preparing the Ground : Poems 1960-1970 (Heirs, International; San Francisco)
- 1996: The Pocket Guide to the Internet: No-Sweat Guide to the Information Highway (Pocket Books; New York) ISBN 0-671-56850-7
- 1997: Writers.net: Every Writer's Essential Guide to Online Resources and Opportunities (Prima Publishing; Rocklin, New York) ISBN 0-7615-0641-1
- 2001–2009: Complete Idiot's Guide to Understanding Buddhism (Alpha Books, New York) ISBN 0-02-864170-1; 3rd edition, 2009 - ISBN 978-1592579112; 3rd edition, 2009 - ISBN 1592579116.
- 2018: Pause Breathe Smile – Awakening Mindfulness When Meditation Is Not Enough (Sounds True, Colorado) ISBN 1683641752

=== Translator ===
- 2005: (Co-translator with Brother Anthony (Taizé Community) and Kim Young-moo) Ten Thousand Lives by Ko Un, introduction by Robert Hass, (Green Integer: Los Angeles) ISBN 1-933382-06-6
- 2006: (Co-translator with Brother Anthony and Kim Young-moo) Flowers of a Moment, 185 brief poems by Ko Un; (BOA Editions, Ltd.: Rochester, New York) ISBN 1-929918-88-7
- 2007: (Co-translator with Brother Anthony Of Taizé and Kim Young-moo) Songs for Tomorrow: Poems 1961-2001 by Ko Un (Green Integer: Los Angeles) ISBN 978-1-933382-70-8
- 2023: (Co-translator with Erfan Mojib) Hafiz's Little Book of Life – Gardens of the World, Wine, Wisdom, & Ecstasy (Hampton Roads | Red Wheel / Weiser: Newburyport MA) ISBN 978-1642970463

== Editor ==
- 1998: What Book!? : Buddha Poems from Beat to Hiphop, introduction by Peter Coyote (Parallax Press; Albany, California) ISBN 0-938077-92-9 (American Book Award)

== Awards ==
Gach is a recipient of an American Book Award (from the Before Columbus Foundation) in 1999 for What Book!? Shortlisted for Northern California Book Award for Translation, for Songs for Tomorrow and finalist for Flowers of a Moment (Lannan Translations Selection). Nautilus Book Awards for Complete Idiot's Guide to Buddhism 3rd ed'n.
