= Little Pilgrim =

Novel by Ko Un

- Author: Ko Un
- Original title: 화엄경
- Translator: Kim Young-moo; An Sonjae
- Language: Korean
- Publisher: Parallax Press
- Publication date: 1969-91 (in Korean)
- Publication place: South Korea
- English publication date: 2005
- Pages: 400
- ISBN: 978-1888375435

Little Pilgrim (Korean: 화엄경) is a novel by the South Korean writer Ko Un. It is based on the character Sudhana from the Avatamsaka Sutra, and the narrative consists of 53 encounters between the boy and various teachers. Ko began to have the chapters published in 1969, and the finished work was first published in book form in 1991. It was published in English in 2005.

== Style ==
Although the subtitle of the book is "A Novel," critics have noted that is slightly inaccurate. Although the work is fiction, it is not a novel in the sense of having narrativity or coherence. Instead it is a presentation of unrelated interesting material which are linked by an "underlying philosophy of interconnectedness."

== Reception ==
The book was reviewed in Publishers Weekly in 2005: "The prose—translated from the Korean by An Sonjae and Young-Moo Kim—varies, with some beautiful descriptions ('The sunlight poured down, turning the innumerable crests of the indigo waves into flashing blades and splintered mirrors') and some improbable ones ('The fleshy bulge on the crown of his head was like nothing so much as an altar-covering'). ... Despite the author's impressive credentials, though, this may be a difficult story for all but the most ardent Buddhist readers."

== See also ==
- South Korean literature
