= Erfan Mojib =

Iranian author-translator

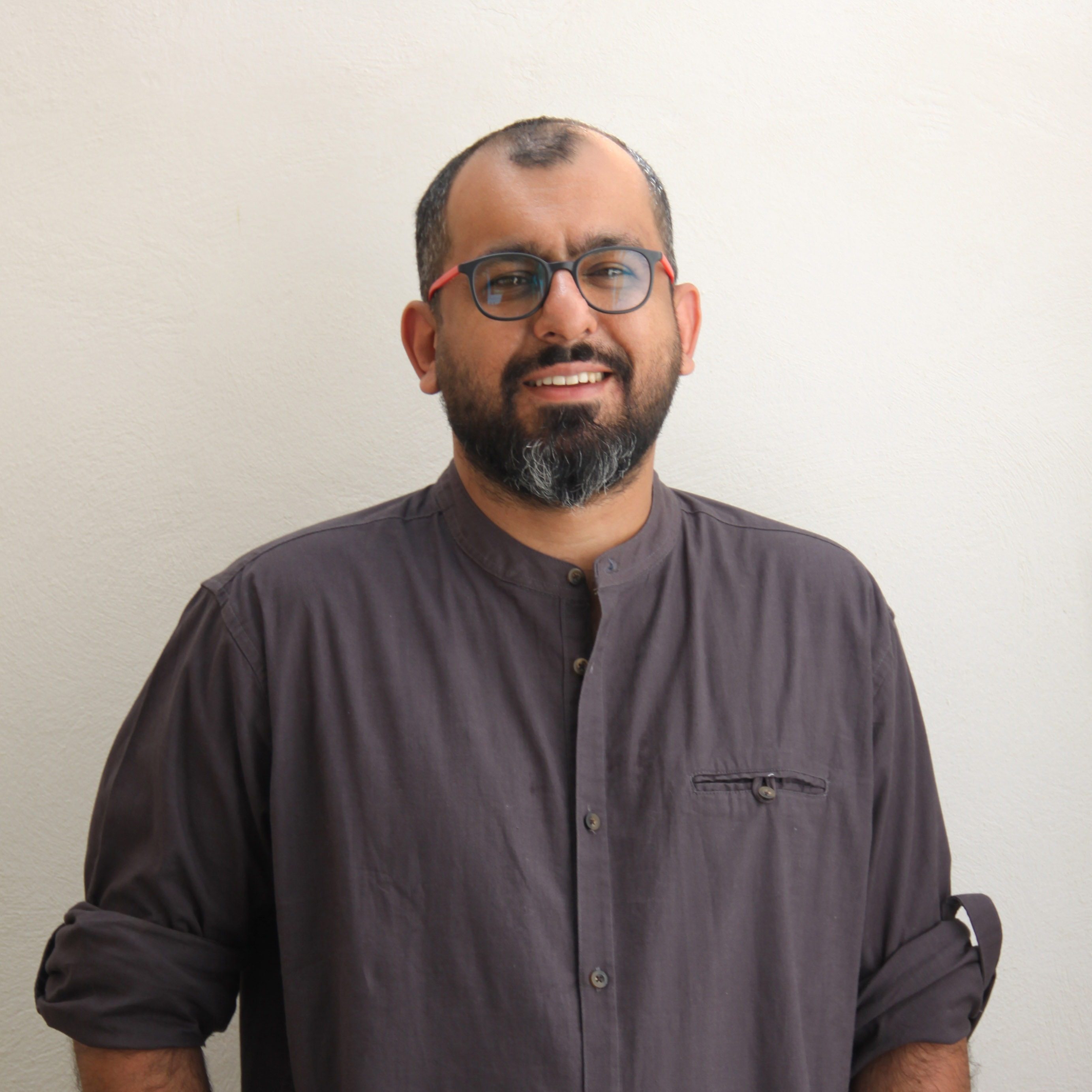
Erfan Mojib

Erfan Mojib is an Iranian writer and translator born on 12 May 1984 in Yazd, Iran. He holds a degree in Comparative Literature from UM Malaysia and an MFA in Creative Writing from the University of New Brunswick, Canada. He has published several translated works of fiction including Reza Ghassemi's The Spell Chanted by Lambs and a selection of poems by Hafez entitled Hafiz's Little Book of Life (co-translated with Gary Gach).

His short stories and translations have appeared in numerous journals including the Academy of American Poets' Poem A Day, World Literature Today, Asymptote Journal, Jacket2, Konch and Kosmos. He is the recipient of David Walker Prize for Creative Writing.

== Bibliography ==
- 2024: Translation of Rodrigo García, A Farewell to Gabo and Mercedes (Saless)
- 2023: (Co-translator with Gary Gach) Hafiz's Little Book of Life – Gardens of the World, Wine, Wisdom, & Ecstasy (Hampton Roads | Red Wheel / Weiser: Newburyport MA) ISBN 978-1642970463
- 2020: Translation of Jeanette Winterson, The Passion (Borj)
- 2019: Translation of Julian Barnes, Flaubert’s Parrot (Cheshmeh)
- 2017: Translation of Gene Bell-Villada, García Márquez: The Man and His Work (Hirmand)
- 2015: Translation of Simon Van Booy, The Illusions of Separateness (Hirmand)
- 2014: Translation of Simon Van Booy, Love Begins in Winter (Hirmand)
- 2013: The Spell Chanted by Lambs (Candle & Fog) ISBN 978-964-2667-73-4
