= Choe Yeongmi =

South Korean poet and novelist (born 1961)

- 최영미
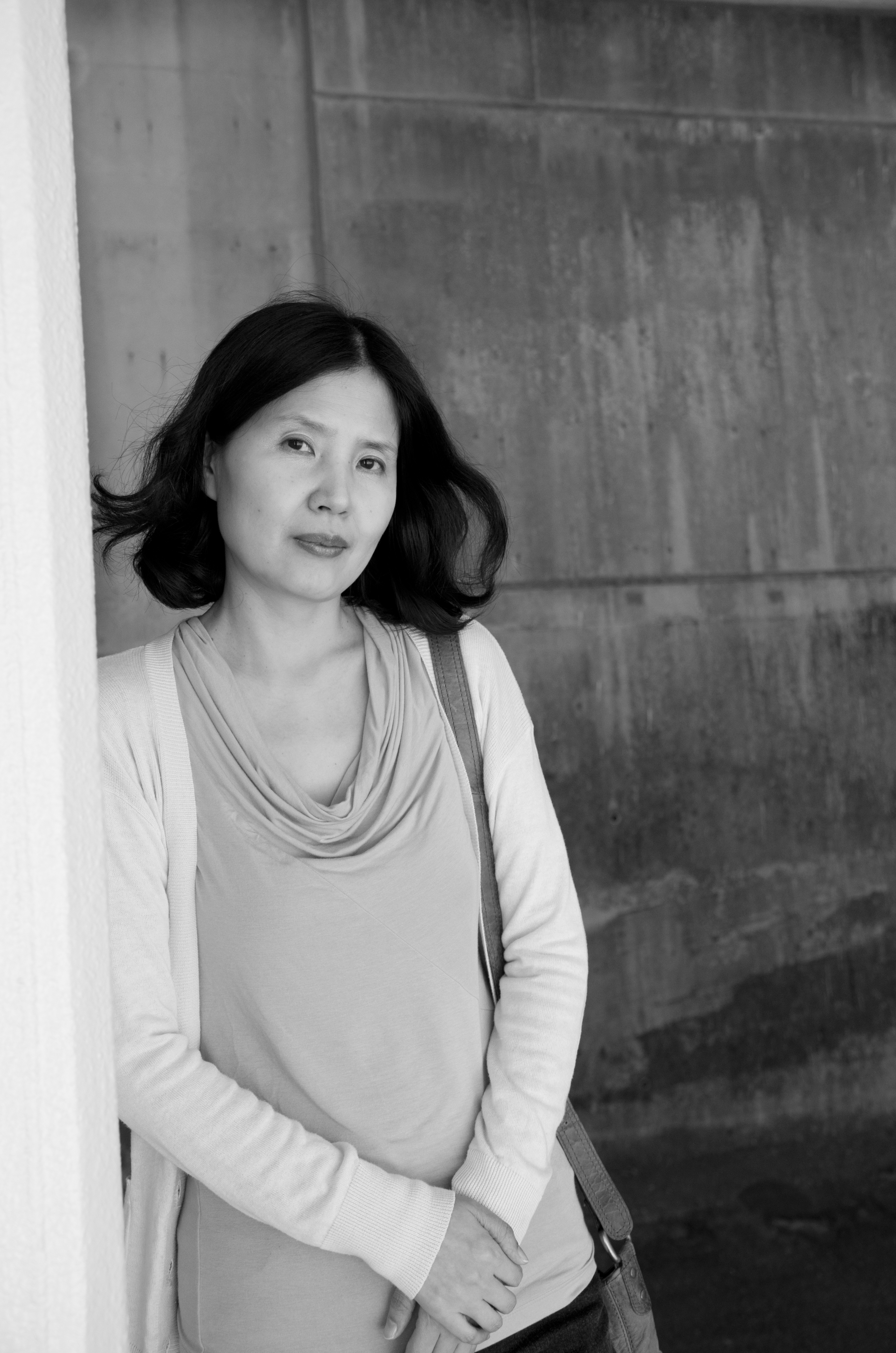
- Choe Yeongmi
- Born: September 25, 1961 (age 65); Seoul, South Korea
- Occupations: Poet and novelist

Korean name
- Hangul: 최영미
- Hanja: 崔泳美
- RR: Choe Yeongmi
- MR: Ch'oe Yŏngmi

Choe Yeongmi (Korean: 최영미; born September 25, 1961) is a South Korean poet and novelist and one of the figureheads of the MeToo movement in Korea, most widely recognized for her poetry collection At Thirty, the Party Is Over (1994).

== Biography ==
Born in Seoul, South Korea in 1961, Choe Yeongmi studied Western history (BA) at Seoul National University and art history (MA) at Hongik University. Faced with the military dictatorship, she participated in anti-government protests during college days. In 1981 she participated in a student protest demanding for democracy, and was detained for ten days and suspended from university for a year as a result. Choe was one of a secretive group of dissidents who translated Karl Marx's Kapital into Korean after the Korean War; this translation was published under a single pseudonym in 1987, and led to the arrest of the president of Yiron Kwa Silcheon Books. Following the decline of communism in the late 1980s and subsequent political changes at home and abroad, however, her political perspective changed to be a more inclusive worldview, which was reflected in her poetry. After she graduated, Choe joined an underground organisation called the Constituent Assembly Group (제헌의회그룹), established to fight against the autocracy.

== Career ==
Choe Yeongmi's literary career began in 1992 when she published eight poems, including "In Sokcho" (속초에서), in the winter issue of the magazineCreation and Criticism. Two years later, she published her first poetry collection, At Thirty, the Party Is Over (서른, 잔치는 끝났다, 1994), which was immediately controversial and immensely popular, with record sales of over half a million copies in its first year of publication alone. The book, which combined satire of society and culture with lyrical descriptions of everyday life in the 1980s and 90s in Korea, has since been reissued in 52 printings, with a revised 21st anniversary edition most recently published in 2015. She has published five more collections of poetry, Treading on the Pedals of Dreams (꿈의 페달을 밟고, 1998), To the Pigs (돼지들에게, 2005), Life That Has Yet To Arrive (도착하지 않은 삶, 2009), Things Already Hot (이미 뜨거운 것들, 2013), and What Will Not Come Again (다시 오지 않는 것들, 2019).

In 2006 Choe received the Isu Literary Award (이수문학상) for To the Pigs (2005). In 2011 she was appointed as an honorary ambassador for the Korean National Assembly Library. Things Already Hot (2013) was selected as the Book Culture Foundation's Literary Book of Excellence in 2013. Choe's poem "At Sun-un Temple" (선운사에서) was set to music and has been performed by various musicians. She gained national recognition with the publication of her poem "Monster" (괴물) in 2017.

=== "Monster" and #MeToo movement ===
Choe Yeongmi is considered the founder of the MeToo movement in Korea. In 2017 she was contacted by a magazine editor asking her to submit a poem about feminism; Choe's resulting poem, "Monster" (괴물), described her experiences being sexually harassed by a well-respected older male poet described only as "En." It was quickly revealed that the perpetrator in question was the highly revered Korean poet Ko Un, leading to a national outcry and reigniting the conversation around sexual harassment in literary spaces. Choe was honored with the Seoul Gender Equality Award in 2018 as a result of her speaking up about her experiences, described as a "brave account of the poet's experience of sexual harassment".

In 2018 Ko Un sued Choe Yeongmi for defamation, but lost the case, with the Seoul Central District Court ruling in favor of Choe in 2019 and describing her allegations as "credible" and her testimony as "consistent and specific", and saying there was "little reason to doubt the veracity of her claims". Ko appealed to the Seoul High Court, but also lost the appeal, with the damages suit he had filed against Choe being settled in her favor. Multiple other women in the Korean literary scene have since spoken up about their own experiences with Ko Un's predatory behavior, which Choe Yeongmi described as an "open secret". In 2023, Choe commented on Ko Un's unabated literary activity outside of Korea, posting on the social media site Facebook that it was "literature practicing hypocrisy" according to the Korea Herald.

== Works in Korean ==
=== Poetry collections ===
- At Thirty, the Party Is Over (서른, 잔치는 끝났다, 1994)
- Treading on the Pedals of Dreams (꿈의 페달을 밟고, 1998)
- To the Pigs (돼지들에게, 2005)
- Life That Has Yet To Arrive (도착하지 않은 삶, 2009)
- Things Already Hot (이미 뜨거운 것들, 2013)
- What Will Not Come Again (다시 오지 않는 것들, 2019)

=== Novels ===
- Scars and Patterns (흉터와 무늬, 2005)
- The Garden of Bronze (청동정원, 2014)

=== Essay collections ===
- Melancholy of the Ages: Choe Yeongmi's European Diary (시대의 우울: 최영미의 유럽일기)

=== Translations ===
- "Francis Bacon in Conversation with Michel Archimbaud" (in The Cruel Hand of a Painter: Conversations with Francis Bacon) (화가의 잔인한 손 : 프란시스 베이컨과의 대화, 1998)
- D'Aulaires' Book of Greek Myths (1999)

== Works in English ==
- in Three Poets of Modern Korea: Yi Sang, Hahm Dong-Seon and Choi Young-Mi (trans. James Kimbrell and Yu Jung-yul, 2002, Sarabande Books), shortlisted for the 2004 ALTA Prize
- in Against Healing: Nine Korean Poets (ed. Emily Jungmin Yoon, 2019, Tilted Axis Press)

== Reception ==
Several of Choe Yeongmi's poems have been included in high school textbooks, such as "In the Subway, II" (지하철에서 2), in Changbi Publishers' 2012 literature textbook; "Melancholy of the Ages - Cologne" (시대의 우울 – 쾰른 편), in Hakyeon Publishing's 2012 essay writing textbook; and "At Seon-un Temple" (선운사에서), in Jihak Publishing's 2014 literature textbook.

Many of her poems have been adapted into music. The album "Love Alone (혼자사랑) - Artpop & Classic" (1998), written by Lee Gunyong, director of the Seoul Metropolitan Opera, and sung by Jeon Kyungok, featured four songs with lyrics from Choe Yeongmi's poems: "At Seon-un Temple" (선운사에서), "Love Song for Adonis" (아도니스를 위한 연가), "Sad Café Song" (슬픈 카페의 노래), and "First Snow on Bukhansan" (북한산에 첫눈 오는 날). "At Seon-un Temple" was also rearranged by Kim Daesung to be included in his and Kang Kwonsoon's 2007 compilation, "First Feeling" (첫마음); the poem was also performed by An Chihwan on his 2010 album "Today Is Good" (오늘이 좋다).

== Personal life ==
Choe Yeongmi taught creative writing and poetry at Inha University in Incheon and Kangwon National University in Gangwon Province.

Several of Choe's essays about life, travel, and art have been published, including the collection Melancholy of the Ages: Choe Yeongmi's European Diary (시대의 우울: 최영미의 유럽일기), "To You Who Will Peek into My Diary by Chance" (우연히 내 일기를 엿보게 될 사람에게), and "Getting Lost Is a Real Trip" (길을 잃어야 진짜 여행이다). Choe is also a fan of football, and has published multiple essays about the sport, including an article about football in Korea in Die Tageszeitung's special issue in May 2006 for the 2006 FIFA World Cup, and "Ball Waits for No One" (공은 사람을 기다리지 않는다) in 2011. She also served as a board member of the Korea Football Association's Football Love Sharing Foundation from 2012 to 2013.

In 2019 Choe established her own publishing house, Imi Books (이미출판사), through which she published her collection What Will Not Come Again.
