= Kim Young-moo =

South Korean poet

- Born: 23 August 1944; Paju, South Korea
- Died: 26 November 2001 (aged 57)
- Writing career
- Language: Korean

Korean name
- Hangul: 김영무
- RR: Gim Yeongmu
- MR: Kim Yŏngmu

Kim Young-moo (Korean: 김영무; 1944 – 26 November 2001) was a South Korean poet, literary critic and translator born in Paju near Seoul.

== Life ==
Kim Young-moo did his BA and MA from Seoul National University, and then got his PhD from SUNY at Stony Brook in 1987. His dissertation was Between Social Liberation and Individual Liberation: Ambivalences in George Eliot's Moral and Social Thinking. He became a professor in the Department of English Language and Literature at his first alma mater in 1981. From early in 2001, he was bedridden, unable to walk on account of cancer. With his wife's devoted care, he was able to remain at home, writing, translating, and meeting friends, until the pain became too intolerable. He was taken to hospital on Tuesday, 20 November and died at 7:30 pm on Monday, 26 November 2001. Three days before he died, he wrote a final poem:

무지개

김영무

이 땅에 시인 하나 풀꽃으로 피어나 바람결에 놀다 갔다.

풀무치 새 울음소리 좋아하고 이웃 피붙이 같은 버들치 힘찬 지느러미 짓 더욱 좋아했다.

찬 이슬 색동보석 맺치는 풀섶세상—참 다정도 하다.

2001.11.23평촌 Rainbow Kim Young-Moo

In this land one poet blossomed—a wild flower, played in the wind, then went away.

He enjoyed the songs of crickets and birds, enjoyed even more the sturdy fin-strokes of minnows, neighborly, kin-like.

The world of wild greenery where cool drops of dew hang, many-hued jewels—it's so full of tenderness.

== Work ==
He published three volumes of his own poetry and worked with Brother Anthony as co-translator on a number of works including, The Sound of My Waves, Beyond Self, and The Thousand Lives (Maninbo). His first published article on Korean poetry, 이육사론 (창작과 비평, 1975년 여름호) signified his recognition as a literary critic. He published a number of translations from English: 침묵 속에 떠오르는 소리 (1977),블레이크 시선집 (1987, a volume of translations of poems by William Blake), 예수, 그 낯선분 (1989), 술례자 한느님 (1991, by Brother John of Taize) and more. He published a volume of personal essays 제비꽃에 너를 보며 (1988) and a volume of literary criticism 시의 언어와 삶의 언어 (1990), which received the prize for criticism in the 1991 Republic of Korea Literary Awards. He and Brother Anthony together translated The Sound of my Waves and Beyond Self by Ko Un, Back to Heaven by Ch'on Sang-Pyong, Faint Shadows of Love by Kim Kwang-kyu, and Farmers' Dance by Shin Kyong-Nim. Their volume of Kim Kwang-Kyu won the Translation Prize in the 1991 Republic of Korea Literary Awards, and the Ch'on Sang-Pyong volume was awarded the 1996 Korean PEN Translation Prize. In 1991, during a 2-year stay as visiting professor in Toronto (Canada), he began publishing poems in a local Korean-language newspaper. In 1992, he and five others published in Toronto a collection of their poems: 얼음비 온 다음 날. He first published poems in Korea in 1993 and his first volume, 색동 단풍숲을 노래하라, was published in May 1993. A second volume, 산은 새소리마저 쌓아 두지 않는구나, was published while he was still in hospital recovering from an operation for lung cancer in August 1998

== Awards ==
- Republic of Korea Literary Award (criticism), 1991
- Republic of Korea Literary Award (translation), 1991
- Korean Pen Translation Award (1996)
- Third Paeksok Literary Award (2001)

== Publications in English ==
- The Sound of my Waves and Beyond Self by Ko Un; translated by Kim and Brother Anthony
- Back to Heaven by Chon Sang-Pyong; translated by Kim and Brother Anthony
- Faint Shadows of Love by Kim Kwang-kyu; translated by Kim and Brother Anthony
- Farmers' Dance by Shin Kyong-Nim; translated by Kim and Brother Anthony
- "Pablo Neruda and Today's Korean Poetry," Korea Journal Vol.36 No.2 Summer 1996 pp. 92~104
- "The Poetry of Kim Kwang-Kyu: From Spirit Mountain to Kunak Mountain," Korea Journal Vol.30 No.5 May 1990 pp. 27~32

== Translation of Kim's last poem, "Rainbow" ==
- http://hompi.sogang.ac.kr/anthony/KimYM.htm
