= Ko Un =

South Korean poet (born 1933)

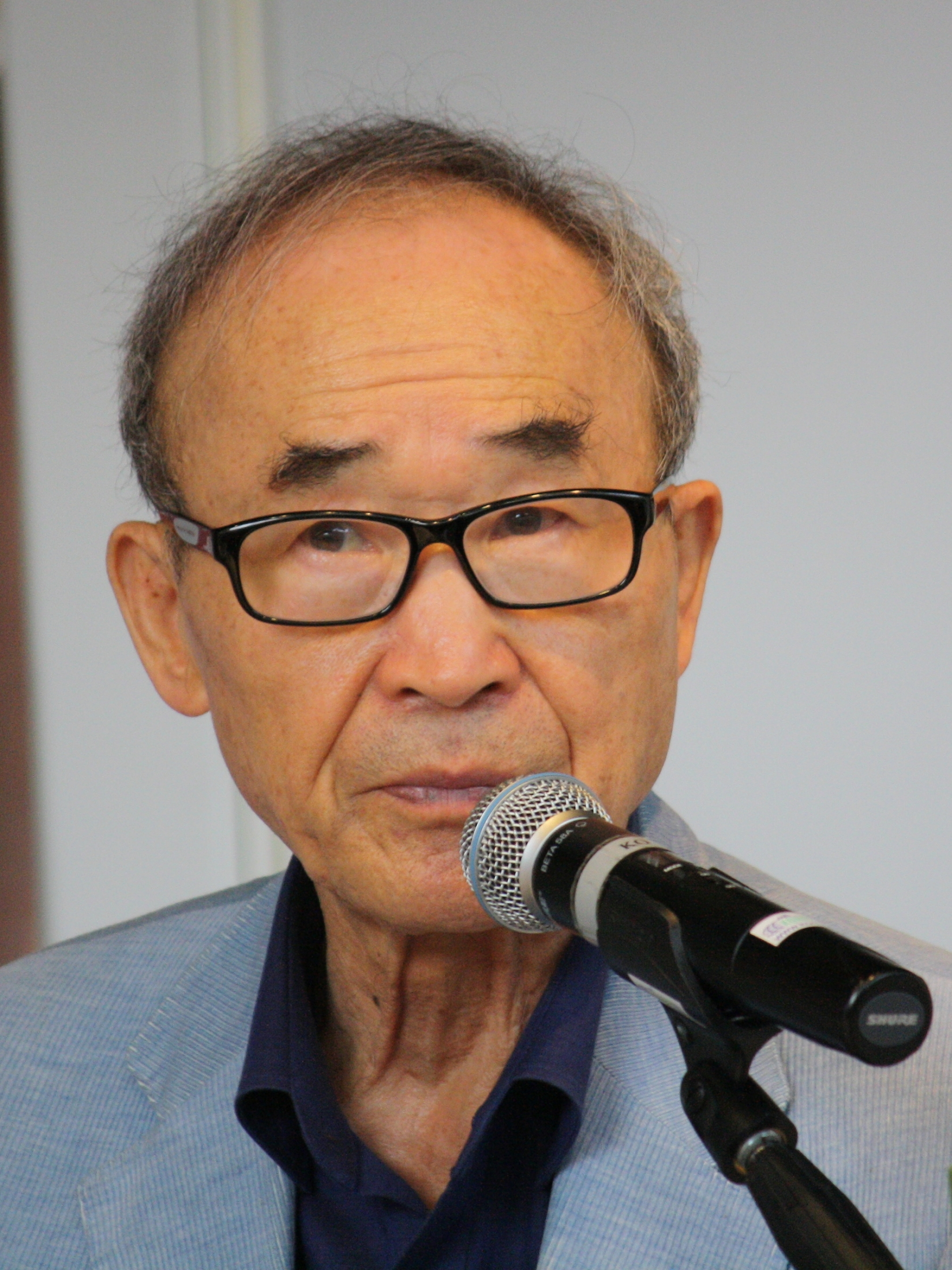
- Ko Un in 2011
- Born: Ko Un-tae; August 1, 1933 (age 93); Gunsan, Zenrahoku Province, Korea, Empire of Japan
- Citizenship: South Korean
- Spouse: Lee Sang-wha (m. 1983)
- Writing career
- Language: Korean
- Genre: Poetry

Korean name
- Hangul: 고은태
- Hanja: 高銀泰
- RR: Go Euntae
- MR: Ko Ŭnt'ae

Pen name
- Hangul: 고은
- Hanja: 高銀
- RR: Go Eun
- MR: Ko Ŭn

Ko Un (Korean: 고은; born 1 August 1933) is a South Korean poet whose works have been translated and published in more than fifteen countries. He had been imprisoned many times due to his role in the campaign for Korean democracy and was later mentioned in Korea as one of the front runners for the Nobel Prize in Literature.

== Biography ==
Ko Un, born Ko Untae in 1933, was the first child of a peasant family living in Gunsan, Zenrahoku Province, Korea, Empire of Japan. During a time when the national culture and language was being suppressed under the Japanese occupation, his grandfather taught him to read and write in Korean. When he was 12, he found by chance a book of poems by Han Ha-un, a nomadic Korean poet with leprosy, and was so impressed that he began writing himself.

Ko was still a teenager studying at Gunsan Middle School when the Korean War broke out in 1950. Many of his relatives and friends died and during it he was forced to work as a grave digger. He became so traumatized that he even poured acid into his ear to shut out the war's noise, leaving him deaf in one ear. Then in 1952 Ko decided to become a Buddhist monk. After a decade of this life, during which he published his first collection of poems, Otherworld Sensibility (Pian Kamsang, 1960), and his first novel, Cherry Tree in Another World (Pain Aeng, 1961), he chose to return to the lay life. From 1963 to 1966 he lived on the remote island of Jeju Province, where he set up a charity school, and then moved back to Seoul. However, dependent on alcohol and not at peace, he attempted to poison himself in 1970.

Another chance discovery changed this negative state. Picking up a newspaper by chance from the floor of a bar, Ko read about Jeon Tae-il, a young textile-worker who set himself alight during a demonstration in support of workers' rights. Inspired, he lost all inclination to kill himself and turned to social activism. After the South Korean government attempted to curb democracy by putting forward the Yusin Constitution in late 1972, he became very active in the democracy movement and led efforts to improve the political situation. In 1974 he established the Association of Writers for Practical Freedom and that same year became a representative of the National Association for the Recovery of Democracy. In 1978 he became vice-chairman of the Korean Association of Human Rights, and vice-chairman of the Association of National Unity in 1979.

As a result of these activities, Ko was sent to prison three times, during which he was beaten up and tortured. One of those beatings in 1979 impaired his hearing even further. In May 1980, during the coup d'état led by Chun Doo-hwan, Ko was accused of treason and sentenced to twenty years' imprisonment, although he was released in August 1982 as part of a general pardon. Life now became quieter and in 1983 Ko Un married Lee Sang-Wha, a professor of English Literature, who was eventually to become co-translator of several of his books.

Having moved to Anseong, Gyeonggi Province, he now devoted his energies to a prolific writing career but remained as active an organizer as ever. He was elected chairman of the Association of Korean Artists (1989–90) and president of the Association of Writers for National Literature (1992–93). He served as a delegate in the Committee of National Liberation in 1995. In 2000 he visited North Korea as one of the special delegates for the Inter-Korean summit and this resulted in his volume of poems South and North (2000). In the years since then he has made many other visits to North Korea. He is also chairman of a joint North-South project to compose a Pan-Korean Dictionary covering all the different forms of the language spoken today, involving dozens of scholars from both sides of the 38th Parallel. In 2014, he was appointed Goodwill Ambassador for Peace by the Korean National Commission for UNESCO.

Ko was not issued with a passport until 1990, when he was at last able to take his place abroad as a leading representative of Korean poetry. From 2007, he served as a visiting scholar in Seoul National University, where he gave lectures on poetry and literature. Since 2010, he was associated with the International Center for Creative Writing at Dankook University. Early in 2013, he was invited to stay for one semester and give several special lectures at the Ca'Foscari University of Venice, Italy, where he was awarded an Honorary Fellowship. On his return to Korea, he moved house from Ansong to Suwon, south of Seoul.

=== Controversy ===
In February 2018, Ko's legacy came under fire. In a poem that translates as "The Beast" or "Monster", published in the Korean literary magazine Hwanghae Literature in December 2017, poet Choe Yeongmi accused "En", a fictional character whose biographical details match those of Ko Un, of gross sexual misconduct. Other women in the South Korean literary community have afterwards accused Ko of decades of such conduct and allegedly using his power to coerce other vulnerable writers into sexual relations. Debate has followed, including leading to removing Ko's poems from South Korean textbooks.

=== Later activity ===
After the controversy, Ko left public life in South Korea but has since been active internationally. He has given readings at international fairs in Europe, Latin America and Asia. In 2018 he was given the New Golden Age Poetry Prize at the Mexico City Poetry Festival. According to the Korean Herald, his two volumes published since the scandal have had lackluster sales in South Korea.

== Writing ==
=== Poetry ===
Ko's poems range from quiet imagistic reflections to the epigrammatic pieces in Flowers of a Moment with their haiku-like juxtapositions:

Some say they can recall a thousand years
Some say they have already visited the next thousand years
On a windy day
I am waiting for a bus

Other works, however, are huge, like the seven-volume epic of the Korean independence movement under Japanese rule, Paektu Mountain (1987–94). There is also the monumental 30-volume Ten Thousand Lives (Maninbo). This was written over the years 1983–2010 to fulfil a vow made by Ko Un during his final imprisonment, when he was expecting to be executed. If he lived, he swore that every person he had ever met would be remembered with a poem. Speaking of his feelings at surviving the Korean War, when so many he knew had not, he has stated that "I'm inhabited by a lament for the dead. I have this calling to bring back to life all those who have died….I bear the dead within me still, and they write through me." Maninbo's discursive structure engages biographical and social themes using the rhythms of informal speech with a cumulative effect that has been compared to "the political and encyclopedic ambitions of Charles Reznikoff's Testimony." The style is documentary but often leads to a thoughtful ending.

=== Novels ===
Many of Ko Un's novels relate to Seon (Korean Zen) Buddhism and the spiritual life generally. They include The Garland Sutra or Little Pilgrim (Hwaomkyung, 1991), based on the Avatamsaka Sutra, which concerns a boy's training under a succession of Buddhist Masters. Son: Two Volumes (1995) uses saga form to tell the history of the school's Masters in ancient Korea. Mount Sumi (1999) deals with the persecution of Buddhism during the 18th century under the Confucian Joseon Dynasty and has as sub-theme the karmic links created between individuals in their former lives.

== Literary awards ==
- Korean Literature Prize (1974, 1987)
- Manhae Literary Prize (1989)
- Joongang Literary Prize (1992)
- Daesan Literary Prize (1993)
- Manhae Prize for Poetry (1998)
- Eungwan Order of Cultural Merit (2002)
- Danjae Prize (2004)
- Late Spring Unification Award (2005)
- Bjørnson Prize Order for Literature (2005)
- Cikada Prize (Swedish literary prize for East Asian poets; 2006)
- Yeongrang Poetry Prize (2007)
- Griffin Poetry Prize Lifetime Recognition Award (2008)
- Republic of Korea Arts Award for Literature (2008)
- America Award (2011)
- Golden Wreath of the Struga Poetry Evenings (2014)
- NordSud International Prize for literature (2014)
- New Golden Age Poetry Prize at the Mexico City Poetry Festival (2018)

== Publications ==
Ko began publishing in 1958. He has authored some 155 volumes, including many volumes of poetry, several works of fiction, autobiography, drama, essays, travel books, and translations from classical Korean Hanmun. As well as many of his works in English translation, he has also been translated into some dozen other languages.

Complete volumes in English

- Morning Dew: Selected poems, Paper Bark Press 1996, trans. Bro. Roger.
- The Sound of my Waves: Selected Poems 1960-1990, a bilingual edition by DapGae (Seoul) / Cornell East Asia Series 1996. Trans. Brother Anthony and Young-moo Kim.
- Beyond Self: 108 Korean Zen Poems, Parallax Press (Berkeley) 1997; reprinted as What?: 108 Zen Poems (2008). Trans. Young-Moo Kim and Brother Anthony.
- Traveler Maps: Poems by Ko Un, Tamal Vista 2004. Trans. David McCann.
- Ten Thousand Lives (selections from the first 10 volumes of Maninbo), Green Integer Press (Los Angeles) 2005.
- Little Pilgrim: A novel, Parallax Press (Berkeley) 2005. Trans. Brother Anthony and Young-moo Kim.
- The Three-Way Tavern: Selected Poems, Berkeley: University of California Press, 2006. Trans. Clare You and Richard Silberg.
- Flowers of a Moment, Rochester NY 2006. Trans. Brother Anthony, Young-moo-Kim and Gary Gach.
- Songs for Tomorrow: a collection of poems 1960–2002, Green Integer (Los Angeles) 2008. Trans Brother Anthony, Gary Gach.
- Himalaya Poems, Green Integer (Los Angeles) 2011. Trans. Brother Anthony and Lee Sang-wha.
- This Side of Time, White Pine Press 2012. Trans. Clare You and Richard Silberg.
- First Person Sorrowful, Bloodaxe Books, UK, 2012. Trans. Brother Anthony and Lee Sang-Wha.
- Maninbo: Peace and War (selections from volumes 11-20), Bloodaxe 2015. Trans. Brother Anthony and Lee Sang-Wha.
- Conversations with Ko Un, by Ramin Jahanbegloo. Orient Black Swan 2021. ISBN 978-9354420221

== See also ==
- Korean literature
- Korean poetry
- Writers Association of Korea
