= List of Treasures of South Korea (1985–1989) =

The Treasures of South Korea designation was established in 1962 and is managed by the Korea Heritage Service (KHS; formerly "Cultural Heritage Administration"). This designation is distinct from the National Treasure designation. Covered here are items designated in the years 1985 through 1989.

== List ==
No. (Note: On November 19, 2021, the Cultural Heritage Administration removed the numbering system for all of its designations, including Treasure. Previously assigned numbers are preserved here for the sake of reference.)	Image	Official names (Note: (English, Hangul, Hanja/mixed script))	Location	Dates	Refs
809		Jagyeongjeon Hall of Gyeongbokgung Palace 경복궁 자경전 景福宮 慈慶殿	Jongno District, Seoul	1985-01-08	
810		Chimney with Ten Symbols of Longevity in Relief at Jagyeongjeon Hall of Gyeongbokgung Palace 경복궁 자경전 십장생굴뚝 景福宮 慈慶殿 十長生굴뚝	Jongno District, Seoul	1985-01-08	
811		Chimneys in Amisan Garden of Gyeongbokgung Palace 경복궁 아미산 굴뚝 景福宮 峨嵋山 굴뚝	Jongno District, Seoul	1985-01-08	
812		Geunjeongmun Gate and Corridor of Gyeongbokgung Palace 경복궁 근정문 및 행각 景福宮 勤政門 및 行閣	Jongno District, Seoul	1985-01-08	
813		Injeongmun Gate of Changdeokgung Palace 창덕궁 인정문 昌德宮 仁政門	Jongno District, Seoul	1985-01-08	
814		Seonjeongjeon Hall of Changdeokgung Palace 창덕궁 선정전 昌德宮 宣政殿	Jongno District, Seoul	1985-01-08	
815		Huijeongdang Hall of Changdeokgung Palace 창덕궁 희정당 昌德宮 熙政堂	Jongno District, Seoul	1985-01-08	
816		Daejojeon Hall of Changdeokgung Palace 창덕궁 대조전 昌德宮 大造殿	Jongno District, Seoul	1985-01-08	
817		Seonwonjeon Hall of Changdeokgung Palace 창덕궁 선원전 昌德宮 璿源殿	Jongno District, Seoul	1985-01-08	
818		Tongmyeongjeon Hall of Changgyeonggung Palace 창경궁 통명전 昌慶宮 通明殿	Jongno District, Seoul	1985-01-08	
819		Junghwajeon Hall and Junghwamun Gate of Deoksugung Palace 덕수궁 중화전 및 중화문 德壽宮 中和殿 및 中和門	Jung District, Seoul	1985-01-08	
820		Hamnyeongjeon Hall of Deoksugung Palace 덕수궁 함녕전 德壽宮 咸寧殿	Jung District, Seoul	1985-01-08	
821		Yeongnyeongjeon Hall of Jongmyo Shrine 종묘 영녕전 宗廟 永寧殿	Jongno District, Seoul	1985-01-08	
822		Rock-carved Standing Buddha at Yeongworam Hermitage, Icheon 이천 영월암 마애여래입상 利川 映月庵 磨崖如來立像	Icheon, Gyeonggi	1985-01-08, 2010-08-25 renamed	
823		Yeongsanjeon Hall of Seongnamsa Temple, Anseong 안성 석남사 영산전 安城 石南寺 靈山殿	Anseong, Gyeonggi	1985-01-08	
824		Daeungjeon Hall of Cheongnyongsa Temple, Anseong 안성 청룡사 대웅전 安城 靑龍寺 大雄殿	Anseong, Gyeonggi	1985-01-08	
825		Bogwangjeon Hall of Sungnimsa Temple, Iksan 익산 숭림사 보광전 益山 崇林寺 普光殿	Iksan, North Jeolla	1985-01-08	
826		Daejeokgwangjeon Hall of Gwisinsa Temple, Gimje 김제 귀신사 대적광전 金堤 歸信寺 大寂光殿	Gimje, North Jeolla	1985-01-08	
827		Daejangjeon Hall of Geumsansa Temple, Gimje 김제 금산사 대장전 金堤 金山寺 大藏殿	Gimje, North Jeolla	1985-01-08	
828		Stone Lantern of Geumsansa Temple, Gimje 김제 금산사 석등 金堤 金山寺 石燈	Gimje, North Jeolla	1985-01-08, 2010-12-27 renamed	
829		Three-story Stone Pagoda of Geumgoksa Temple, Gangjin 강진 금곡사 삼층석탑 康津 金谷寺 三層石塔	Gangjin County, South Jeolla	1985-01-08, 2010-12-27 renamed	
830		Daeungjeon Hall of Bulgapsa Temple, Yeonggwang 영광 불갑사 대웅전 靈光 佛甲寺 大雄殿	Yeonggwang County, South Jeolla	1985-01-08	
831		Three-story Stone Pagoda of Donghwasa Temple, Suncheon 순천 동화사 삼층석탑 順天 桐華寺 三層石塔	Suncheon, South Jeolla	1985-01-08, 2010-12-27 renamed	
832		Nahanjeon Hall of Seonghyeolsa Temple, Yeongju 영주 성혈사 나한전 榮州 聖穴寺 羅漢殿	Yeongju, North Gyeongsang	1985-01-08	
833		Daejeokgwangjeon Hall of Girimsa Temple, Gyeongju 경주 기림사 대적광전 慶州 祇林寺 大寂光殿	Gyeongju, North Gyeongsang	1985-01-08	
834		Daeungjeon Hall of Daebisa Temple, Cheongdo 청도 대비사 대웅전 淸道 大悲寺 大雄殿	Cheongdo County, North Gyeongsang	1985-01-08	
835		Daeungbojeon Hall of Unmunsa Temple, Cheongdo 청도 운문사 대웅보전 淸道 雲門寺 大雄寶殿	Cheongdo County, North Gyeongsang	1985-01-08	
836		Geungnakjeon Hall of Daejeoksa Temple, Cheongdo 청도 대적사 극락전 淸道 大寂寺 極樂殿	Cheongdo County, North Gyeongsang	1985-01-08	
837		Reproduction of Celestial Chart Stone 복각천상열차분야지도 각석 複刻天象列次分野之圖 刻石	Jongno District, Seoul	1985-08-09	
838		Water Gauge at Cheonggyecheon Stream, Seoul 서울 청계천 수표 서울 淸溪川 水標	Dongdaemun District, Seoul	1985-08-09, 2010-12-27 renamed	
839		Horizontal Sundial 신법 지평일구 新法 地平日晷	Jongno District, Seoul	1985-08-09	
840		Horizontal Sundial 신법 지평일구 新法 地平日晷	Jongno District, Seoul	1985-08-09	
841		Sundials 간평일구·혼개일구 簡平日晷·渾蓋日晷	Jongno District, Seoul	1985-08-09	
842		Rain Gauge Pedestal of Seonhwadang Hall, Daegu 대구 선화당 측우대 大邱 宣化堂 測雨臺	Dongjak District, Seoul	1985-08-09	
843		Rain Gauge Pedestal of Gwansanggam (Bureau of Astronomy) 관상감 측우대 觀象監 測雨臺	Dongjak District, Seoul	1985-08-09	
844		Rain Gauge Pedestal of Changdeokgung Palace 창덕궁 측우대 昌德宮 測雨臺	Jongno District, Seoul	1985-08-09	
845		Hemispherical Sundial 앙부일구 仰釜日晷	Jongno District, Seoul	1985-08-09	
846		Wind Streamer Pedestal of Changgyeonggung Palace 창경궁 풍기대 昌慶宮 風旗臺	Jongno District, Seoul	1985-08-09	
847		Wind Streamer Pedestal of Gyeongbokgung Palace 경복궁 풍기대 景福宮 風旗臺	Jongno District, Seoul	1985-08-09	
848		Folding Screen of Sinbeop cheonmundo (Celestial Charts) at Beopjusa Temple, Boeun 보은 법주사 신법 천문도 병풍 報恩 法住寺 新法 天文圖 屛風	Boeun County, North Chungcheong	1985-08-09	
849		Gonyeo manguk jeondo (Map of the Myriad Countries of the World by Mateo Ricci)} 곤여만국전도 坤與萬國全圖	Gwanak District, Seoul	1985-08-09	
850		Daedong yeojido (Map of the Great East) 대동여지도 신유본 大東輿地圖	Seongbuk District, Seoul	1985-08-09	
851		Gwancheondae Observatory of Changgyeonggung Palace 창경궁 관천대 昌慶宮 觀天臺	Jongno District, Seoul	1985-08-09	
852		Portable Hemispherical Sundial 휴대용 앙부일구 携帶用 仰釜日晷	Yongsan District, Seoul	1986-03-14	
853		Printing Woodblock of Suseon jeondo (Comprehensive Map of the Capital) 수선전도 목판 首善全圖 木板	Seongbuk District, Seoul	1986-03-14	
854		Narrow Gun 세총통 細銃筒	Nowon District, Seoul	1986-03-14	
855		Medium Seungja Chongtong Gun 차승자총통 次勝字銃筒	Gwanak District, Seoul	1986-03-14	
856		Small Gun 소총통 小銃筒	Jongno District, Seoul	1986-03-14	
857		Large Mortar 대완구 大碗口	Nowon District, Seoul	1986-03-14	
858		Medium Mortar 중완구 中碗口	Jinju, South Gyeongsang	1986-03-14	
859		Medium Mortar 중완구 中碗口	Changwon, South Gyeongsang	1986-03-14	
860		Medium Mortar 비격진천뢰 飛擊震天雷	Jongno District, Seoul	1986-03-14	
861-1		Bullanggi Japo Cannon 불랑기자포 佛狼機子砲	Nowon District, Seoul	1986-03-14	
861-2		Bullanggi Japo Cannon 불랑기자포 佛狼機子砲	Jongno District, Seoul	2012-08-24	
862		Jija Chongtong Gun 지자총통 地字銃筒	Jinju, South Gyeongsang	1986-03-14	
863		Jija Chongtong Gun 지자총통 地字銃筒	Seo District, Busan	1986-03-14	
~~864~~		~~금고~~; ~~金鼓~~	~~Nowon District, Seoul~~	1986-03-14, 2008-10-17 removed	
865		Private Wooden Movable Type and Printing Devices 민간 목활자 및 인쇄용구 民間 木活字 및 印刷用具	Seocho District, Seoul	1986-03-14	
866		Namji girohoedo (Gathering of Elders by Namji Pond) by Yi Gi-ryong 이기룡필 남지기로회도 李起龍筆 南池耆老會圖	Gwanak District, Seoul	1986-10-15	
867		Dokseodang gyehoedo (Gathering of Officials at Dokseodang Study) 독서당계회도 讀書堂契會圖	Gwanak District, Seoul	1986-10-15	
868		Miwon gyehoedo (Gathering of Officials of the Censor-general) with Seong Se-chang's Poem 성세창 제시 미원계회도 成世昌 題詩 薇垣契會圖	Yongsan District, Seoul	1986-10-15	
869		Hagwan gyehoedo (Gathering of Military Officials) with Seong Se-chang's Poem 성세창 제시 하관계회도 成世昌 題詩 夏官契會圖	Yongsan District, Seoul	1986-10-15	
870		Hojo nanggwan gyehoedo (Gathering of Fiscal Officials) 호조랑관계회도 戶曹郞官契會圖	Yongsan District, Seoul	1986-10-15	
871		Yeonjeong gyehoedo (Gathering of Officials at Lotus Pavilion) 연정계회도 蓮亭契會圖	Yongsan District, Seoul	1986-10-15	
872		Portrait of Yi Hyeon-bo 이현보초상 李賢輔肖像	Andong, North Gyeongsang	1986-10-15	
873		Yuksangmyodo (Yuksangmyo Shrine) by Jeong Seon 정선필 육상묘도 鄭敾筆 毓祥廟圖	Gangnam District, Seoul	1986-10-15	
874		Royal Certificate of Meritorious Subject Issued to Yi Chung-won 이충원 호성공신교서 李忠元 扈聖功臣敎書	Seongnam, Gyeonggi	1986-10-15	
875-1		Jabi doryang chambeop (Repentance Ritual of the Great Compassion), Revised Version, Volumes 7-10 상교정본자비도량참법 권7~10 詳校正本慈悲道場懺法 卷七∼十	Boseong County, South Jeolla	1986-10-15; 2019-01-03 renumbered	
875-2		Jabi doryang chambeop (Repentance Ritual of the Great Compassion), Revised Version, Volumes 1-3 상교정본자비도량참법 권1~3 詳校正本慈悲道場懺法 卷一~三	Gwanak District, Seoul	1993-09-10; 2019-01-03 renumbered	
875-3		Jabi doryang chambeop (Repentance Ritual of the Great Compassion), Revised Version, Volumes 3 상교정본자비도량참법 권3 詳校正本慈悲道場懺法 卷三	Dongjak District, Seoul	2019-01-03	
876		Documents of the Yeonghae Branch of the Jaeryeong Yi Clan 재령이씨 영해파 종가 고문서 載寧李氏 寧海派 宗家 古文書	Andong, North Gyeongsang	1986-10-15	
877		Vajracchedika prajnaparamita Sutra (The Diamond Sutra) 금강반야바라밀경 金剛般若波羅密經	Jongno District, Seoul	1986-10-15	
878		Printing Woodblocks and Manuscripts of Daedong unbu gunok (Encyclopedia of Korea, Arranged by the Rhymes of the Entries) 대동운부군옥목판 및 고본 大東韻府群玉木板 및 稿本	Yecheon County, North Gyeongsang	1986-10-15	
879		Chogan ilgi (Diary of Chogan) by Gwon Mun-hae 권문해 초간일기 權文海 草澗日記	Yecheon County, North Gyeongsang	1986-10-15	
880		Jeongmallok (Record of the Conquest of Barbarians) by Yi Tak-yeong 이탁영 정만록 李擢英 征蠻錄	Andong, North Gyeongsang	1986-10-15	
881		Relics Related to Jang Mal-son 장말손유품 狀末孫遺品	Yeongju, North Gyeongsang	1986-10-15	
881-1		장말손 유품 - 6공신회맹록 張末孫 遺品 - 六功臣會盟錄	Yeongju, North Gyeongsang	1986-10-15	
881-2		장말손 유품 - 패도 張末孫 遺品 - 佩刀	Yeongju, North Gyeongsang	1986-10-15	
882		Printing Woodblocks of Gonyeo jeondo (Complete Map of the World by Ferdinand Verbiest) 곤여전도 목판 坤輿全圖 木板	Gwanak District, Seoul	1986-11-29	
883		Terrestrial Globe 지구의 地球儀	Dongjak District, Seoul	1986-11-29	
884		Three Barrel Gun 삼안총 三眼銃	Gyeongju, North Gyeongsang	1986-11-29	
885		Hyeonja Chongtong Gun 현자총통 玄字銃筒	Jinju, South Gyeongsang	1986-11-29	
886		Hwangja Chongtong Gun 황자총통 黃字銃筒	Yongsan District, Seoul	1986-11-29	
887		Transcription of Maha prajnaparamita Sutra (Perfection of Transcendental Wisdom) in Gold on Indigo Paper, Volume 175 감지금니대반야바라밀다경 권175 紺紙金泥大般若波羅蜜多經 卷一百七十五	Yongsan District, Seoul	1986-11-29	
888		Jongmunwonsangjip (Rules of Zen Buddhism) 종문원상집 宗門圓相集	Seodaemun District, Seoul	1986-11-29	
889		Yeongga Jingakdaesa jeungdoga (Song of Enlightenment) 영가진각대사증도가 永嘉眞覺大師證道歌	Seodaemun District, Seoul	1986-11-29	
890		Inwang hoguk banyagyeong (Annotated Humane King Sutra), Volumes 1-4 주인왕호국반야경 권1~4 注仁王護國般若經 卷一∼四	Seodaemun District, Seoul	1986-11-29	
891		Commentary on the Avatamsaka Sutra (The Flower Garland Sutra), Volume 42 대방광불화엄경소 권42 大方廣佛華嚴經疏 卷四十二	Seodaemun District, Seoul	1986-11-29	
892		Commentary on the Avatamsaka Sutra (The Flower Garland Sutra), Volumes 28-30 and 100-102 대방광불화엄경소 권28~30, 권100~102 大方廣佛華嚴經疏 卷二十八∼三十, 卷一百∼一百二	Seodaemun District, Seoul	1986-11-29	
893		Annotated Mahavaipulya purnabudha Sutra (The Complete Enlightenment Sutra), Volume 1 대방광원각략소주경 권상 大方廣圓覺略疏注經 卷上	Seodaemun District, Seoul	1986-11-29	
894-1		Annotated Brahmajala Sutra (The Sutra of Brahma’s Net) 주범망경 注梵網經	Seodaemun District, Seoul	1986-11-29	
895		Jewang ungi (Songs of Emperors and Kings) 제왕운기 帝王韻紀	Jung District, Seoul	1986-11-29	
896		Books of Gwon Beol’s Family 권벌 종가 전적 權橃 宗家 典籍	Bonghwa County, North Gyeongsang	1986-11-29	
896-1		권벌 종가 전적-우향계축 權橃 宗家 典籍-友鄕契軸	Bonghwa County, North Gyeongsang	1986-11-29	
896-2		권벌 종가 전적-홍치9년병진윤3월사마방목 權橃 宗家 典籍-弘治9年丙辰閏3月司馬榜目	Bonghwa County, North Gyeongsang	1986-11-29	
896-3		권벌 종가 전적-정덕2년3월문무잡과방목 權橃 宗家 典籍-正德二年三月文武雜科榜目	Bonghwa County, North Gyeongsang	1986-11-29	
896-4		권벌 종가 전적-광국원종공신녹권 權橃 宗家 典籍-光國原從功臣錄券	Bonghwa County, North Gyeongsang	1986-11-29	
896-5		권벌 종가 전적-신편고금사문유취 權橃 宗家 典籍-新編古今事文類聚	Bonghwa County, North Gyeongsang	1986-11-29	
896-6		권벌 종가 전적-역학계몽요해 權橃 宗家 典籍-易學啓蒙要解	Bonghwa County, North Gyeongsang	1986-11-29	
896-7		권벌 종가 전적-대학연의보 權橃 宗家 典籍-大學衍義補	Bonghwa County, North Gyeongsang	1986-11-29	
896-8		권벌 종가 전적-근사록 權橃 宗家 典籍-近思錄	Bonghwa County, North Gyeongsang	1986-11-29	
896-9		권벌 종가 전적-주자대전 權橃 宗家 典籍-朱子大全	Bonghwa County, North Gyeongsang	1986-11-29	
896-10		권벌 종가 전적-유향설원 權橃 宗家 典籍-劉向說苑	Bonghwa County, North Gyeongsang	1986-11-29	
896-11		권벌 종가 전적-을사정난기 權橃 宗家 典籍-乙巳定難記	Bonghwa County, North Gyeongsang	1986-11-29	
896-12		권벌 종가 전적-충재일기 權橃 宗家 典籍-沖齋日記	Bonghwa County, North Gyeongsang	1986-11-29	
896-13		권벌 종가 전적-춘양일기 權橃 宗家 典籍-春陽日記	Bonghwa County, North Gyeongsang	1986-11-29	
896-14		권벌 종가 전적-심경 權橃 宗家 典籍-心經	Bonghwa County, North Gyeongsang	1986-11-29	
896-15		권벌 종가 전적-근사록 權橃 宗家 典籍-近思錄	Bonghwa County, North Gyeongsang	1986-11-29	
897		Royal Edict of Appointment Issued to Jo Heup 조흡 고신왕지 曺恰 告身王旨	Yongsan District, Seoul	1986-11-29	
898		Royal Edict of Appointment Issued to Jo Heup 조흡 고신왕지 曺恰 告身王旨	Jung District, Seoul	1986-11-29	
899		Royal Edict Awarding Land and Slaves to Jo Heup 조흡 사패왕지 曺恰 賜牌王旨	Jung District, Seoul	1986-11-29	
900		Documents of the Buan Kim Clan 부안김씨 종중 고문서 일괄 扶安金氏 宗中 古文書 一括	Buan County, North Jeolla	1986-11-29	
901		Documents of Gwon Beol’s Family 권벌 종가 고문서 權橃 宗家 古文書	Bonghwa County, North Gyeongsang	1986-11-29	
902		Calligraphy of Gwon Beol’s Family 권벌 종가 유묵 權橃 宗家 遺墨	Bonghwa County, North Gyeongsang	1986-11-29	
903		Celadon Prunus Vase with Inlaid Plum, Bamboo, and Crane Design 청자 상감매죽학문 매병 靑磁 象嵌梅鳥竹文 梅甁	Seocho District, Seoul	1986-11-29	
904		Ancient Greek Bronze Helmet 고대 그리스 청동 투구 古代 그리스 靑銅 冑	Yongsan District, Seoul	1987-03-07	
905		Ancient Greek Bronze Helmet 김성일 종가 전적 金誠一 宗家 典籍	Andong, North Gyeongsang	1987-03-07	
906		Documents of Kim Seong-il’s Family 김성일 종가 고문서 金誠一 宗家 古文書	Andong, North Gyeongsang	1987-03-07	
907		Three-story Stone Pagoda in Namsa-ri, Gyeongju 경주 남사리 삼층석탑 慶州 南莎里 三層石塔	Gyeongju, North Gyeongsang	1987-03-09, 2010-12-27 renamed	
908		Three-story Stone Pagoda in Yongmyeong-ri, Gyeongju 경주 용명리 삼층석탑 慶州 龍明里 三層石塔	Gyeongju, North Gyeongsang	1987-03-09, 2010-12-27 renamed	
909		Flagpole Supports at Namgansa Temple Site, Gyeongju 경주 남간사지 당간지주 慶州 南澗寺址 幢竿支柱	Gyeongju, North Gyeongsang	1987-03-09, 2010-12-27 renamed	
910		Flagpole Supports with Lotus Design at Bomunsa Temple Site, Gyeongju 경주 보문사지 연화문 당간지주 慶州 普門寺址 蓮華文 幢竿支柱	Gyeongju, North Gyeongsang	1987-03-09, 2010-12-27 renamed	
911		Three-story Stone Pagoda Near Seokguram Grotto, Gyeongju 경주 석굴암 삼층석탑 慶州 石窟庵 三層石塔	Gyeongju, North Gyeongsang	1987-03-09, 2010-12-27 renamed	
912		Three-story Stone Pagoda in Ma-dong, Gyeongju 경주 마동 삼층석탑 慶州 馬洞 三層石塔	Gyeongju, North Gyeongsang	1987-03-09, 2010-12-27 renamed	
913		Rock-carved Seated Buddha at Yongjangsa Temple Site in Namsan Mountain, Gyeongju 경주 남산 용장사지 마애여래좌상 慶州 南山 茸長寺址 磨崖如來坐像	Gyeongju, North Gyeongsang	1987-03-09, 2010-08-25 renamed	
914		Two Stone Standing Buddhas in Bohwa-ri, Jeongeup 정읍 보화리 석조이불입상 井邑 普化里 石造二佛立像	Jeongeup, North Jeolla	1987-03-09, 2010-08-25 renamed	
915		Daeungbojeon Hall of Beopjusa Temple, Boeun 보은 법주사 대웅보전 報恩 法住寺 大雄寶殿	Boeun County, North Chungcheong	1987-03-09	
916		Wontongbojeon Hall of Beopjusa Temple, Boeun 보은 법주사 원통보전 報恩 法住寺 圓通寶殿	Boeun County, North Chungcheong	1987-03-09	
917		Printing Woodblocks of Baeja yebu ullyak (Concise Rhymes of the Ministry of Rites) 배자예부운략 목판 排字禮部韻略 木板	Andong, North Gyeongsang	1987-07-16	
918		Saddharmapundarika Sutra (The Lotus Sutra), Volume 7 묘법연화경 권7 妙法蓮華經 卷七	Seodaemun District, Seoul	1987-07-16	
919		Brahmajala Sutra (The Sutra of Brahma's Net) and Prajnaparamita Sutra (The Diamond Sutra) 범망경 및 금강반야바라밀경 梵網經 및 金剛般若波羅蜜經	Seodaemun District, Seoul	1987-07-16	
920		Bulseol daebo bumo eunjunggyeong (Sakyamuni's Teaching on Parental Love) 불설대보부모은중경 佛說大報父母恩重經	Seodaemun District, Seoul	1987-07-16	
921		Jinsiljujip (Book of True Pearls) 진실주집 眞實珠集	Seodaemun District, Seoul	1987-07-16	
921-3		Jinsiljujip (Book of True Pearls) 진실주집 眞實珠集	Nam District, Busan	2015-04-22	
922		Wooden Amitabha Buddha Altarpiece in Bogwangjeon Hall of Namjangsa Temple, Sangju 상주 남장사 보광전 목각아미타여래설법상 尙州 南長寺 普光殿 木刻阿彌陀如來說法像	Sangju, North Gyeongsang	1987-07-16	
923		Wooden Amitabha Buddha and Bodhisattvas Altarpiece at Gwaneumseonwon Hermitage of Namjangsa Temple, Sangju 상주 남장사 관음선원 목각아미타여래설법상 尙州 南長寺 觀音禪院 木刻阿彌陀如來說法像	Sangju, North Gyeongsang	1987-07-16	
924		Hanging Scroll Behind the Amitabha Buddha in Geungnakjeon Hall of Cheoneunsa Temple 천은사극락전아미타후불탱화 泉隱寺極樂殿阿彌陀後佛幀畵	Gurye County, South Jeolla	1987-07-16	
925		Buddhist Painting in Palsangjeon Hall of Ssanggyesa Temple (The Vulture Peak Assembly) 쌍계사팔상전영산회상도 雙溪寺八相殿靈山會相圖	Hadong County, South Gyeongsang	1987-07-16	
926		Painting of Avalokitesvara Bodhisattva 수월관음보살도 水月觀音菩薩圖	Yongsan District, Seoul	1987-07-16	
927		Gilt-bronze Standing Avalokitesvara Bodhisattva 금동관음보살입상 金銅觀音菩薩立像	Yongsan District, Seoul	1987-07-16	
928		Stupa and Reliquaries from Budoam Hermitage Site of Bonginsa Temple, Namyangju 남양주 봉인사 부도암지 사리탑 및 사리장엄구 南楊州 奉印寺 浮圖庵址 舍利塔 및 舍利莊嚴具	Yongsan District, Seoul	1987-07-29, 2010-12-27 renamed	
~~929~~		~~Gisa gyecheop (Album of Paintings of the Gathering of Elders)~~; ~~기사계첩~~; ~~耆社契帖~~	~~Yongsan District, Seoul~~	1987-12-26, 2019-03-06 removed, made National Treasure No. 325	
930		Staff and Chair of Yi Gyeong-seok and Paintings of the Conferment Banquet 이경석 궤장 및 사궤장 연회도 화첩 李景奭 几杖 및 賜几杖 宴會圖 畵帖	Yongin, Gyeonggi	1987-12-26	
~~931~~		~~Portrait of King Taejo of Joseon~~; ~~조선태조어진~~; ~~朝鮮太祖御眞~~	~~Jeonju, North Jeolla~~	1987-12-26, 2012-06-29 removed, made National Treasure No. 317	
932		Portrait of King Yeongjo 영조어진 英祖御眞	Jongno District, Seoul	1987-12-26	
933		Ksitigarbha pranidhana Sutra (Great Vows of Ksitigarbha Bodhisattva) 지장보살본원경 地藏菩薩本願經	Yongin, Gyeonggi	1987-12-26	
934		Moguja susimgyeol (Golden Teachings on Mind Cultivation) and Sabeobeo (Four Dharma-words), Korean Translation 목우자수심결 및 사법어(언해) 牧牛子修心訣 및 四法語(諺解)	Yongsan District, Seoul	1987-12-26	
935		Worin seokbo (Episodes from the Life of Sakyamuni Buddha), Volumes 11 and 12 월인석보 권11, 12 月印釋譜 卷十一, 十二	Yongsan District, Seoul	1987-12-26	
936-1		Saddharmapundarika Sutra (The Lotus Sutra), Volumes 6 and 7 묘법연화경 권6~7 妙法蓮華經 卷六~七	Yongsan District, Seoul	1987-12-26	
936-2		Saddharmapundarika Sutra (The Lotus Sutra), Volumes 6 and 7 묘법연화경 권6~7 妙法蓮華經 卷六~七	Yongsan District, Seoul	1987-12-26	
937		Jabi doryang chambeop (Repentance Ritual of the Great Compassion), Revised Version, Volume 10 상교정본자비도량참법 권10 詳校正本慈悲道場懺法 卷十	Yongsan District, Seoul	1987-12-26	
938		Annotated Mahavaipulya purnabudha Sutra (The Complete Enlightenment Sutra), Part 2 of Volume 1 대방광원각략소주경 권상의2 大方廣圓覺略疏注經 卷上之二	Yongsan District, Seoul	1987-12-26	
939		Shurangama Sutra (The Sutra of the Heroic One), Korean Translation, Volumes 4-7 and 8-10 대불정여래밀인수증료의제보살만행수능엄경 권4~7, 8~10 大佛頂如來密因修證了義諸菩薩萬行首楞嚴經 卷四∼七, 八∼十	Yongsan District, Seoul	1987-12-26	
940		Transcription of Ksitigarbha pranidhana Sutra (Great Vows of Ksitigarbha Bodhisattva) in Ink on White Paper 백지묵서지장보살본원경 白紙墨書地藏菩薩本願經	Yongsan District, Seoul	1987-12-26	
941-1		Letters of King Seonjo to Song Eon-sin and Portrait of Song Eon-sin 선조어서사송언신밀찰첩 宣祖御書賜宋言愼密札帖	Yongin, Gyeonggi	1987-12-26	
942		Documents of Hwang Jin’s Family 황진가 고문서 黃進家 古文書	Namwon, North Jeolla	1987-12-26	
943		Three-story Stone Pagoda in Ucheon-ri, Boseong 보성 우천리 삼층석탑 寶城 牛川里 三層石塔	Boseong County, South Jeolla	1988-04-01, 2010-12-27 renamed	
944		Rock-carved Seated Buddha in Yusin-ri, Boseong 보성 유신리 마애여래좌상 寶城 柳新里 磨崖如來坐像	Boseong County, South Jeolla	1988-04-01	
945		Three-story Stone Pagoda at Geumdunsa Temple Site, Suncheon 순천 금둔사지 삼층석탑 順天 金芚寺址 三層石塔	Suncheon, South Jeolla	1988-04-01, 2010-12-27 renamed	
946		Stone Stele at Geumdunsa Temple Site, Suncheon 순천 금둔사지 석조불비상 順天 金芚寺址 石造佛碑像	Suncheon, South Jeolla	1988-04-01, 2010-08-25 renamed	
947		Daeungjeon Hall of Mihwangsa Temple, Haenam 해남 미황사 대웅전 海南 美黃寺 大雄殿	Haenam County, South Jeolla	1988-04-01	
948-1		Shurangama Sutra (The Sutra of the Heroic One), Korean Translation, Volume 3 대불정여래밀인수증요의제보살만행수능엄경(언해) 권3 大佛頂如來密因修證了義諸菩薩萬行首楞嚴經(諺解) 卷三	Jung District, Seoul	1988-06-16	
948-2		Shurangama Sutra (The Sutra of the Heroic One), Korean Translation, Volume 3 대불정여래밀인수증요의제보살만행수능엄경(언해) 권3 大佛頂如來密因修證了義諸菩薩萬行首楞嚴經(諺解) 卷3	Seongnam, Gyeonggi	2010-10-25	
949		Yenyeom mita doryang chambeop (Contrition in the Name of Amitabha Buddha) 예념미타도량참법 禮念彌陀道場懺法	Yongsan District, Seoul	1988-06-16	
950		Saddharmapundarika Sutra (The Lotus Sutra), Volumes 5-7 묘법연화경 권5~7 妙法蓮華經 卷五~七	Yongsan District, Seoul	1988-06-16	
951		Royal Edict of King Seonjo Written in Hangeul 선조국문유서 宣祖國文諭書	Nam District, Busan	1988-06-16	
952		Royal Certificate of Meritorious Subject Issued to Yi Gwang-ak 이광악 선무공신교서 李光岳 宣武功臣敎書	Cheonan, South Chungcheong	1988-06-16	
953		Royal Edict of Appointment Issued to Jo Sung 조숭 고신왕지 趙崇 告身王旨	Yongsan District, Seoul	1988-06-16	
954		Red Certificate of Passing the Military Service Examination Issued to Jo Seo-gyeong 조서경 무과홍패 趙瑞卿 武科紅牌	Yongsan District, Seoul	1988-06-16	
955		Reliquaries from the Three-story Stone Pagoda of Seonamsa Temple, Suncheon 순천 선암사 삼층석탑 사리장엄구 順天 仙巖寺 三層石塔 舍利莊嚴具	Suncheon, South Jeolla	1988-06-16	
956		Bronze Cymbals of Taeansa Temple, Gokseong 곡성 태안사 청동 대바라 谷城 泰安寺 靑銅 大鈸鑼	Gokseong County, South Jeolla	1988-06-16	
957		Kim Il-son's Geomungo 김일손 거문고 金馹孫 琴	Suseong District, Daegu	1988-06-16	
958		Clay Seated Vairocana Buddha Triad of Girimsa Temple, Gyeongju 경주 기림사 소조비로자나삼불좌상 慶州 祇林寺 塑造毘盧遮那三佛坐像	Gyeongju, North Gyeongsang	1988-11-04	
959		Excavated Documents from the Clay Vairocana of Girimsa Temple, Gyeongju 경주 기림사 소조비로자나불 복장전적 慶州 祇林寺 塑造毘盧舍那佛 腹藏典籍	Gyeongju, North Gyeongsang	1988-11-04	
961-1		Saddharmapundarika Sutra (The Lotus Sutra), Volumes 4-7 묘법연화경 권4~7 妙法蓮華經 卷四~七	Gimhae, South Gyeongsang	1988-12-28, 2013-11-13 renumbered	
961-2		Saddharmapundarika Sutra (The Lotus Sutra), Volumes 4-7 묘법연화경 권4~7 妙法蓮華經 卷四~七	Changwon, South Gyeongsang	2013-11-13	
961-3		Saddharmapundarika Sutra (The Lotus Sutra), Volumes 4-7 묘법연화경 권4~7 妙法蓮華經 卷四~七	Dalseong County, Daegu	2014-01-20	
962		Saddharmapundarika Sutra (The Lotus Sutra), Volumes 6 and 7 묘법연화경 권6~7 妙法蓮華經 卷6~7	Seocho District, Seoul	1988-12-28	
963		Annotated Mahavaipulya purnabudha Sutra (The Complete Enlightenment Sutra), Volume 2 대방광원각략소주경 권하 大方廣圓覺略소注經 卷下	Seocho District, Seoul	1988-12-28	
964		Commentary on the Avatamsaka Sutra (The Flower Garland Sutra), Volume 41 대방광불화엄경소 권41 大方廣佛華嚴經疏 卷41	Seocho District, Seoul	1988-12-28	
965-1		Yukgyeong hapbu (The Six Sutras) 육경합부 六經合部	Seodaemun District, Seoul	1988-12-28	
965-2		Yukgyeong hapbu (The Six Sutras) 육경합부 六經合部	Jongno District, Seoul	2006-01-17	
966		Ksitigarbha pranidhana Sutra (Great Vows of Ksitigarbha Bodhisattva) 지장보살본원경 地藏菩薩本願經	Seocho District, Seoul	1988-12-28	
967		Sangseol gomun jinbo daejeon jeonjip (Collection of Literary Treasures), Volumes 7 and 8 상설고문진보대전전집 권7~8 詳說古文眞寶大全前集 卷七~八	Yongsan District, Seoul	1988-12-28	
968		Saddharmapundarika Sutra (The Lotus Sutra), Volume 3 묘법연화경 권3 妙法蓮華經 卷三	Yongsan District, Seoul	1988-12-28	
969		Yogacarabhumi Sastra (Discourse on the Stages of Yogic Practice), the Second Tripitaka Koreana Edition, Volume 64 재조본 유가사지론 권64 再雕本 瑜伽師地論 卷六十四	Yongsan District, Seoul	1988-12-28	
970		Mahavaipulya purnabudha Sutra (The Complete Enlightenment Sutra), Korean Translation, Part 1-1 and 2-1 to 2-3 of Volume 1, and Part 1-1 to 1-2 and 2-2 to 2-3 of Volume 2 대방광원각수다라료의경(언해) 권상 1의1, 2의1~3, 권하1의1~2, 2의2~3 大方廣圓覺修多羅了義經(諺解) 卷上 一之一, 二之一~三, 卷下 一之一~二, 二之二~三	Yongsan District, Seoul	1988-12-28	
971		Saddharmapundarika Sutra (The Lotus Sutra), Volumes 5-7 묘법연화경 권5~7 妙法蓮華經 卷五~七	Yongsan District, Seoul	1988-12-28	
972		Yogacarabhumi Sastra (Discourse on the Stages of Yogic Practice), the Second Tripitaka Koreana Edition, Volume 55 재조본 유가사지론 권55 再雕本 瑜伽師地論 卷五十五	Yongsan District, Seoul	1988-12-28	
973		Shurangama Sutra (The Sutra of the Heroic One), Korean Translation, Volumes 4, 7, and 8 대불정여래밀인수증료의제보살만행수능엄경(언해) 권4, 7, 8 大佛頂如來密因修證了義諸菩薩萬行首楞嚴經(諺解) 卷四, 七, 八	Jongno District, Seoul	1988-12-28	
974		Vajracchedika prajnaparamita Sutra (The Diamond Sutra) 금강반야바라밀경 金剛般若波羅蜜經	Jongno District, Seoul	1988-12-28	
975		Samsipbun gongdeoksogyeong (Buddhist Invocations Reciting Names of 30 Bodhisattvas) 삼십분공덕소경 三十分功德소經	Jongno District, Seoul	1988-12-28	
976		Transcription of Saddharmapundarika Sutra (The Lotus Sutra) in Silver on Oak Paper, Volumes 5 and 6 상지은니묘법연화경 권5~6 橡紙銀泥妙法蓮華經 卷五~六	Yongsan District, Seoul	1988-12-28	
977		Saddharmapundarika Sutra (The Lotus Sutra), Volume 7 묘법연화경 권7 妙法蓮華經 卷七	Gangnam District, Seoul	1988-12-28	
978		Transcription of Avatamsaka Sutra (The Flower Garland Sutra), Zhou Version, in Gold on White Paper, Volume 29 백지금니대방광불화엄경 주본 권29 白紙金泥大方廣佛華嚴經 周本 卷二十九	Yongin, Gyeonggi	1988-12-28	
979		Stone Seated Buddha from Seohyeolsa Temple Site, Gongju 공주 서혈사지 석조여래좌상 公州 西穴寺址 石造如來坐像	Gongju, South Chungcheong	1989-04-10, 2010-08-25 renamed	
980		Wooden Seated Amitabha Buddha of Bongnimsa Temple, Hwaseong 화성 봉림사 목조아미타여래좌상 華城 鳳林寺 木造阿彌陀如來坐像	Hwaseong, Gyeonggi	1989-04-10	
981		Rock-carved Seated Bhaisajyaguru Buddha in Gyosan-dong, Hanam 하남 교산동 마애약사여래좌상 河南 校山洞 磨崖藥師如來坐像	Hanam, Gyeonggi	1989-04-10, 2010-08-25 renamed	
982		Rock-carved Bodhisattva in Jangam-ri, Icheon 이천 장암리 마애보살반가상 利川 長岩里 磨崖菩薩半跏像	Icheon, Gyeonggi	1989-04-10, 2010-08-25 renamed	
983		Stone Standing Buddha from Bongeopsa Temple Site, Anseong 안성 봉업사지 석조여래입상 安城 奉業寺址 石造如來立像	Anseong, Gyeonggi	1989-04-10, 2010-08-25 renamed	
984		Stone Standing Buddha Triad in Sinhang-ri, Yeongdong 영동 신항리 석조여래삼존입상 永同 新項里 石造如來三尊立像	Yeongdong County, North Chungcheong	1989-04-10, 2010-08-25 renamed	
985		Stone Buddhas of Yonghwasa Temple, Cheongju 청주 용화사 석조불상군 淸州 龍華寺 石造佛像群	Cheongju, North Chungcheong	1989-04-10, 2010-08-25 renamed	
986		Gilt-bronze Seated Bodhisattva at Unjangam Hermitage, Cheongyang 청양 운장암 금동보살좌상 靑陽 雲藏庵 金銅菩薩坐像	Cheongyang County, South Chungcheong	1989-04-10	
987		Gilt-bronze Seated Buddha of Sinamsa Temple, Dangjin 당진 신암사 금동여래좌상 唐津 申庵寺 金銅如來坐像	Dangjin, South Chungcheong	1989-04-10	
988		Stone Standing Buddha in Daeyul-ri, Gunwi 군위 대율리 석조여래입상 軍威 大栗里 石造如來立像	Gunwi County, Daegu	1989-04-10, 2010-08-25 renamed	
989-1		Wooden Seated Amitabha Buddha Triad of Yongmunsa Temple, Yecheon 예천 용문사 목조아미타여래삼존좌상 醴泉 龍門寺 木造阿彌陀如來三尊坐像	Yecheon County, North Gyeongsang	1989-04-10	
989-2		Wooden Amitabha Buddha Altarpiece of Yongmunsa Temple, Yecheon 예천 용문사 목각아미타여래설법상 醴泉 龍門寺 木刻阿彌陀如來說法像	Yecheon County, North Gyeongsang	1989-04-10	
990		Iron Seated Vairocana Buddha of Namjangsa Temple, Sangju 상주 남장사 철조비로자나불좌상 尙州 南長寺 鐵造毘盧遮那佛坐像	Sangju, North Gyeongsang	1989-04-10	
991		Gilt-bronze Seated Avalokitesvara Bodhisattva of Daeseungsa Temple, Mungyeong 문경 대승사 금동관음보살좌상 聞慶 大乘寺 金銅觀音菩薩坐像	Mungyeong, North Gyeongsang	1989-04-10	
992		Dry-lacquered Seated Avalokitesvara Bodhisattva and Excavated Relics of Pagyesa Temple, Daegu 대구파계사건칠관음보살좌상및복장유물 大邱把溪寺乾漆觀音菩薩坐像및腹藏遺物	Dong District, Daegu	1989-04-10	
993		Dry-lacquered Seated Avalokitesvara Bodhisattva of Jangnyuksa Temple, Yeongdeok 영덕 장륙사 건칠관음보살좌상 盈德 莊陸寺 乾漆觀音菩薩坐像	Yeongdeok County, North Gyeongsang	1989-04-10	
994		Iron Seated Amitabha Buddha of Baengnyeonsa Temple, Ganghwa 강화 백련사 철조아미타여래좌상 江華 白蓮寺 鐵造阿彌陀如來坐像	Ganghwa County, Incheon	1989-04-10	
995		Stone Seated Vairocana Buddha and Wooden Mandorla of Chukseosa Temple, Bonghwa 봉화 축서사 석조비로자나불좌상 및 목조광배 奉化 鷲棲寺 石造毘盧遮那佛坐像 및 木造光背	Bonghwa County, North Gyeongsang	1989-04-10, 2010-08-25 renamed	
~~996~~		~~영주 비로사 석조아미타여래좌상~~; ~~榮州 毘盧寺 石造阿彌陀如來坐像~~	~~Yeongju, North Gyeongsang~~	1989-04-10, 2010-08-25 renumbered and renamed	
996-1		Stone Seated Amitabha Buddha of Birosa Temple, Yeongju 영주 비로사 석조아미타여래좌상 榮州 毘盧寺 石造阿彌陀如來坐像	Yeongju, North Gyeongsang	1989-04-10	
996-2		Stone Seated Vairocana Buddha of Birosa Temple, Yeongju 영주 비로사 석조비로자나불좌상 榮州 毘盧寺 石造毘盧遮那佛坐像	Yeongju, North Gyeongsang	1989-04-10	
997		Stone Buddha in Bukji-ri, Bonghwa 봉화 북지리 석조반가상 奉化 北枝里 石造半跏像	Buk District, Daegu	1989-04-10	
998		Stone Standing Amitabha Buddha at Mitaam Hermitage, Yangsan 양산 미타암 석조아미타여래입상 梁山彌陀庵 石造阿彌陀如來立像	Yangsan, South Gyeongsang	1989-04-10, 2010-08-25 renamed	
999		Dry-lacquered Seated Statue of Buddhist Monk Huirang at Haeinsa Temple, Hapcheon 합천 해인사 건칠희랑대사좌상 陜川 海印寺 乾漆希朗大師坐像	Hapcheon County, South Gyeongsang	1989-04-10	
1000		Stone Seated Statue of Buddhist Monk Seungga at Seunggasa Temple, Seoul 서울 승가사 석조승가대사좌상 서울 僧伽寺 石造僧伽大師坐像	Jongno District, Seoul	1989-04-10, 2010-08-25 renamed	
1001		Documents of the Yangsan Yi Clan 양산이씨 종가 고문서 梁山李氏 宗家 古文書	Yangsan, South Gyeongsang	1989-05-23	
1002		Documents of Gwon Ju’s Family 권주 종가 문적 權柱 宗家 文籍	Andong, North Gyeongsang	1989-05-23	
1003		Jo Jeong's Diaries During the Imjin War 조정 임진란기록 일괄 趙靖 壬辰亂記錄 一括	Sangju, North Gyeongsang	1989-05-28	
1004-1		Documents of Jo Jeong’s Family 조정 종가 문적 趙靖 宗家 文籍	Sangju, North Gyeongsang	1989-05-23	
1004-2		Documents of Jo Jeong’s Family 조정 종가 문적 趙靖 宗家 文籍	Sangju, North Gyeongsang	1989-05-23	
1005		Documents of Jang Mal-son’s Family 장말손 종가 고문서 張末孫 宗家 古文書	Yeongju, North Gyeongsang	1989-05-23	
1006		Royal Edict of Appointment Issued to Yi Jong-ju and Red Certificate of Passing the Military Service Examination Issued to Yi Im 이종주 고신왕지 및 이임 무과홍패 李從周 告身王旨 및 李臨 武科紅牌	Nam District, Ulsan	1989-05-23	
1007		Relics Related to Jo Heon 조헌 관련 유품 趙憲 關聯 遺品	Geumsan County, South Chungcheong	1989-08-01	
1008		Books of the Jeongnanggong Branch of the Hamyang Bak Clan 함양박씨 정랑공파 문중 전적 咸陽朴氏 正郞公派 門中 典籍	Seongnam, Gyeonggi	1989-08-01	
1009		Royal Edict of Labor Exemption Issued to Ssangbongsa Temple, Neungseong 능성 쌍봉사 감역교지 綾城 雙峰寺 減役敎旨	Jung District, Seoul	1989-08-01	
1010		Saddharmapundarika Sutra (The Lotus Sutra), Korean Translation, Volumes 1, 3, 4, 5, and 6 묘법연화경(언해) 권1, 3, 4, 5, 6 妙法蓮華經(諺解) 卷一, 三, 四, 五, 六	Seodaemun District, Seoul	1989-08-01	
1010-2		Saddharmapundarika Sutra (The Lotus Sutra), Korean Translation, Volumes 1 and 4 묘법연화경(언해) 권1, 4 妙法蓮華經(諺解) 卷一, 四	Goyang, Gyeonggi	2010-08-25	
1011		Ksitigarbha pranidhana Sutra (Great Vows of Ksitigarbha Bodhisattva) 지장보살본원경 地藏菩薩本願經	Seodaemun District, Seoul	1989-08-01	
1012		Sermons of Buddhist Monk Mongsan with Commentaries in Korean 몽산화상법어략록(언해) 蒙山和尙法語略錄(諺解)	Jongno District, Seoul	1989-08-01	
1013		Commentary on the Avatamsaka Sutra (The Flower Garland Sutra), Volume 68 대방광불화엄경소 권68 大方廣佛華嚴經疏 卷六十八	Danyang County, North Chungcheong	1989-08-01	
1014		Jinsiljujip (Book of True Pearls) 진실주집 眞實珠集	Seocho District, Seoul	1989-08-01	
1015		Incheon anmok (Vision of Five Supreme Patriarchs) 인천안목 人天眼目	Seocho District, Seoul	1989-08-01	
1016		Annotated Mahavaipulya purnabudha Sutra (The Complete Enlightenment Sutra), Part 2 of Volume 1 대방광원각약소주경 권상의2 大方廣圓覺略疏注經 卷上의二	Danyang County, North Chungcheong	1989-08-01	
1017		Avatamsaka Sutra (The Flower Garland Sutra) Jin Version, Volume 15, Zhou Version, Volume 38, Zhenyuan Version, Volumes 2 and 38 대방광불화엄경 진본 권15, 주본 권38, 정원본권2, 38 大方廣佛華嚴經 晋本 卷十五, 周本 卷三十八, 貞元本 卷二, 三十八	Seocho District, Seoul	1989-08-01	
