= Changdeokgung =

Palace in Seoul, South Korea

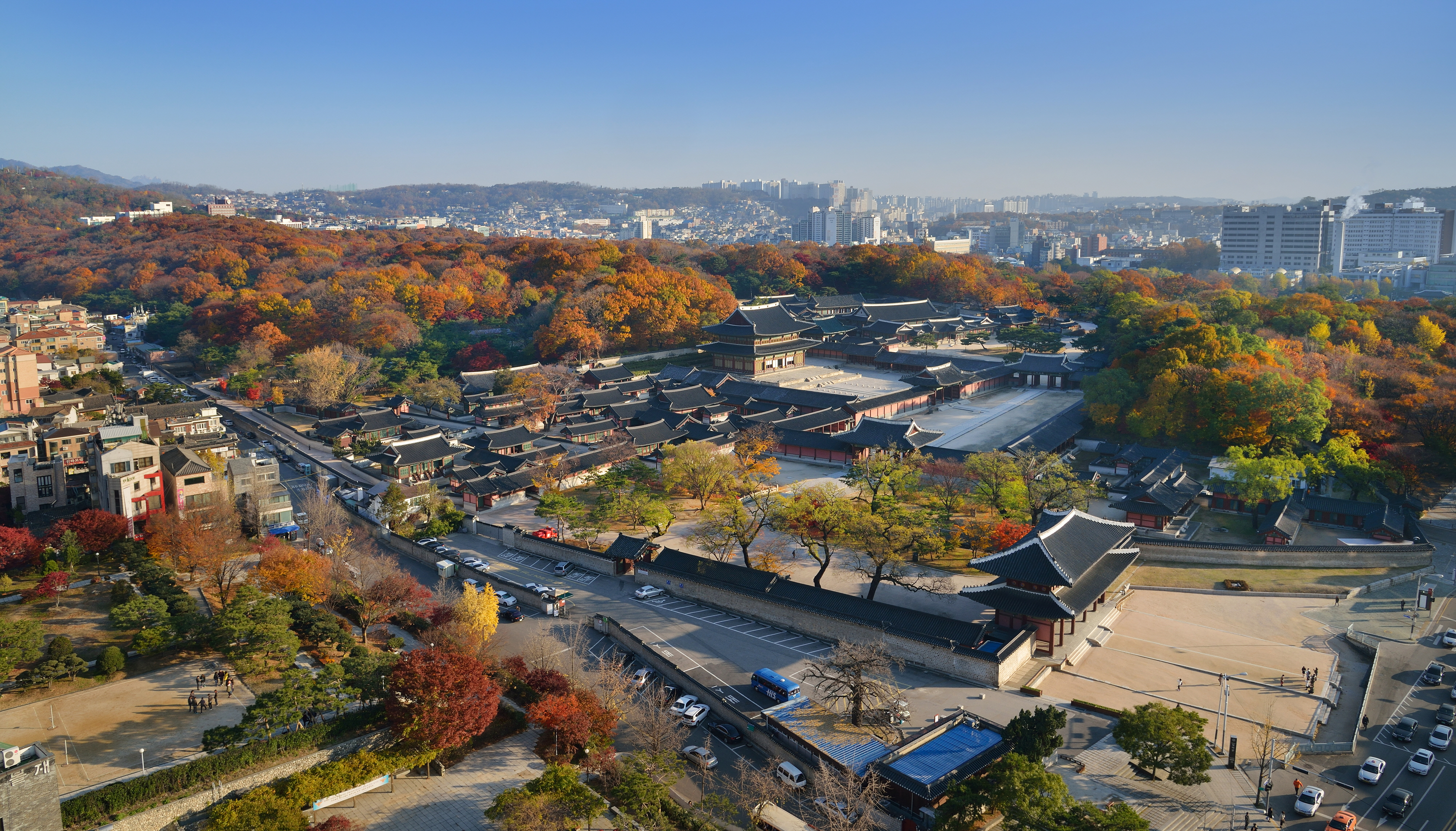
- Overview of the palace (2012)

General information
- Location: Seoul, South Korea
- Coordinates: 37°34′46″N 126°59′34″E

Design and construction
- Designations

UNESCO World Heritage Site
- Official name: Changdeokgung Palace Complex
- Criteria: Cultural: (ii), (iii), (iv)
- Designated: 1997
- Reference no.: 816
- Area: 57.9 ha (0.224 sq mi)

Historic Sites of South Korea
- Official name: Changdeokgung Palace Complex
- Designated: 1963-01-18

Website
- eng.cdg.go.kr/main/main.htm

Korean name
- Hangul: 창덕궁
- Hanja: 昌德宮
- RR: Changdeokgung
- MR: Ch'angdŏkkung

Changdeokgung (Korean: 창덕궁; Hanja: 昌德宮) is a former royal palace in Seoul, South Korea. A UNESCO World Heritage Site and a Historic Site of South Korea, it is among the best preserved of all Korean palaces. It and its neighboring palace Changgyeonggung have together been called the "East Palace".

Changdeokgung was established in 1405. It was the second palace to be established in Seoul, after Joseon's official main palace Gyeongbokgung. Despite Gyeongbokgung's legally superior status, a majority of kings preferred to reside in Changdeokgung instead. In 1592, amidst the Imjin War, Changdeokgung and all the other palaces in the city were completely destroyed. After the war, due to budgetary constraints, Gyeongbokgung was not repaired, while Changdeokgung and Changgyeonggung were. This effectively made Changdeokgung Joseon's main palace for several centuries.

In the late 19th century, under the reign of the penultimate Korean monarch Gojong, Gyeongbokgung was rebuilt and the royal family moved out of Changdeokgung and into Gyeongbokgung, although they would again move to another palace Deoksugung in 1897. In 1907, Gojong was forced by Japan to abdicate, and his son and final Korean monarch Sunjong ascended the throne and made Changdeokgung his official palace. In 1910, Japan colonized Korea, and proceeded to heavily alter the palace. The Korean royal family continued to reside in the palace even after the 1945 liberation of Korea and into the late 20th century.

Changdeokgung is now a major tourist attraction. In 1997, it was made a UNESCO World Heritage Site. The palace's Secret Garden, long beloved by Korean monarchs, are now mostly available to the public, with some sections requiring tours to be booked.

== Name ==
"Changdeokgung" means "Palace of Prospering Virtue". The palace received this name on the 25th day, 10th month of 1404, shortly after the first phase of its construction was completed.

Changdeokgung and its neighboring palace Changgyeonggung are together known as the "Eastern Palace" (동궐; 東闕; Donggwol; Tonggwŏl), as they are located to the east of the city's main palace Gyeongbokgung.

== History ==
=== Establishment ===
In 1392 (Korean calendar), Joseon was established. Afterwards, the state's capital Hanyang (also called Hanseong and later called Seoul) was established and Gyeongbokgung was made its main palace (법궁; 法宮; pŏpkung). Due to political turmoil, the capital was temporarily moved to Kaesong and then back to Hanyang in 1404. King Taejong (r. 1400–1418) then ordered the establishment of Changdeokgung as a secondary palace (이궁; 離宮; igung). His possible motivations for this order have been analyzed. A number of scholars have argued Taejong wanted to avoid Gyeongbokgung because he associated it with unpleasant memories of familial deaths there and thought it had inauspicious feng shui qualities. Historians Lee et al. have also argued that he wanted a secondary palace to be freer from the political influences of government offices and politicians in and around Gyeongbokgung.

A temporary office (Note: Called Igungjosŏngdogam (이궁조성도감; 離宮造成都監).) was established to manage the creation of the palace. Changdeokgung's location was finalized on the 6th day, 10th month of 1404, and construction began that day. (Note: The palace was built in the administrative district Hyanggyo-dong (향교동).) Under the supervision of Yi Chik, numerous artisans, soldiers, monks, and commoners worked on the construction. The first phase of construction was completed on the 19th day, 10th month of 1405. Taejong entered the palace on the 20th day of that month and held a celebration banquet there. At the time, there were only several complete buildings in the palace, including the royal bedchambers and bathhouse. The palace then had either a total of 287 rooms (칸; k'an) or 192 rooms. There was likely not much space for government offices in the palace for government offices at the time; offices in and around Gyeongbokgung were repaired and officials likely went back and forth between those and Changdeokgung. Meanwhile, construction continued. In 1406, the shrine Insojeon (인소전; 仁昭殿; Insojŏn) and a Buddhist shrine were completed in the rear garden area, along with the pavilion Gwangyeollu (광연루; 廣延樓; Kwangyŏllu); in 1408, a pond was dug; and in 1411, a pavilion (Note: Initially called Haeonjeong (해온정; 解溫亭; Haeonjŏng), renamed Sindokjae (신독재; 愼獨齋; Sindokchae) in 1414.) was completed. In 1408, the former king Taejo died at Changdeokgung.

=== Before the Imjin War ===
For the rest of his reign, Taejong primarily resided in Changdeokgung. Gyeongbokgung's restoration was ordered only after Taejong had moved into Changdeokgung. Even after his abdication, he resided in the palace Suganggung (수강궁; 壽康宮; later became Changgyeonggung) next to Changdeokgung; from there he influenced the reign of his son Sejong the Great (r. 1418–1450). Even after Taejong's abdication, construction continued. Part of a building collapsed and the supervisor of that building's construction was exiled as punishment. By 1418, facilities were deemed adequate enough to hold more significant ceremonies at Changdeokgung instead of at Gyeongbokgung. From the third year of Sejong's reign, Sejong began putting more emphasis on Gyeongbokgung and moved frequently between the two palaces. In 1426, he ordered that many structures in Changdeokgung be named. In 1427, he entirely moved out of Changdeokgung and resided primarily in Gyeongbokgung, although he continued moving between the two frequently. King Sejo (r. 1455–1468) significantly expanded Changdeokgung to the north and east. For one such project, 19,000 people from the Hanyang region were assembled. King Seongjo (r. 1469–1495) also expanded the palace and resided in Changdeokgung for the entirety of his reign. In 1475, he had all 29 of the palace's gates named and held a ceremony for the installation of their name plaques. As there was not enough space in Changdeokgung for all the living queens in the royal family, he decided to expand Changgyeonggung for them instead. King Yeonsangun (r. 1495–1506) also greatly renovated the palace, although renovations were put to a halt when he was deposed.

=== Destruction and reconstruction ===
In 1592, during the 1592–1598 Imjin War, all the city's palaces were completely burned down. It is debated who burned down the palaces, as surviving contemporary records are from intellectuals who did not witness the burnings. Various contemporary Korean texts, including the Veritable Records of Seonjo, report hearsay that it was Korean commoners who burned down the palace to destroy palace records. When the Japanese invaders entered the city on the 2nd day, 5th month of that year, Gyeongbokgung was still intact. Japanese discipline in the city was reportedly initially high, but when they began suffering defeats, they took their frustrations out on the city and locals, burning buildings and killing.

After the war, efforts began to repair the city's palaces. Initially, plans were drawn up to have Gyeongbokgung repaired, but these were not acted upon. There is a record of arguments against Gyeongbokgung's reconstruction because of perceived inauspicious qualities of that palace. In addition, Joseon's economy had been devastated by the war, and funding for repairing Gyeongbokgung was likely difficult to procure. Changdeokgung was restored instead; a number of buildings were recreated in their original locations. The first round of restorations was completed during the reign of King Gwanghaegun (r. 1608–1623) on the 1st day, 9th month of 1610. However, Gwanghaegun expressed little interest in Changdeokgung, and continued to reside in the temporary palace Gyeongungung (later became Deoksugung). In 1617, he had the palaces In'gyŏnggung and Kyŏngdŏkkung established.

In 1623, during the Injo coup that installed King Injo (r. 1623–1649), rebels burned down almost all the buildings in Changdeokgung. Only Injeongjeon, two buildings for the Owi, a palace pharmacy, (Note: 내약방; 內藥房; Naeyakbang; Naeyakpang) a building for the government office Ch'unch'ugwan, a building called Biseunggak, (Note: 비승각; 丕承閣; Pisŭnggak) a building for the government office Hongmun'gwan, and a building called Sujeongjeon (Note: 수정전; 壽靜殿; Sujŏngjŏn) were spared. Injo was crowned at Gyeongbokgung, and resided at Changgyeonggung. He had In'gyŏnggung and Kyŏngdŏkkung demolished and recycled to repair Changdeokgung and Changgyeonggung. Injo had the rear gardens renovated, and spent much relaxation time there. In 1624, during Yi Kwal's Rebellion, Changgyeonggung was mostly burned down. Injo then resided in Kyŏngdŏkkung temporarily, and first ordered that Changgyeonggung be repaired. In 1633, after repairs on Changgyeonggung were completed, Injo ordered that Changdeokgung be repaired. He then began to temporarily reside in the palace pharmacy. Construction work on palaces was interrupted and delayed by the 1636 Qing invasion of Joseon. Minor construction projects occurred in the meantime, especially in the rear garden. Significant construction resumed in 1647 and concluded after five months in 1648; a major reason why construction was able to be finished in five months was because of recycling of buildings from In'gyŏnggung. In total there were around 735 rooms in the palace around this time. One significant change after the reconstruction was the presence of more government office buildings. This was in part because the government offices in Gyeongbokgung had not been restored.

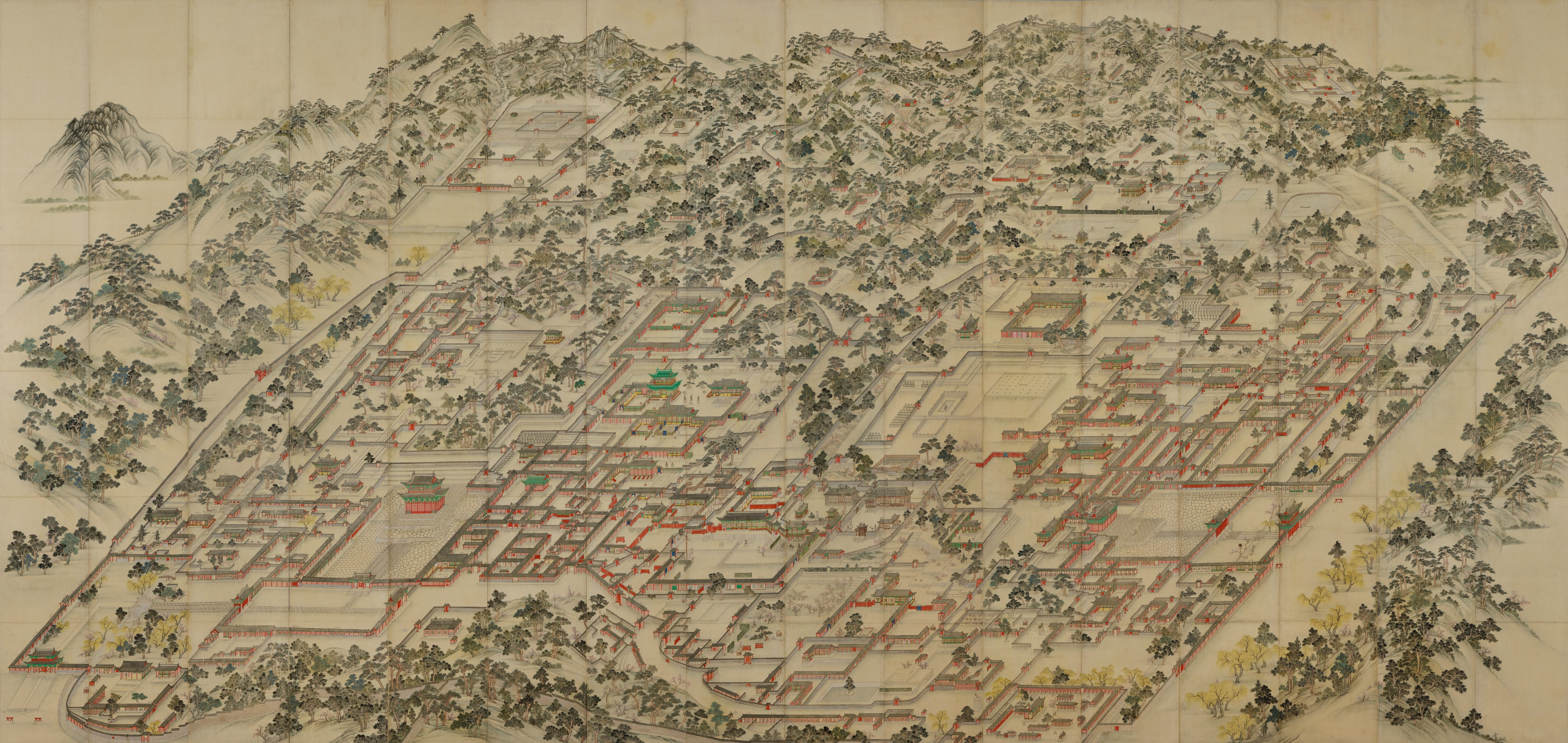
This painting, Donggwoldo, depicts Changdeokgung (left) and Changgyeonggung (right) in c. 1824 – c. 1830

After this reconstruction and without rivalry from Gyeongbokgung, Changdeokgung became the definitive main palace of Joseon. More buildings continued to be constructed in the palace. There was a fire in the palace in 1671. Under the reign of King Sukjong (r. 1674–1720), the rear garden reached its greatest extent. In 1687, a fire destroyed almost all of the Mansujeon area. In 1702, a fire destroyed part of the East Palace. Succeeding kings continued to expand and renovate the palace, although King Yeongjo (r. 1724–1776) ordered much fewer repairs as he primarily resided in Gyeonghuigung. There were a number of fires during the reign of King Sunjo (r. 1800–1834), with a major one occurring in the 10th month of 1833. During his reign, most construction at the palace was either rebuilding or maintenance work. By the 19th century, Changdeokgung and Changgyeonggung were functionally a single palace. The two had some unique government offices, although they had some facilities with overlapping purposes.

=== Late Joseon and Korean Empire periods ===
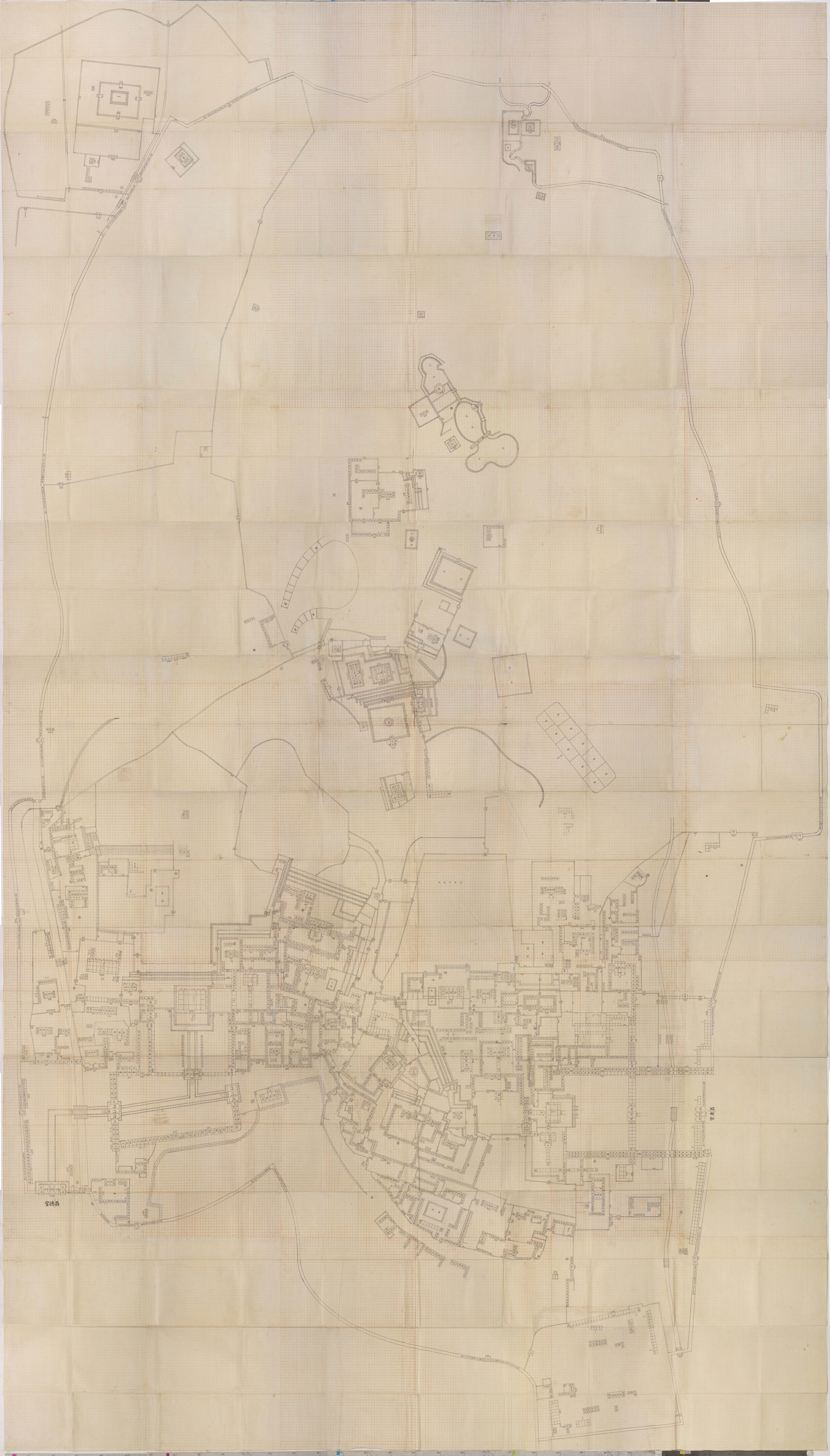
A map (Note: Entitled Tonggwŏldohyŏng (동궐도형; 東闕圖形).) of Changdeokgung, Changgyeonggung, and the rear gardens (c. 1908)

In 1865, efforts began to restore Gyeongbokgung. King Gojong (r. 1864–1907) and his family moved out of Changdeokgung and into Gyeongbokgung on the 2nd day, 7th month of 1868. Although Gyeongbokgung was officially made Joseon's main palace, Changdeokgung continued to see some use. Gyeongbokgung experienced major fires in 1873 and 1876. After the 1876 fire, the royal family moved back into Changdeokgung and did not return to Gyeongbokgung until 1885, after the 1884 Kapsin Coup. The king resided mostly in Gyeongbokgung until 1895. Meanwhile, more maintenance work occurred at Changdeokgung. Such work was interrupted in by the 1882 Imo Incident. In 1891, a number of Changdeokgung's buildings were disassembled and moved to Gyeongbokgung.

Amidst increasing Japanese influence over Korea and the 1895 assassination of Empress Myeongseong at Gyeongbokgung, Gojong fled Gyeongbokgung and made Gyeongungung his official palace. From there, he established the Korean Empire and crowned himself emperor. Gojong did not significantly use Changdeokgung thereafter. Some minor construction work continued at the palace in his absence.

In 1905, Korea was made a protectorate of Japan, governed by the Japanese Residency-General of Korea. On July 19, 1907, Gojong was forcefully deposed by Japan and replaced by his son and the final Korean monarch Emperor Sunjong (r. 1907–1910). After ascending the throne, Sunjong made Changdeokgung his primary residence, while Gojong continued to stay in Deoksugung. Historian Lee Gyu-cheol argued that Japan moved Sunjong to Changdeokgung in order to separate him from his father. Soon after his coronation, Sunjong ordered that Changdeokgung be repaired. He moved into the palace in November of that year. The residency-general oversaw the demolition of large portions of the palace from 1907 to 1909; this has since been viewed critically by Lee et al., who argued it was an attempt to demolish a symbol of Korean sovereignty.

=== Colonial period ===
On August 29, 1910, Korea became a colony of Japan. According to a 1912 document, the Office of the Yi Dynasty, an organization representing the former Korean royal family, owned the palace. Japan continued significantly altering the palace, demolishing dozens of buildings. Despite this, the overall outer boundary of the palace and its rear garden remained mostly unchanged throughout the colonial period.

Around 5 p.m. on November 10, 1917, a major fire broke out in the palace. It began in the former emperor's bedchambers Daejojeon and destroyed the naejŏn area of the palace. The fire was extinguished by 8 p.m. that day. Numerous valuables and historic relics were lost in the fire. Reconstruction work began soon after and lasted for years afterwards, although it was delayed by the 1919 March First Movement protests. The colonial government ordered that many of Gyeongbokgung's buildings be demolished and recycled for reconstructing Changdeokgung. Daejojeon was reconstructed by 1920, and the former royal family resumed living in it.

Sunjong died in the palace on April 25, 1926. Historian Se-Mi Oh argued that, after Sunjong's death, efforts to modify the palace accelerated. In either 1927 or 1931, the road Yulgok-ro was constructed between Jongmyo and Changdeokgung, separating the two entities for the first time. Oh described the separation as "direct violence against the sacred ancestral shrine and the monarchy".

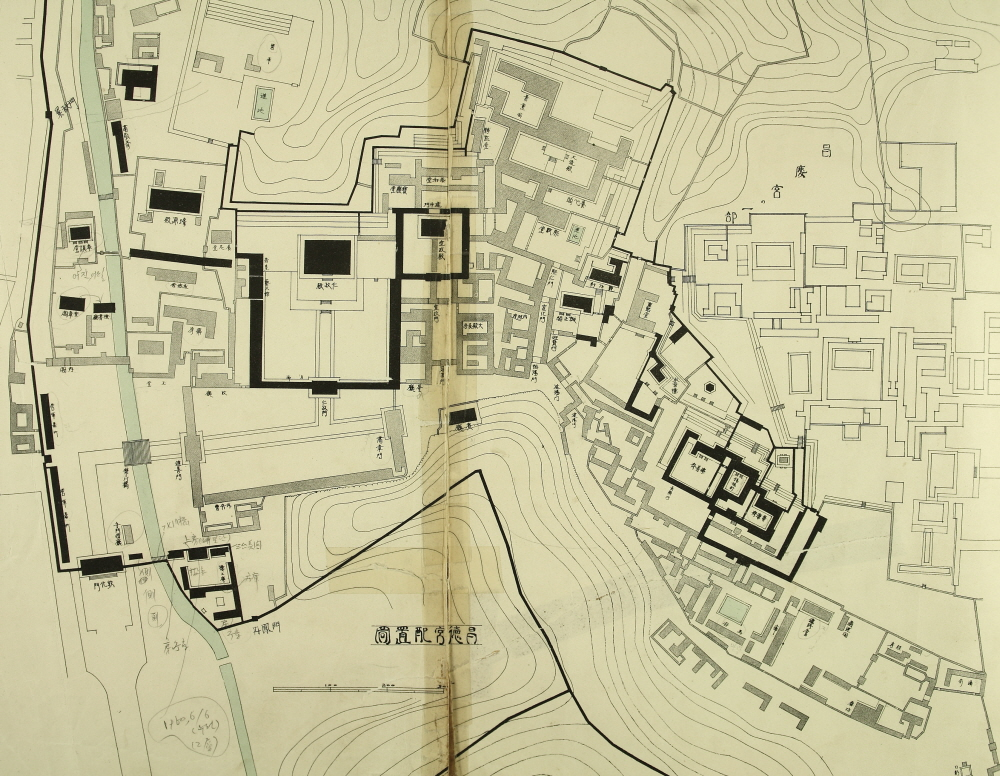
Map of Changdeokgung published in 1930; extant structures colored in black, demolished structures colored in grey

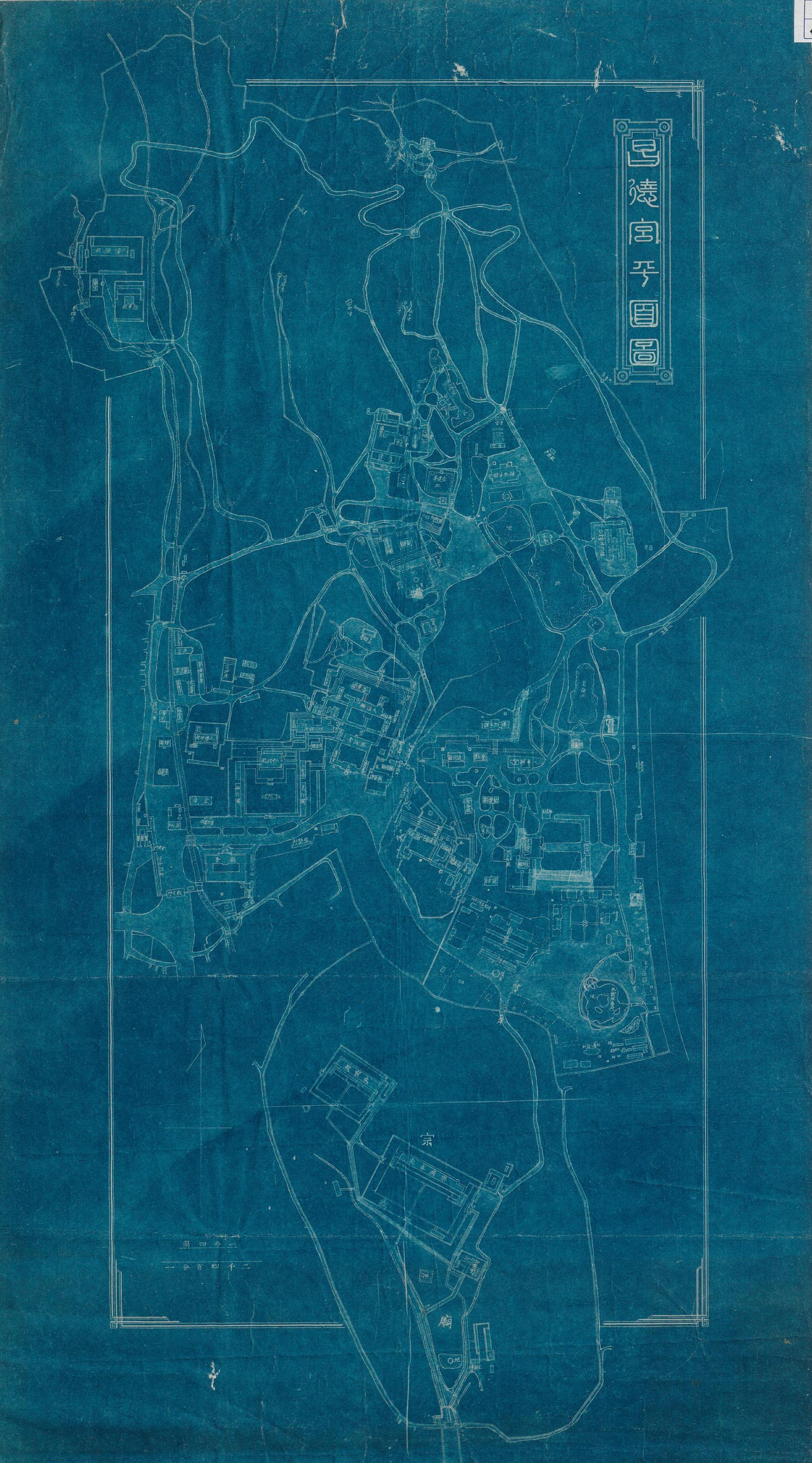
Map of Changdeokgung, Changgyeonggung, the rear gardens, and Jongmyo (produced around 1921 to 1932)

=== Post-liberation ===
Parts of the palace (notably Nakseon-jae hall) continued to function as a royal residence up to 1989, when both Princess Deokhye and Crown Princess Bangja died. Other post-WWII residents included Empress Sunjeong (Sunjong's second wife), Crown Prince Yi Un, his son Yi Ku and Yi Ku's wife Julia Mullock. Residence for former royals in the palace in the post-war period was at the whim of South Korean presidents, and after the Korean liberation in 1945. The resignation of Syngman Rhee finally allowed former imperial family members to return.

Changdeokgung was added to the UNESCO World Heritage List in 1997. The UNESCO committee stated the place was an "outstanding example of Far Eastern palace architecture and garden design" being exceptional because the buildings are "integrated into and harmonized with the natural setting" and adapted "to the topography and retaining indigenous tree cover."

== Design and layout ==
The palace was designed in consideration of both ancient Chinese principles and practicality. Changdeokgung's primary layout is based on the three gates and three courtyards (삼문삼조; 三門三朝; sammunsamjo) system, from the Chinese work Kaogongji, part of the Rites of Zhou. The system advocates for palaces to have three main sections that are to be accessed in sequential order. The sections proceed from public-facing to private. These sections are the first gate Donhwamun and courtyard (외조; 外朝; oejo; used for government offices and public-facing events), second gate Jinseonmun and courtyard (치조; 治朝; ch'ijo; used for conducting politics between the king and his subjects), and third gate Injeongmun and courtyard (연조; 燕朝; yŏnjo; where the king and his family resided). Lee et al. subdivided the palace as such: oejŏn, naejŏn, East Palace, government offices, and rear gardens (also called Secret Garden).

Changdeokgung is based primarily on a west to east axis, in contrast to Gyeongbokgung's south to north axis. Correspondingly, the outer palace proceeds east to the inner palace.

There are numerous mulberry trees around the palace, the leaves of which can be used to feed silkworms. This is possibly linked to several queens having raised silkworms in the palace.

=== Relationship with Changgyeonggung ===
Changdeokgung and Changgyeonggung have been strongly interlinked, and have been described as functionally being a single palace. Buildings for which there was insufficient space in Changdeokgung were often constructed in Changgyeonggung instead. Changdeokgung and Changgyeonggung are separated by the gate Geonyangmun (건양문; 建陽門; Kŏnyangmun). Over time, various contradicting claims have been made about which buildings (particularly those on the border of the two palaces) belonged to which palace. Such claims were made about the East Palace, Junghuidang, and Changgyeonggung's Jeoseungjeon (저승전; 儲承殿; Chŏsŭngjŏn).

According to a 1912 document, the two palaces were then considered to belong to the same administrative district: Waryong-dong. The two palaces were physically divided with a border wall during the colonial period. In 1963, the border wall was used to define a formal legal boundary between the two palaces. This boundary has persisted to the present.

== Landmarks ==
=== Outer gates ===
Image	Structure
	Donhwamun (돈화문; 敦化門; Tonhwamun) The main and south gate of the palace. It is a designated Treasure of South Korea and the oldest extant gate of all Joseon palaces. It was completed in 1412. It was destroyed in 1592, during the Imjin War and reconstructed in 1607 or 1608. There are no records of it being destroyed thereafter, although it was restored or remodeled on a number of occasions. There is a wŏltae in front of the gate. The wŏltae was demolished in the early 1900s and was restored in 1997.
	Geumhomun (금호문; 金虎門; Kŭmhomun; 'Metal Tiger Gate') The west gate of the palace. It is so named because of Chinese tradition where metal corresponds to west and the White Tiger is the guardian of the west. It was named in 1475 and was among the most frequently used gates in the palace.
	Yogeummun (요금문; 曜金門; Yogŭmmun) A small gate to the northwest of the palace. It was not often used.
	Danbongmun (단봉문; 丹鳳門; Tanbongmun) A small gate on the south side of the palace. It was used mainly by kungnyŏ (court ladies) and the extended royal family, and was among the most frequently used gates in the palace. It was named in 1475.
	Gyeongchumun (경추문; 景秋門; Kyŏngch'umun) A small gate to the west of the palace. It was rarely used.
	Geonmumun (건무문; 建武門; Kŏnmumun) A small north gate to the palace. It is named for the mythological Black Turtle-Snake, which is associated with north. The gate was rarely used. It currently exits to the Sungkyunkwan University campus and is generally inaccessible to the public.

=== Oejo ===
Oejo (외조; 外朝) refers to the part of a palace where the king conducted state affairs. It can be subdivided into the chŏngjŏn (정전; 正殿; jeongjeon; main area) and p'yŏnjŏn (편전; 便殿; pyeonjeon; secondary area).

==== Oejŏn ====
Image	Structure
	Jinseonmun (진선문; 進善門; Chinsŏnmun; 'Speaking Reverently [to the King] Gate') This gate was completed on the 18th day, 3rd month of 1411. At the time, it possibly served as the outermost gate to the palace. It was demolished in 1908 and was reconstructed in 1999.
	Sukjangmun (숙장문; 肅章門; Sukchangmun; 'Majestic and Brilliant Gate') A large gate that leads into the naejŏn. It was named in 1475. Its right and left annexes were destroyed in the Imjin War, and rebuilt in 1647. It was destroyed during the colonial period and reconstructed in 1996.
	Injeongmun (인정문; 仁政門; Injŏngmun) Gate to Injeongjeon and a Treasure. There is no record of when it was built, but it is presumed to have been completed around the time of the palace's founding. It was destroyed in 1592 and rebuilt during the reign of Gwanghaegun. It burned down in 1744 and was rebuilt in 1745; this version has persisted until the present. The gate and corridors were restored to their pre-colonial states from 1992 to 1996.
	Injeongjeon (인정전; 仁政殿; Injŏngjŏn; 'Hall of Benevolent Governance') The throne hall of the palace and a National Treasure. It was built possibly around 1405. It was destroyed during the 1592–1598 Imjin War, rebuilt, and again destroyed in 1803 and rebuilt in 1804. This version of the building has persisted until the present, although it was renovated over time. The building stands on a wŏltae. Major state events were held at this building and its front courtyard, such as enthronement ceremonies.
	Seonjeongmun (선정문; 宣政門; Sŏnjŏngmun) It was rebuilt in 1647; this version has persisted until the present.
	Seonjeongjeon (선정전; 宣政殿; Sŏnjŏngjŏn; 'Spreading Governance Hall') A single-story hall where the king received council and conducted politics. It is a designated Treasure. Spirit tablets were also possibly stored here. It was built in 1405 and originally named Jogyecheong (조계청; 朝啓廳; Chogyech'ŏng). It received its current name in 1461. After being destroyed in 1592 during the Imjin War, it was rebuilt in 1608. It was destroyed in 1623 during the Injo coup and rebuilt in 1647, using materials recycled from a building called Gwangjeongjeon in In'gyŏnggung. It has since become the oldest extant building in the palace. It is the only remaining Joseon palace building with blue roof tiles, which were then considered luxurious and difficult to make. During the colonial period, the building was opened to the public, and glass put in its windows. The building was restored to its pre-colonial appearance in 1996.

==== Government offices ====
The government offices inside palaces are called kwŏllaegaksa (궐내각사; 闕內各司; gwollaegaksa). Changdeokgung's facilities were relatively small and meant for daily work with the king; most large government ministry facilities were located outside the palace, for example on Yukcho Street. After being destroyed in 1592 during the Imjin War, government offices were rebuilt in 1647. Many offices that had once existed in Gyeongbokgung were moved over to Changdeokgung. All government office buildings in front of Seonjeongjeon and Huijeongdang were demolished between 1907 and 1909.

Image	Structure
	Imunwon (이문원; 摛文院; Imunwŏn) A royal library building that went by a number of names, including "Naegak" (내각; 內閣) and "Kyujanggak". The latter name has been applied to several different buildings, depending on which held the royal library's collection at the time. This building was completed on the 10th day, 3rd month of 1781, and the royal library was moved from Juhamnu to Imunwon.
	Geomseocheong (검서청; 檢書廳; Kŏmsŏch'ŏng; 'Inspect Books Office') It was built in 1783 and used by the Kyujanggak. It was demolished some time between 1911 and 1921.
	Bongmodang (봉모당; 奉謨堂; Pongmodang) A hall used an archive for the possessions of previous monarchs.
	Chaekgo (책고; 冊庫; ch'aekko; 'Book Storage') An annex building used by the Kyujanggak to store books.
	Yemungwan (예문관; 藝文館; Yemun'gwan) There was a fire here on the 6th day, 3rd month of 1811.
	Hongmungwan (홍문관; 弘文館; Hongmun'gwan) Also called Okdang (옥당; 玉堂; 'Jade Hall'). Used by the government office Hongmun'gwan, which maintained palace records and advised the king. It was demolished some time between 1911 and 1921.
	Naeuiwon (내의원; 內醫院; Naeŭiwŏn) A part of the palace that used to house the palace pharmacy Naeŭiwŏn. The organization was also called Yakbang (약방; 藥房; 'hospital'), and began to go by Naeŭiwŏn in 1443.
	Eokseongnu (억석루; 憶昔樓; Ŏksŏngnu; 'Remembering the Past Building') A two-story building likely used by the Naeŭiwŏn as a storage facility for medicines.

=== Naejo ===
==== Naejŏn ====
Naejŏn (내전; 內殿; naejeon) refers to a part of a palace where a king or queen resided. Palace women, particularly those of the Naemyŏngbu, also often used this space. When space for buildings became insufficient in this part of the palace, buildings were constructed in Changgyeonggung instead. The naejŏn experienced a fire in 1833 and was rebuilt in 1834. It was completely destroyed in the 1917 fire.

Image	Structure
	Huijeongdang (희정당; 熙政堂; Hŭijŏngdang; 'Peaceful Governance Hall') A hall and designated Treasure. It was originally built as a bed chamber for the king; by Sunjong's reign it was used as a council hall. It was destroyed in 1592 and rebuilt in 1608. It was destroyed and rebuilt several more times; the building's current iteration was built in 1920.
	Daejojeon (대조전; 大造殿; Taejojŏn; 'Achieving Greatness Hall') A hall used as the main living quarters for the king and office of the queen. It is a designated Treasure. It was destroyed in 1592 and rebuilt in 1608. It was destroyed and rebuilt several times afterwards; the current iteration was built in 1920. The building was host to numerous historic happenings. For example, in one of its attached halls, Heungbokheon (흥복헌; 興福軒; Hŭngbokhŏn), the final cabinet meeting was held before Korea's 1910 annexation. Sunjong died here in 1926.
	Gyeonghungak (경훈각; 景薰閣; Kyŏnghun'gak; 'Heartwarming Scenery Hall') It was originally a two-story annex building to the rear of Daejojeon used for leisure. Its second floor was called Jinggwangnu (징광루; 澄光樓; Chinggwangnu). It was destroyed by the 1917 fire. In 1920, Gyeongbokgung's Mangyeongjeon was dismantled and recycled to rebuild the hall as a single-story building. During the colonial period, it was significantly used by the former royal family before the 1926 death of Sunjong, with English, Japanese, and piano lessons being held here. It was no longer significantly used by them afterwards. It has a rear garden decorated with flower motifs.

==== East Palace ====
The East Palace (동궁; 東宮; Donggung; Tonggung) was used as the residence, study area, and office of the crown prince, although when it was not occupied by a crown prince it was used for other purposes. Before the Imjin War, it was located outside the confines of Changdeokgung. It was reconstructed after the Imjin War, but after a series of fires, it was reconstructed closer to the rest of the palace, as part of the naejo. Its facilities became shared by both Changdeokgung and Changgyeonggung, and its main gates are located to the east, meaning that it was primarily meant to be accessed from Changgyeonggung. After Gyeongbokgung and that palace's East Palace was reconstructed in the late 19th century, Changdeokgung's East Palace lost its utility. Many of the buildings in this area no longer exist.

Image	Structure
	Seongjeonggak (성정각; 誠正閣; Sŏngjŏnggak) The hall was used for the education of the king and crown prince. It is named for a phrase from the Chinese text Great Learning, which encourages that leaders cultivate their own character and education before ruling. The earliest attestation to the building is in 1705. By the late Joseon period, it became used as a warehouse for the Naeŭiwŏn. Sunjong temporarily stayed here after the 1917 fire. It has an elevated attached building called Huiuru (희우루; 喜雨樓; Hŭiuru), which was named in 1777. That building's name has its origins in a story about when King Sukjong wished for rain in 1690.
	Gwanmulheon (관물헌; 觀物軒; Kwanmurhŏn; 'Observing Matters Hall') A study hall for the education of the king and crown prince. The building has calligraphy on it ("緝熙") that was likely written by a 13-year-old King Gojong in 1864. Sunjong was born here in 1874. It was the stronghold of the Enlightment Party rebels during the 1884 Kapsin Coup; the building was then considered relatively defensible.
	Seunghwaru (승화루; 承華樓; Sŭnghwaru); Samsamwa (삼삼와; 三三窩) (pictured); Chilbunseo (칠분서; 七分序; Ch'ilbunsŏ); Buildings related to Junghuidang, the former crown prince's residence. Junghuidang was relocated to an unknown location in 1891, but these buildings have remained. Seunghwaru is the crown prince's library.

=== Secret Garden ===
The rear garden (후원; 後苑; Huwon; Huwŏn), popularly known as the Secret Garden (비원; 秘院; Biwon; Piwŏn), (Note: The name "Secret Garden" stems from the organization that tended it, which was called "Biwon" (비원; 秘院; Piwŏn; same pronunciation as the word for "Secret Garden"). The earliest attestation to this name is from 1903. When the palace became a public park during the colonial period, this name grew traction with the public.) is located to the north and rear of both Changdeokgung and Changgyeong, and access to it is shared by both palaces. It was a private garden used often for leisure, but also for politics, ceremonies, military training drills, and civil service and military examinations. Leisure activities included hunting, parties, and practicing martial arts. Prior to the 20th century, entrance into the garden was prohibited for most people. A new road was built in the area in 1909. It has a number of artificial ponds and pavilions. It has over 160 species of trees. More than 70 trees in this area are over 300 years old. The garden's highest elevation is in its center, and it slopes to the east and west.

==== Buyongjeong area ====
Image	Structure
	Buyongjeong (부용정; 芙蓉亭; Puyongjŏng; 'Lotus Flower Pavilion') A pavilion on the south side of an artificial pond named Buyongji (부용지; 芙蓉池; Puyongji). The pond was dug in 1707. A building called Taeksujae (택수재; 澤水齋; T'aeksujae) was constructed next to the pond that year. That building was torn down and replaced in 1792. The building was renamed "Buyongjeong" in either 1776 or in 1792, after the reconstruction. King Jeongjo enjoyed fishing here in 1795.
	Yeonghwadang (영화당; 暎花堂; Yŏnghwadang; 'Harmony With Flowers Hall') A pavilion to the east of Juhamnu that was used for leisure. It possibly existed before the Imjin War. It was rebuilt in 1692. It was used for activities like poetry reading and viewing flowers.
	Juhamnu (주합루; 宙合樓; Chuhamnu; 'Place Open to the Universe') A large two-story building on the top of a hill. It was completed on the 26th day, 9th month of 1776. The name "Juhamnu" originally applied only to the second floor; the first floor was named "Kyujanggak" and contained the royal library. In 1781, the library's collection was moved to Imunwon. During the reign of Sunjong, the building was used as a reception hall for Japanese dignitaries. For example, Sunjong hosted Itō Hirobumi here in 1908.
	Sajeonggibigak (사정기비각; 四井記碑閣; Sajŏnggibigak; 'Four Wells Record Stele Pavilion') A pavilion surrounding a stone stele. It is also called Sulseonggak (술성각; 述盛閣; Sulsŏnggak). It memorializes an event that happened in this area. King Sejo commanded four of his nephews to find wells in the area. To Sejo's delight, they located four. Over time and amidst wars, two of the wells were destroyed. In 1690, King Sukjong repaired the remaining two wells and had the stele and pavilion to commemorate the remaining wells.
	Seohyanggak (서향각; 書香閣; Sŏhyanggak; 'Book Fragrance Building') Building used for various purposes over time. It was used to air out books for Kyujanggak, to paint and store royal portraits, and to raise silkworms. It was built in 1776.
	Huiujeong (희우정; 喜雨亭; Hŭiujŏng) A small one-room pavilion. It was first built in 1645 or 1646 as a thatched roof building named Chwihyangjeong (취향정; 醉香亭; Ch'wihyangjŏng). It received its current name in 1690, after King Sukjong wished for rain after a drought at this location and the rain came.
	Cheonseokjeong (천석정; 千石亭; Ch'ŏnsŏkchŏng) A small building to the northeast of Juhamnu. It is also called Jewolgwangpunggwan (제월광풍관; 霽月光風觀; Chewŏlgwangp'unggwan; 'Enjoying the Moonlight and Wind on a Rainy Day').

==== Yeongyeongdang area ====
Image	Structure
	Yeongyeongdang (연경당; 演慶堂; Yŏn'gyŏngdang; 'Extending Congratulations Hall') A residence used for ceremonies and events. It was built in 1828. It consists of an anchae, sarangchae, and kitchen building (반빗간; banbitgan; panbitkan). It does not have dancheong (traditional elaborate paintwork), and more closely resembles a nobleman's residence. This was intentional; while residing here, King Sunjo dressed like a regular nobleman and lived more simply. King Gojong sought refuge here during the 1884 Kapsin Coup, and Emperor Sunjong temporarily resided here after the 1917 fire.
	Seonhyangjae (선향재; 善香齋; Sŏnhyangjae; 'Good Fragrance [From Books] Hall') A study building used to receive guests. The angle of the awning is adjustable to let in more or less sunlight.
	Nongsujeong (농수정; 濃繡亭; Nongsujŏng; 'Embroidered with Colors Pavilion') A small pavilion.

==== Ongnyucheon area ====
The stream Ongnyucheon (옥류천; 玉流川; 'Jade Stream') flows through the north side of the Secret Garden. It was created in 1636. This area was closed for access beginning in 1979, in order to protect the ecology of the area. It was reopened to the public on May 1, 2004 on a reservation only basis. The pavilions Soyojeong, Taegeukjeong, and Cheonguijeong are collectively called the "Three Pavilions of the Royal Grove" (상림삼정; 上林三亭; Sangnimsamjŏng) and have been described as scenic.

Image	Structure
	Soyojeong (소요정; 逍遙亭; Soyojŏng; 'Living Without Worldly Cares Pavilion') A small pavilion used for leisure. It was completed in 1636 and was originally called Tanseojeong (탄서정; 歎逝亭; T'ansŏjŏng). A large rock in front of the pavilion has calligraphy by King Injo (written in 1636) and a poem by King Sukjong. The pavilion was especially loved by a many kings; several wrote poems about it. Injo and his subjects held wine drinking parties here, where cups of wine would be floated down the nearby stream.
	Cheonguijeong (청의정; 淸漪亭; Ch'ŏngŭijŏng; 'Clear Ripples Pavilion') The only extant thatched-roof building in the palace. It was completed in 1636. In accordance with Taoist ideals of heaven being round and the earth square, its roof is round and floor square. In recent years, the agricultural ritual Ch'in'gyŏngnye (친경례; 親耕禮) has been reenacted here. The ritual involves the king participating in agriculture and a banquet in order to appease the agricultural deity Hou Ji.
	Taegeukjeong (태극정; 太極亭; T'aegŭkchŏng) A small pavilion. It is named for the symbol taegeuk, which is also engraved in a nearby cistern. It was completed in 1636 and originally called Unyeongjeong (운영정; 雲影亭; Unyŏngjŏng).
	Chwigyujeong (취규정; 聚奎亭; Ch'wigyujŏng; 'Stars Gather in Kui Xing Pavilion') A pavilion that was completed in either 1640 or 1647. It was repaired in 1688.
	Chwihanjeong (취한정; 翠寒亭; Ch'wihanjŏng; 'Blue Cold Pavilion') A pavilion. Its name comes from the phrase "蒼翠凌寒", meaning "blue pines despise the cold of winter". It was built before 1720.
	Nongsanjeong (농산정; 籠山亭; Nongsanjŏng; 'Mountainside Pavilion') A pavilion. It was used for a variety of purposes over time. It was built in 1636. It has a kitchen that was used to prepare food and drink for the king during his visits.

==== Aeryeonjeong area ====
Image	Structure
	Aeryeonjeong (애련정; 愛蓮亭; Aeryŏnjŏng; 'Love for Lotuses Pavilion') A small pavilion to the north of the pond Aeryeonji (애련지; 愛蓮池; Aeryŏnji). It and its pond were first built in 1692. There is a record of a pavilion of this name being constructed on an islet in the pond; it was rebuilt at its current location at some point.
	Gioheon (기오헌; 寄傲軒; Kiohŏn) A study hall for Uiduhap.
	Uiduhap (의두합; 倚斗閤; ŭiduhap; 'Relying on the Big Dipper Gate') A small hall used as a study room. It is attested to in 1827. It is likely erroneously labeled as "Yeoganjae" (역안재; 易安齋; Yŏganjae) in the 18th-century map Donggwoldo.
	Ungyeonggeo (운경거; 韻磬居; Un'gyŏnggŏ) A storage building and annex to Uiduhap. It has two rooms.

==== Gwallamjeong area ====
Image	Structure
	Gwallamjeong (관람정; 觀纜亭; Kwallamjŏng; 'Watching Sailing Pavilion') A small pavilion uniquely shaped like a fan. It was also known as Seonjajeong (선자정; 扇子亭; Sŏnjajŏng). It has a unique name plaque shaped like a banana leaf. It is located next to the pond Bandoji (반도지; 半島池; Pandoji; 'Peninsula Pond'); that pond is said to resemble the shape of the Korean peninsula. The building was possibly built during the reigns of Gojong or Sunjong.
	Pyeomusa (폄우사; 砭愚榭; P'yŏmusa; 'Vigilance Against Folly Pavilion') A small pavilion near Jondeokjeong. Crown Prince Hyomyeong read books here. Joseon noblemen used to practice walking gracefully here. The building's name literally means "pelt naive person with stones"; this is a metaphor for being cautious.
	Seungjaejeong (승재정; 勝在亭; Sŭngjaejŏng; 'Outstanding Scenery Pavilion') A small pavilion. It was possibly built around the same time as Gwallamjeong (around the reigns of Gojong or Sunjong).
	Jondeokjeong (존덕정; 尊德亭; Chondŏkchŏng) A hexagonal pavilion that is elaborately painted. It was built in 1644 and originally named Yukmyeonjeong (육면정; 六面亭; 'Six-sided Pavilion'). It has a two-tiered roof. Inside is calligraphy by King Jeongjo. It is near the pond Banwolji (반월지; 半月池; Panwŏlchi; 'Half Moon Pond').

==== Other structures ====
Image	Structure
	Gajeongdang (가정당; 嘉靖堂; Kajŏngdang; 'Beautiful Comfortable Hall') It was moved from Deoksugung to this location some time between 1911 and 1921.
	Neungheojeong (능허정; 凌虛亭; Nŭnghŏjŏng) A small pavilion. It was first built in 1691. A number of kings have written poems about this pavilion. It is not accessible to the general public; visitors must be guided to the pavilion on an organized tour.
	Cheongsimjeong (청심정; 淸心亭; Ch'ŏngsimjŏng) A small pavilion first built in 1688.

=== Nakseonjae area ===
Image	Structure
	Nakseonjae (낙선재; 樂善齋; Naksŏnjae) A hall used for various purposes over time. It has a relatively austere design, reflecting the Taoist frugality valued by King Heonjong. It was built in 1847, on the former site of the building Nakseondang (낙선당; 樂善堂; Naksŏndang). Sunjong temporarily resided here after the 1917 fire. Soon afterwards, its interior was remodeled to be in a Japanese style. Princess Euimin resided here from 1963 return to Korea until her death in 1989. Yi Un died here on May 1, 1970. Its interior was reverted to its pre-colonial state in 1997.
	Seokbokheon (석복헌; 錫福軒; Sŏkpokhŏn; 'Bestowing Blessings Hall') A residence for palace women. It was built in 1848. After Emperor Sunjong's death, Empress Sunjeonghyo continued to reside in this complex. She vacated it in 1950, during the Korean War, and only returned to it in 1960. She died in this hall in February 1966.
	Sugangjae (수강재; 壽康齋; Sugangjae; 'Longevity Hall') Originally built as a study for the king. Used as a residence for royal women. It was built in 1785. It named for and located on the former site of Suganggung (which developed into Changgyeonggung). It was renovated in 1847. It was the residence of Queen Sunwon. Princess Deokhye resided here from her 1962 return to Korea until her 1989 death.
	Sangnyangjeong (상량정; 上凉亭; Sangnyangjŏng; 'Rising to a Cool Place Pavilion') A hexagonal pavilion with an intricately painted ceiling decorated with auspicious symbols. It was originally named Pyeongwollu (평원루; 平遠樓; P'yŏngwŏllu; 'Peace With Far Lands Building').
	Hanjeongdang (한정당; 閒靜堂; Hanjŏngdang; 'Quiet and Peaceful Hall') An annex to Seokbokheon. It was built some time after 1917. It has glass windows.
	Chwiunjeong (취운정; 翠雲亭; Ch'wiunjŏng) Built in 1686 or 1640, it is the oldest extant building in the Nakseonjae complex. It has ondol heated floors.

=== Old Seonwonjeon area ===
Image	Structure
	Seonwonjeon (선원전; 璿源殿; Sŏnwŏnjŏn) A royal ritual portrait hall used for ancestor worship. Portraits of past kings were enshrined here. It is also called Jinjeon (진전; 眞殿; chinjŏn). A hall with the same name and function used to exist in Gyeongbokgung, but was destroyed along with that palace in 1592, during the Imjin War. Changdeokgung's Seonwonjeon was built in 1695 and dedicated to the Chinese Wanli Emperor, in thanks for China's support during the Imjin War. It was renovated in 1725. The spirit tablets of the first and last Chinese Ming emperors were enshrined here in 1749. It was expanded in 1754, 1778, 1846, 1851, and 1900. It was vacated during the early colonial period, and the new Seonwonjeon was completed in 1921. The portraits were moved there.
	Uipunggak (의풍각; 儀豊閣; ŭip'unggak) A warehouse building. It was constructed during the colonial period to store the possessions of the royal household. The area it now occupies was formerly used for facilities for queen dowagers.
	Yangjidang (양지당; 養志堂; Yangjidang) Where the king would stay before rituals at Seonwonjeon. It was demolished some time between 1911 and 1921.
	Yeonguisa (영의사; 永依舍; Yŏngŭisa) A building possibly used for the storage of funerary materials. It was demolished some time between 1911 and 1921.

=== New Seonwonjeon area ===
Image	Structure
	New Seonwonjeon (신선원전; 新璿源殿; Sinsŏnwŏnjŏn) A royal portrait hall completed in 1921. It took over the function of the previous Seonwonjeon. It is located far north and separate from the rest of the palace. Lee et al. have argued the hall was moved further away from the rest of the palace in order to deemphasize the former royal family's ritual connection to their royal ancestors. Previously, the building Daebodan occupied this site, but was demolished some time between 1911 and 1921. The New Seonwonjeon is the last portrait hall to be constructed in Korea. Most of the portraits stored here were destroyed in the 1954 Busan Yongdusan fires.
	Uirojeon (의로전; 懿老殿; ŭirojŏn) An annex building to the New Seonwonjeon. It is believed that this building is actually Uihyojeon (의효전; 懿孝殿; ŭihyojŏn), a building that was moved from Gyeongbokgung to Gyeongungung in 1904, then to Changdeokgung in 1921. It was then used to hold spirit tablets.
	Jaesil (재실; 齋室; Chaesil) An office building and annex to the New Seonwonjeon.

=== Other ===
Image	Structure
	Bigungdang (비궁당; 匪躬堂; Pigungdang) A guesthouse and hall for meetings. Also called Bincheong (빈청; 賓廳; Pinch'ŏng) or Eochago (어차고; Ŏch'ago). It has eight rooms. In 1910, it began to be used as a garage. Several of Sunjong and his wife's vehicles were stored in the building after the liberation. The building and cars were opened to public display in 2001; the cars were moved to the National Palace Museum in 2007. In 2010, the building began operating as a cafe called Donggwolmaru (동궐마루). The use of the building as a cafe has been criticized by several politicians and journalists. The Changdeokgung Palace Management Office responded that the building had been replaced during the colonial period and was not an original, and was thus not disrespecting the legacy of the palace.
	Mongdapjeong (몽답정; 夢踏亭; Mongdapchŏng; 'Dream Walking Pavilion') A pavilion. Named for a dream King Sukjong had about the pavilion.
	Gwaegungjeong (괘궁정; 挂弓亭; Kwaegungjŏng; 'Firing an Arrow Pavilion') A pavilion used for practicing archery.

==== Geumcheon and Geumcheongyo ====
Geumcheon (금천; 錦川; 'silky water') is the kŭmch'ŏn (금천; 禁川; different Hanja but same Hangul spelling) that previously flowed through the palace. Water no longer flows through the stream.

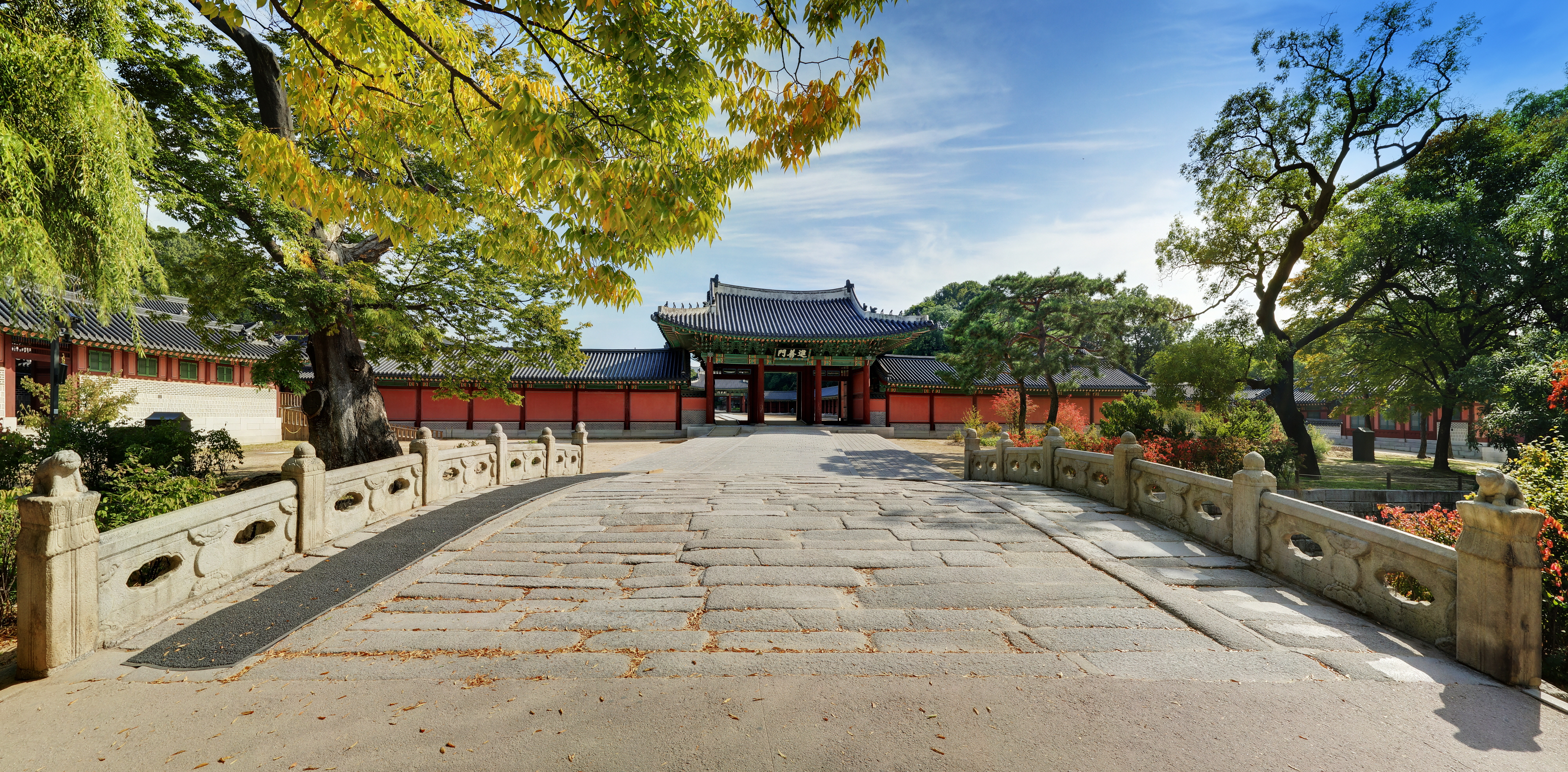
Geumcheongyo (2012)

The Changdeokgung Geumcheongyo (창덕궁 금천교; 昌德宮 錦川橋; Ch'angdŏkkung kŭmch'ŏn'gyo) is a kŭmch'ŏn'gyo (bridge over a kŭmch'ŏn) that crosses over Geumcheon. It was completed on the 18th day, 3rd month of 1411 and is the oldest extant kŭmch'ŏn'gyŏ of all Joseon palaces. It has two arches. It has a number of stone statues of mythological creatures. On its northern baluster is a statue of the Black Turtle-Snake, mythological guardian of the north. The statue on the south baluster is the Bai Ze, guardian of the south. On each of the bridge's four newels is a statue of a Xiezhi. The bridge also has engravings of a dokkaebi (Korean goblin) called nati on both sides.

== Former landmarks ==
=== Naejo ===
==== Naejŏn ====
Jinggwangnu (징광루; 澄光樓; Chinggwangnu) was a two-story pavilion to the northeast of Daejojeon. It was built in 1647 using materials from In'gyŏnggung. It had blue roof tiles. It was destroyed in the 1917 fire. Gyeonghungak was rebuilt in Jinggwangnu's former location in 1920.

Yeonghwidang (영휘당; 永輝堂; Yŏnghwidang) was a building to the west of Gyeonghungak. It was closely linked with another building Okhwadang. It was destroyed by fire in 1833 and restored. It was destroyed in the 1917 fire and never rebuilt.

Yeonyangnu (연양루; 延陽樓; Yŏnyangnu) was a small pavilion to the southeast of Yeonghwidang. It burned down in 1833, was restored, then was again burned down in 1917 and never rebuilt.

Okhwadang (옥화당; 玉華堂) was a building to the west of Yeonghwidang. It was named in 1461. It was destroyed by fire in 1833 and restored. It was destroyed in the 1917 fire and never rebuilt.

Bogyeongdang (보경당; 寶慶堂; Pogyŏngdang) was the living quarters of Sukbin Choe and Subin Park, and the birthplace of King Yeongjo. It was named in 1461. After being destroyed in 1592 during the Imjin War, it was rebuilt in 1647.

Sodeokdang (소덕당; 昭德堂; Sodŏktang) was a northern annex to Seonjeongjeon. It received the name "Sodeokdang" in 1461. It is attested to in 1565 but is not depicted in the 19th-century map Donggwoldo.

Taehwadang (태화당; 泰和堂; T'aehwadang) was a building to the north of Seonjeongjeon. It is not known when it was built; it is attested to in 1647.

Jaedeokdang (재덕당; 才德堂; Chaedŏktang) was a building to the north of Seonjeongjeon and to the east of Taehwadang.

==== East Palace ====
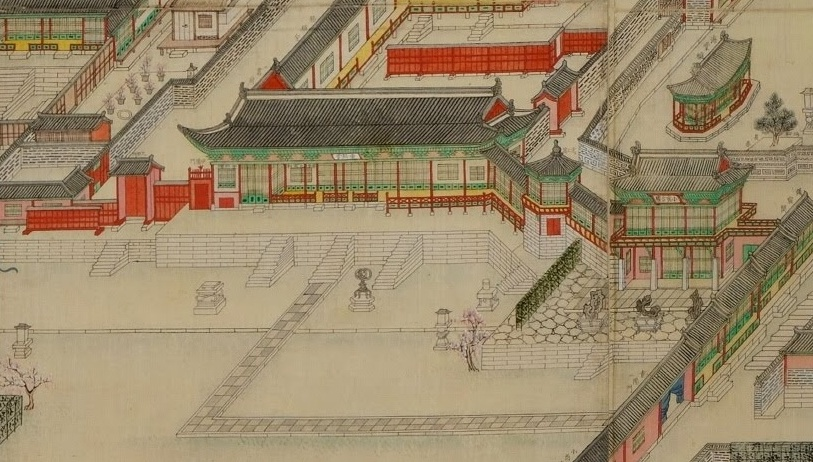
Junghuidang (center), as depicted in Donggwoldo (c. 1826 – c. 1830)

Junghuidang (중희당; 重熙堂; Chunghŭidang; 'Continuously Shining Hall') was the East Palace's main hall and the residence of the crown prince. It was originally built in 1782, likely for Crown Prince Munhyo. It was meant to replace older facilities in the East Palace that had previously burned down. After Munhyo's premature death, it was used as a council hall. It was relocated to an unknown location in 1891; its former location has remained empty ever since. A number of its former buildings still stand, including the crown prince's library Seunghwaru (승화루; 承華樓; Sŭnghwaru), the gazebo Samsamwa (삼삼와; 三三窩), and the building Chilbunseo (칠분서; 七分序; Ch'ilbunsŏ).

=== Old East Palace ===
Simindang (시민당; 時敏堂), Jeoseungjeon, and Nakseondang (later replaced by Nakseonjae) were together considered the East Palace. Simindang was destroyed by fire in 1780. Rather than rebuild Simindang and the rest of the East Palace, Junghuidang was built in what became the current East Palace area inside the naejŏ.

=== Old Seonwonjeon area ===
Mansujeon (만수전; 萬壽殿; Mansujŏn) was a building behind Injeongjeon. It was completed on the 2nd day, 4th month of 1657. It had an annex building Chunhwijeon (춘휘전; 春暉殿; Ch'unhwijŏn) that was completed that same year. Mansujeon burned down on the 2nd day, 9th month of 1687. In its place was later built Gyeongbokjeon (경복전; 景福殿; Kyŏngbokchŏn). Chunhwijeon was then converted to a portrait hall. In 1695, it was renamed "Seonwonjeon" and became a part of the Seonwonjeon complex. Queen Jeongsun died here in 1805. Gyeongbokjeon burned down on the 24th day, 8th month of 1824.

Yeongmodang (영모당; 永慕堂; Yŏngmodang) was a hall. It was a residence of Queen Jeongsun.

=== New Seonwonjeon area ===
Daebodan (대보단; 大報壇; Taebodan) was a building constructed to hold rituals honoring the Chinese Ming Emperor, in thanks for their assistance during the Imjin War. It was first built in 1704 and was significantly renovated in 1749. The building was demolished to make way for the New Seonwonjeon some time between 1911 and 1921.

=== Other buildings ===
Sujeongjeon (수정전; 壽靜殿; Sujŏngjŏn). It was originally called Sujeongdang (수정당; 壽靜堂; Sujŏngdang) and received its final name in 1794. Repairs were completed on the 8th day, 12th month of 1794. In 1796, the crown prince began to reside here. Queen Jeongsun and Queen Hyoui resided here. A fire broke out here on the 13th day, 12th month of 1813, but the main building was mostly undamaged. Hyoui died here in the 3rd month of 1821. It was repaired in the 3rd month of 1881 and renamed to Hamnyeongjeon (함녕전; 咸寧殿; Hamnyŏngjŏn; different from the building of the same name in Deoksugung). It was destroyed by fire only months later, on the 7th day, 11th month of 1881. It was nearly finished being rebuilt when its progress was interrupted by the 1895 assassination of Empress Myeongseong. Hamnyeongjeon was then relocated to Gyeongbokgung, where it became the building Jibokjae.

Jibokjae and Hyeopgildang. They were originally built as annex buildings to Sujeongjeon in 1881. They were spared by the Hamnyeongjeon fire that year. In 1891, they were disassembled and moved to Gyeongbokgung.Jipsangjeon (집상전; 集祥殿; Chipsangjŏn) was a residence hall. It was built in either 1647 or 1667, originally for Queen Inseon.

Cheonhangak (천한각; 天翰閣; Ch'ŏnhan'gak) was a building. It was previously named Gyeongsojae (경소재; 敬所齋; Kyŏngsojae) but was renamed in 1694. It was possibly located to the north of Jipsangjeon.

Maewoljeong (매월정; 梅月亭; Maewŏlchŏng) was a pavilion to the north of Jipsangjeon. It was demolished when Jipsangjeon was constructed.

Yeonhwadang (연화당; 讌和堂; Yŏnhwadang) was a building to the east of Seonjeongjeon. It is attested to existing in 1647 and 1784.

Jangchunheon (장춘헌; 長春軒; Changch'unhŏn) was a building. It is presumed the building was used as a living quarters for concubines. Queen Danui died here in 1718. The building was gone by the 1790–1834 reign of King Sunjo.

== Additional reading ==
- 창덕궁 육백년 (in Korean). Cultural Heritage Administration Changdeokgung Palace Management Office. 2005-11-20. ISBN 9788981245290.
- Chang, Pil-Gu; Jeon, Bong-Hee (December 2013). 고종 장례 기간 신선원전의 조성과 덕수궁·창덕궁 궁역의 변화 [Construction of Sin-Seonwonjeon Shrine and Transformation of Deoksoogung and Changdeokgung Palaces' Area During King Kojong's Funeral]. Journal of the Architectural Institute of Korea – Planning & Design (in Korean). 29 (12): 197–208. ISSN 1226-9093 – via DBpia.
