= Jibokjae =

Building in Gyeongbokgung, Seoul, South Korea

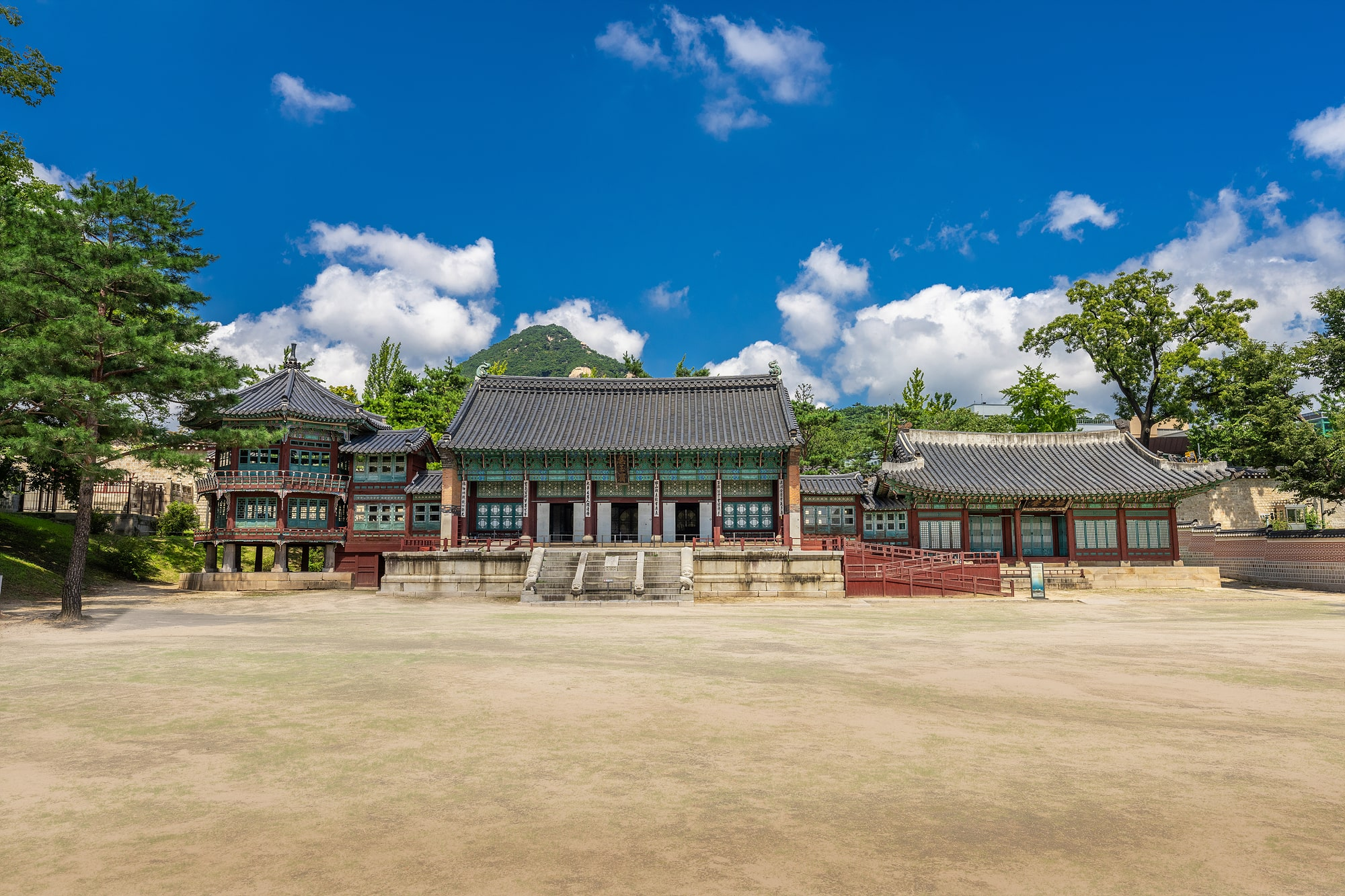
- From left to right, Parujeong, Jibokjae, and Hyeopgildang
- Interactive map of the Jibokjae area

General information
- Location: Gyeongbokgung, Seoul, South Korea
- Coordinates: 37°35′4″N 126°58′33.8″E

Korean name
- Hangul: 집옥재
- Hanja: 集玉齋
- RR: Jibokjae
- MR: Chibokchae

Jibokjae (Korean: 집옥재; Hanja: 集玉齋) is a building in the palace Gyeongbokgung in Seoul, South Korea. It is connected with two other buildings; to its west is Parujeong (팔우정; 八隅亭; P'arujŏng) and to its east is Hyeopgildang (협길당; 協吉堂; Hyŏpkiltang).

== Description ==
The three buildings are in the back of the palace, to the east of the palace's north gate Sinmumun. They are connected by corridors. Together, the buildings were used as King Gojong's library and study. Jibokjae was used to hold royal portraits and to meet foreign envoys. Of the three, Hyeopgildang is the only building with ondol heated floors. It was considered the best building of the three for using as a residence. Jibokjae is uniquely built in a Chinese-Western style; its signboard was written in the style of Chinese artist Mi Fu. A list of books that used to be held in Jibokjae is now stored at the Kyujanggak Institute for Korean Studies. In April 2016, Jibokjae reopened as a small library.

== History ==
These buildings are post-Imjin War additions to the palace. Jibokjae and Hyeopgildang were originally buildings of another palace Changdeokgung that were completed in 1881. They were then called Hamnyeongjeon. They were relocated and rebuilt in Gyeongbokgung from 1891 to 1893. Parujeong is an original building that was built in 1891, while the other two were being rebuilt in Gyeongbokgung. It was used for book storage. The three buildings have remained to the present.
