= Donhwamun =

Gate of Changdeokgung in Seoul, South Korea

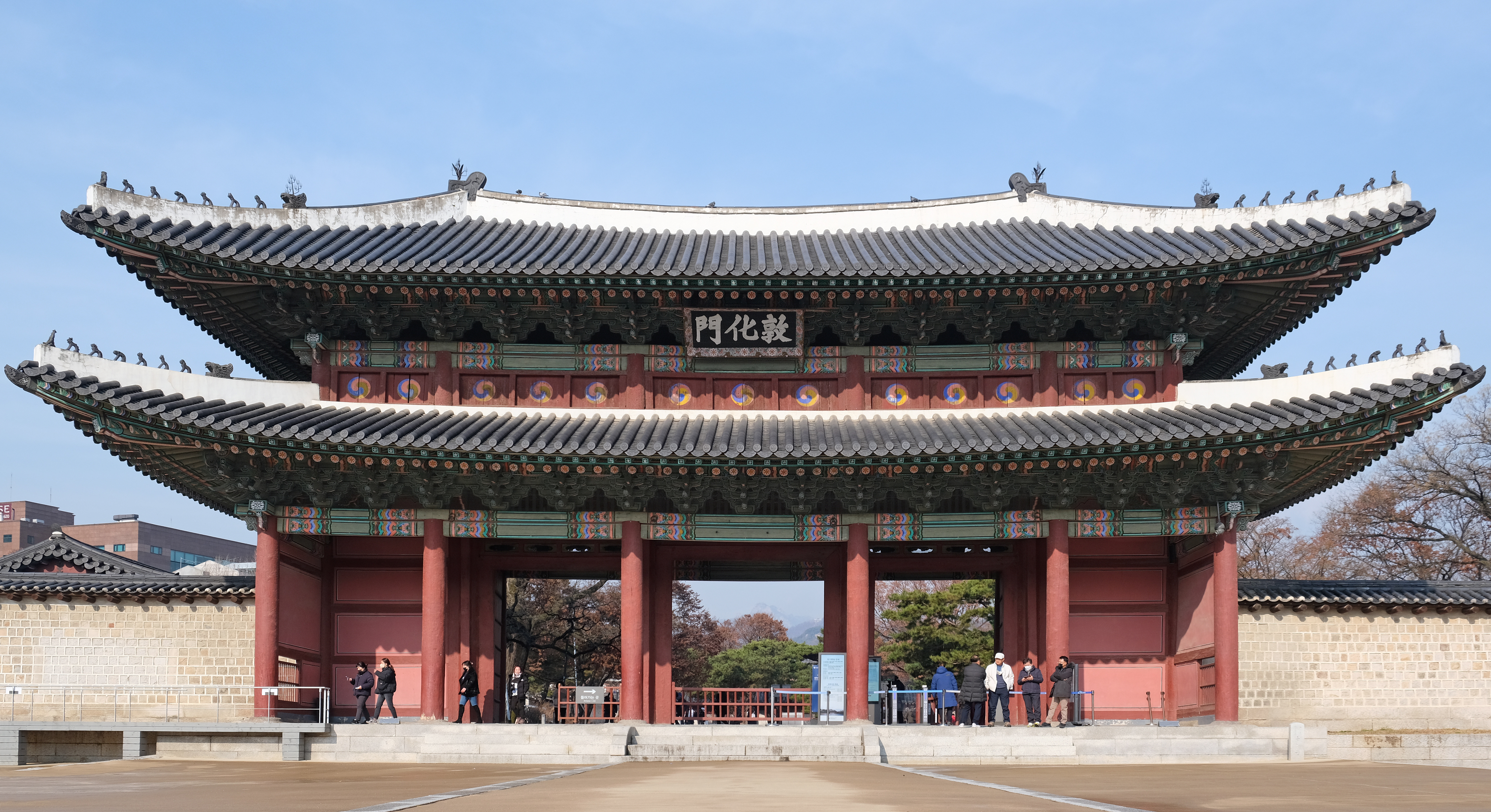
- The gate (2022)
- Interactive map of the Donhwamun area

General information
- Location: Changdeokgung, Seoul, South Korea
- Coordinates: 37.577°N 126.989°E
- Completed: 22nd day, 5th month of 1412

Design and construction
- Designations

Treasures of South Korea
- Official name: Donhwamun Gate of Changdeokgung Palace
- Designated: 1963-01-21

Korean name
- Hangul: 돈화문
- Hanja: 敦化門
- RR: Donhwamun
- MR: Tonhwamun

Donhwamun (Korean: 돈화문; Hanja: 敦化門) is the main and south gate of the palace Changdeokgung in Seoul, South Korea. It is a designated Treasure of South Korea and the oldest extant gate of all Joseon palaces. It was completed in 1412, destroyed in 1592, rebuilt in 1607 or 1608, and has since survived to the present.

== Name ==
It is named after a phrase "大德敦化" from the Chinese text Doctrine of the Mean. That phrase has been interpreted in this context as "to govern with a warm heart and edify with virtue".

== History ==
It was completed on the 22nd day, 5th month of 1412. In 1413, a bill was hung at the gate. It was renovated in 1418. It was destroyed in 1592, during the Imjin War. It was reconstructed in 1607 or 1608. There are no records of it being destroyed thereafter, although it was restored or remodeled on a number of occasions. There is a wŏltae (월대; elevated platform) in front of the gate. The wŏltae was demolished in the early 1900s to accommodate the entry of royal vehicles. The wŏltae and gate were restored to their pre-colonial states in 1997. The gate has a second floor that contains a bell and drum used to signal emergencies. The head of a rebel leader was hung at the gate in 1728.
