= Huijeongdang =

Building in Changdeokgung, Seoul, South Korea

- Huijeongdang (2026)

General information
- Location: Changdeokgung, Seoul, South Korea
- Coordinates: 37.579°N 126.992°E

Design and construction
- Designations

Treasures of South Korea
- Official name: Huijeongdang Hall of Changdeokgung Palace
- Designated: 1985-01-08

Korean name
- Hangul: 희정당
- Hanja: 熙政堂
- Lit.: Peaceful Governance Hall
- RR: Huijeongdang
- MR: Hŭijŏngdang

Huijeongdang (Korean: 희정당; Hanja: 熙政堂; lit. 'Peaceful Governance Hall') is a major hall in the palace Changdeokgung in Seoul, South Korea. It is a designated Treasure of South Korea.

== History ==
It was originally built as a bed chamber for the king named Sumundang (수문당; 修文堂). It caught fire in the 6th month of 1492. In the 12th month of that year it was ordered to be repaired and was given its current name. After being destroyed in 1592 during the Imjin War, it was rebuilt in 1608. It was destroyed during the 1623 Injo coup. It was rebuilt in 1647, using materials from the building Hwajŏngdang (화정당; 和政堂; Hwajeongdang), which was part of another palace In'gyŏnggung. Huijeongdang burned down on the 17th day, 10th month of 1833 and was repaired by the 9th month of 1834. It was destroyed in the 1917 fire and rebuilt by 1920 using materials from Gyeongbokgung's Gangnyeongjeon. It was rebuilt larger and in a different style to its previous form. Western furniture was brought in. It was used as a council hall during the final Korean monarch Emperor Sunjong's reign (r. 1907–1910).

== See also ==
- Gyeongbokgung
  - List of landmarks in Gyeongbokgung
  - History of Gyeongbokgung
