= Injeongmun =

Gate in Changdeokgung, Seoul, South Korea

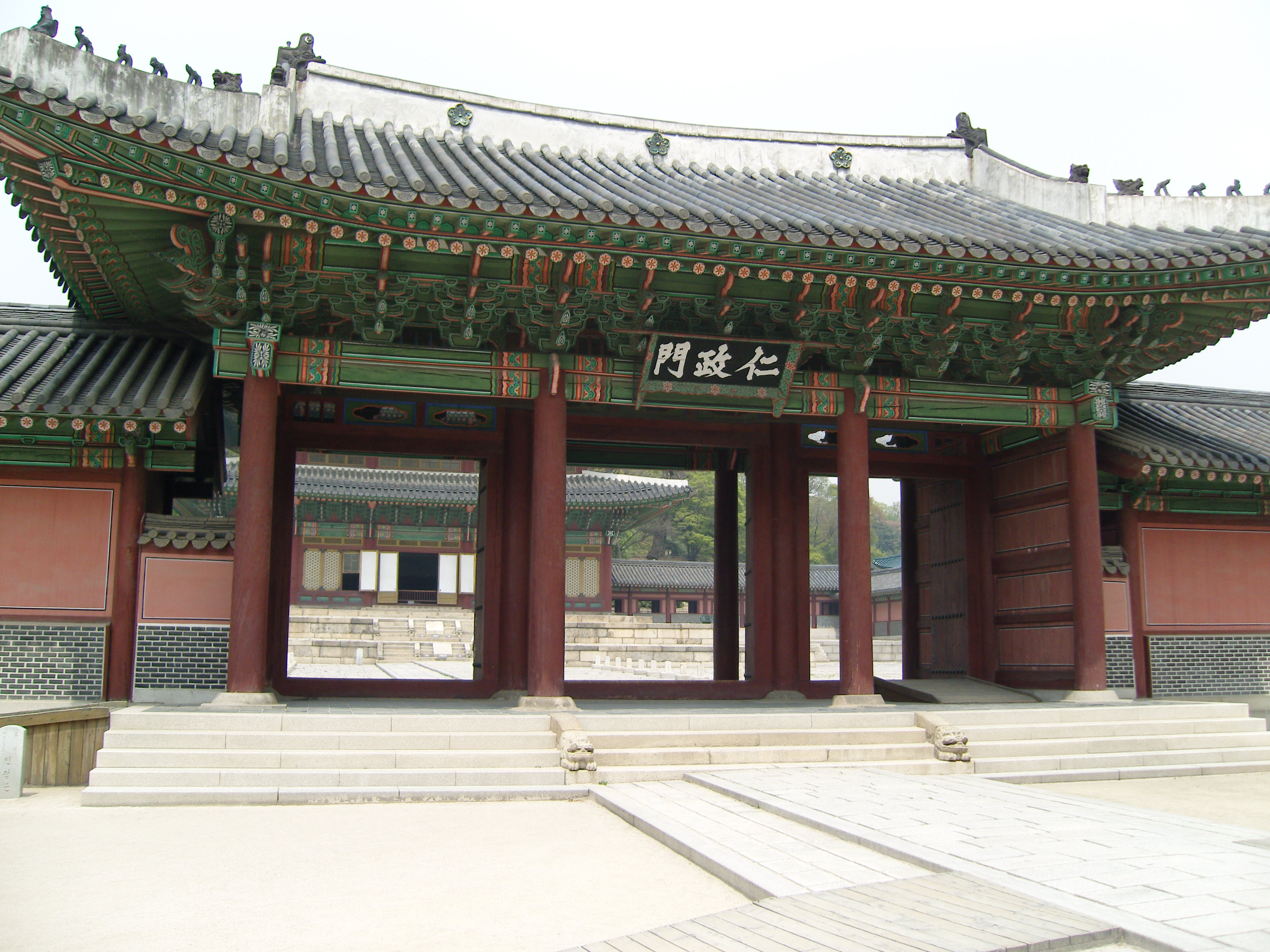
- The gate (2008)
- Interactive map of the Injeongmun area

General information
- Location: Changdeokgung, Seoul, South Korea
- Coordinates: 37.578°N 126.991°E
- Completed: Mid-1400s

Design and construction
- Designations

Treasures of South Korea
- Official name: Injeongmun Gate of Changdeokgung Palace
- Designated: 1985-01-08

Korean name
- Hangul: 인정문
- Hanja: 仁政門
- RR: Injeongmun
- MR: Injŏngmun

Injeongmun (Korean: 인정문; Hanja: 仁政門) is a gate inside the palace Changdeokgung in Seoul, South Korea. It is the front gate to the palace's main building Injeongjeon. Injeongmun is a designated Treasure of South Korea. It has corridors to its left and right that eventually angle and form a trapezoid.

== History ==
There is no record of when it was built, but it is presumed to have been completed around the time of the palace's founding (in the first decade of the 1400s). Its corridors were constructed from 1418 to 1419; King Sejong (r. 1418–1450) was so displeased with them that he ordered them demolished and had the construction supervisor imprisoned. The corridors were rebuilt afterwards.

The gate was destroyed in 1592 during the Imjin War and rebuilt during the reign of King Gwanghaegun (r. 1608–1623). Its corridors were rebuilt in 1647. It burned down in 1744 and was rebuilt in 1745; this version has persisted until the present. The gate and corridors were restored to their pre-colonial states from 1992 to 1996.
