= Daejojeon =

Hall in Changdeokgung, Seoul, South Korea

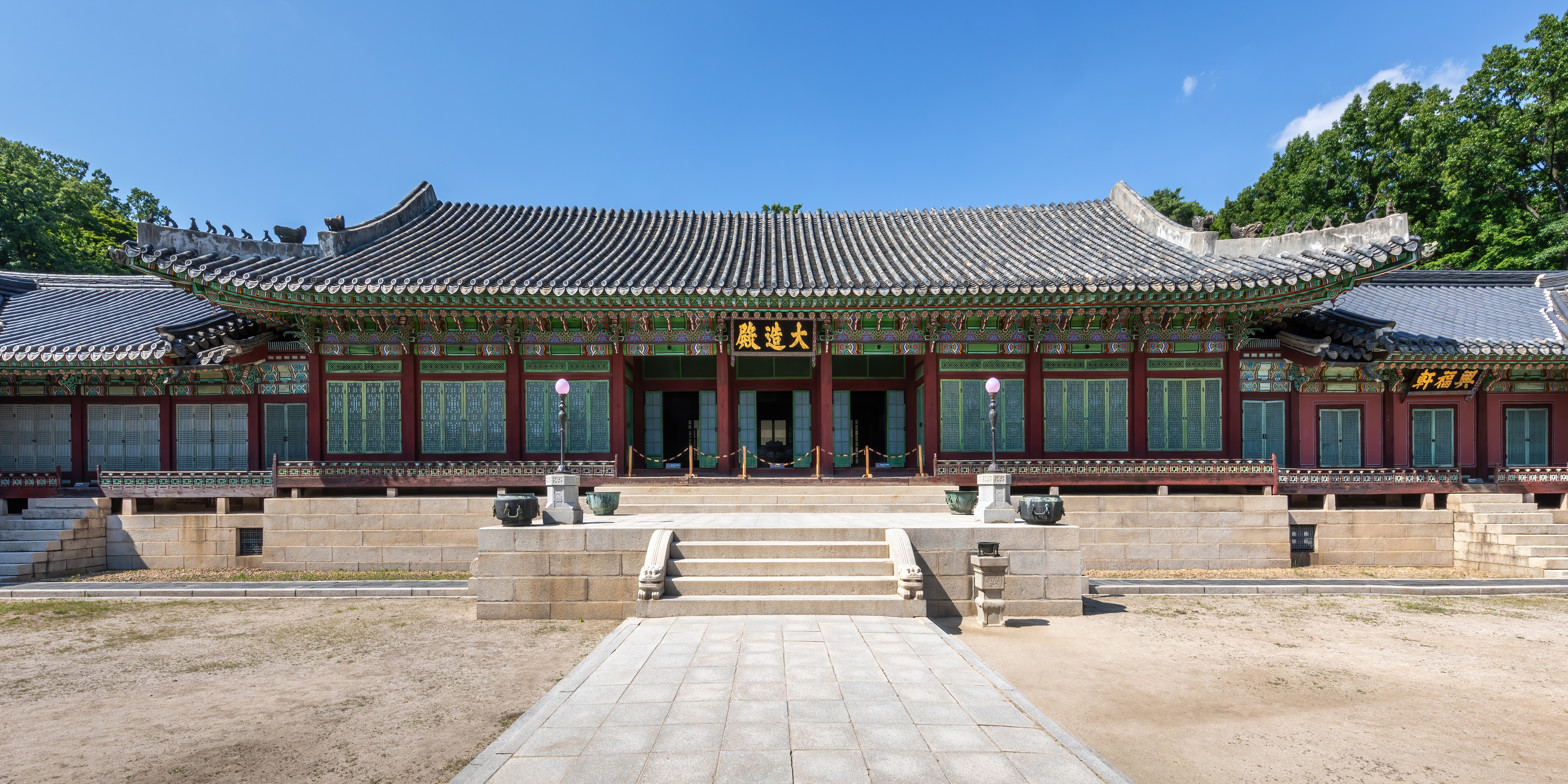
- The building (2024)
- Interactive map of the Daejojeon area

General information
- Location: Changdeokgung, Seoul, South Korea
- Coordinates: 37.580°N 126.992°E

Design and construction
- Designations

Treasures of South Korea
- Official name: Daejojeon Hall of Changdeokgung Palace
- Designated: 1985-01-08

Korean name
- Hangul: 대조전
- Hanja: 大造殿
- Lit.: Achieving Greatness Hall
- RR: Daejojeon
- MR: Taejojŏn

Daejojeon (Korean: 대조전; Hanja: 大造殿; lit. 'Achieving Greatness Hall') is a major hall in the palace Changdeokgung in Seoul, South Korea. It was used as the main living quarters for the king and office of the queen. It is now a designated Treasure of South Korea.

== History ==
It was possibly originally named Yanguijeon (양의전; 兩儀殿; Yangŭijŏn) in 1461, but began to go by "Daejojeon" shortly afterwards. (Note: There is a record of a building with the same function as Daejojeon being named in 1461. However, the name no longer appears in later records, and "Daejojeon" appears instead. Thus, Lee et al. argue it is possible Yanguijeon and Daejojeon were two separate halls.) King Seongjong died here in 1495. After being destroyed in 1592 during the Imjin War, it was rebuilt in 1608 and destroyed in 1623 during the Injo coup. It was rebuilt in 1647, using materials from the building Kyŏngsujŏn (경수전; 慶壽殿; Gyeongsujeon) from the palace In'gyŏnggung. It burned down on the 17th day, 10th month of 1833 and was repaired by the 9th month of 1834. It has an attached hall, Heungbokheon (흥복헌; 興福軒; Hŭngbokhŏn). That hall was where the final cabinet meeting was held before Korea's 1910 annexation. This is where the 1917 fire began; the fire completely destroyed Daejojeon and its annex buildings. Gyeongbokgung's building Gyotaejeon was recycled to reconstruct Daejojeon and its annexes Heungbokheon and Yunggyeongheon (융경헌; 隆慶軒; Yunggyŏnghŏn). It was completed by 1920. The final Korean monarch Emperor Sunjong (r. 1907–1910) died here in 1926. Near the hall is a small palace kitchen (수라간; 水剌間; surakan) that was constructed during Sunjong's reign. It has modern Western facilities, like a sink and oven.

== See also ==
- Gyeongbokgung
  - List of landmarks in Gyeongbokgung
  - History of Gyeongbokgung
