= Nurimedia =

South Korean library resource company

Nurimedia 누리미디어
- Industry: Digital library
- Founded: 1997
- Headquarters: 4th Floor, 63, Seonyu-ro, Yeongdeungpo-gu, Seoul, South Korea
- Key people: Choi, Soonil
- Products: DBpia, KRpia, BookRail, BaeumNet
- Number of employees: 80
- Website: www.nurimedia.co.kr

Nurimedia (Korean: 누리미디어) is a South Korean company headquartered in Seoul, which offers academic library resources to customers in college, university, private enterprise and government markets. Its products include fee-based online research services DBpia, with over 3,400 Korean scholarly journals and a partnership with the Korea Institute of Science and Technology Information (KISTI) of science and technology academic papers; KRpia, with primary resources on Korean studies with 127 full-text databases; BookRail e-book service and BauemNet e-learning courses.

== History ==
The company was founded in 1997, incorporated as a limited company Nurimedia Co., Ltd. and a registered software company in 1998, and enrolled as a venture Company in 1999.

In the beginning years, they announced their ambition of creating a definitive Korean studies database. Some of their first published Korean classical literary works, in digital form, included Goryeosa, The History of Balhae, Tripitaka Koreana, Samguk sagi and Samguk yusa. Research scholars, also noted the company as having introduced, in 1998–1999, a few historical works from North Korea, through China, which they published on CD-ROM.

At the end of the twentieth century, a need had developed in the area of Korean studies, as academic researchers showed an increased interest in information retrieval, the internet and related technology. The Korean government's policy was "to make the nation the best place in the world for IT services," and the company was one of seven mainstream companies, in South Korea, learning to manage vast amounts of digitalized information related to Korean studies, and just one of two digitalizing full-text articles of South Korean academic journals. It was a time when the quality and quantity of their digital content experienced rapid growth; initially providing full text in PDF, and by 2006, their databases were offering multimedia functions such as sound, graphics and video.

In 1997, Bookrail was developed, based on local technology, and became the search program for DBpia. By 2000, it had been distributed to some sixty institutions in Korea.

In April 2000, DBpia, their web-based academic database that enables searching and reading of information in original texts began operations, in cooperation with Korea's largest bookseller, Kyobo Book Centre. Some fifty domestic institutions signed on, including the University of Seoul, Yonsei University, Hanyang University, Kyung Hee University, Chung-Ang University, and Konkuk University.

In 2003, they were one of two companies that participated in a free trial period for North American university libraries arranged by The Council on East Asian Libraries Committee on Korean Materials (CKM). A learning experience for vendors and libraries, the database companies were praised for their extensive coverage of Korean academic journals, but presented with issues they needed to work on, issues of copyright, pricing and a more secure backup file availability like mirror sites. As the company expanded their market, they continued to offer free trial periods.

In the following years they added software, database and business certificates and in 2015 were listed as a supported content provider (DBpia only) of a subscription monitoring service, along with other major companies; and had mobile apps for their products.

Reported sales in 2014 were 98 billion won (87.7 million USD), with 80 employees.

== Products ==
=== DBpia ===
The integrated database includes 1,138 of Korean scholarly journals with more than 890,000 articles in full text. There are also, some 55,997 items exported from the Korea Knowledge Portal. In 2013, Nurimedia signed an agreement with KISTI to add 700,000 science and technology academic papers to their database.

Journal titles are divided into eleven topical categories: society, literature, economics and business, medical science, humanities, theology, law and administration, arts, engineering, natural science, and education. All the back issues of each journal title are available and title, author, keyword, journal title and publisher searchable.

Authenticated users can save files and be alerted by e-mail when designated publishers release new articles. Languages available are English, Korean, Japanese and Russian, and the database also covers some English materials published in Korea.

A U.S. university advised users it was similar to using the English digital library JSTOR.

=== KRpia ===
The Korean language database covers 600 publications in such fields as literature, economics, business, theology, law, administration, arts, engineering and natural science. It is a primary source reference database divided into ten topics and one hundred forty subcategories and includes special dictionaries, archival and historical resources, biographical sources, and other reference materials related to Korean history, literature, civilization and medicine.

It contains image files of original text in Classical Chinese with the translated version searchable in Korean. It links to and provides an integrated search capability for the Institute for the Translation of Korean Classics, Korean Studies Advancement Center (a part of the free online database Korea History Online) and the Chonnam University Museum. The Joseon law codes (Gyeongguk daejeon) are also available.

The search can be extended to include the DBpia and there is an integrated search among different dictionaries. Authenticated users can keep records in their personal folders. In addition to Old Korean, foreign language fonts are available in Chinese, Japanese, and Russian.

=== BookRail ===
The service is under copyright contracts with several publishers and copyright holders including Munji Publishing and the publishing department of Seoul National University. Their e-book service includes e-books selected and honored by Ministry of Culture, Sports and Tourism.

=== DBpia ONE ===
DBpia ONE is the cloud-based manuscript submission and peer-review tracking system. This product make the submission and peer-review process efficiently for authors, editors and reviewers.

=== BaeumNet ===
The practical e-learning lecture courses cover nine different fields required by college students, examinees, job candidates, and housewives; "Job Searching and Work Life", "Culture and Arts", "Economics, Management and Business", "Liberal Arts", "Multicultural Contents", "Self-Development and Self-Management", "Computer and Internet", "Health and Hobbies", and "Law School".

== Partnerships and subscribers ==
By May 2004, the Asia Library of the University of Michigan, established in 1948, which maintains one of the U.S. largest collections of Chinese, Japanese, and Korean language resources in all formats, had "purchased several large databases containing full text articles from a broad coverage of primary resources on Korean Studies," including full text databases developed by Nurimedia, Korean Studies Inc., and Dongbang Media.

In 2005, the U.S. Library of Congress added database subscriptions to designated "important and under-represented areas" including three Korean databases, KRpia, DBpia and Chosun Ilbo Archive.

In 2007, the company partnered with web based international company RefWorks which enabled researchers with their accounts to directly export search results with a simple procedure.

In June 2013, the U.S. based non-profit global cooperative Online Computer Library Center, Inc. (OCLC) announced the addition of major global publishers to WorldCat, including three databases about Korean culture, history and education, DBpia, KRpia and Book Rail, representing a combined 80 million journal articles, 8,000 e-books and 1.3 million academic theses/papers. In October 2014, Nurimedia was one of four Korean participating publishers listed in the OCLC Asia-Pacific global data network, along with KISTI, Korea and Korean Studies Information (KSI) and Korean Studies Institute Korea.

In 2013, ProQuest, a U.S. based, global information and data provider, indexed additional DBpia, KRpia, and BookRail collections, bringing the total to nearly 1,500,000 records of book and journal content.

In South Korea, the company has agreements with government agencies, libraries, and academic institutions, including the National Library of Korea and KISTI to make government and academic information available.

Globally, the company has subscribers in eighty universities and institutions in twelve countries, with yearly increases. The largest global subscriber is the United States, with forty-one colleges and universities, including private universities, Columbia University, Cornell University, Dartmouth College, Harvard University, University of Pennsylvania, Princeton University, Yale University; and public universities, University of California, Los Angeles, University of Michigan, University of North Carolina at Chapel Hill, University of Texas at Austin, University of Virginia, University of Washington, University of Wisconsin–Madison.

== Korean studies support program ==
In 2013, the company placed second on a list of eight databases supported by the Korea Foundation (KF) grant, with forty-one institutions receiving the grant for subscriptions to DBpia and/or KRpia. The KF "Support for Korean Studies e-Resources" program provides grants to selected universities to assist with the payment of the user fees required to access online Korean Studies resources, including these two company products.

== Awards ==
The company and its products have received several awards, including the 2006 National Database Quality Excellence prize, the 2008 Best E-book Prize, and the 2013 INNOBIZ designation as best company to work with. Actively involved with educating employees concerning copyright laws and the protection of academic works, in 2014 it was designated a "clean site" by the Copyright Protection Center.
