= The Plaza Seoul =

Hotel in Seoul, South Korea

THE PLAZA Seoul, Autograph Collection
- Front view of the hotel from Seoul Plaza
- Former names: Seoul Plaza Hotel
- Alternative names: Plaza Hotel
- Etymology: Seoul Plaza

General information
- Location: 119 Sogong-ro, Jung-gu, Seoul, South Korea, 04525
- Coordinates: 37°33′52″N 126°58′40″E
- Opening: 1976
- Owner: Hanhwa Hotels & Resorts

Height
- Height: 87 m (285 ft)

Technical details
- Floor count: 22

Design and construction
- Architects: Junglim Architecture; Taisei Construction Co.; Guido Ciompi (2010 renovation)

Other information
- Number of rooms: 319
- Number of restaurants: 4

Website
- Official website

THE PLAZA Seoul, Autograph Collection, formerly known as Seoul Plaza Hotel, is a hotel in Downtown Seoul. Name of the hotel comes from its location on southern side of Seoul Plaza.

== General Information ==
THE PLAZA Seoul, Autograph Collection (Korean: 더 플라자 호텔 서울, 오토그래프컬렉션) is a luxury boutique hotel chain owned and operated by a South Korean hospitality subsidiary Hanwha Hotel & Resort. It is located in So gong-ro 119, Jung-gu, Seoul, where the historical buildings such as the Deoksugung Palace and the Gyeongbokgung Palace are located. The hotel is within walking distance to major attractions such as Jungdong, Gwanghwamun, Seoul Station, Seoul Plaza, Myeongdong, and Insa-dong. It is also known as a business hotel in a location where domestic and foreign financial institutions and large corporations are concentrated. Since January 2018, it has been in a partnership with Marriott International's luxury lifestyle brand 'Autograph Collection' in South Korea.

== History ==
THE PLAZA Seoul was opened in October 1976 under the name "Seoul Plaza Hotel" and reopened in November 2010 as a luxury boutique hotel. The renovation of the Plaza was the first and largest full-scale business operation in South Korea's hotel industry, including front-facing, all rooms, food service, and lobby. The construction period took six months from May 2010, and the total construction cost was about 80 billion won. The Plaza Hotel features designs on all interior elements, as well as hotel exteriors, all rooms, and lobby exclusively by Italian designer Guido Ciompi.

== Facilities ==
The hotel has 319 rooms, four restaurants offering international cuisines, nine banquet halls that can serve as venues for diverse events, and other facilities including a fitness center and spa.

== In popular culture ==
The hotel appeared in 2024 South Korean film Exhuma as place of great location according to Pungsu.

== Awards ==
- In 2011, The Plaza was ranked No 1. from the Expedia Japan in Korea's Best Hotels after surveying facilities, location, breakfast, service and rate satisfaction.
- Selected as one of "The Best of Asia's Best Customer-Oriented, State-of-the-Art Hotel 10" by The Nation, a memorable weekly magazine.
- In 2011, CNNGo, the Asian Culture Travel Information website, selected The Plaza as one of the top hotels in the top 7 hotels in Asia
- Selected as "Traveler's Choice Top 25 Hotel" of Trip Advisor for the 4th consecutive year since 2012 as the world's largest hotel
- In 2013, 'Smart Travel Asia', the leading online travel magazine, selected The Plaza as 'Best Business Hotel in Asia 25'
- Annually selected as Top10 luxury hotel category hosted by Global Traveler since 2016
- In 2017, The Plaza was awarded as the “City Hotel” and the “Large Hotel (over 400 rooms)” at the International Hotel Awards, for the first Korean hotel

== Gallery ==
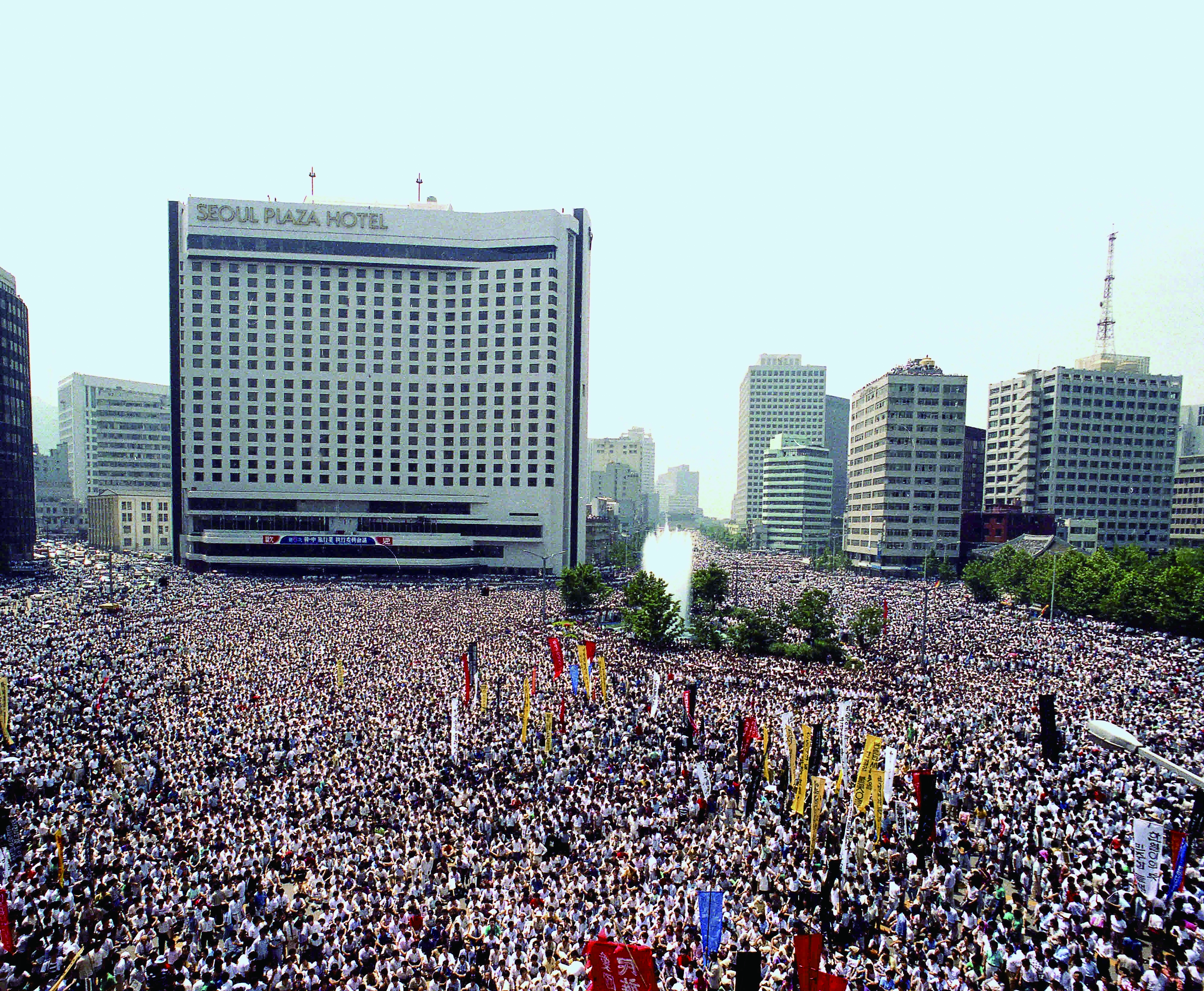
The hotel in 1987, with large protest nearby for the June Democratic Movement

Front view (2018)

== See also ==
- Seoul Plaza
- Tourism in Seoul
- Downtown Seoul
