= Tourism in Seoul =

Seoul is ranked 14th most visited city in the world in 2023. Of the 11,031,665 foreign tourists visiting South Korea in 2023, 80.3% visited Seoul.

== Tourist destinations ==
=== Gyeongbokgung ===
Gyeongbokgung Palace is the main palace of the Joseon Dynasty, located on Jongno District, with an area of 343,888 m^{2}. It was founded in 1395 (the 4th year of King Taejo's reign).

The main gates of Gyeongbokgung
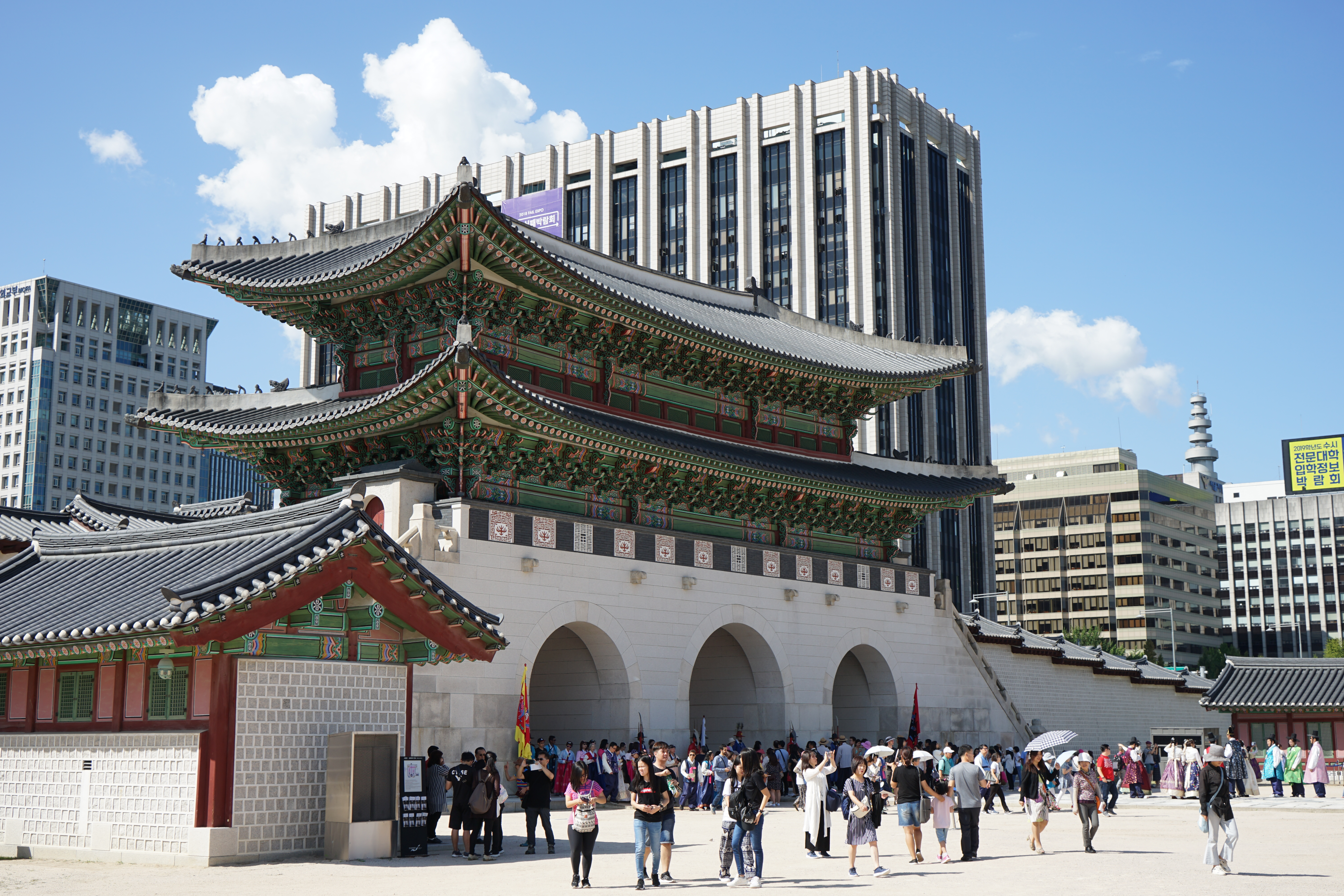
Gwanghwamun

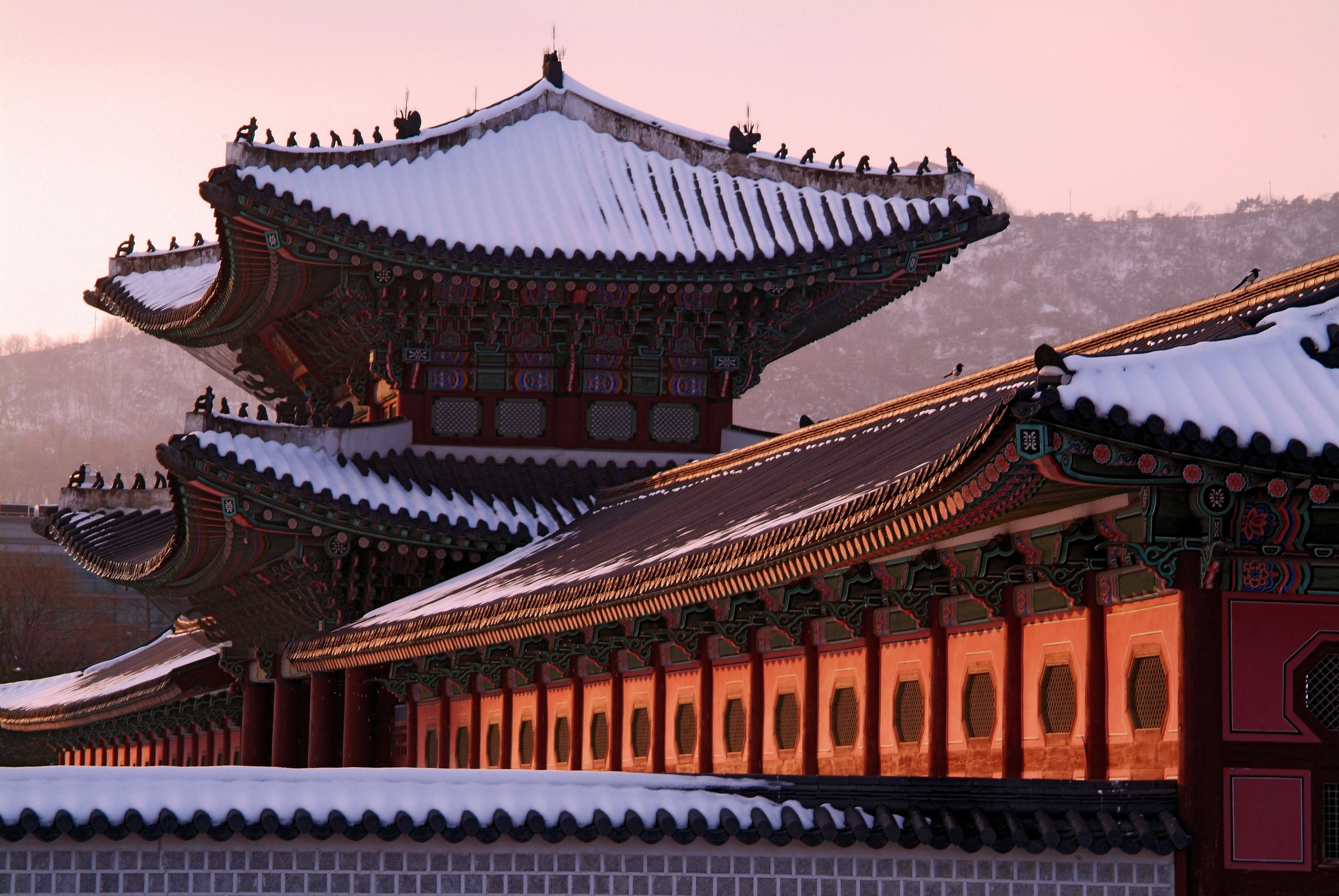
Heungnyemun

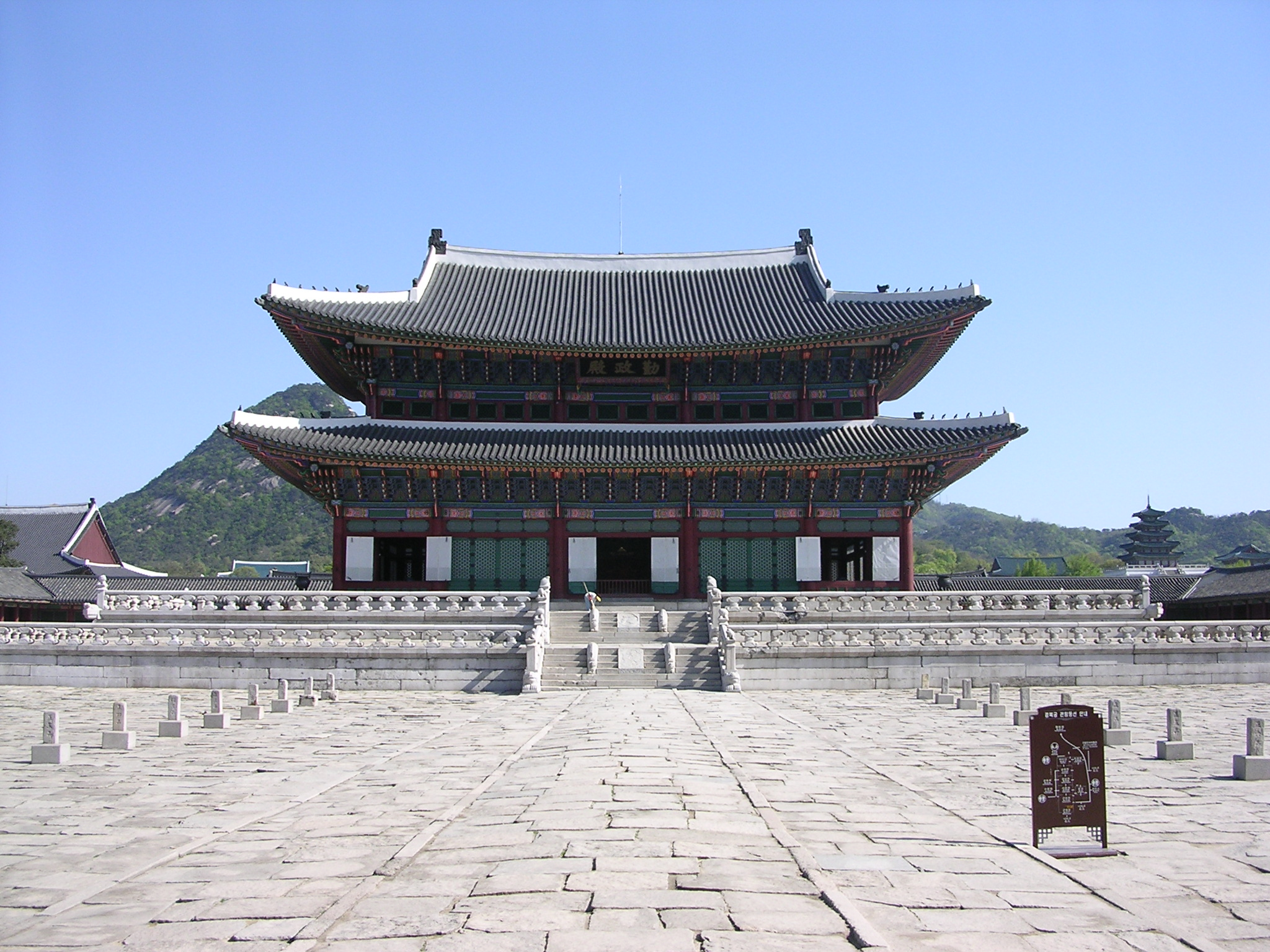
Geunjeongmun

=== N Seoul Tower ===
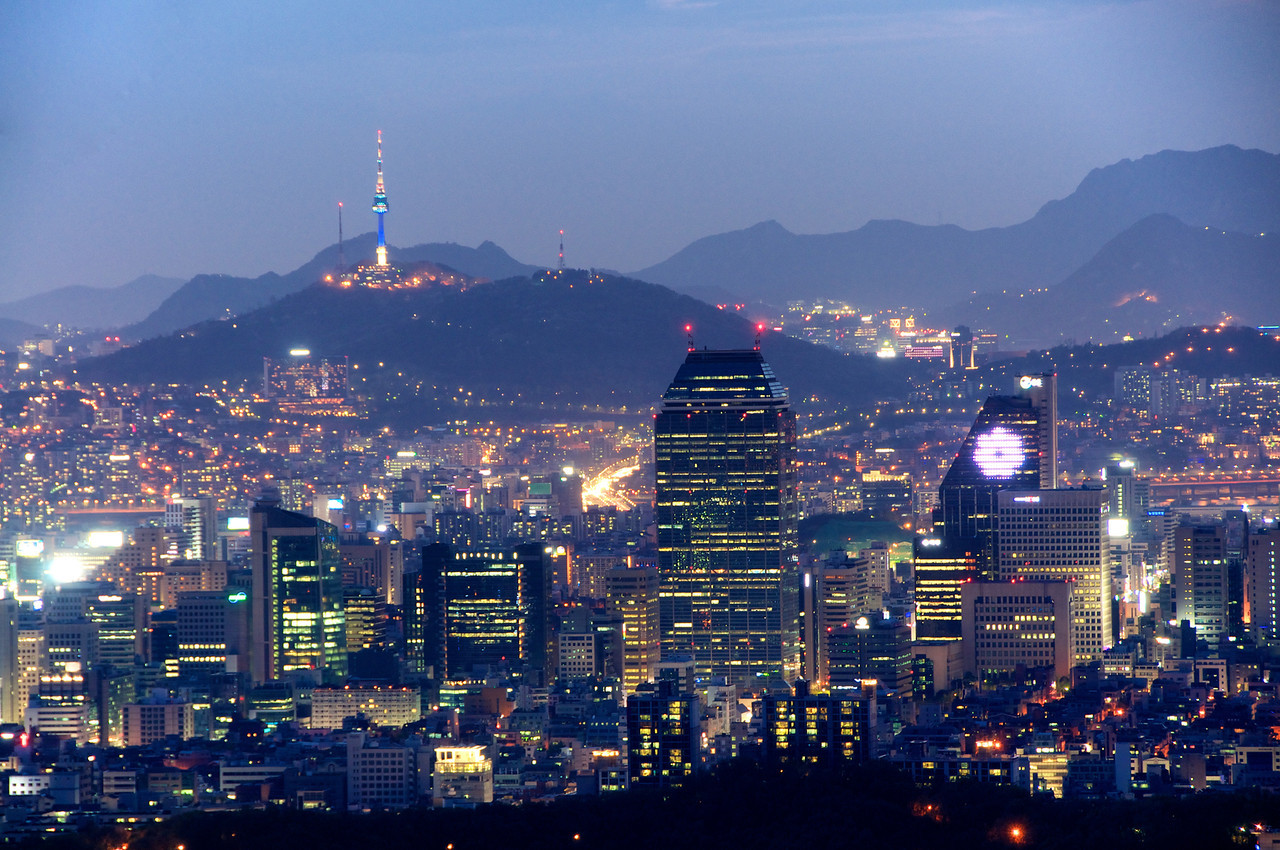
N Seoul Tower at night

N Seoul Tower or Namsan Tower is a radio transmission tower located near the top of Namsan Park in Yongsan District. Construction began in 1969 and the observation deck was completed in 1975. It is 236.7 meters high and 479.7 meters above sea level. In 2000, It was acquired by YTN, a news television station.

A list of the popular places for the visitors is as follows:

- Seoul Olympic Stadium
- Cheonggyecheon – a river belonging to the Han River system and a tributary of Jungnangcheon.
- Changdeokgung Palace
- Deoksugung Palace
- Gwanghwamun Plaza
- 63 Building
- Bukchon Hanok Village
- National Museum of Korea
- Fortress Wall of Seoul

== See also ==
- List of museums in Seoul
- Sports in Seoul
- Tourism in South Korea
