= Jaseondang =

Hall in Gyeongbokgung, Seoul, South Korea

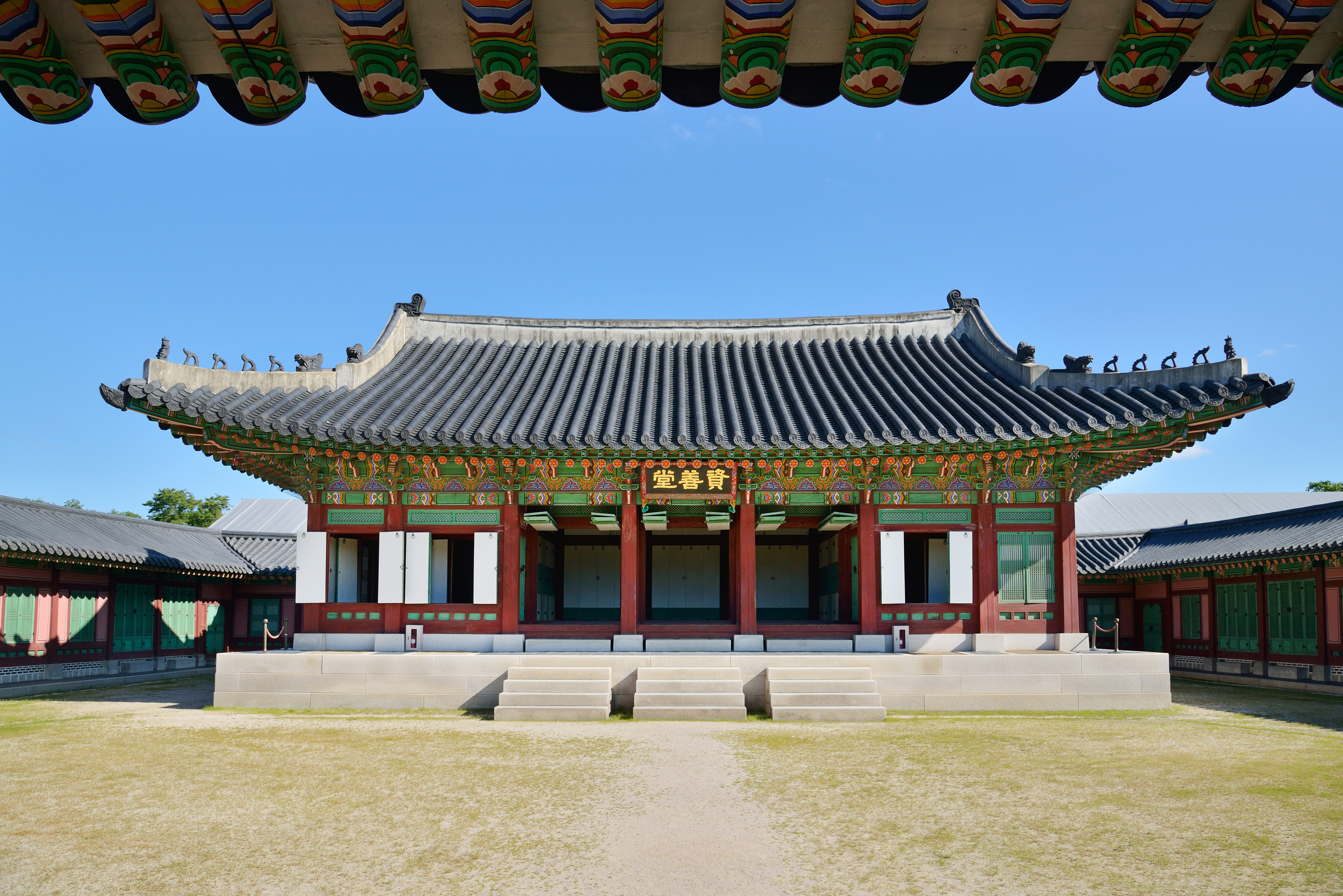
- The building
- Interactive map of the Jaseondang area

General information
- Location: Gyeongbokgung, Seoul, South Korea
- Coordinates: 37°34′44″N 126°58′41″E

Korean name
- Hangul: 자선당
- Hanja: 資善堂
- RR: Jaseondang
- MR: Chasŏndang

Jaseondang (Korean: 자선당; Hanja: 資善堂) is a hall in the East Palace (동궁; 東宮; Donggung; Tonggung) of Gyeongbokgung in Seoul, South Korea. It was one of the main buildings used for the education of the crown prince.

== History ==
Jaseondang was first built in 1427 and was used for the king's state affairs. Queen Hyeondeok died here in 1441. The building began to be used by crown princes in 1450. After the death of King Munjong (r. 1450–1452), the building was used for other purposes. It again began to be used by crown princes during the reign of King Jungjong (r. 1506–1544). King Injong was born here in 1515. It was destroyed in a 1543 fire and rebuilt in 1554.

In 1865, the buildings Eojodang and Yungbokjeon of the palace Gyeonghuigung were demolished and recycled to build Jaseondang. Jaseondang was again destroyed in the 1867 fire, and was rebuilt by 1888. In July 1914, the building was sold and later reassembled in the private home of Japanese businessman Ōkura Kihachirō in Tokyo. The building was renamed Chōsenkan (朝鮮館; 조선관; Chosŏn'gwan). Its conversion into a museum was completed in September 1916. It was destroyed in the 1923 Great Kantō earthquake. Afterwards, a hotel was built on its former site. Some of the building's remains were used as flower pots.

Its remains were only returned to Korea in either December 1995 or January 1996. The remains were so damaged that they were not able to be used in reconstructing Jaseondang, so they are now on display near Geoncheonggung. In 2001, Jaseondang was rebuilt on its original spot.
