= Hyangwonjeong =

Pavilion in Gyeongbokgung, Seoul, South Korea

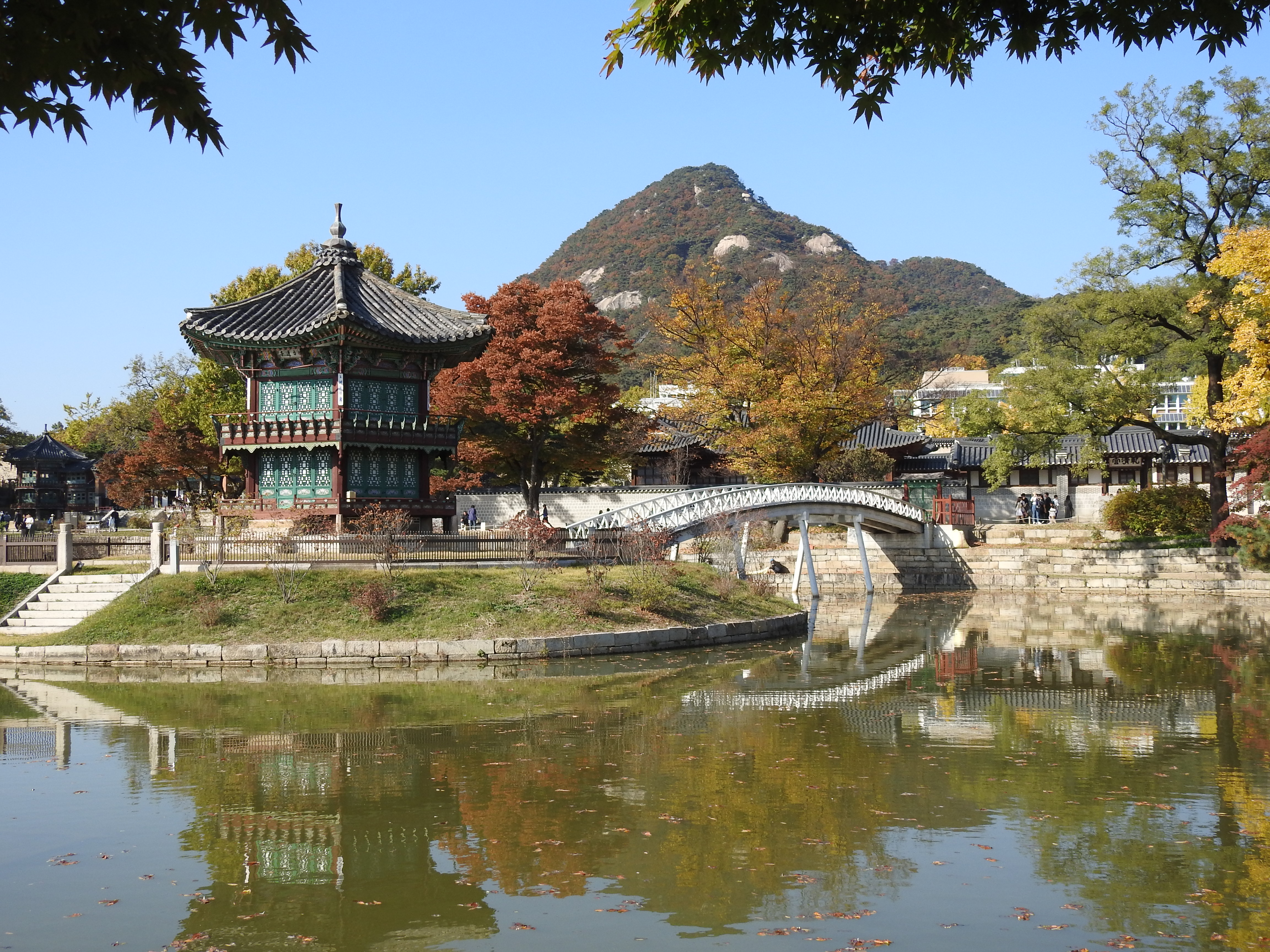
- The building in the summer (2024)
- Interactive map of the Hyangwonjeong area

General information
- Location: Gyeongbokgung, Seoul, South Korea
- Coordinates: 37°34′56″N 126°58′37″E

Design and construction
- Designations

Treasures of South Korea
- Official name: Hyangwonjeong Pavilion of Gyeongbokgung Palace
- Designated: 2012-03-02

Korean name
- Hangul: 향원정
- Hanja: 香遠亭
- RR: Hyangwonjeong
- MR: Hyangwŏnjŏng

Hyangwonjeong (Korean: 향원정; Hanja: 香遠亭; lit. 'Far-spreading Fragrance Pavilion') is a pavilion in the palace Gyeongbokgung in Seoul, South Korea.

The building is a two-story hexagonal pavilion on an island in the pond Hyangwonji (향원지; 香遠池) that was used for leisure. It was built some time between 1867 and 1873. The building is named for a phrase in the Chinese text Ailianshuo. In 1894, Western missionaries demonstrated figure skating to the royal family on the frozen pond. Various temporary buildings were constructed around the pond for the 1929 Chōsen Exhibition. The bridge to the pavilion, Chwihyanggyo (취향교; 醉香橋; Ch'wihyanggyo; 'Intoxicated by Fragrance Bridge'), was completed in 1873. It was the longest wooden bridge built over a pond during the Joseon period. The bridge was initially located to the north of the pavilion, but after it was destroyed by a bombing during the 1950–1953 Korean War, it was rebuilt to the south side in 1953. In 2021, the 1953 bridge was demolished, rebuilt as a wooden bridge, and was restored to its original location.

== Gallery ==
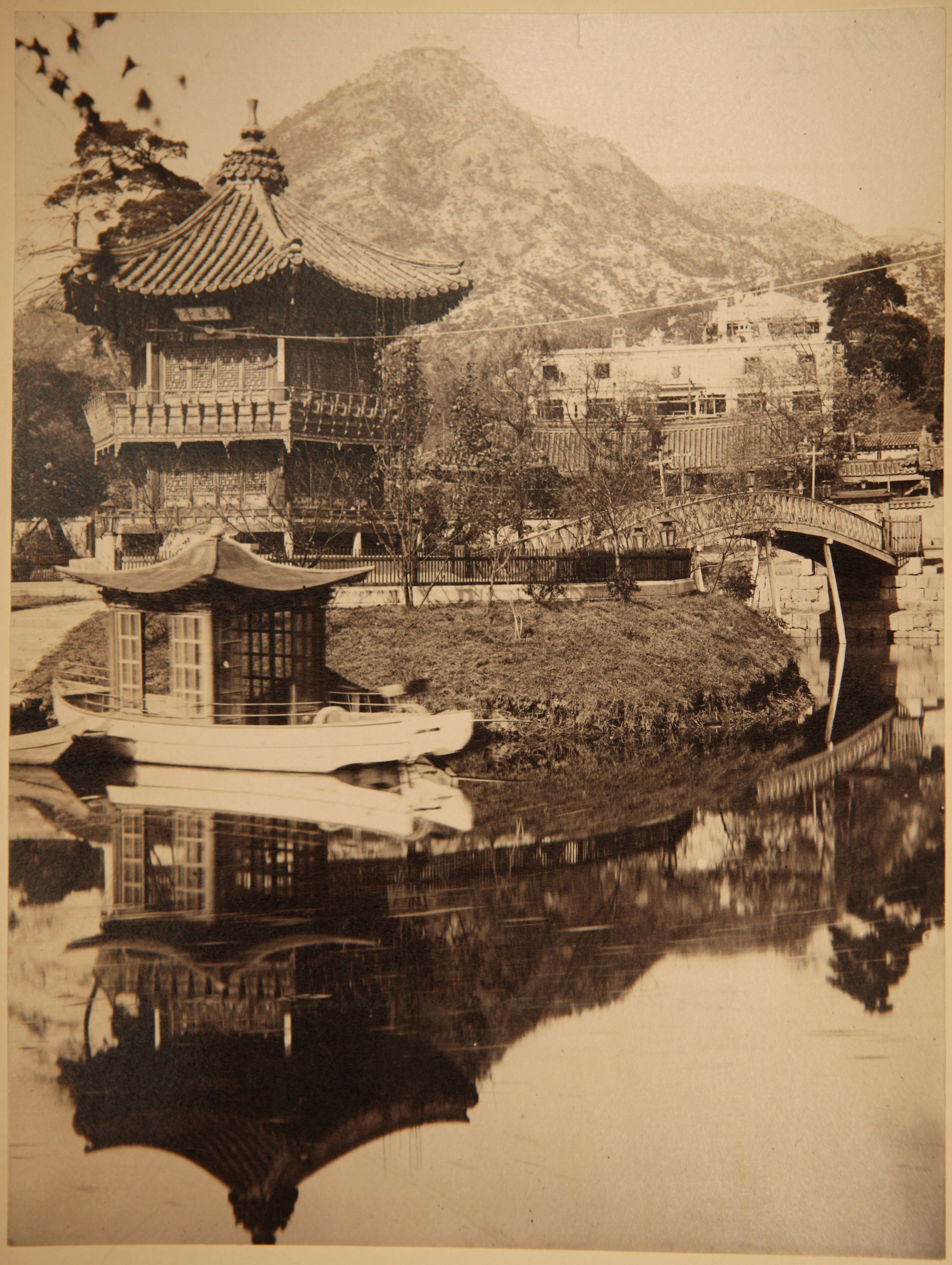
1900

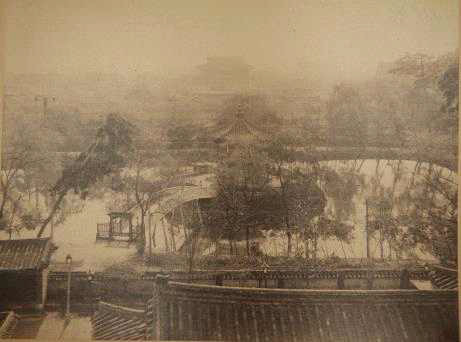
1900

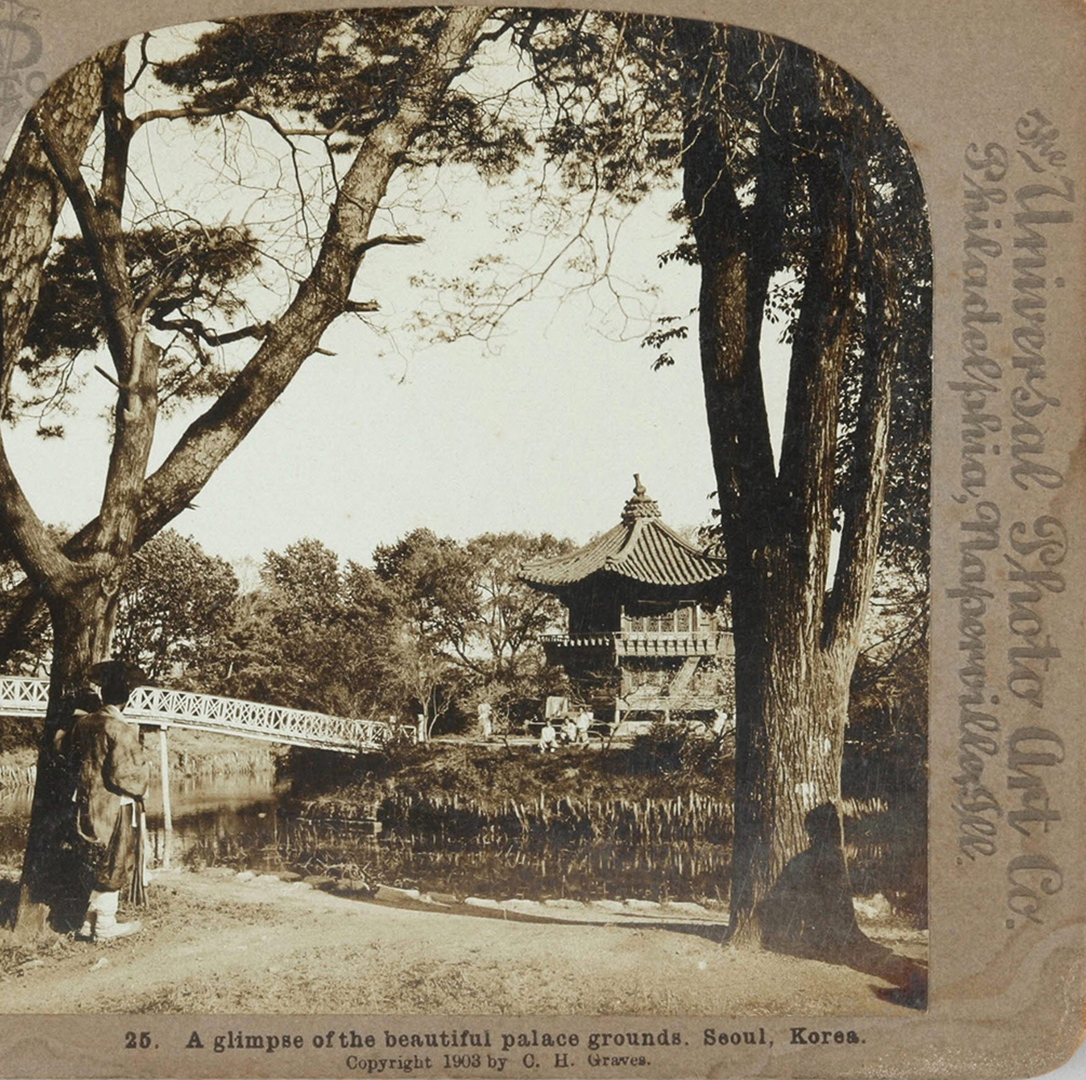
1903

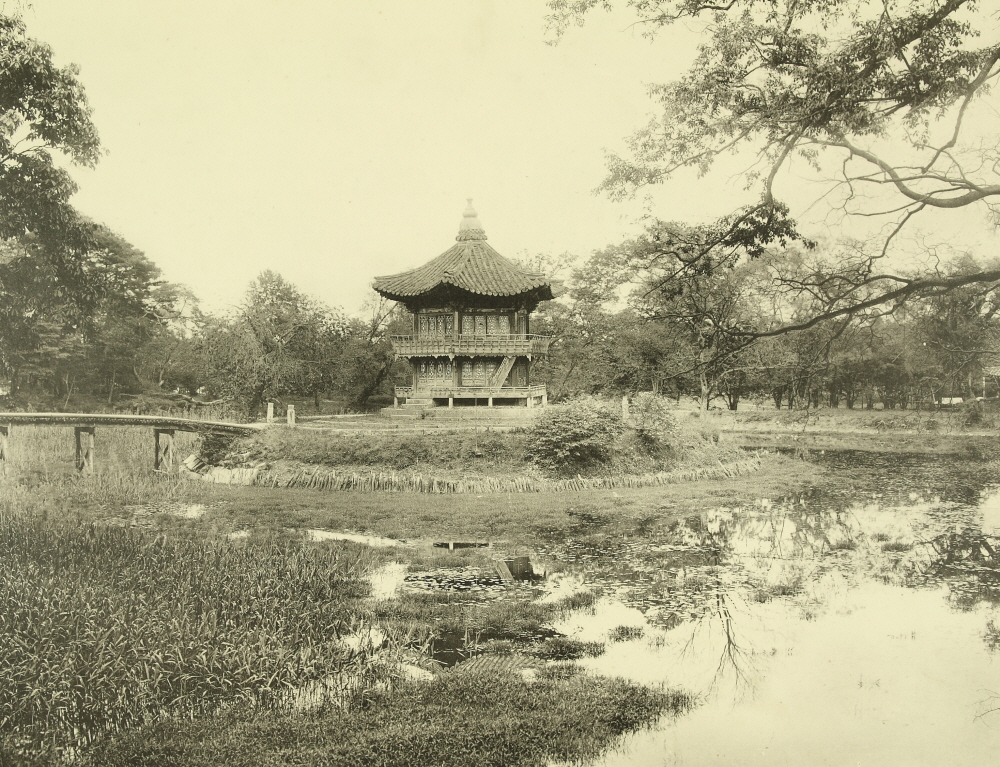
1930

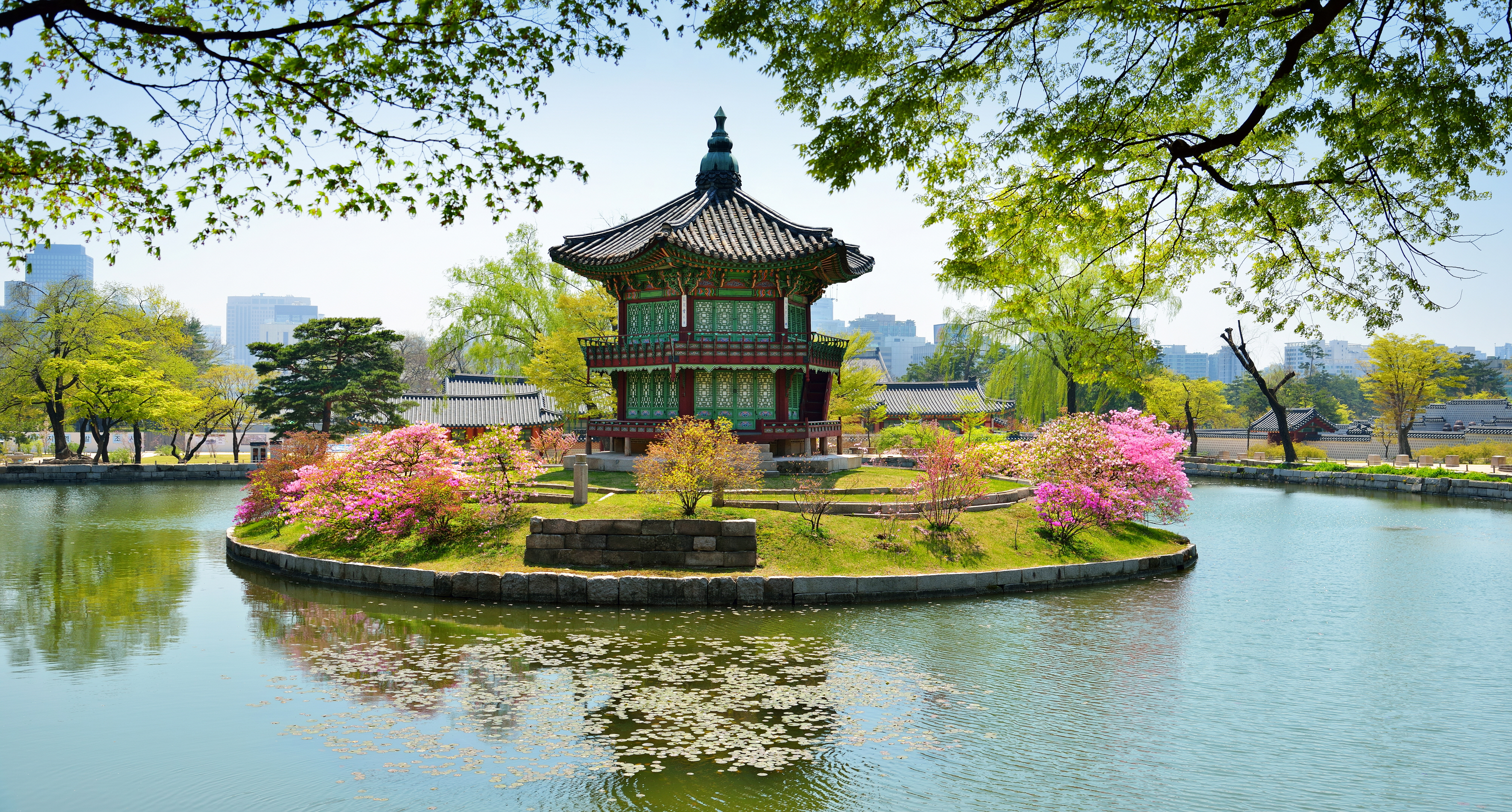
2013 spring

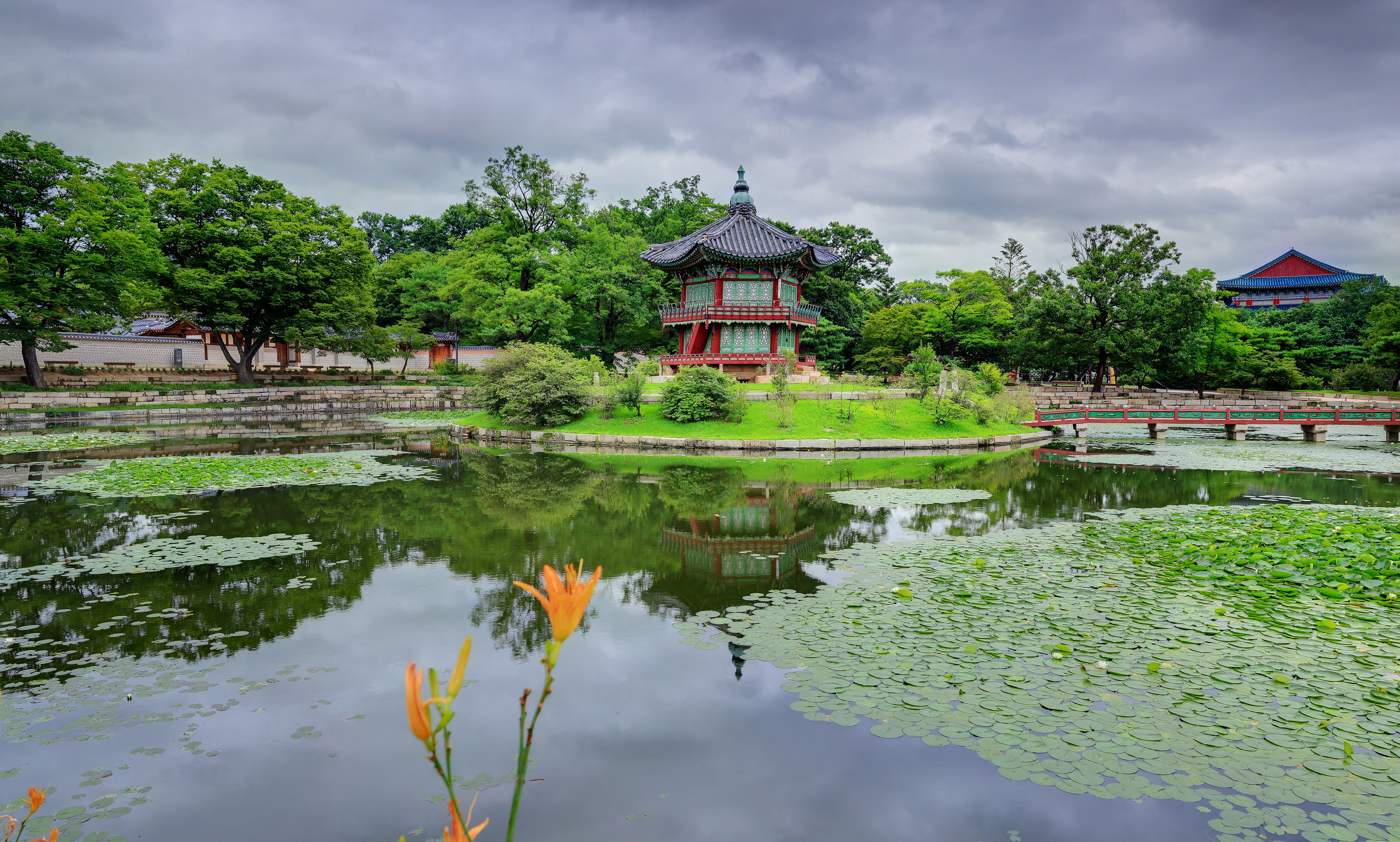
2013 summer

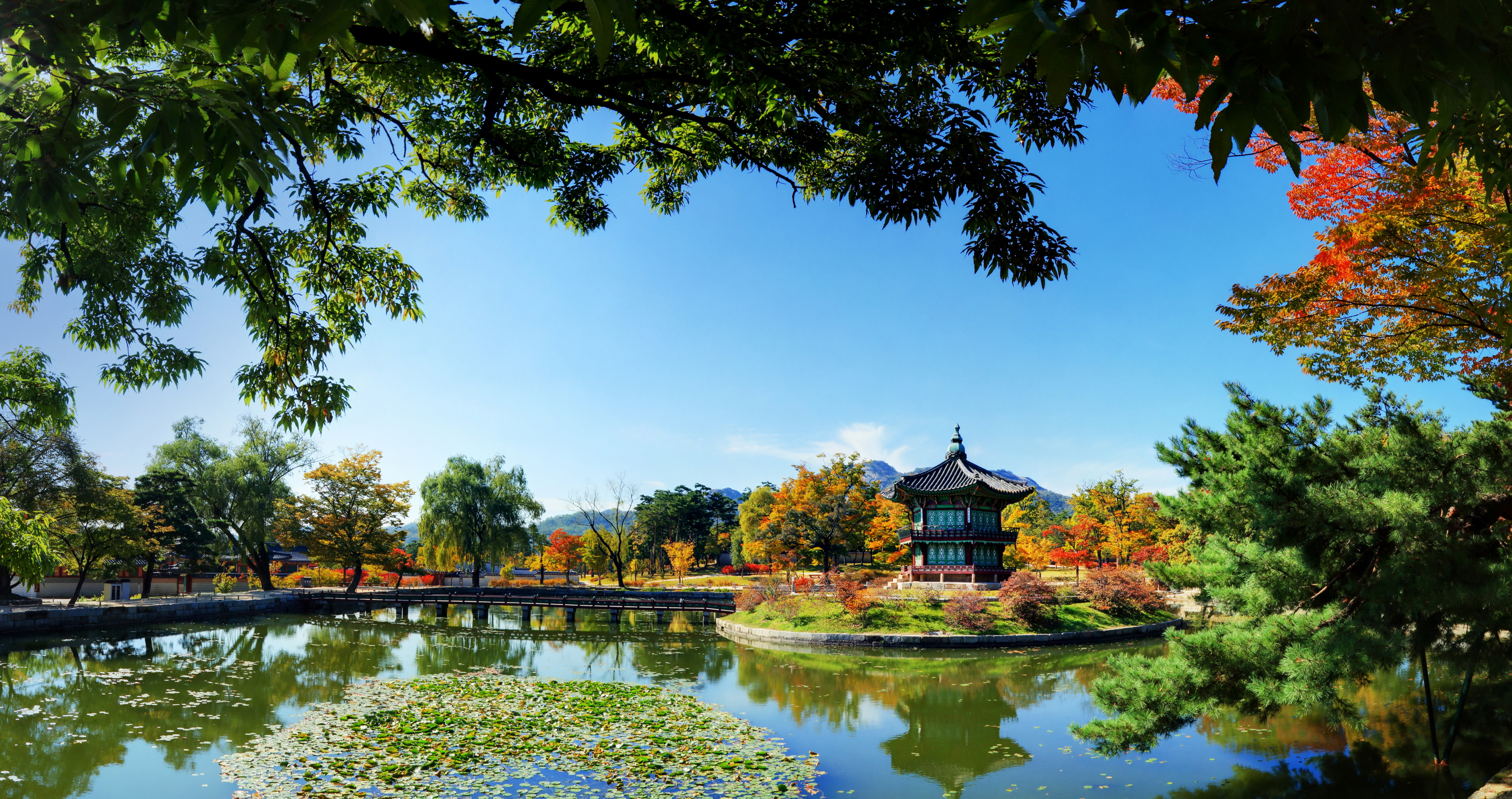
2013 fall

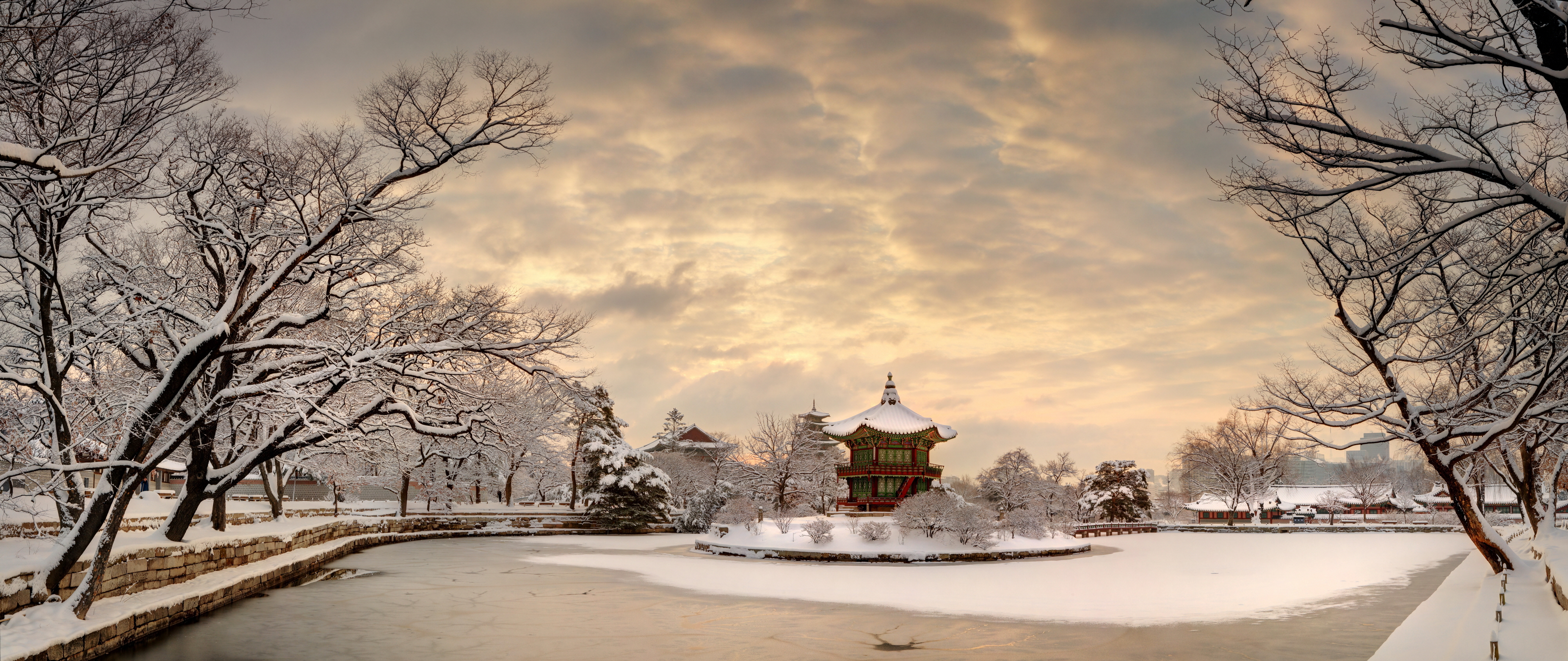
2013 winter
