= Gyeongbokgung =

Palace in Seoul, South Korea

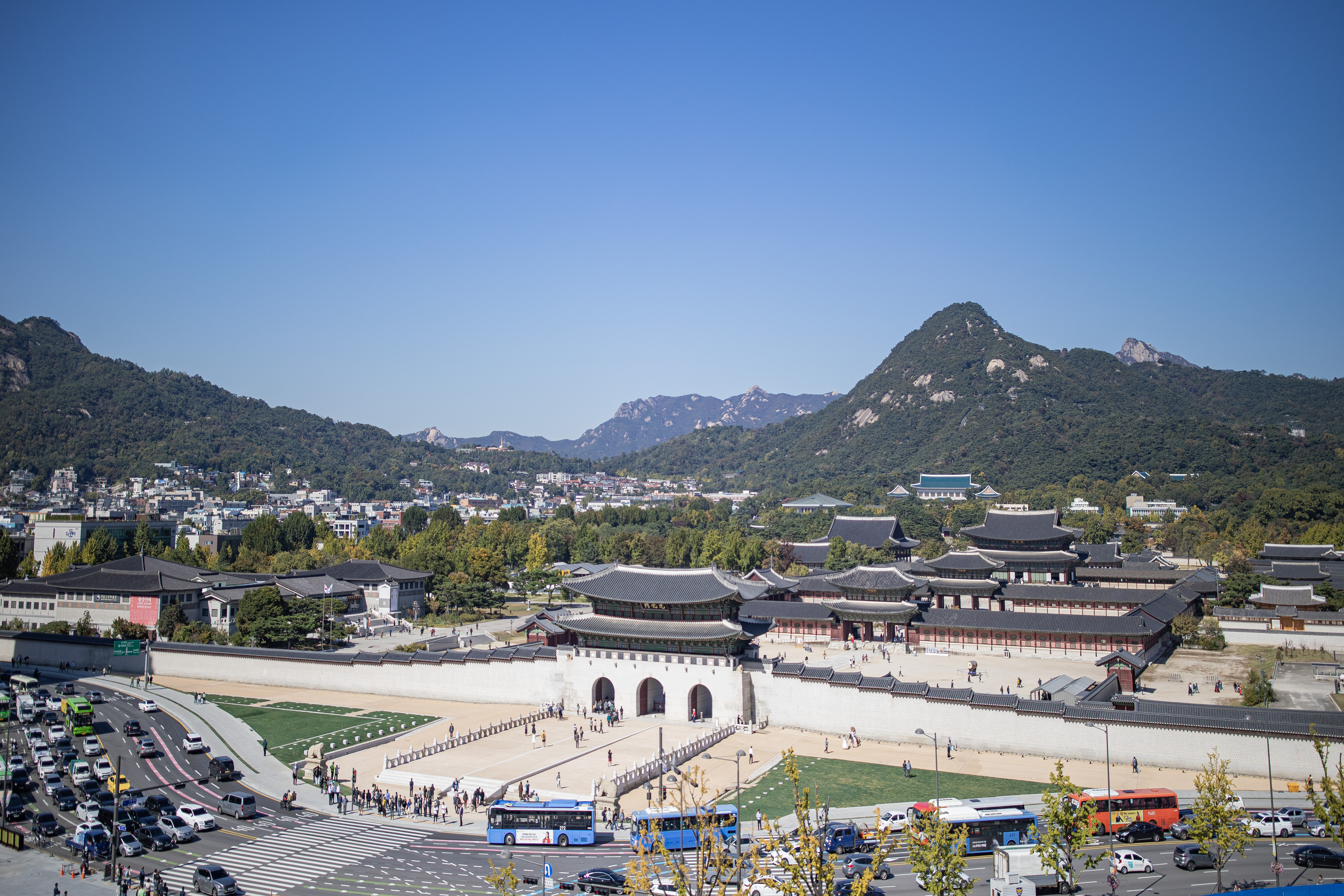
- Gyeongbokgung in 2023
- Interactive map of the Gyeongbokgung area

General information
- Location: Jongno District, Seoul, South Korea
- Coordinates: 37.579884°N 126.9768°E
- Inaugurated: 1395; 631 years ago

Design and construction
- Designations

Historic Sites of South Korea
- Designated: January 21, 1963

Website
- royal.cha.go.kr/ENG/main/index.do

Korean name
- Hangul: 경복궁
- Hanja: 景福宮
- RR: Gyeongbokgung
- MR: Kyŏngbokkung
- IPA: [kjʌŋbok̚k͈uŋ]

Gyeongbokgung (Korean: 경복궁; Hanja: 景福宮; pronounced [kjʌŋbok̚k͈uŋ]) is a former royal palace in Seoul, South Korea. Established in 1395, it was the first royal palace of the Joseon dynasty, and is now one of the most significant tourist attractions in the country.

The palace was among the first landmarks to be established in Seoul. It flourished under the 1418–1450 reign of Sejong the Great; Sejong led the creation of the native Korean script Hangul at the palace. In 1592, amidst the Imjin War, the palace was completely burned down. Plans to repair the palace fell through amidst funding shortages after the war. It would not be restored until the late 19th century, during the reign of the penultimate monarch Gojong.

In 1910, Japan colonized Korea. As the palace was a symbol of the Korean monarchy's authority, Japan systematically demolished and altered it. Almost all of its around 500 structures were sold off and shipped elsewhere; by the 1945 liberation of Korea, only 40 pre-colonial buildings remained. In their place, modern-style colonial buildings like the Government-General of Chōsen Building were established.

After decades of political turmoil and poor economic conditions, significant efforts to restore the palace to its pre-colonial state began in the 1980s. Since then, the 1990–2010 First Gyeongbokgung Restoration Plan and 2008–2045 Second Gyeongbokgung Restoration Plan have resulted in the recreations of dozens of buildings in the palace, with dozens more scheduled for the future.

The palace hosts a changing of the guard ceremony twice per day. It contains the National Folk Museum of Korea and the National Palace Museum of Korea. Gyeongbokgung is accessible by the subway station Gyeongbokgung Station. For part of the year, it is open at night. Entrance is free for visitors wearing hanbok (traditional Korean clothing).

== Name ==
Gyeongbokgung means 'great blessings palace'. The palace and many of its main structures were named by the Korean official Chŏng Tojŏn around the time of the palace's establishment. Chŏng named the palace in the 10th month of 1395 after the final two characters of a poem from the Classic of Poetry: "already drunk on alcohol, already full of virtue, gentlemen will long enjoy your great blessings" (旣醉以酒 旣飽以德 君子萬年 介爾景福).

The palace has also been called Bukgwol (북궐; 北闕; Pukkwŏl; 'north palace'); this term was used in relation to the other palaces in the city.

== History ==
=== Establishment ===
After establishing Joseon in 1392 (Korean calendar), the founding king Taejo (r. 1392–1398) began work in establishing a new capital for his state. In the 8th month of 1394, it was decided that Hanyang (now "Seoul") would be the capital.

The location of the palace was finalized by the 1st day, 9th month of 1394. Construction began on it in the 12th month. The first phase of the palace's construction was completed on the 25th day, 9th month of 1395. The palace's original scale, while smaller and less developed than its later form, is difficult to precisely determine; varying estimates have been provided, such as it had 390 rooms (칸; k'an) or 755 rooms. On the 28th day, 12th month, Taejo moved into the palace. In 1398, amidst political turmoil, Joseon's capital was changed to Kaegyŏng (now Kaesong), then back to Hanyang in 1405. The palace was abandoned for about ten years.

In 1404, King Taejong (r. 1400–1418) ordered that the palace Changdeokgung be established in Hanyang. Upon his return to the city in 1405, he began to reside in that palace. In 1406, he began efforts to repair Gyeongbokgung. Although he repaired and expanded Gyeongbokgung, Taejong functionally avoided it, possibly because he associated it with unpleasant memories of political turmoil. He primarily resided in Changdeokgung instead. Until the Imjin War, Taejong and his successors had Gyeongbokgung as their official palace (법궁; 法宮; pŏpkung), but had secondary palaces (이궁; 離宮; igung) that they often resided in more or moved between.

=== Before the Imjin War ===
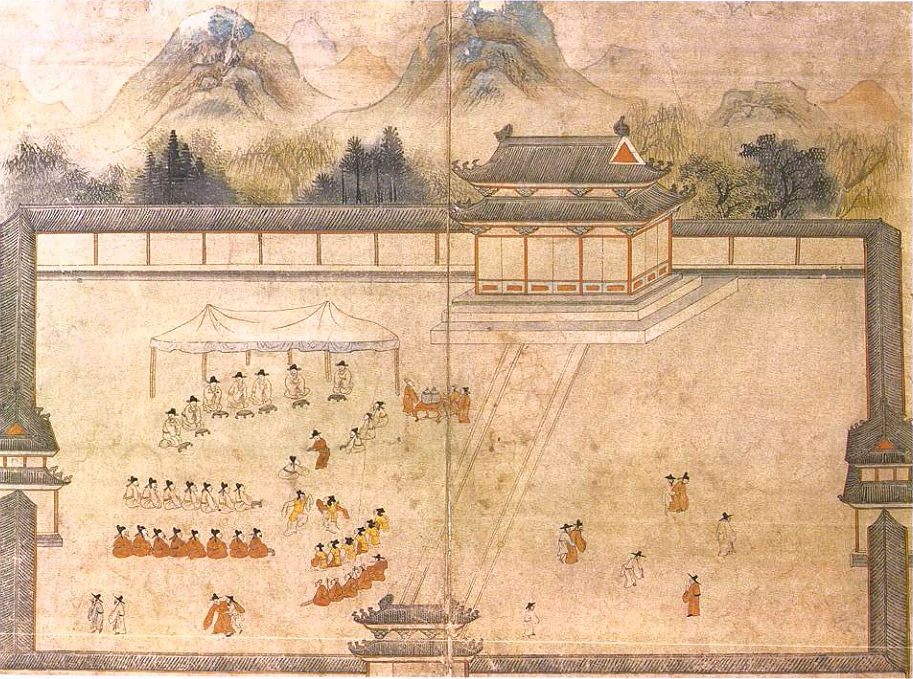
A reproduction of a painting (Note: Entitled Chungmyojosŏyŏgwansayŏndo (중묘조서여관사연도; 中廟朝書筵官賜宴圖), from the collection Ŭiryŏng namssiga chŏnhwach'ŏp.) of a 1535 banquet in the palace

In 1421, Sejong the Great (r. 1418–1450) made Gyeongbokgung his primary palace. By 1427, he officially moved out of Changdeokgung and into Gyeongbokgung. Sejong greatly renovated and expanded the palace. It was during Sejong's reign that Gyeongbokgung became fully-fledged and functional. Under Sejong, the palace hosted a number of scientific devices, including the water clock Borugak Jagyeongnu, a facility for producing movable type, and the astronomical observatory Ganuidae. The palace was then host to the Hall of Worthies and Ŏnmunch'ŏng, which assisted Sejong in developing Hangul. The palace remained in much the same form from Sejong's reign for around a hundred years.

=== Destruction and disuse ===
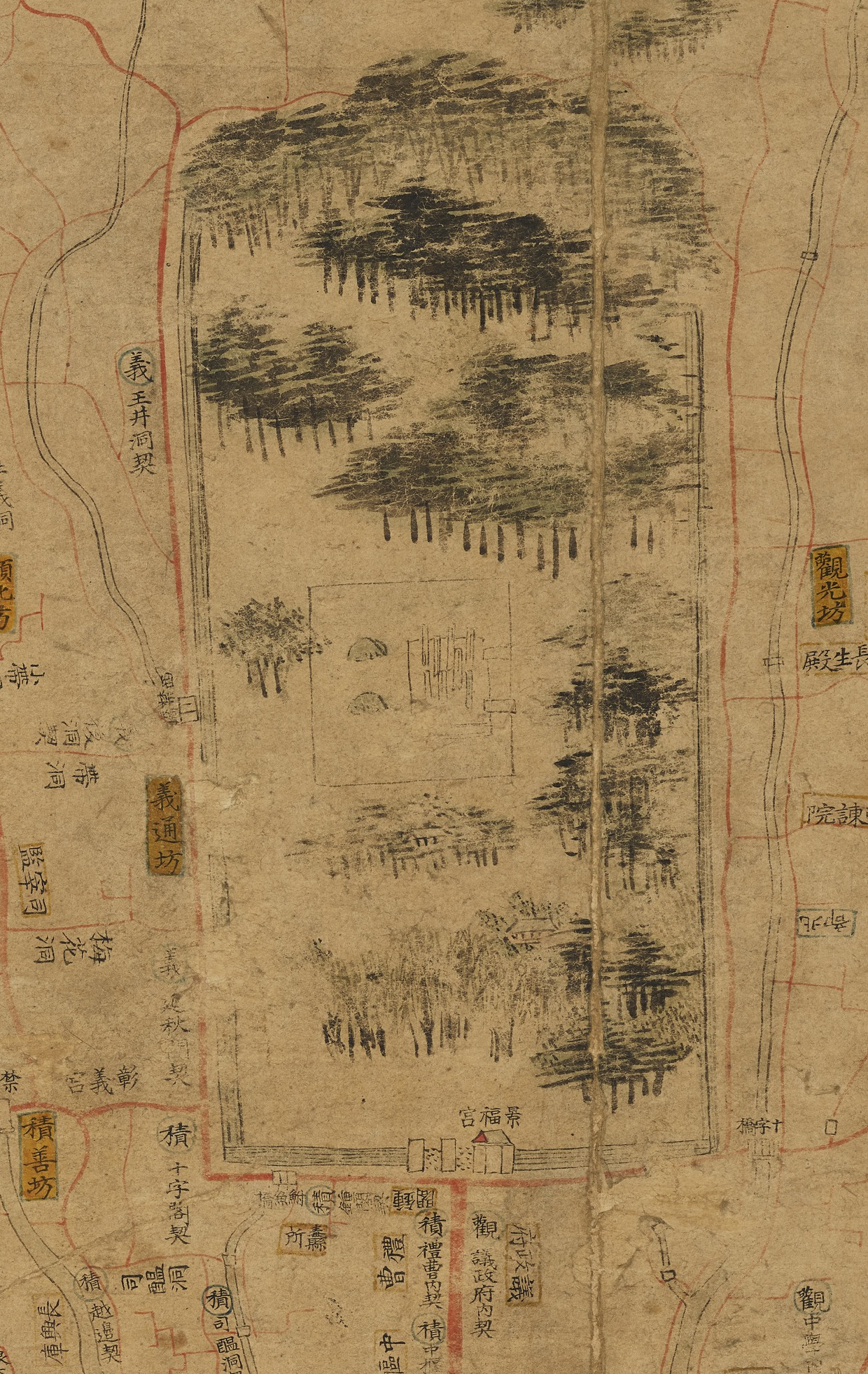
Gyeongbokgung in the 18th-century map Tosŏngdaejido.

In 1592, during the 1592–1598 Imjin War, Gyeongbokgung and the other two palaces in the city were completely burned down. It is debated who burned down the palaces. Various contemporary Korean texts, including the Veritable Records of Seonjo, report hearsay that it was Korean commoners who burned down the palace to destroy palace records. However, the palace was still intact when the Japanese invaders entered the city on the 2nd day, 5th month of that year. Japanese discipline in the city was reportedly initially high, but when they began suffering defeats, they took their frustrations out on the city and locals, burning buildings.

King Seonjo (r. 1567–1608) had fled the city before the Japanese had entered it. After he returned to Hanyang, he ordered that plans for the Gyeongbokgung's reconstruction be drawn up. However, Joseon's economy was still recovering from the devastating war and finances were tight; Gyeongbokgung's reconstruction was indefinitely postponed and the state's resources were mostly focused on rebuilding Changdeokgung.

For around 270 years afterwards, Gyeongbokgung went mostly unused and undeveloped. Over time, various kings expressed interest in rebuilding the palace, but did not act on this, due to financial constraints and the other palaces in the city being sufficient.

=== Reconstruction ===
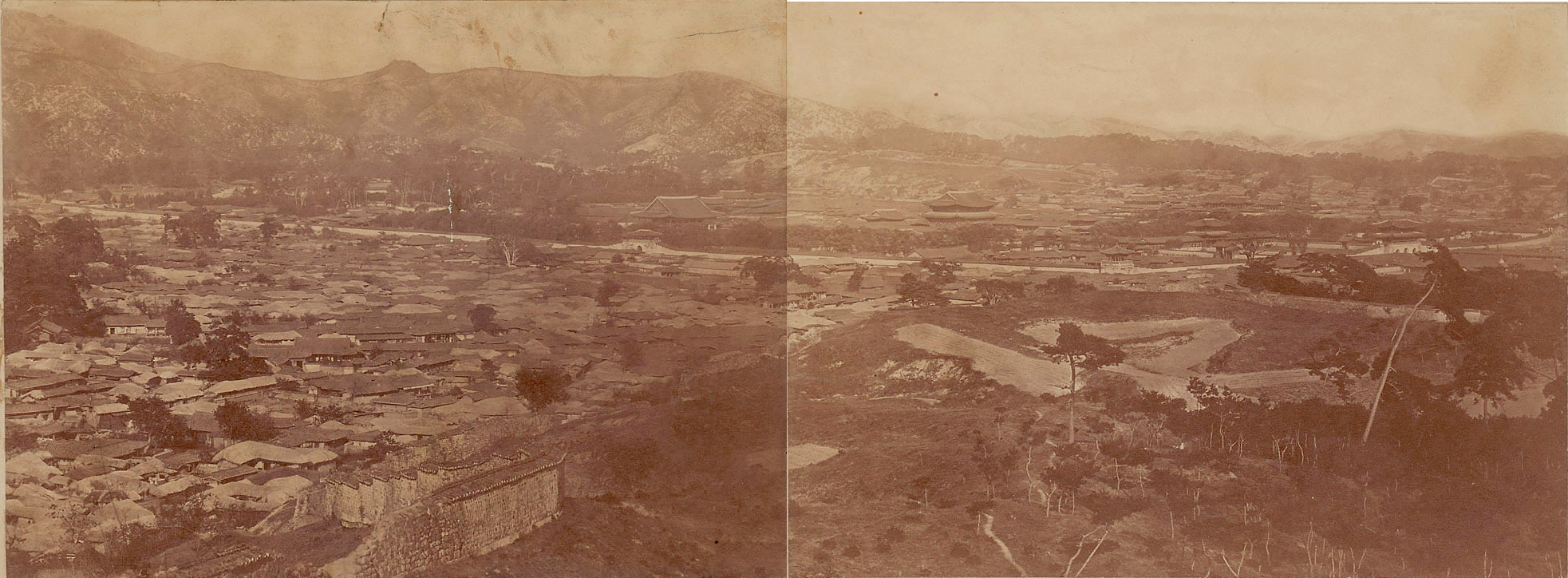
View of Gyeongbokgung (1886)

On the 2nd day, 4th month of 1865, Queen Sinjeong, regent of the penultimate Korean monarch King Gojong (r. 1864–1907), ordered that the palace be reconstructed. Construction began on the 13th day of that month. Gojong and the royal family moved into the palace on the 2nd day, 7th month of 1868. Construction continued until 1873.

The palace experienced a major fire on the 10th day, 12th month of 1873. After delays due to financial restraints, reconstruction began on the 27th day, 3rd month of 1875. Gojong returned to Gyeongbokgung on the 27th day, 5th month of that year, and repairs concluded on the 3rd day, 6th month. However, on the 4th day, 11th month of 1876, another major fire broke out. It caused more than twice as much damage as its predecessor. Gojong was exasperated by the fires, and relocated to Changdeokgung. Reconstruction on Gyeongbokgung began in 1881. Gojong did not return to Gyeongbokgung until 1884, after the Kapsin Coup. In 1887, the first electric light in Korea was turned on in Gyeongbokgung. Reconstruction was finally completed in 1888.

Meanwhile, the palace and Korea experienced significant political turmoil. In 1895, the Korean Queen Min was assassinated by Japanese agents at Geoncheonggung in the palace. Afterwards, Gojong fled to the Russian legation for protection in 1896.

=== Korean Empire period ===
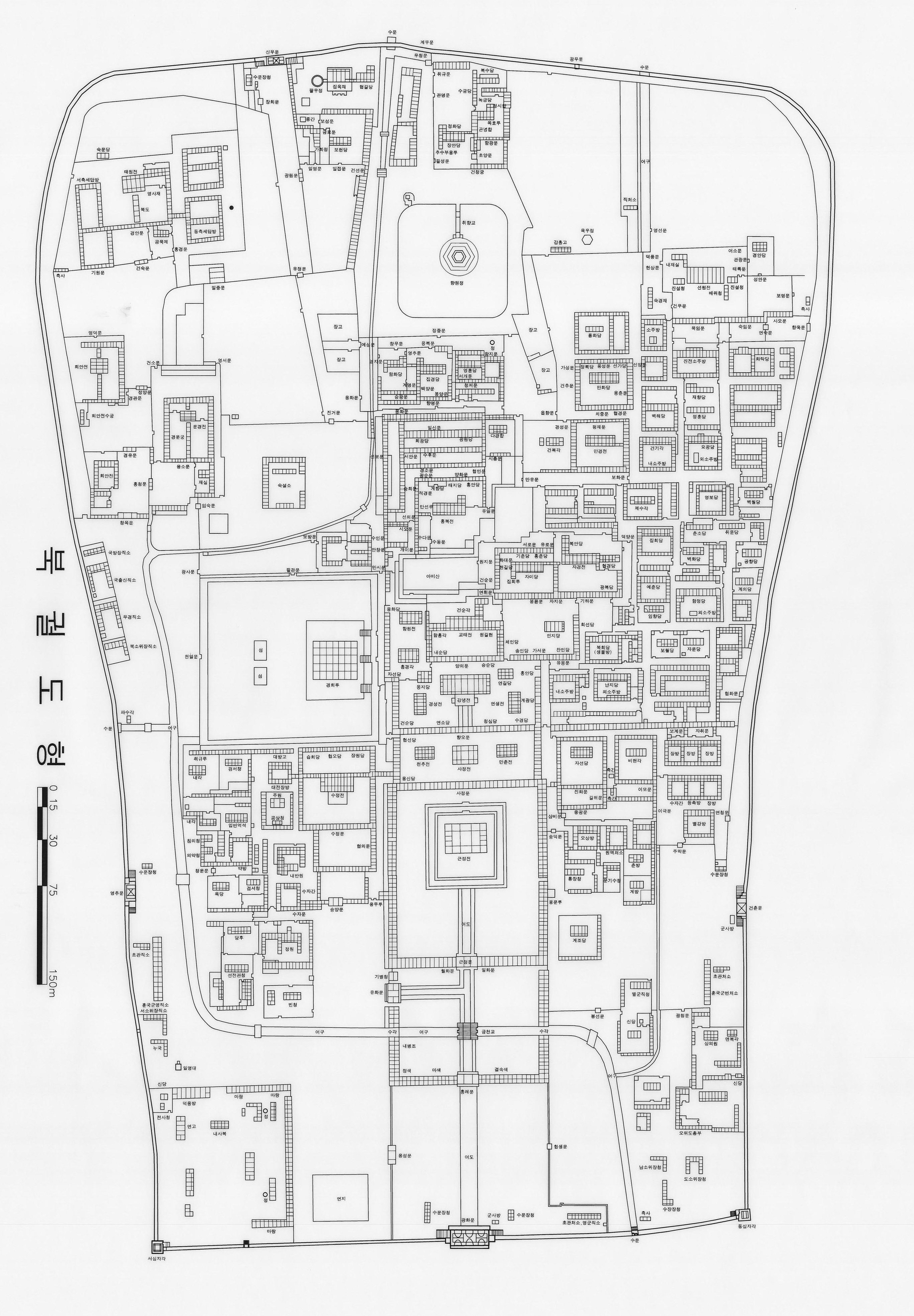
Diagram of the palace in 1907

Rather than return to Gyeongbokgung, where Min had been assassinated, Gojong chose to make Gyeongungung (later called "Deoksugung") his primary residence for its proximity to various foreign legations, which he believed could help protect him from Japan. He then declared the establishment of the Korean Empire. Thereafter, Gyeongbokgung was not significantly used by Gojong. In 1905, Japan began indirectly ruling Korea, and in 1907, Gojong was forced to abdicate in lieu of his son, Sunjong. Sunjong began to use Changdeokgung as his main palace.

In 1907, even before annexing Korea, Japan made Gyeongbokgung into a public park. Under pressure from Japan, the government began auctioning off the palace's property to the public in 1910, just before Korea was annexed. Mostly Japanese people bought the buildings and had them sent elsewhere.

=== Colonial period ===
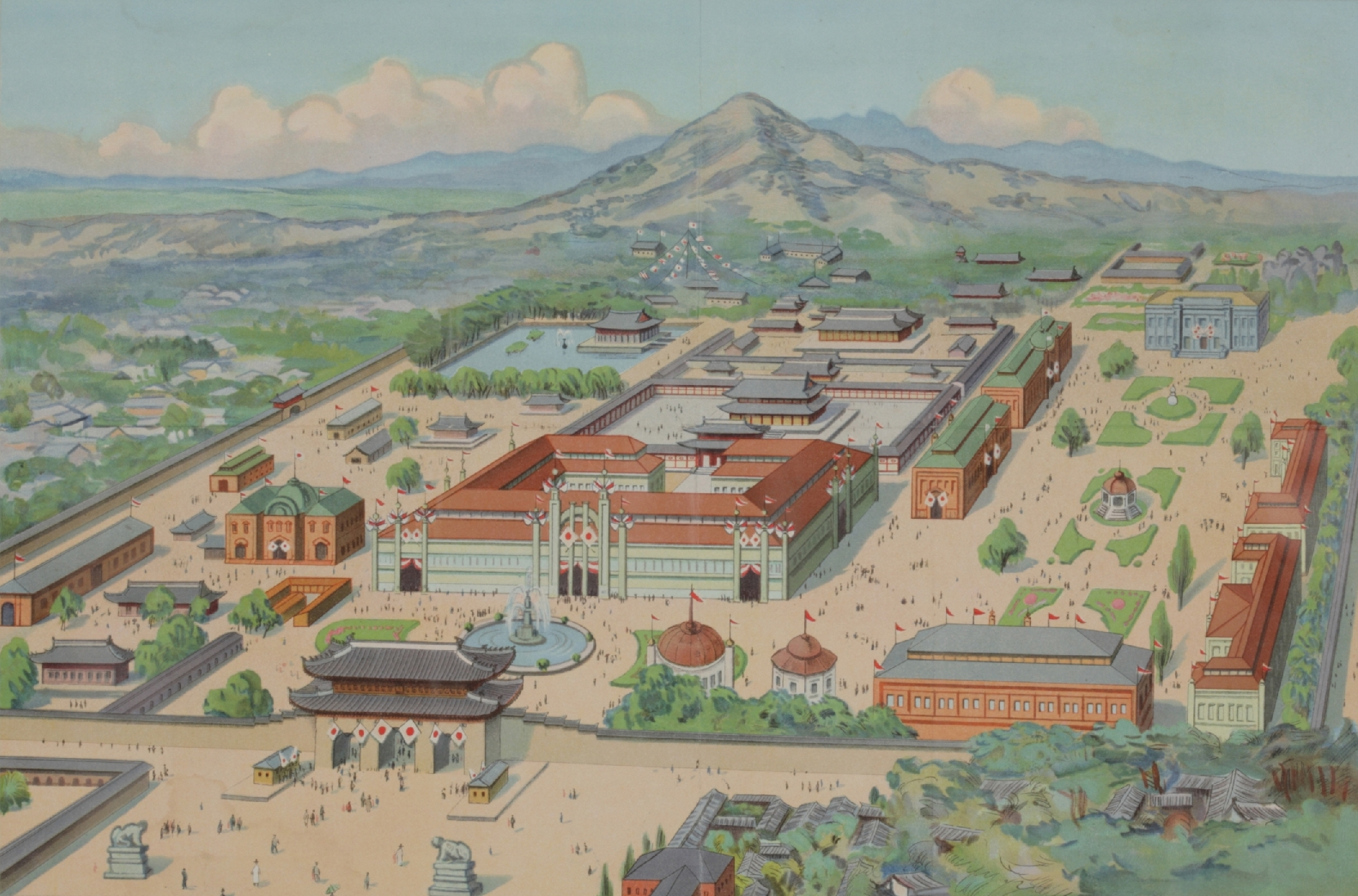
Drawing of the palace during the 1915 Chōsen Industrial Exhibition

Gyeongbokgung, as a symbol of the Korean monarchy's authority, was systematically dismantled by the Japanese colonial government. It is estimated that the palace had around 500 buildings in 1888; by the end of the colonial period, only 40 of those buildings remained. The palace was rapidly modified in anticipation of the 1915 Chōsen Industrial Exhibition; dozens of buildings were sold off and demolished. One such building, Jaseondang, was reassembled in the private home of Japanese businessman Ōkura Kihachirō in Tokyo. More exhibitions continued to be held at the palace afterward, including the 1929 Chōsen Exhibition.

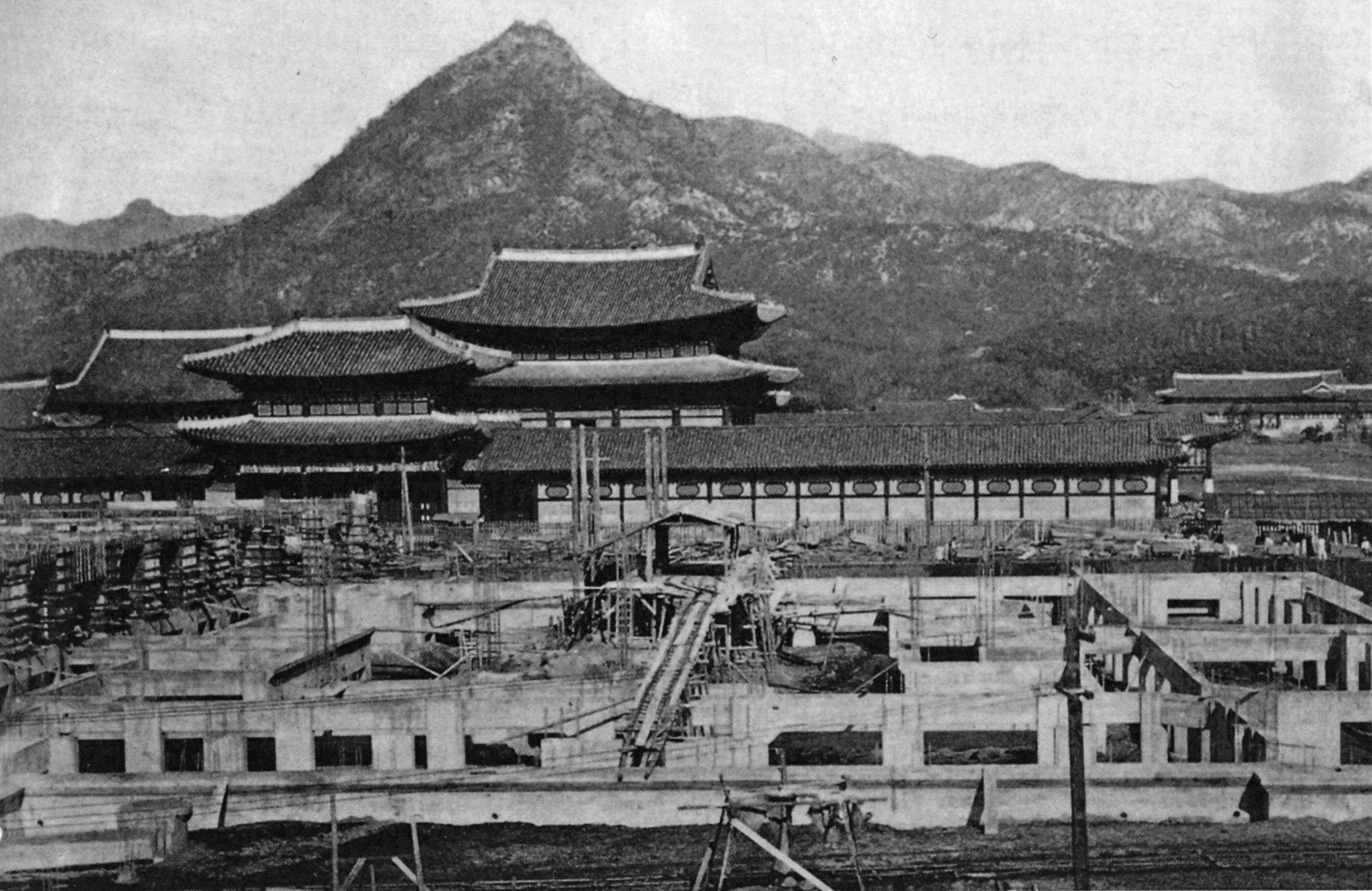
The Government-General of Chōsen Building under construction (1920)

On June 25, 1916, the colonial government began symbolically constructing their new headquarters in the palace: the Government-General of Chōsen Building. Construction would last for around 10 years, until October 1, 1926. The various construction projects in the palace drew from an eclectic mix of modern Western architectural styles. This has been evaluated as attempting to portray Japan as modernizing and open, and Korea as backward and closed.

On November 10, 1917, a major fire at Changdeokgung destroyed much of that palace. The colonial government ordered that many of Gyeongbokgung's buildings be moved to Changdeokgung. In 1938, the final pre-colonial building west and south of Geunjeongjeon, an office building for the Sŏnjŏn'gwan, was demolished.

=== Liberation to First Republic ===
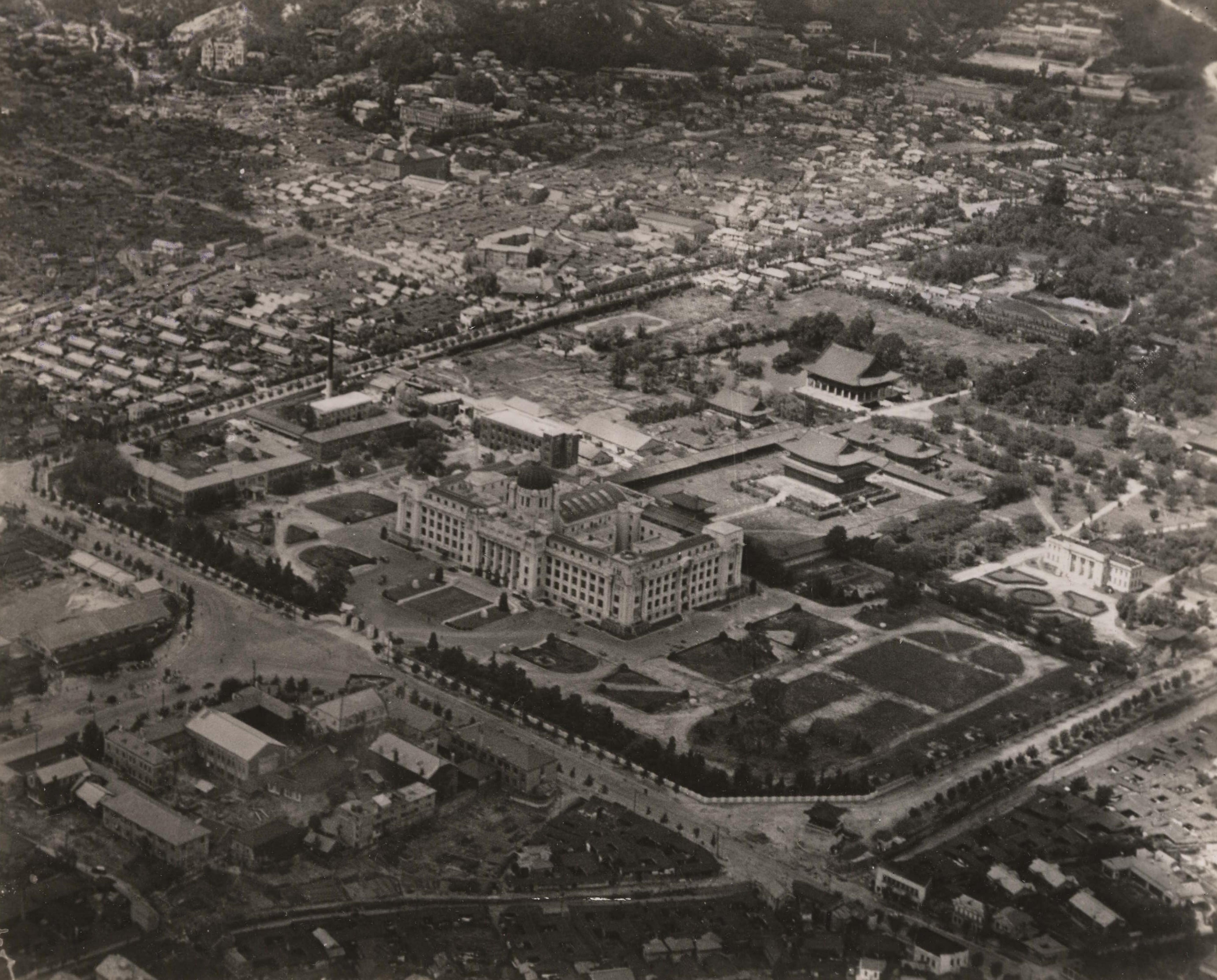
Aerial shot of the palace, weeks after the liberation (September 9, 1945)

Soon after the August 1945 liberation of Korea, the palace continued to be used much as it had been during the colonial period. Voices advocated for the restoration and maintenance of the palace, but these went largely unheeded amidst the chaos of the liberation and division of Korea, as well as the establishment of the United States Army Military Government in Korea (USAMGIK). In September 1945, the USAMGIK headquartered itself in the Government-General of Chōsen Building (which began to be called the "Central Government Building"; CGB; 중앙청; 中央廳) in the palace. That building continued to be used for important functions through the rest of the 1940s, including for a ceremony for the establishment of South Korea.

During the 1950–1953 Korean War, the palace was heavily damaged and even looted. It was only on December 19, 1952, that the Ministry of Culture and Education established a committee to assess and repair the country's historic assets. Even then, maintenance of historical assets was considered a lesser priority compared to restoring the country's basic social services like primary education. After some repairs to the palace, it was reopened to the public in January 1953.

=== Park Chung Hee era ===
Amidst the May 16 coup of 1961, Park Chung Hee seized power in the country. Part of the Capital Defense Command became stationed in the northwest of the palace that year. On January 21, 1963, the palace was made a Historic Site of South Korea. The budget for restoration and maintenance of the palace was tight, so such efforts were often small in scale. Structures like the gates Gwanghwamun and Yeongchumun were recreated, albeit controversially using reinforced concrete and not in their original spots. From the late 1960s to the early 1970s, a building that now houses the National Folk Museum of Korea was constructed.

=== Recent restoration efforts ===
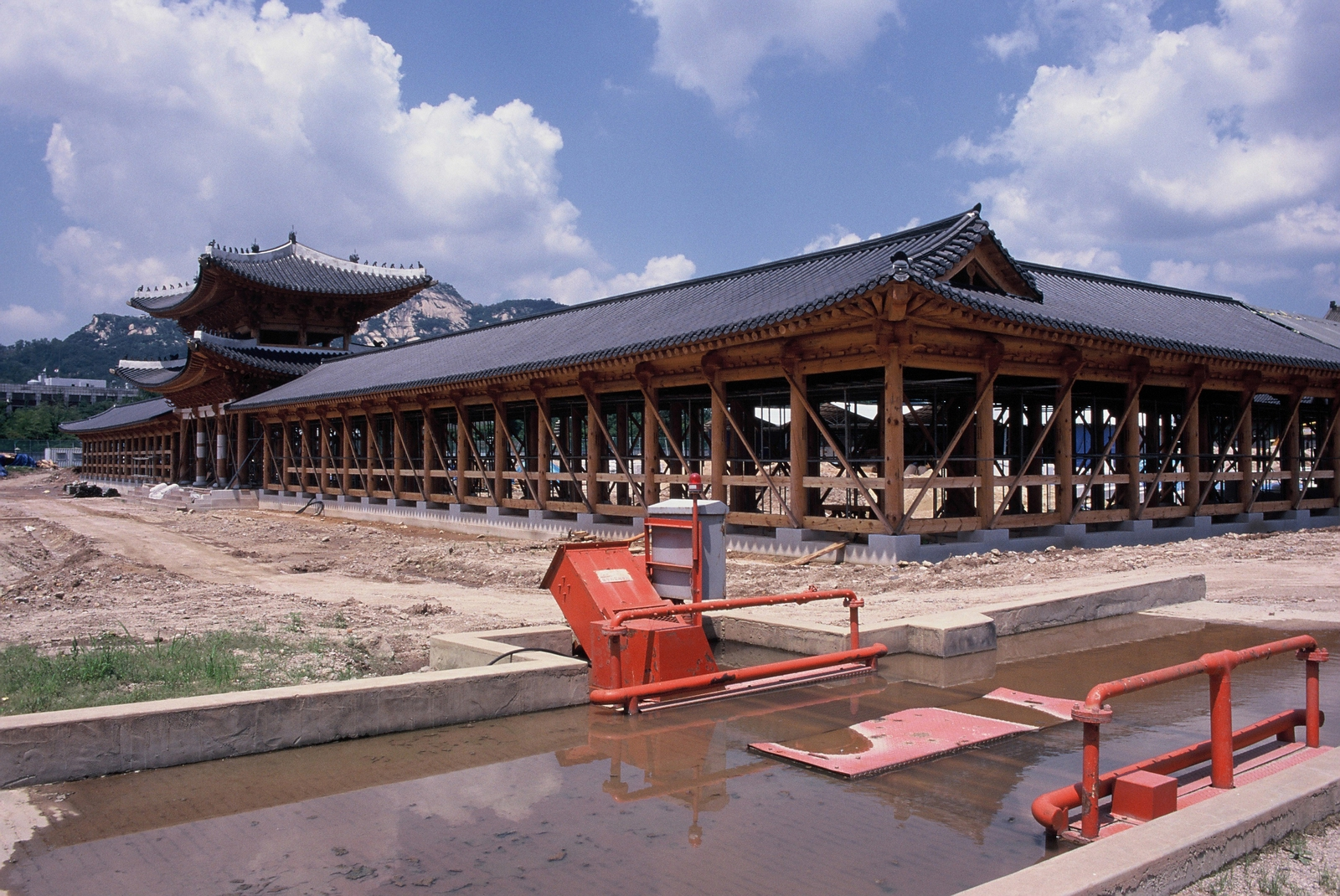
Restoration work in the palace (1999)

The 1980s saw the beginnings of more and higher quality work on preserving South Korean cultural heritage sites. On May 22, 1984, a comprehensive management plan for the palaces was approved that historian Shin Hye-won evaluated as being the first significant post-liberation effort to restore the pre-colonial dignity of the palaces.

In 1990, the First Gyeongbokgung Restoration Plan (경복궁 1차 복원사업) began. The aim was to begin restoring the palace to its Gojong-era state in 1888 (which had around 500 buildings). The plan was to be carried out in five overlapping stages from 1990 to 2009.

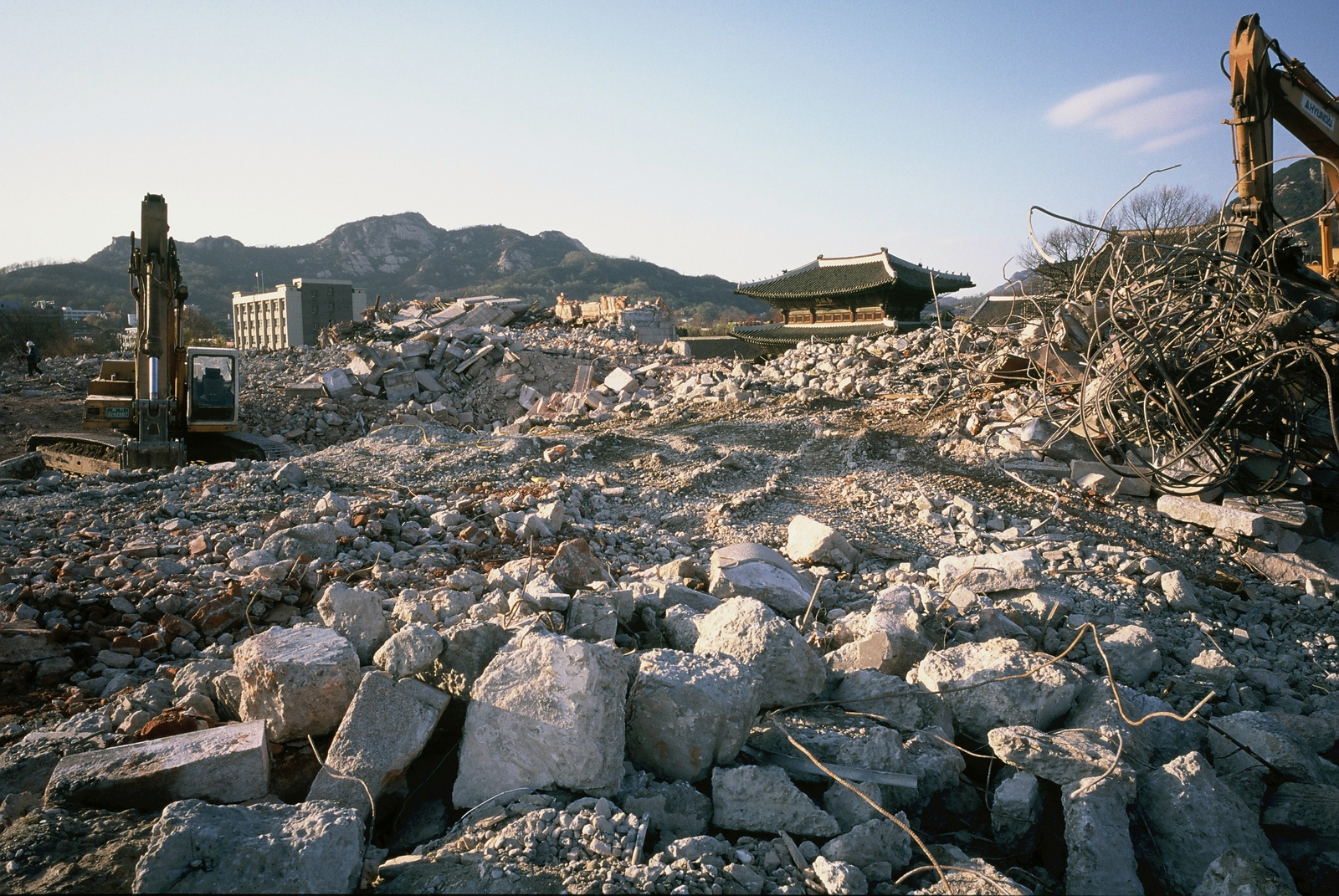
The former Government-General of Chōsen building being demolished (1996)

From 1995 to 1996, the CGB was finally demolished after much public debate. Once it was removed, work began to restore the buildings that formerly occupied its spot. In 1995, the former Government-General of Chōsen Art Museum building was demolished and the remains of Gyeongbokgung's former building Jaseondang (which had been sold and moved to Japan) were returned to Korea. In 1996, the Capital Defense Command buildings were removed. The reenactment of the changing of the guard ceremony began in 2002.

The First Gyeongbokgung Restoration Plan was completed in 2010. It resulted in the restoration of 89 buildings. At that point, the palace had around 25% of its original buildings. The Second Gyeongbokgung Restoration Plan (경복궁 2차 복원기본계획) began in 2010. It is currently set to run until 2045 and to result in the recreation of 90 buildings.

== Design and architecture ==
=== Before the Imjin War ===
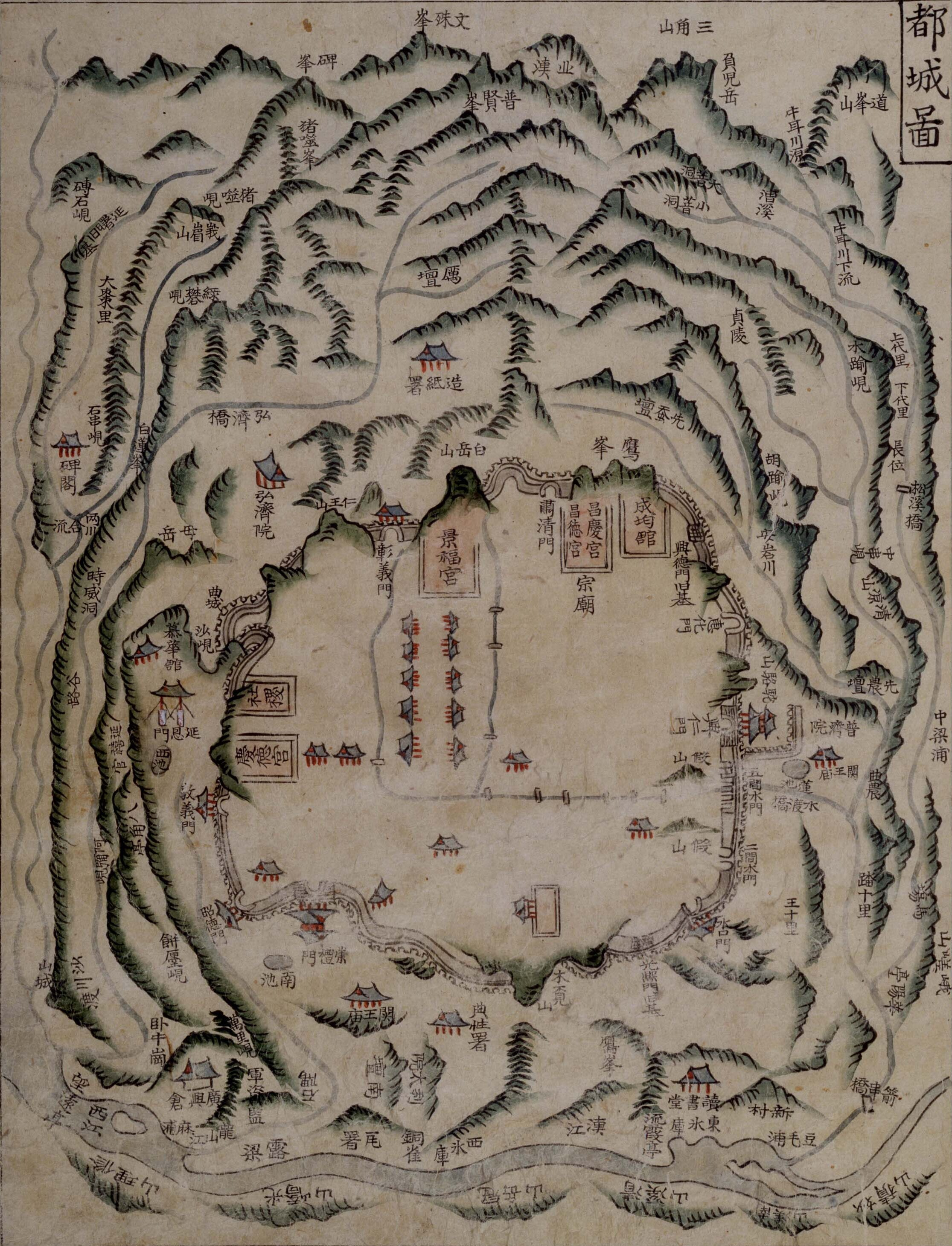
An 18th-century map of the mountains and watersheds around Hanyang, with the rings of surrounding mountains visible

The placement of both Gyeongbokgung and Hanyang considered both practicality and various philosophical traditions. The capital needed to have good access to water transportation, adequate spaces for roads to the rest of Korea, and adequate space for farming. For philosophical traditions, one factor used from the Chinese text Rites of Zhou was placing the ancestral temple on the left, and soil and grain temple on the right. Accordingly, Jongmyo is to the left of the palace and Sajikdan to the right. Another factor from the Rites was placing government offices to the front of the palace and markets to the rear; only the offices were able to be placed like so, as there wasn't enough room behind the palace for markets. Feng shui was also considered. The flow of Korea's mountains and watersheds was analyzed, with one goal being to have the palace with a mountain behind it and water to the front. This corresponds to Bugaksan, Cheonggyecheon, and the Han River. The presence of four surrounding major mountains (Bugaksan, Naksan, Inwangsan, and Namsan (Note: Collectively referred to as naesasan (내사산) or sasinsa (사신사; 四神砂).)) in Hanyang was seen as auspicious and protecting the city. Hanyang also had an outer ring of surrounding mountains (Bukhansan, Achasan, Gwanaksan, and Deogyangsan (Note: Collectively referred to as oesasan (외사산).)), adding to its auspiciousness. Contemporary Korean Buddhist monks then considered the convergence point of three mountains and two rivers to be auspicious sites: Hanyang had Samgaksan, Yongmunsan, and Gwanaksan and the confluence of the rivers Bukhan and Namhan.

The palace's main features are mostly placed symmetrically and along a north–south axis. The palace's initial layout was designed to follow a principle from the Chinese work Kaogongji, part of the Rites of Zhou. That text advocated for palaces to have three gates and three courtyards (삼문삼조; 三門三朝; sammunsamjo) that are to be accessed in sequential order. These were the front gate of the palace Gwanghwamun and first courtyard (외조; 外朝; oejo; used for government offices), Geunjeongmun and second courtyard (치조; 治朝; ch'ijo; used for conducting politics between the king and his subjects), and Hyangomun and third courtyard (연조; 燕朝; yŏnjo; where the king and his family resided).

Chŏng named the palace's main buildings with inspiration from the Book of Documents. The buildings are symbolically named to reflect Neo-Confucian principles. This was in contrast to Goryeo-era ideals and building names, which reflected both Confucian and Buddhist ideals. Furthermore, Chŏng's arguments for the location of the palace, which were primarily based on Neo-Confucianism, were prioritized over the Buddhist arguments of the monk Muhak. These decisions reflected Joseon's prioritization of Confucianism over Buddhism on a state-level.

The reasons why Joseon kings often did not primarily reside in Gyeongbokgung have been analyzed. Im theorized that Changdeokgung was preferred by many kings over Gyeongbokgung because of its more central location in the city, larger area, and less rigid and dense design.

=== Gojong-era reconstruction ===
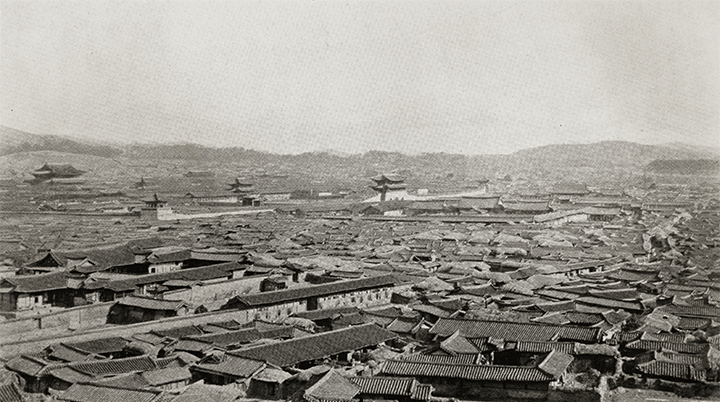
1894 photo of Gyeongbokgung in the distance

The rebuilt palace was designed to reflect various concepts in the I Ching and Taijitushuo, such as yin and yang, the bagua, and the hexagram. New buildings were named by the Yŏnggŏndogam. The palace was densely packed with buildings. Attempts were made to give some of the buildings' roofs blue tiles, like was done in the original palace, but the Goryeo ware techniques needed to create these had been lost during the Imjin War, when the ceramics industry collapsed and many Korean artisans were enslaved and taken to Japan. Ultimately, such tiles were not used in the recreation. Dragon-shaped water spout statues around the palace are likely, in part, symbolic wardens to protect the palace from fire.

There are differing opinions as to the faithfulness of this reconstruction of the pre-war palace. Documents that may have helped recreate the palace had been lost during the Japanese invasions. Several scholars have argued that while the palace's overall layout and major structures were not significantly different from their predecessors, several buildings were original or used differently. Michael Kim evaluated the reconstruction as significantly different.

=== Post-colonial state ===
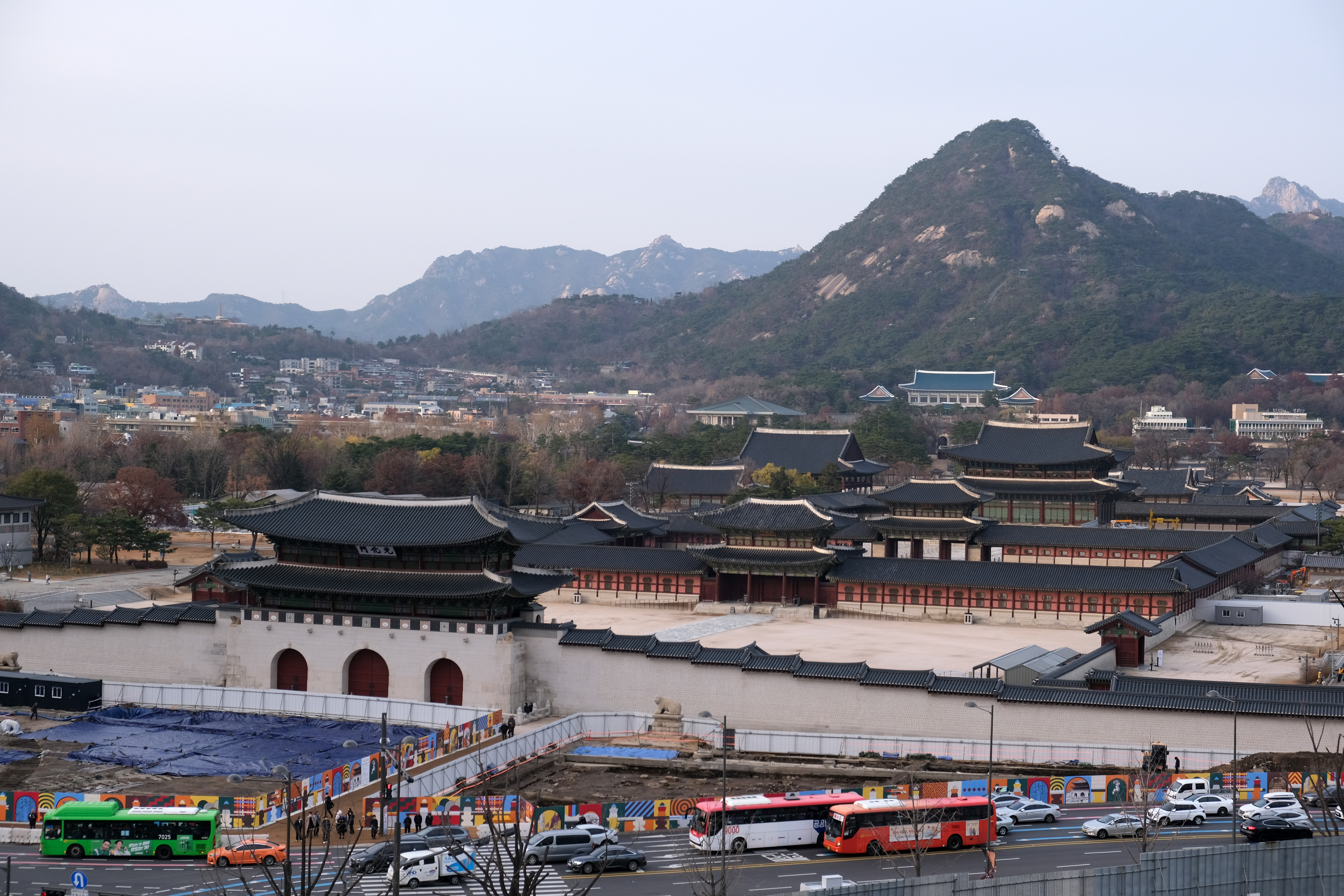
Gyeongbokgung, with the wŏltae being reconstructed at the front

A 2020 report stated that the palace had 9,499 trees of 135 species.

The historical authenticity of the various recreated buildings has been a source of recurring controversy and debate. Authentic recreations are difficult to achieve for a number of reasons. Korean architecture of the Joseon period did not rely on modern-style blueprints, and records of how specific buildings were constructed are often sparse. The styles of such buildings also varied depending on individual craftsmen. Furthermore, some have argued that materials used for construction should be sourced from within Korea itself.

The palace is in a key location in modern Seoul. It is surrounded by numerous important buildings used by the government, military, business, and tourist industry. To its north is the presidential residence the Blue House. To its south are Gwanghwamun Square, the Government Complex, Sejong Center, the Embassy of the United States, and the Embassy of Japan. In addition, various stone monuments around the palace indicate the former sites of historic buildings or events associated with those spots.

== Major landmarks ==
The palace has had a varying number of features and landmarks over time. After the significant alterations and demolitions of the colonial period, efforts are currently ongoing to restore the palace to its pre-colonial state in 1888; around that time the palace had around 500 buildings.

Image	Structure
	Gwanghwamun (광화문; 光化門; Kwanghwamun) The main and south gate. It was completed in the 9th month of 1395. It was named by Sejong in 1426. After being destroyed in 1592 during the Imjin War, it was rebuilt in the 10th month of 1865. In 1923, its wŏltae was destroyed to make way for tram tracks. In 1927, it was relocated north of Geonchunmun, near what is now the National Folk Museum. During the Korean War, its wooden portion completely burned down. In 1968, it was controversially reconstructed using modern materials northwest of its original spot; it then served as the main entrance to the CGB. From 2006 to 2010, it was restored to its pre-colonial state. Its wŏltae was restored in 2023.
	Heungnyemun (흥례문; 興禮門; Hŭngnyemun) Heungnyemun is a gate just to the north of Gwanghwamun. It was demolished in July 1914, and the Government-General of Chōsen Building was built in its place. After that building was demolished, Heungnyemun was reconstructed between 1997 and 2001.
	Yeongjegyo (영제교; 永濟橋; Yŏngjegyo) A kŭmch'ŏn'gyo (bridge over a kŭmch'ŏn) to the north of Gwanghwamun. It passes over the stream Myeongdangsu and is made of stone. Passing the bridge was seen as ceremonially entering the inner sanctum of the palace. It was likely completed in 1395. It was named in 1426. In 1916, during the construction of the Government-General of Chōsen Building, Yeongjegyo was disassembled and its remains moved to the west of the Government-General Museum of Chōsen. In the 1950s, it was installed in front of Sujeongjeon. It was again moved to the west of Geonchunmun in the 1970s. It was restored to its original location in 1996, 1997, or 2001. It is around 10 m (33 ft) wide and 13 m (43 ft) long.
	Geunjeongmun (근정문; 勤政門; Kŭnjŏngmun; 'Governing Diligently Gate') The third gate of the three gate system, entrance to the ch'ijo and main hall, (Note: Such gates are called chŏnmun (전문; 殿門).) and a designated Treasure. It was built in 1395. After being destroyed in 1592, it was rebuilt in 1867. The gate has survived in this state to the present. It is flanked by two smaller gates, Ilhwamun (일화문; 日華門) and Wolhwamun (월화문; 月華門; Wŏrhwamun), which were named in 1426. It has two stories and a staircase between Ilhwamun and Geunjeongmun.
	Geunjeongjeon (근정전; 勤政殿; Kŭnjŏngjŏn; 'Governing Diligently Hall') The main hall (Note: In Korean, chŏngjŏn (정전; 正殿).) of the palace and a designated National Treasure. It was used for major events like ceremonies and the issuing of edicts. It was completed in 1395. Five kings were crowned here, including Sejong in 1418. It was destroyed in 1592 and reconstructed in 1867. It has remained in much the same form to the present. It is the largest main hall of all Joseon palaces and is regarded as exemplary of late-Joseon architecture. Like other Joseon main halls, it has a wŏltae in front used for ceremonies.
	Gyeonghoeru (경회루; 慶會樓; Kyŏnghoeru; 'Virtuous Meeting Building') An elevated hall on an artificial island in an artificial pond. The hall was meant for hosting banquets for dignitaries. It is a designated National Treasure. It was first completed in the 4th month of 1412. The original form was smaller than the current. It was destroyed in 1592 and rebuilt in 1867. This form has remained to the present. The building has 35 rooms that are supported by stone pillars. The building's features symbolize a number of concepts in numerology.
	Sujeongjeon (수정전; 修政殿; Sujŏngjŏn; 'Skillful Statecraft Hall') A building used by various government offices over time, and a designated Treasure. It was a key facility involved in the invention of Hangul. It was destroyed in 1592 and rebuilt in 1867. This form of the building has largely persisted to the present. From 1966 to 1975, it was occupied by a predecessor to the National Folk Museum. Unusually for a side hall, it has a large wŏltae. It has rear chimneys, which likely allowed for the use of ondol heated floors.
	Amisan (아미산; 峨嵋山) A garden constructed using soil excavated during the construction of Gyeonghoeru's pond. Chimneys in the garden are designated Treasures.
	Jagyeongjeon (자경전; 慈慶殿; Chagyŏngjŏn) A designated Treasure. It was in Jagyeongjeon that the 1873 fire began; the fire destroyed the building. It was again destroyed in the 1876 fire. During the colonial period, it was used as a museum office. During the 1929 Chōsen Exhibition, it was surrounded by various exhibition buildings and a children's theme park. Its decorated chimney is also a designated Treasure.
	Jaseondang (자선당; 資善堂; Chasŏndang). One of the main buildings used for the education of the crown prince. It was first built in 1427. It was destroyed in 1592 and rebuilt in 1865. It was again destroyed in the 1867 fire, and was rebuilt by 1888. In 1914, the building was sold and later reassembled in the private home of a Japanese businessman Ōkura Kihachirō in Tokyo. It was destroyed in the 1923 Great Kantō earthquake. Its remains were returned to Korea around 1996, and are now on display near Geoncheonggung. In 2001, Jaseondang was rebuilt on its original spot.
	Hyangwonjeong (향원정; 香遠亭; Hyangwŏnjŏng; 'Far-spreading Fragrance Pavilion') A pavilion on an island in the pond Hyangwonji (향원지; 香遠池). It was built sometime between 1867 and 1873. The island's bridge, Chwihyanggyo (취향교; 醉香橋; Ch'wihyanggyo; 'Intoxicated by Fragrance Bridge'), was completed in 1873. It was the longest wooden bridge built over a pond during the Joseon period. The bridge was initially located to the north of the pavilion, but after it was destroyed by a bombing during the 1950–1953 Korean War, it was rebuilt to the south side in 1953. In 2021, the 1953 bridge was demolished, rebuilt as a wooden bridge, and restored to its original location.
	Gonnyeonghap (곤녕합; 坤寧閤; Konnyŏnghap) A building in the west side of the Geoncheonggung area of the palace. This building was the location of the 1895 assassination of Empress Myeongseong.

=== Other landmarks ===
The National Palace Museum of Korea is located in a modern three-story building on the southwestern part of the palace grounds. Its collection aggregates various artifacts from the former Korean royal family. The National Folk Museum of Korea is housed in a modern-style building in the eastern part of the palace. It has three floors above ground and one below. This museum's building is set to be demolished in 2026 and the museum relocated to Sejong City. The pre-colonial buildings that used to occupy its spot will then be restored.

== Tourism ==
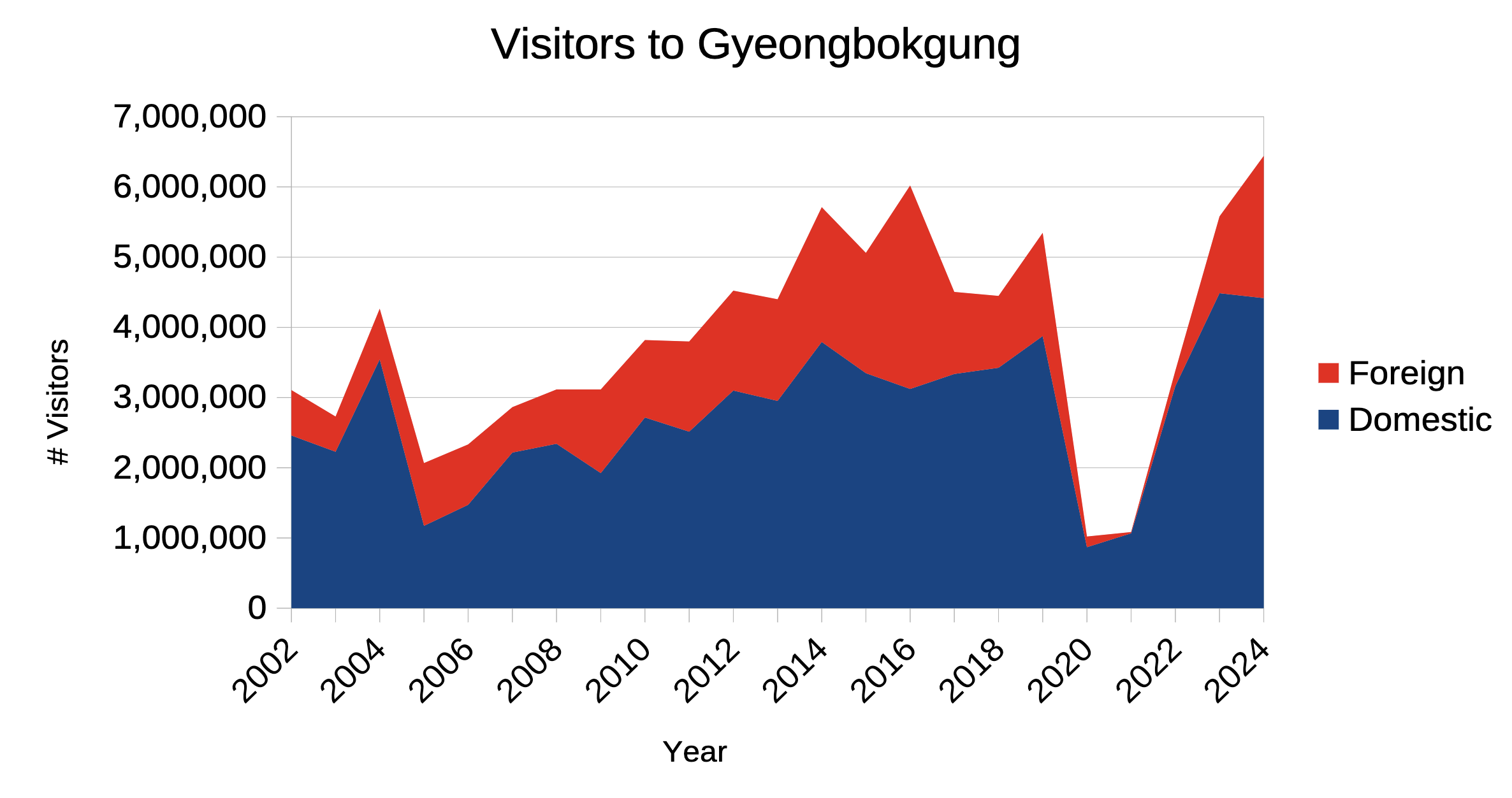
Gyeongbokgung visitor statistics (2002–)

The palace is considered among the most significant and representative tourist sites of South Korea, and even a symbol of pre-modern Korea as a whole.

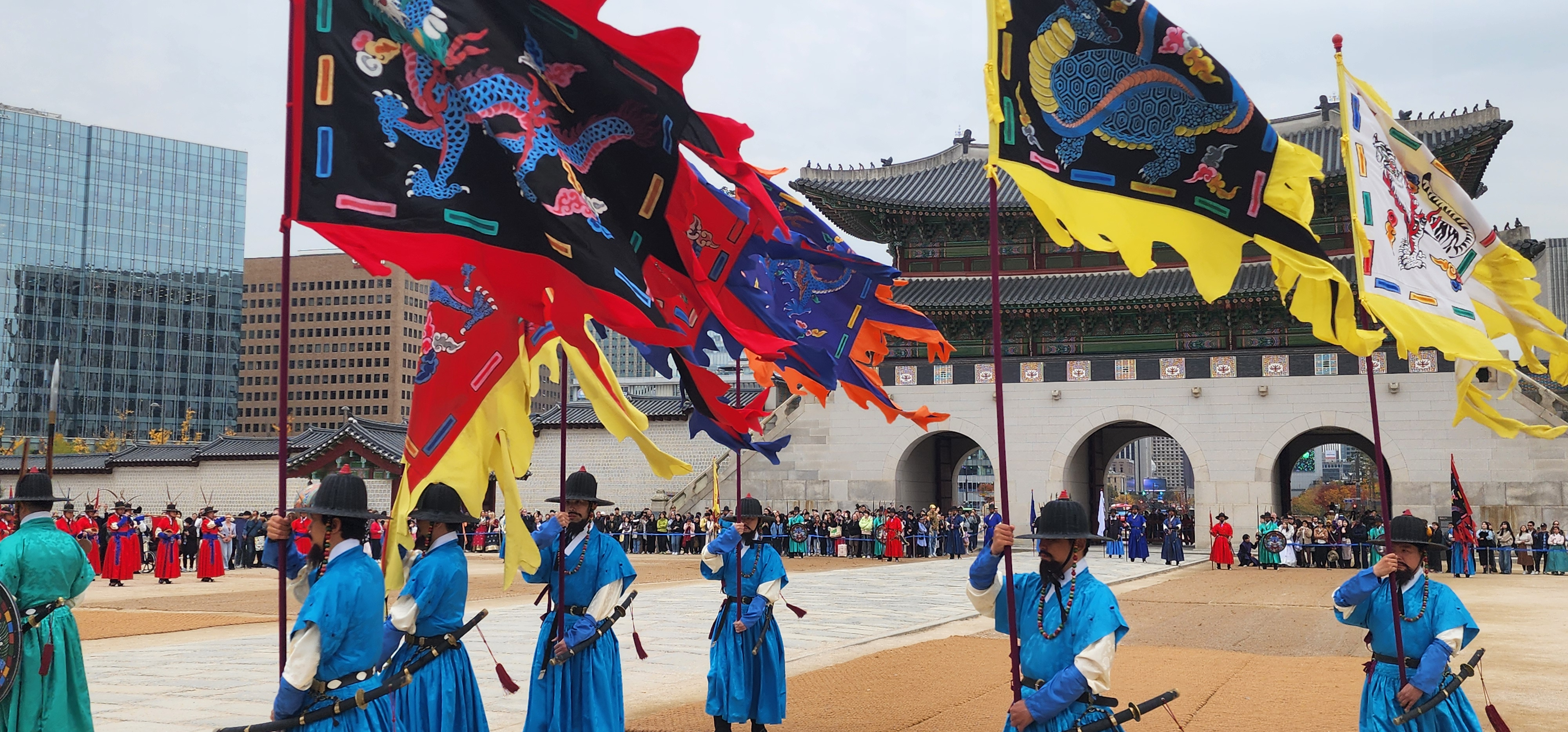
A changing of the guard ceremony was revived in 1996 for the benefit of tourists.

According to data from the Korea Culture & Tourism Institute, from July 2005 to December 2024, the palace had a total of 56,030,499 visitors, more than any other tourist site in Seoul. In 2017, it was the second-most visited tourist site in the country, after the amusement park Everland. A 2021 study on 24,008 non–Korean language reviews of South Korean tourist destinations on the travel website Tripadvisor concluded that foreign tourists visited Gyeongbokgung the most out of any tourist attraction in South Korea. According to statistics gathered by the government agency Korea Heritage Service, from 2002 to 2020 and 2022 to 2024, Gyeongbokgung was the most visited palace in Seoul.

In 2010, the palace began opening at night for a number of days each year for visitors. It began as a one-time event for the G-20 Seoul summit, but was made a reoccurring feature after its success. The night openings were highly popular for both foreign and domestic visitors of varying ages, whereas the palaces had mostly appealed to foreigners or elderly domestic visitors before. From 2016 to 2024, at least 100,000 visitors per year attended a nighttime viewing. In 2013, admission began to be made free for visitors that wore hanbok (traditional Korean clothing). This led to a significant proliferation of hanbok rental businesses near the palace. In 2024, 1.8 million visitors to Gyeongbokgung wore hanbok. The palace has since offered a number of experiences for limited numbers of guests, such as dinners of Korean royal court cuisine and performances of traditional music.

== In art and media ==
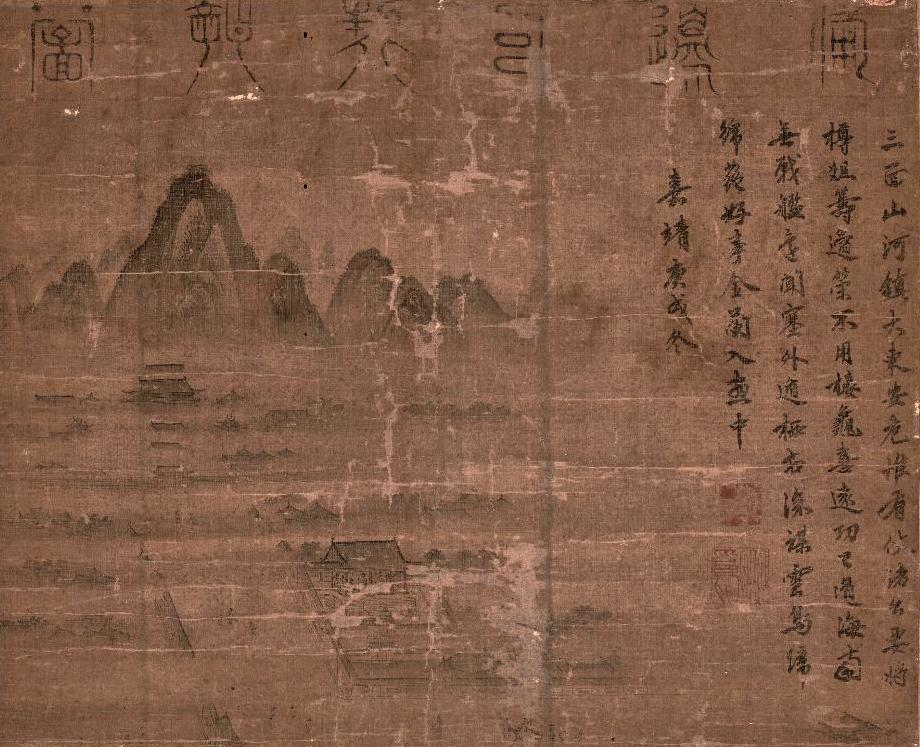
A section of a 1550 painting (Note: Entitled Pibyŏnsa kyehoedo) depicting Gyeongbokgung, obscured in fog and in the distance (on the left)

There are not many surviving depictions of any Korean palaces from before the Imjin War. In both Korea and China around that time, depicting the extravagance of the palace was frowned upon; relishing luxury was seen as inviting the end of the dynasty. Drawings of palaces were often simple diagrams used for illustrative purposes, and not detailed architectural records or artistic depictions. Fourteen simple diagrams of the palace's layout from before the war have survived to the present, although most are presumed to be later copies of earlier drawings. (Note: All have titles with variations of the term Kyŏngbokkungdo (경복궁도; 景福宮圖). It is debated when each of them were produced, what information they are based on, what period of the palace's history they are depicting, and how accurate they are.) The first known detailed illustration of the palace was the 1506 Hanyang kunggwŏldo (한양 궁궐도; 漢陽宮闕圖), but it was destroyed during the Imjin War, and copies of it are not known to exist. The creator of that painting wrote that their painting was the first of its kind to their knowledge. By the late Joseon period, when palaces were depicted artistically, they were often obscured by clouds or shadow, or drawn with little detail. The situation began to change in the mid-18th century. Detailed architectural records began to be kept in texts like the Uigwe, and more artistic depictions of palaces emerged.

There are three known extant paintings of Yeongjo holding events at the ruins of the palace in the 18th century.

Paegakch'unhyo is a series of two landscape paintings by An Jung-sik of the palace produced in 1915, during the colonial period. The paintings likely symbolically depict the palace before its colonial-era modifications as an expression of Korean independence activism. They are designated Registered Cultural Heritages.

The South Korean 10,000 won note featured an image of Geunjeongjeon on its reverse from 1973 to 1983. From 1983 to 2007, it featured an image of Gyeonghoeru.

== See also ==
- Imperial City of Huế
- Forbidden City
- Tokyo Imperial Palace
- Kyoto Imperial Palace
- Potala Palace
- Manwŏltae
