= Heungnyemun =

Gate of Gyeongbokgung in Seoul, South Korea

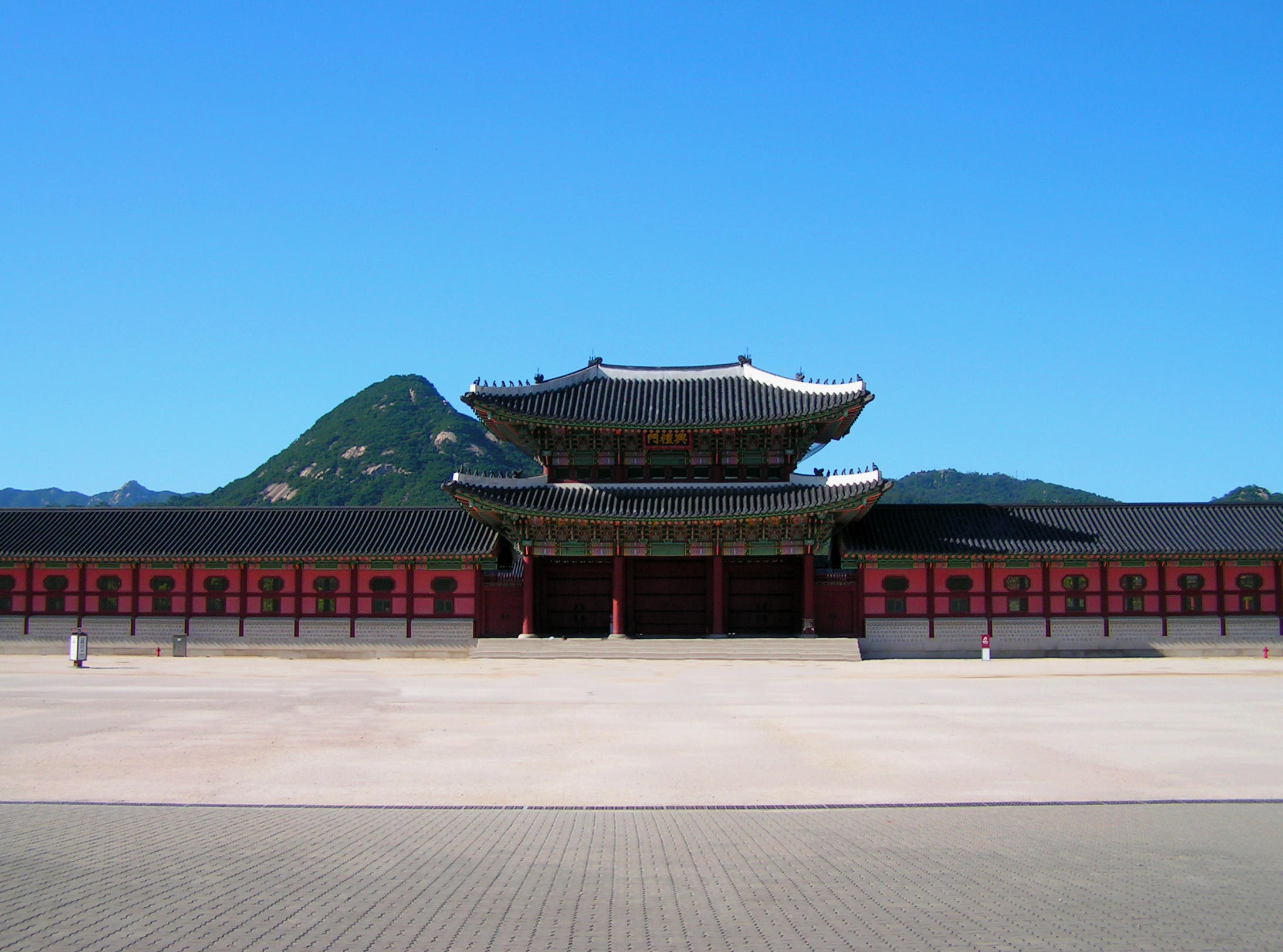
- The gate (2005)

General information
- Coordinates: 37°34′37″N 126°58′37″E

Korean name
- Hangul: 흥례문
- Hanja: 興禮門
- RR: Heungnyemun
- MR: Hŭngnyemun

Heungnyemun (Korean: 흥례문; Hanja: 興禮門) is a gate of the palace Gyeongbokgung in Seoul, South Korea.

== History ==
Heungnyemun is the second gate of the three gate system and entrance to the oejo (외조; 外朝; the outermost and most public-facing part of Joseon palaces). It was originally called Jeongmun (정문; 正門; Chŏngmun), and was named Hongnyemun (홍례문; 弘禮門) in 1426. After it was reconstructed, it received its current name. The name change was to avoid using an identical Hanja character as was used in the birth name of the Chinese Qianlong Emperor. It was demolished in July 1914 for the Chōsen Industrial Exhibition. In its place was built the temporary Exhibition Building No. 1, which was completed by 1915. In 1916, the Government-General of Chōsen Building began to be built in its place. After that building was demolished, Heungnyemun was reconstructed between September 11, 1997 to October 26, 2001.
