= Yongmunsan (Gyeonggi) =

Mountain in Gyeonggi Province in South Korea

Highest point
- Elevation: 1,157.2 m (3,797 ft)
- Coordinates: 37°33′40″N 127°32′48″E

Geography
- Location: South Korea

Korean name
- Hangul: 용문산
- Hanja: 龍門山
- RR: Yongmunsan
- MR: Yongmunsan

Yongmunsan (Korean: 용문산) is a mountain in Yangpyeong County, Gyeonggi Province in South Korea. It has an elevation of 1,157.2 m (3,797 ft).

== See also ==
- List of mountains in Korea
