= Geunjeongmun =

Gate of Gyeongbokgung in Seoul, South Korea

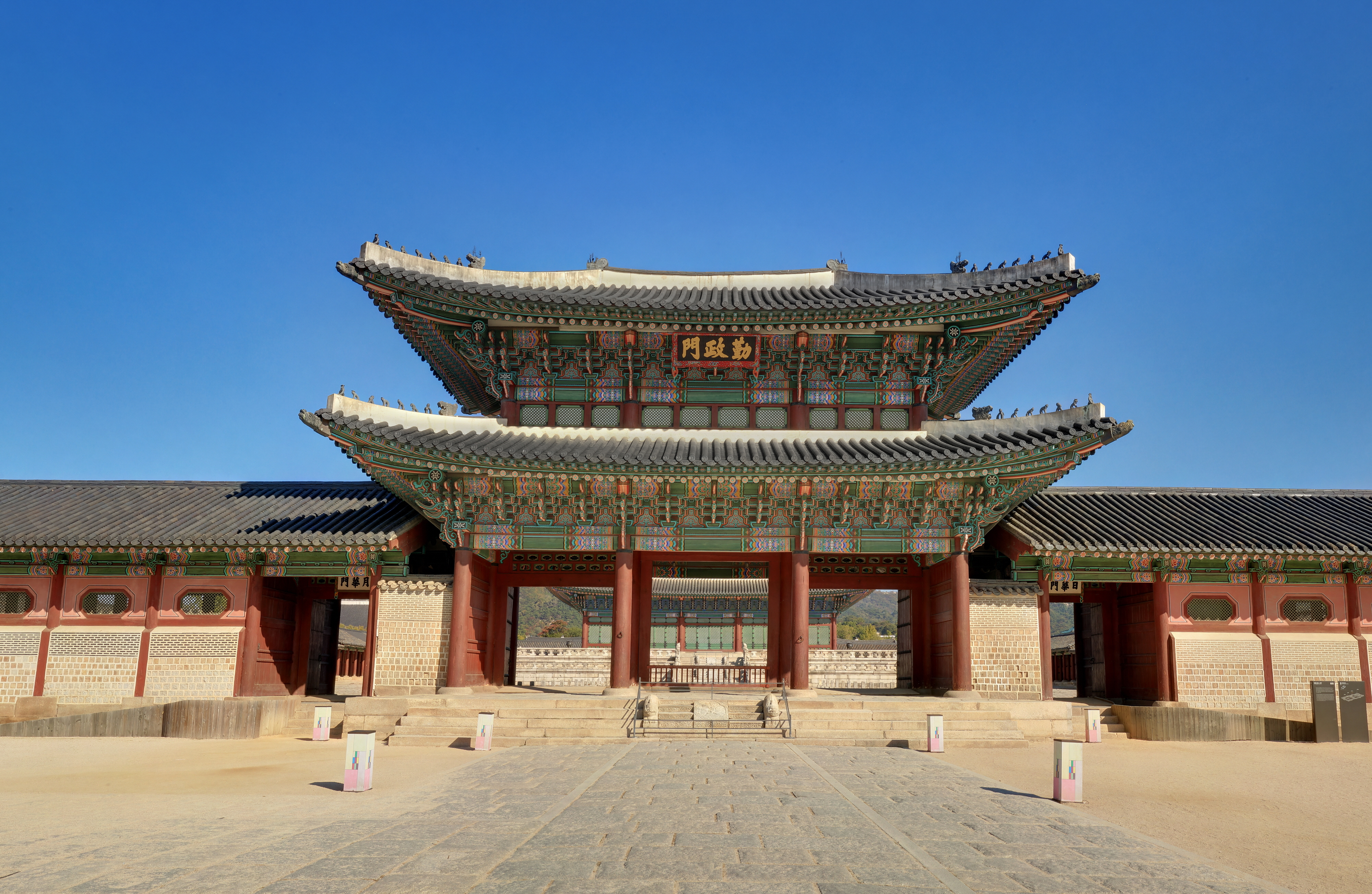
- The gate

Design and construction
- Designations

Treasures of South Korea
- Official name: Geunjeongmun Gate and Corridor of Gyeongbokgung Palace
- Designated: 1985-01-08

Korean name
- Hangul: 근정문
- Hanja: 勤政門
- RR: Geunjeongmun
- MR: Kŭnjŏngmun

Geunjeongmun (Korean: 근정문; Hanja: 勤政門) is a building in Seoul, South Korea. It is the southern gate of Geunjeongjeon, the main gate of Gyeongbokgung.

== History ==
Built in 1395, it was lost during the Japanese invasion of Korea. The gate was restored in 1876 when the palace was rebuilt. Geunjeongmun held major national ceremonies during the Joseon period.

== Structure ==
Geunjeongmun is a two-kan building consisting of three bays in front and two bays in side. There is a roof that looks trapezoidal when viewed from the front. The material shows an outwardly extended shape, which shows the sharp and curved architectural style of the late Joseon Dynasty.

== Transport ==
- Gyeongbokgung Station (Seoul Subway Line 3)
- Gwanghwamun Station (Seoul Subway Line 5)
- City Hall Station (Seoul Subway Line 1 and Seoul Subway Line 2)

== See also ==
- Gwanghwamun Plaza
- Statue of King Sejong
- Chŏng Tojŏn
- Gyeongbokgung
- Cheonggyecheon
- Bugaksan
