= Expo '29 =

Expo '29 may refer to:

- 1929 Barcelona International Exposition, Barcelona
- Chosun Exhibition, Seoul
- Ibero-American Exposition of 1929, Seville
- North East Coast Exhibition, Newcastle upon Tyne, England
