= History of Gyeongbokgung =

History of the Korean palace

Gyeongbokgung (Korean: 경복궁; Hanja: 景福宮; pronounced [kjʌŋbok̚k͈uŋ]) is a former royal palace in Seoul, South Korea. It was the first royal palace of the Joseon dynasty, having been established in 1395.

The palace was among the first landmarks to be established in Seoul. It flourished under the 1418–1450 reign of Sejong the Great, who invented the native Korean script Hangul at the palace. In 1592, amidst the Imjin War, the palace was completely burned down. Plans to repair the palace fell through amidst funding shortages after the war. It would not be restored until the late 19th century, during the reign of the penultimate monarch Gojong.

In 1910, Japan colonized Korea. As the palace was a symbol of the Korean monarchy's authority, Japan systematically demolished and altered it. Almost all of its around 500 structures were sold off and demolished. In their place, modern-style buildings like the Government-General of Chōsen Building were established. Significant efforts to restore the palace began in the 1980s. Since then, the 1990–2010 First Gyeongbokgung Restoration Plan and 2008–2045 Second Gyeongbokgung Restoration Plan have attempted to restore the palace to its pre-colonial state. Dozens of buildings and structures in the palace have since been recreated, with dozens more scheduled for the future.

== Establishment ==
After establishing Joseon in 1392 (Korean calendar), the founding king Taejo (r. 1392–1398) began work in establishing a new capital for his state. Kwŏn Chunghwa, an expert in feng shui, was placed in charge of choosing the location of the capital. In 1392, he chose a site near the mountain Gyeryongsan in South Chungcheong Province. After facing opposition, in the 8th month of 1394, it was decided that Hanyang (now "Seoul") would be the capital. There was fierce debate over where the palace and city proper should be, with eight candidate sites in the region identified. One proposed location for the palace was slightly north of its current location on the site of a Goryeo-era palace now called Namgyŏng Igung (남경 이궁; 南京離宮), but it was decided that the space was too small.

The location was finalized by the 1st day, 9th month of 1394, Taejo established a temporary office (Note: Sindogunggwŏljosŏngdogam (신도궁궐조성도감; 新都宮闕造成都監)) dedicated to designing Hanyang and establishing a new palace for it. Construction began on it in the 12th month. Workers were gathered from around the region: 4,500 from west and 5,500 from east Gyeonggi Province, as well as 5,500 from Chungcheong Province. The palace was completed in the 25th day, 9th month of 1395. The palace's original scale, while smaller and less developed than its later form, is difficult to precisely determine; varying estimates have been provided. Various scholars have claimed that it had 390 rooms (칸; k'an) or 755 rooms. On the 28th day, 12th month, Taejo moved into the palace. Around that time, the palace walls (궁성; 宮城; kungsŏng or 궁장; 宮牆; kungjang) did not yet exist. Construction began on them in either 1397 or 1398. They were completed in 1399 or 1400. Amidst the 1398 First Strife of the Princes, Joseon's capital was changed to Kaegyŏng (now Kaesong), then back to Hanyang in 1905. The palace was abandoned for about ten years.

In 1404, King Taejong (r. 1400–1418) ordered that the palace Changdeokgung be established in Hanyang. Upon his return to the city in 1405, he began to reside in that palace. In 1406, he began efforts to repair Gyeongbokgung. In the 9th month of 1411, Taejong had a nearby stream Myeongdangsu (명당수; 明堂水; Myŏngdangsu) redirected into the palace, making it a kŭmch'ŏn (palace stream). He also had a pond dug out and in 1412 constructed the pavilion Gyeonghoeru. Around this time, the gwageo (civil service examinations) began to be held in the palace. Despite these efforts, Taejong functionally avoided Gyeongbokgung and resided in Changdeokgung. Architect Im Seok-jae theorized that this was because he associated the site with unpleasant memories from political turmoil and thought some of its feng shui qualities ominous. Until the Imjin War, Taejong and his successors had Gyeongbokgung as their official palace (법궁; 法宮; pŏpkung), but had secondary palaces (이궁; 離宮; igung) that they often resided in more or moved between.

== Before the Imjin War ==
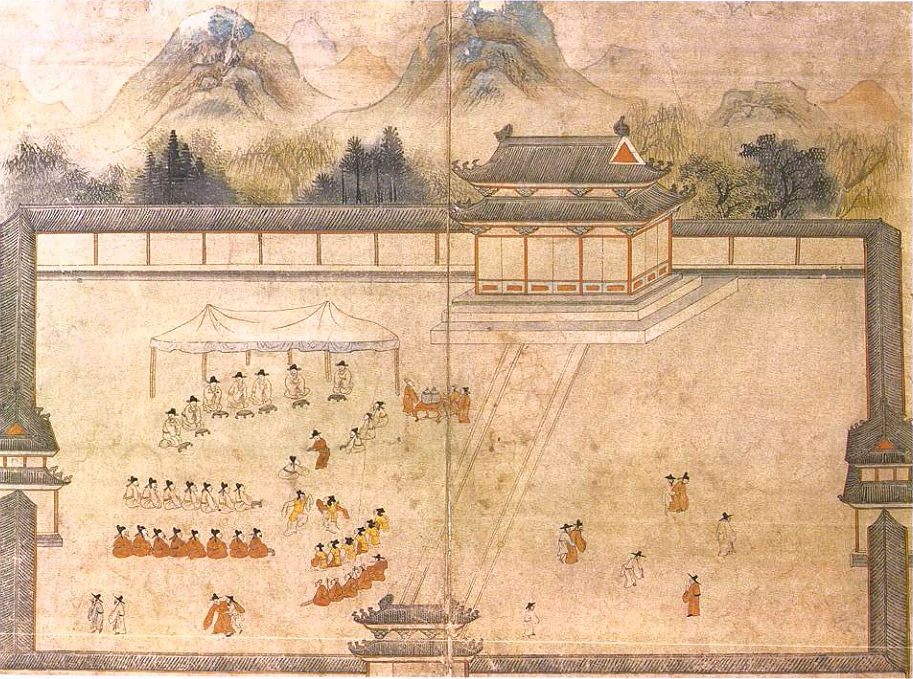
A reproduction of a painting (Note: Entitled Chungmyojosŏyŏgwansayŏndo (중묘조서여관사연도; 中廟朝書筵官賜宴圖), from the collection Ŭiryŏng namssiga chŏnhwach'ŏp.) of a 1535 banquet at Geunjeongjeon

In 1421, Sejong the Great (r. 1418–1450) made Gyeongbokgung his primary palace. By 1427, he officially moved out of Changdeokgung, although he moved between them often. Sejong greatly renovated and expanded the palace. It was during Sejong's reign that Gyeongbokgung became fully-fledged and functional. Under Sejong, the palace hosted a number of scientific devices, including the water clock Borugak Jagyeongnu, a facility for producing movable type, and the astronomical observatory Ganuidae. The palace was then host to the Hall of Worthies and Ŏnmunch'ŏng, which assisted Sejong in developing Hangul.

The palace remained in much the same form from Sejong's reign for around a hundred years. Sejong's son Sejo moved out of Gyeongbokgung and preferred Changdeokgung. Gyeongbokgung saw use especially for events and hosting foreign dignitaries. In 1461, the office Suridogam (수리도감; 修理都監) was put in charge of maintainining and restoring the palace. The palace experienced a fire on the 15th day, 12th month of 1467. In the 9th month of 1528, the palace was extensively renovated.

On the 14th day, 9th month of 1553, the palace experienced a major fire. The fire destroyed much of the inner palace area (편전; 便殿; p'yŏnjŏn; where the king conducted daily private politics, and 침전; 寢殿; ch'imjŏn; the king's bedchambers). In that area of the palace, only the main hall Geunjeongjeon was left standing. Numerous treasures, books, records, royal seals, clothing, and even horses that had been in the royal family for generations were lost. In the aftermath of the fire, the royal family moved to Changdeokgung. Repairs began in the 3rd month of 1554. They were overseen by a temporary office (대내선수도감; 大內繕修都監; Taenaesŏnsudogam). 2,200 soldiers and monks and 1,500 paid workers were mobilized for the effort. Repairs were completed by the 18th day, 9th month of that year.

== Destruction and disuse ==
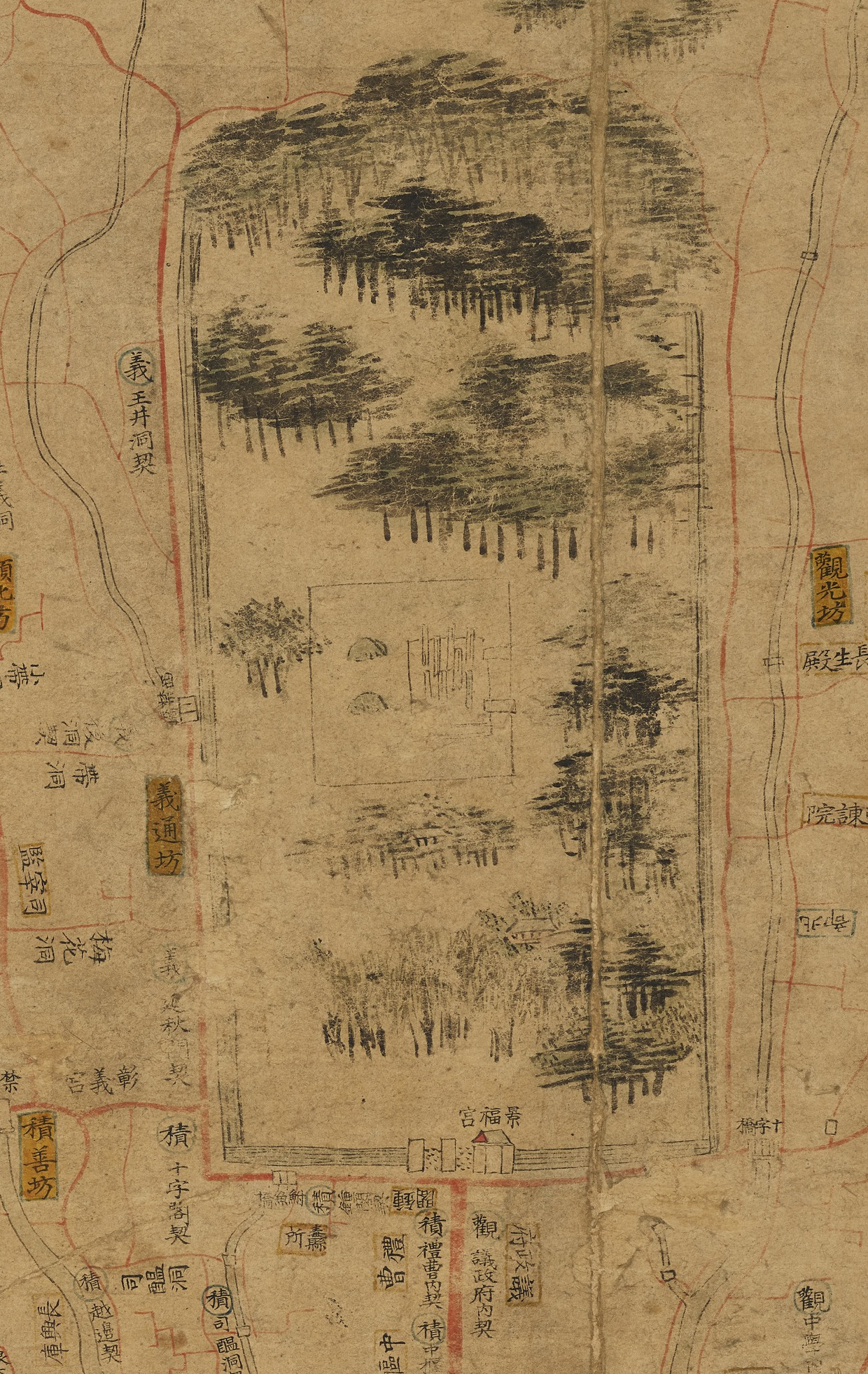
Gyeongbokgung in the 18th-century map Tosŏngdaejido.

In the 4th month of 1592, during the 1592–1598 Imjin War, Gyeongbokgung and the other two palaces in the city were completely burned down. It is debated who burned down the palaces, as surviving contemporary records are from intellectuals who did not witness the burnings. Various contemporary Korean texts, including the Veritable Records of Seonjo, report hearsay that it was Korean commoners who burned down the palace to destroy palace records. When the Japanese invaders entered the city on the 2nd day, 5th month of that year, Gyeongbokgung was still intact. Japanese discipline in the city was reportedly initially high, but when they began suffering defeats, they took their frustrations out on the city and locals, burning buildings and killing.

King Seonjo (r. 1567–1608) had escaped Hanyang before the Japanese entered it. Upon his return to the city in 1593, he stayed in a temporary palace (which later became Deoksugung). The government department Ch'unch'ugwan researched Gyeongbokgung's past form and history using Joseon's extensive historical records, such as the Uigwe. (Note: One part of the Uigwe, entitled Kyŏngbokkungjosŏngŭigwe (경복궁조성의궤; 景福宮造成儀軌), documents construction on Gyeongbokgung that occurred during the reign of King Seongjong.) By 1606, plans had been drawn up for the palace's reconstruction. However, Joseon's economy was still recovering from the devastating war and finances were tight; Gyeongbokgung's reconstruction was indefinitely postponed and the state's resources were mostly focused on rebuilding Changdeokgung. At least one of Seonjo's advisors argued that Gyeongbokgung was inauspicious and that it should be deemphasized, although finances were likely the dominant constraint.

Instead of rebuilding Gyeongbokgung, Seonjo's successor King Gwanghaegun (r. 1608–1623) rebuilt Changdeokgung and Changgyeonggung and made the palaces Ingyeonggung and Gyeongdeokgung. For around 270 years afterwards, Gyeongbokgung went mostly unused and undeveloped. Guards were stationed at the ruins to ensure that its raw materials would not be scavenged. Over time, various kings expressed interest in rebuilding the palace, but did not act on this, due to financial constraints and the other palaces in the city being sufficient. There are a number of contemporary poems about literati visiting the ruins of the palace and appreciating the nature of the site, which had forests and flowers. In the 5th month of 1706, King Sukjong (r. 1674–1720) ordered that the palace's walls be repaired. He hosted a banquet for 150 elderly civilians at the palace in the 9th month of 1706.

King Yeongjo (r. 1724–1776) took a particular interest in the palace. He researched its history and saw its symbolic value. He stored various spirit tablets there and held ancestral rituals (진작례; 進爵禮; chinjangnye). He also held a number of ceremonies at the palace. The first such event was in 1747. The next event he held was in 1763, and thereafter many more followed. He hosted the gwageo at the palace at least 17 times. In 1767 and 1772, two pigak (memorial stele under a pavilion) were built in the palace.

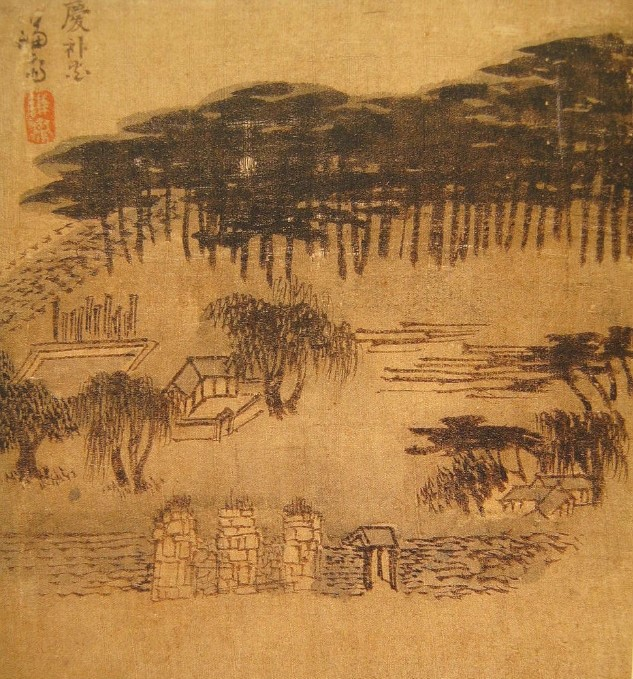
A painting (Note: Entitled Kyŏngbokkungdo (경복궁도; 景福宮圖) by Jeong Seon.) of the palace's ruins in the mid-18th century. Gyeonghoeru's ruins can be seen to the left. The other building is possibly Gangnyeongjeon or Gyotaejeon.

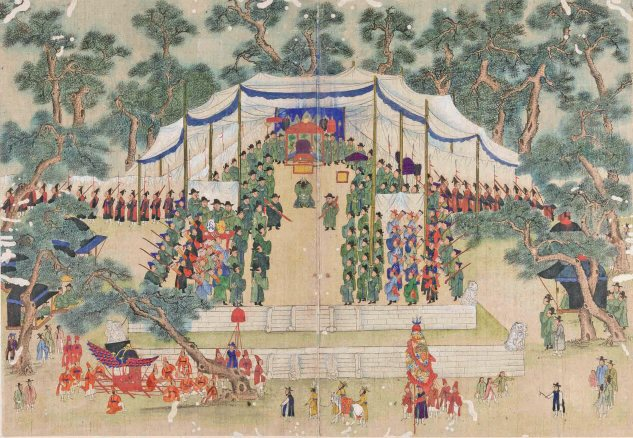
A painting (Note: Painting entitled Yŏngmyojogugwŏljinjakto (영묘조구궐진작도; 英廟朝舊闕進爵圖), originally from the text Kyŏngimurhwe (경이물훼; 敬而勿毁).) of Yeongjo hosting a banquet on the former site of Geunjeongjeon at the palace (1767)

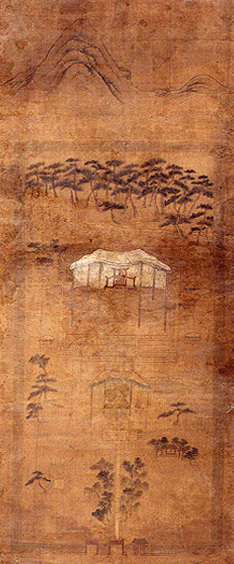
A painting (Note: From a byeongpung (painted screen) entitled Ch'illim kwanghwamunnae kŭnjŏngjŏn chŏngsisido.) of a stylized representation of the palace ruins during one of Yeongjo's events (1747)

== Reconstruction ==
On the 2nd day, 4th month of 1865, Queen Sinjeong, regent of the penultimate Korean monarch King Gojong (r. 1864–1907), ordered that the palace be reconstructed. (Note: In 2018, the Seoul Historiography Institute found nine volumes of a text called Kyŏngbokkung yŏnggŏn ilgi (경복궁영건일기; 景福宮營建日記) in the library of Japan's Waseda University. The text thoroughly documents every day of the reconstruction process. A full retranslation of the text into modern Korean was published in 2019.) The following day, the government department Yŏnggŏndogam (영건도감) was established to manage the reconstruction. Construction began on the 13th day of that month. The queen delegated supervision of the reconstruction to Gojong's father, the Heungseon Daewongun, who went on to wield the monarchy's actual power for years afterwards. In this role, the Daewongun was able to consolidate his authority. Michael Kim evaluated the palace's construction as controversial amongst the elite, who criticized the expense of the project. The Daewongun tried to build enthusiasm for it. Records indicate that he went as far as to manufacture a positive omen: he had a piece of jade engraved with a message that warded off fire "discovered" at the construction site.

Historian Lee Gyu-cheol evaluated the construction effort as one of the largest and most expensive of the late Joseon period. Funding was procured through "voluntary payment" (원납전; 願納錢; wŏnnapchŏn) from mostly yangban (upper class) people from around Korea; such payments were actually mostly explicitly or implicitly coerced or rewarded with government benefits or later compensation. Resources also needed to be procured, ideally cost-effectively, for the reconstruction. Various structures that were deemed non-essential in and around Hanyang were demolished and their materials recycled for the palace. For example, on the 9th day, 5th month of 1865, a stone bridge called Songgyegyo (송계교; 松溪橋) was demolished for this reason. In the 8th month of 1865, it was ordered that all buildings except for five in Gyeonghuigung be demolished so that their materials could be used to reconstruct Gyeongbokgung. Gyeonghuigung ceased to be significantly used thereafter.

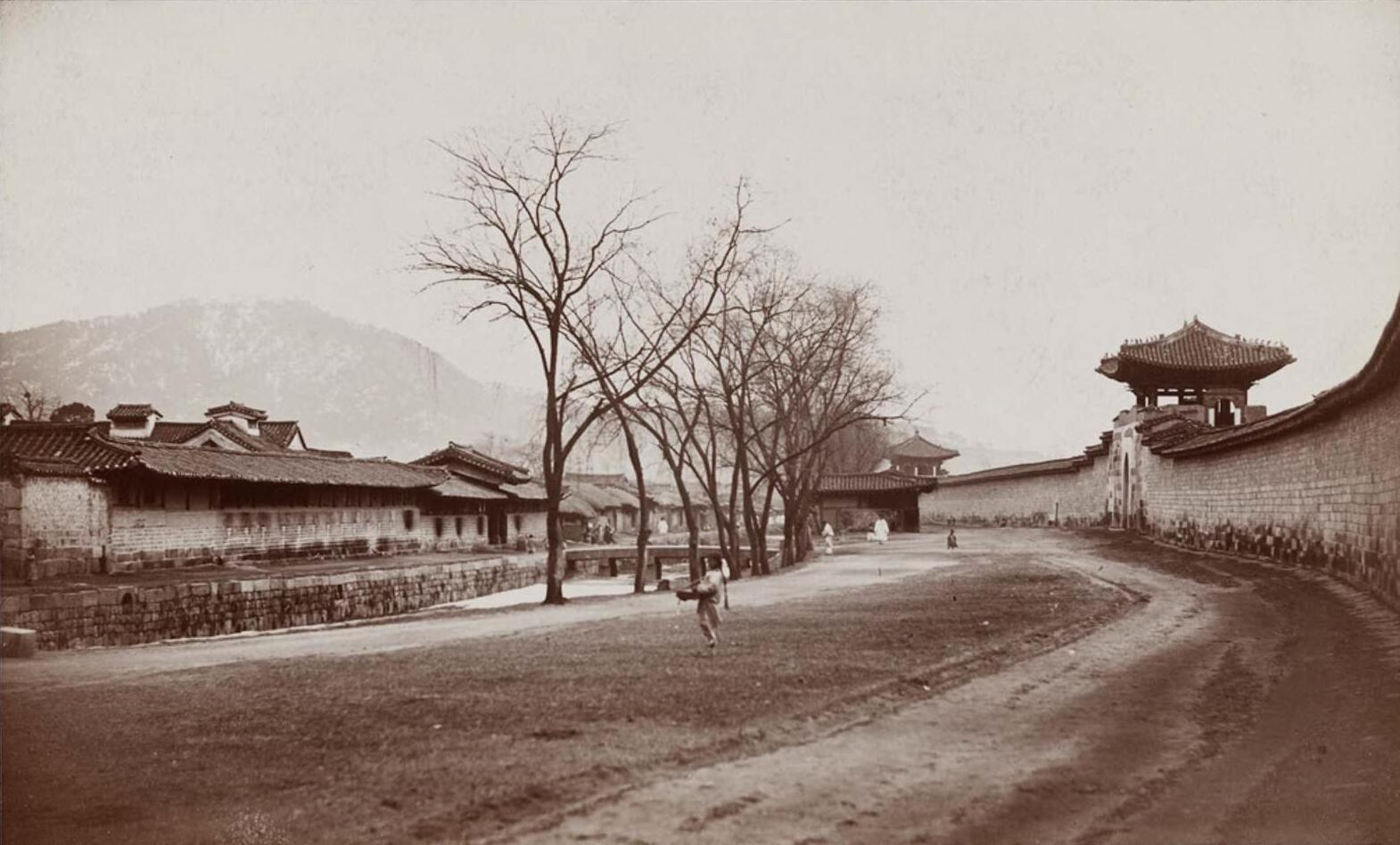
Exterior of Gyeongbukgung's east walls in 1884, after the houses were cleared

During the time of the palace's neglect, commoners had built houses and buildings right next to the palace walls. On the 12th day, 4th month of 1865, the first order to demolish such houses was issued. More demolitions were ordered in the following year. The monarchy demolished 4,502 private homes (1,872 with tile roofs and 2,553 with thatched roofs) around the palace during the reconstruction and paid compensation to those affected. The compensation was scaled according to estimated material value of the houses. Some estates were perceived to be so valuable that they were paid out many times the default payment, with one receiving a payment 450 times the default.

A total of 616,114 people either volunteered (원부군; 願赴軍; wŏnbugun) or were implicitly coerced by their superiors to construct the palace, with most working in the first few months of construction. On the 25th day, 4th month of 1865, there were reportedly 36,479 volunteers present at the construction site, with most being residents of Seoul. There are accounts of high spirits and regional pride at the construction sites; workers showed off their hometowns and affiliations with flags and uniforms, and the government provided amenities such as traditional music and entertainment while they worked. Accommodations, food, and travel reimbursement were provided, especially to those who came from far away.

Ten fires broke out during the reconstruction. Major ones occurred in the 3rd month of 1866 and 2nd month of 1867. The fires damaged small parts of the palace, but mostly destroyed much of the wood and woodworking facilities needed for the construction and caused delays. In 1866, the French expedition to Korea occurred, in which French ships attacked Joseon in retaliation for the execution of French missionaries. This was the first military conflict with a foreign country on Korean soil in over 200 years. It caused disruptions to labor and the shipping of materials for the palace. Geunjeongjeon and Sajeongjeon, which were constructed during this time, took around twice as long to build time compared to other similar buildings.

Gojong and the royal family moved into the palace on the 2nd day, 7th month of 1868. Construction continued until 1873. For example, at the time of his move-in, the palace's surrounding walls were temporary and made of mud; these were later replaced with permanent stone walls.

The palace experienced a major fire on the 10th day, 12th month of 1873 that destroyed 364 rooms. Ten days later, Gojong moved to Changdeokgung. Reconstruction efforts were continually pushed back due to financial and resource restrictions. It was not until the 27th day, 3rd month of 1875 that reconstruction began. He returned to Gyeongbokgung on the 27th day, 5th month of that year, and repairs concluded on the 3rd day, 6th month. However, on the 4th day, 11th month of 1876, another major fire broke out. It caused more than twice as much damage as its predecessor, destroying 830 rooms. Gojong was exasperated by the fires, and began planning to relocate to Changdeokgung. Five days later, he ordered that Changdeokgung and Changgyeonggung be repaired instead. He continued to stay in Gyeongbokgung for another four months during the repairs, then moved to Changdeokgung. Reconstruction on Gyeongbokgung began in 1881. Gojong did not return to Gyeongbokgung until 1884, after the Kapsin Coup. In 1887, the first electric light in Korea was turned on in Gyeongbokgung. Reconstruction was finally completed in 1888. Im wrote that the reconstruction had 7,225 rooms in buildings and 1,767 in the walls. More fires broke out, with one in an annex to Taewonjeon on the 19th day, 11th month of 1891 and another at Cheonchujeon on the 13th day, 10th month of 1892. Im argues that the expense of the post-fire reconstructions was a major factor in how the Daewongun lost political power.

Meanwhile, the palace and Korea experienced significant political turmoil. In 1894, amidst a truce during the 1894–1895 Donghak Peasant Revolution, Japanese troops stormed and occupied the palace and installed a pro-Japanese government. This set off the First Sino-Japanese War. In 1895, the Korean Queen Min was assassinated by Japanese agents at Geoncheonggung in the palace. The assassins also looted the palace during the attack. Afterwards, Gojong fled to the Russian legation for protection in 1896.

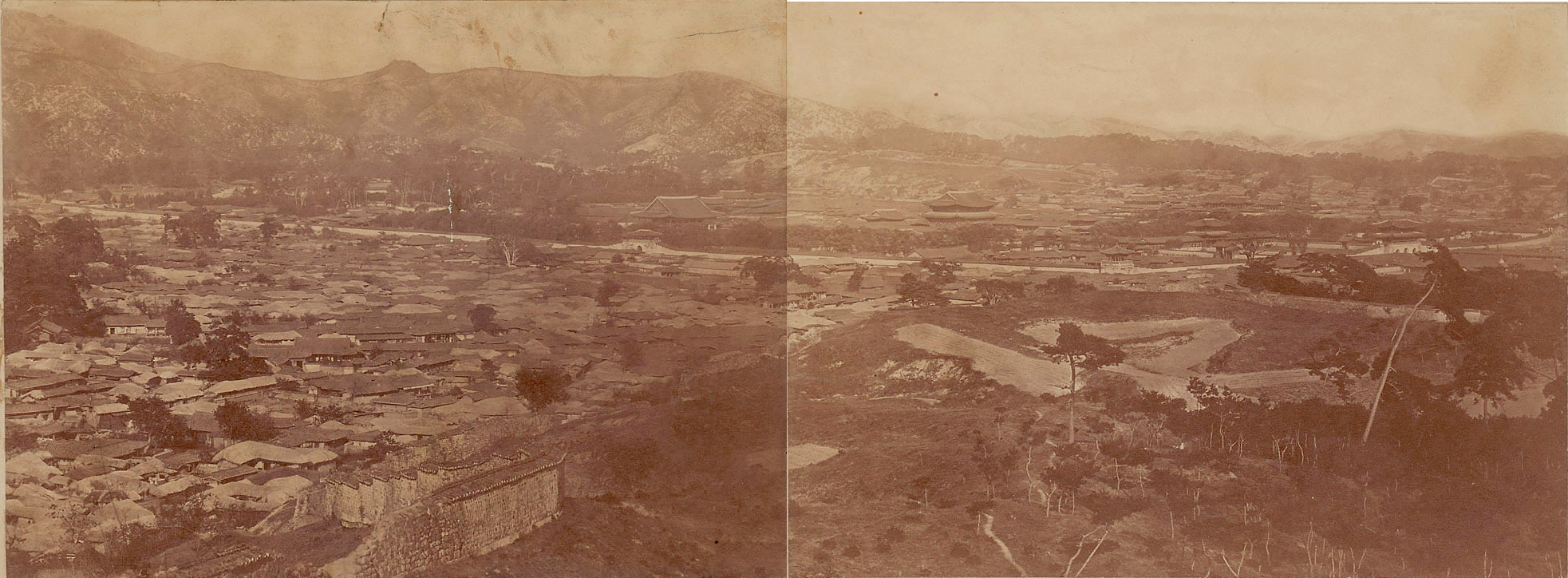
The palace in 1886

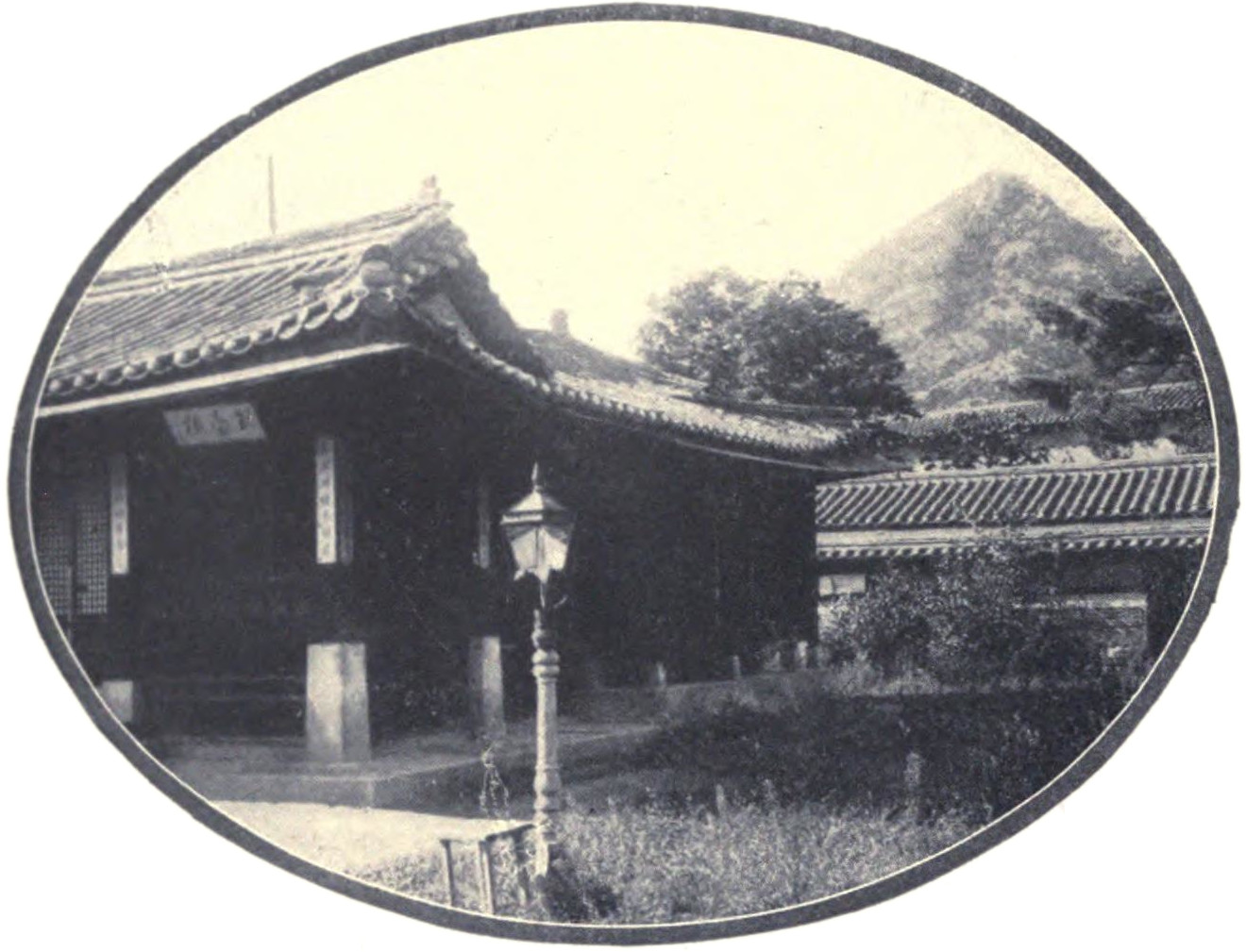
An electric light in Geoncheonggung (1901)

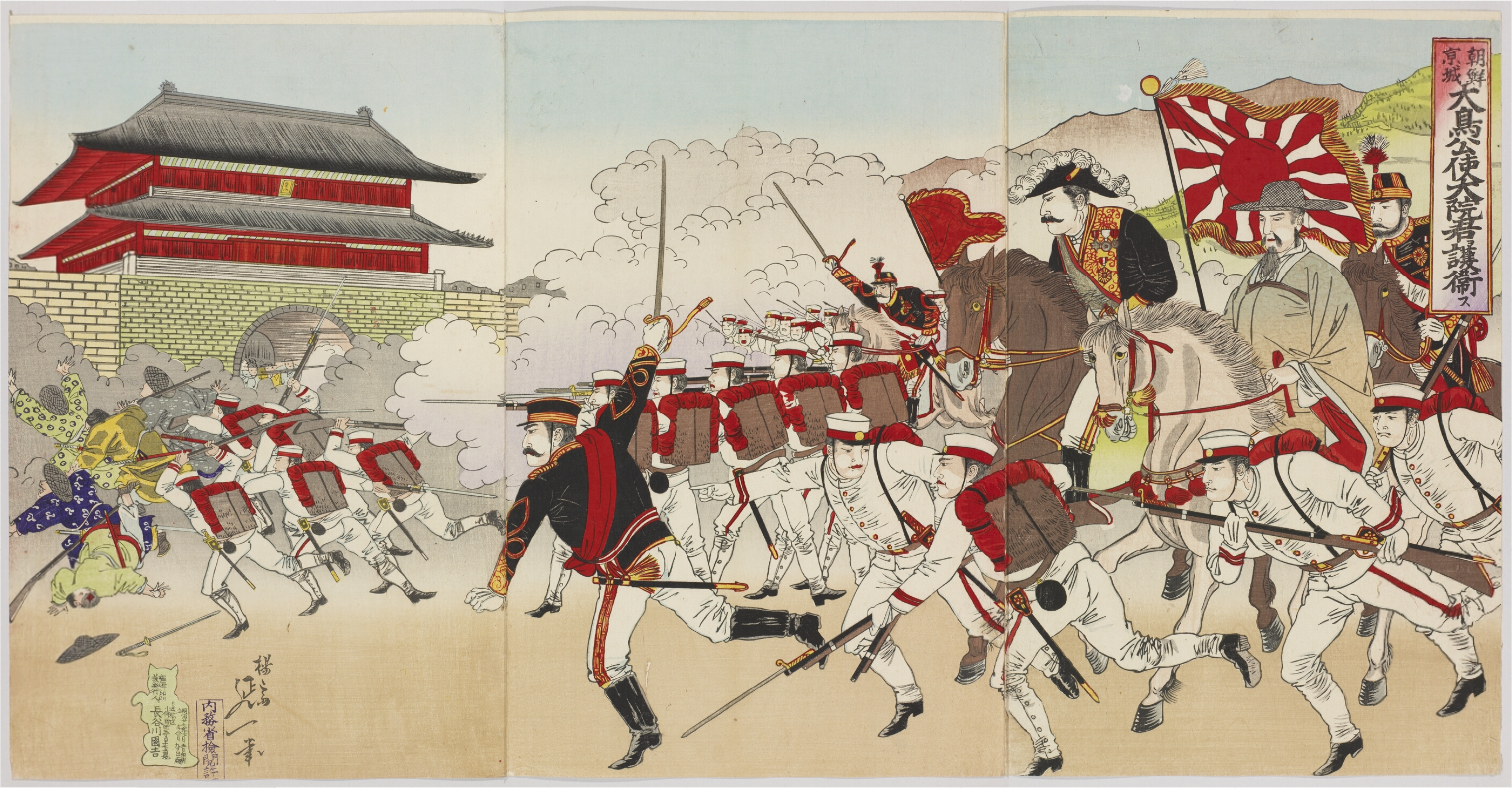
Print of Japanese troops storming Gyeongbokgung (1894)

== Korean Empire period ==
Rather than return to Gyeongbokgung, where Min had been assassinated, Gojong chose to make Gyeongungung (later called "Deoksugung") his primary residence for its proximity to various foreign legations, which he believed could help protect him from Japan. He then declared the establishment of the Korean Empire. Thereafter, Gyeongbokgung was not significantly used by Gojong, although the royal family continued using it for several ceremonies. Several of its structures were demolished and reused for buildings in Gyeongungung. Gyeongbokgung fell into disrepair. A fire broke out in the palace on September 21, 1899, destroying facilities for court ladies and servants. Gojong ordered maintenance on the palace in 1900, 1904, and 1907. However, after 1905, Japan began indirectly ruling Korea, and repairs were subject to approval by the Japanese Resident-General of Korea. Furthermore, Gojong was forced to abdicate in lieu of his son, Sunjong. Sunjong began to use Changdeokgung as his main palace.

In 1907, even before annexing Korea, Japan made Gyeongbokgung into a public park. The palace was opened to the public on March 3, 1908. It was open to the public for an admission fee of 10 jeon every Sunday and Wednesday from 7 a.m. to 5 p.m. According to one estimate, that year, the palace had around 9,240 rooms total: more than Changdeokgung and Changgyeonggung combined. Architects Park Sung-Jin and Woo Don-Son, based on the 1907 diagram entitled Pukkwŏldohyŏng, estimated that the palace had 509 buildings with 6,806 rooms: down 113 buildings and 1,301 rooms from its previous state. On June 25, 1908, all royal facilities were put under control of the government office Kungnaebu, which was operated by pro-Japanese Koreans. That office began auctioning off the palace's property to the public in 1910, just before the annexation. A Taehan maeil sinbo article from May 1, 1910, claimed that 4,000 rooms of Gyeongbokgung's buildings were up for auction; Shin estimated this was around two thirds of all the rooms in the palace. The auction was held on May 10 of that year. Around ten people bought the buildings up for auction; one Japanese person bought a third of the rooms for sale for a price of around 15 won to 25 won per room.

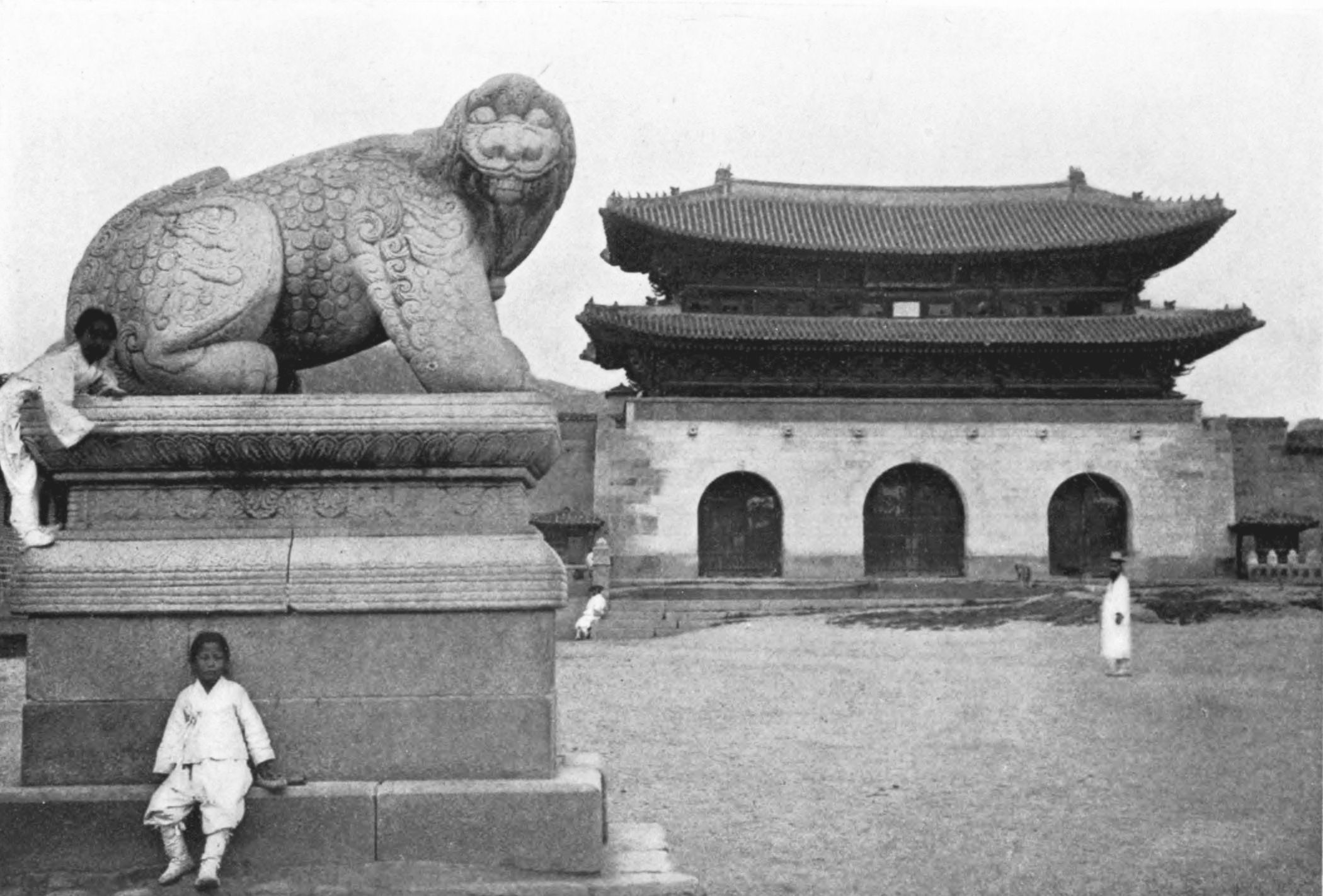
Children playing with one of the xiezhi (haetae) statues in front of Gwanghwamun (published 1906)

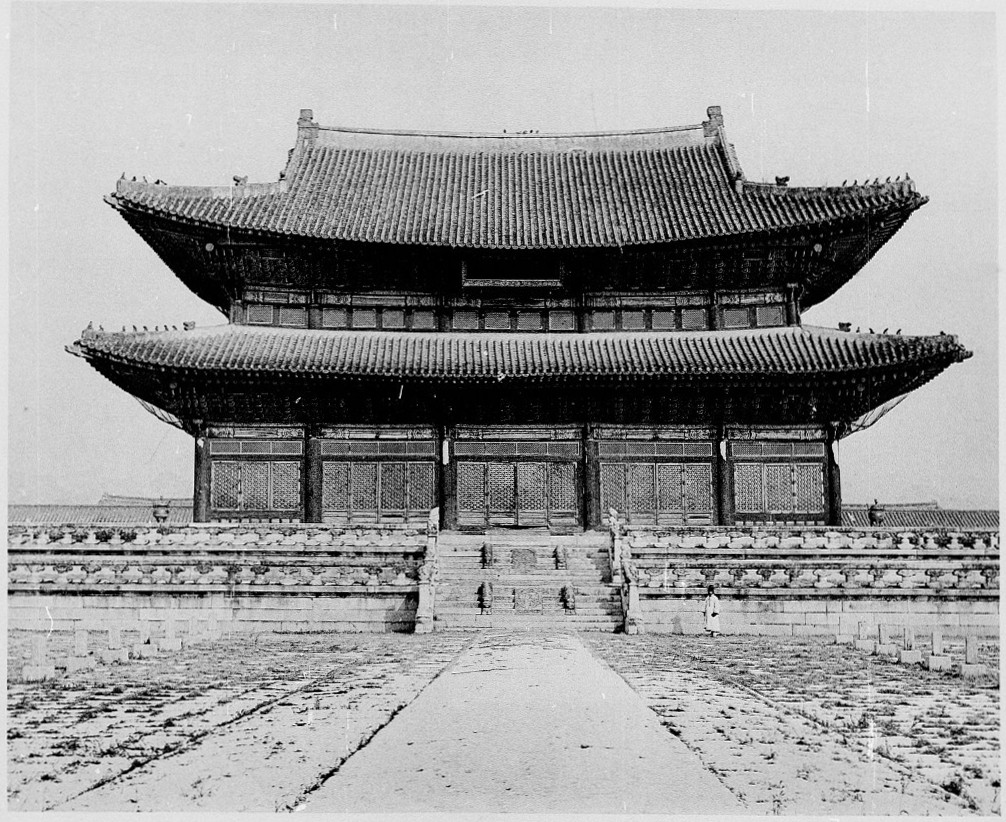
Geunjeongjeon (published 1900)

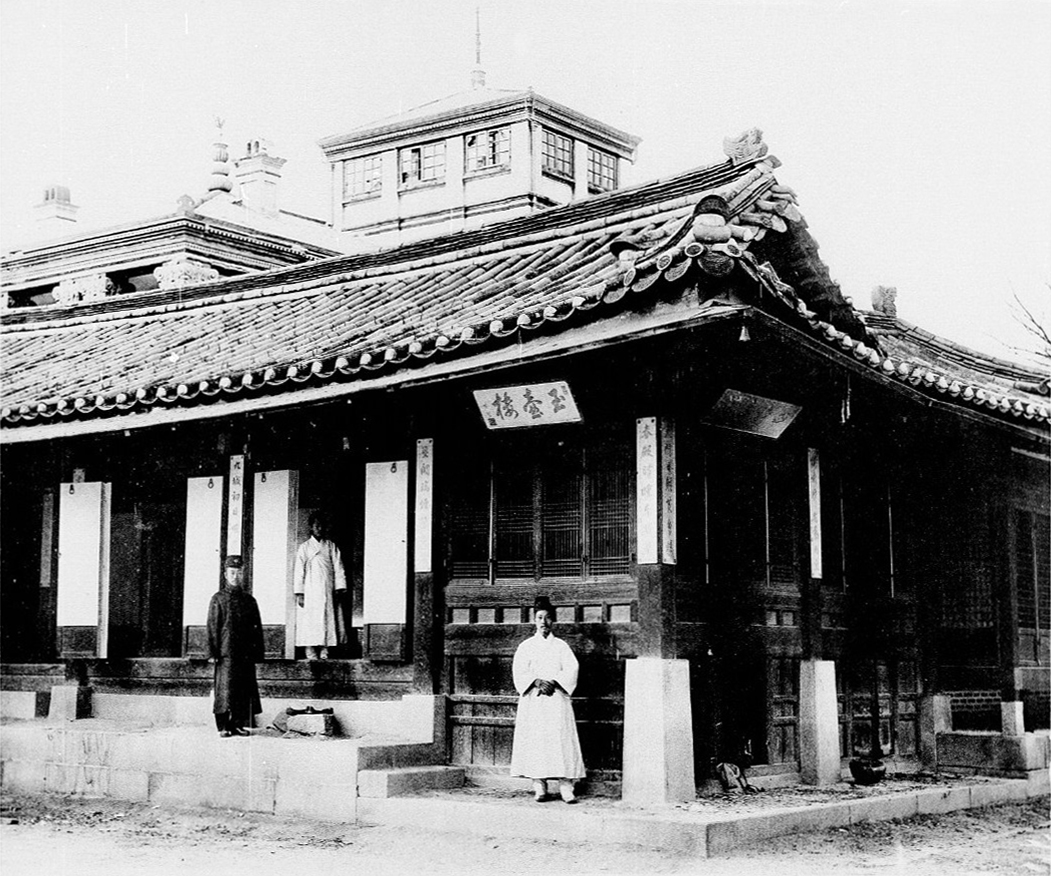
Geoncheonggung (published 1900)

== Colonial period ==
Gyeongbokgung, as a symbol of the Korean monarchy's authority, was systematically dismantled by the Japanese colonial government. On May 17, 1911, it was donated by the Kungnaebu to the colonial government. The first major project undertaken by the colonial government was to demolish the East Palace; they argued that section was unnecessary. Historian Shin Hye-won evaluated this as a symbolic dismissal of the continuity of the Korean monarchy, as that area was traditionally where the crown prince would prepare to be the next king. The price of public admission to the palace was halved to a value trivial to most people. In the fall of 1913, the colonial government held a birthday celebration for the recently deceased Emperor Meiji at the palace.

The palace was rapidly modified in anticipation of the September 11 to October 31, 1915 Chōsen Industrial Exhibition, which was mainly held in the southern part of the palace. Buildings were auctioned off in September 1914; this resulted in the demolition of 15 buildings and 9 gates by March 1915. One such building, Jaseondang, was reassembled in the private home of Japanese businessman Ōkura Kihachirō in Tokyo. Four other buildings sold were moved to the Namsan area, where many wealthy Japanese people lived. The exhibition, as was common with other colonial exhibitions of the age, was partly intended to highlight the modernity of the colonizer in order to justify the colonization. Shin evaluated the symbolic setting of the exhibition in Gyeongbokgung as amplifying the effect. Over 1 million people attended the exhibition, including nearly 300,000 people from Japan. More exhibitions continued to be held at the palace afterwards, including the 1923 Chōsen Agricultural Exhibition (조선부업품공진회; 朝鮮副業品共進會), 1925 Chōsen Poultry Exhibition (조선가금공진회; 朝鮮家禽共進會), 1926 Chōsen Exhibition (조선박람회; 朝鮮博覽會), 1929 Chōsen Exhibition (조선박람회; 朝鮮博覽會), and 1935 Chōsen Industrial Exhibition (조선산업박람회; 朝鮮産業博覽會).

The residency-general had established a temporary museum in the East Palace in 1909. After the 1915 exhibition, they converted the museum into the permanent Government-General Museum of Chōsen. That museum's building was completed in September 1915, and the museum opened to the public on December 1 of that year. The museum and Japanese Korean studies research in general have been described as intentionally focused on Korea's ancient history, in order to portray Korea as old and Japan as modern. Only 4.5% of the museum's collection was from the Joseon period; 76% was from before that.

The 1915 Chōsen Industrial Exhibition

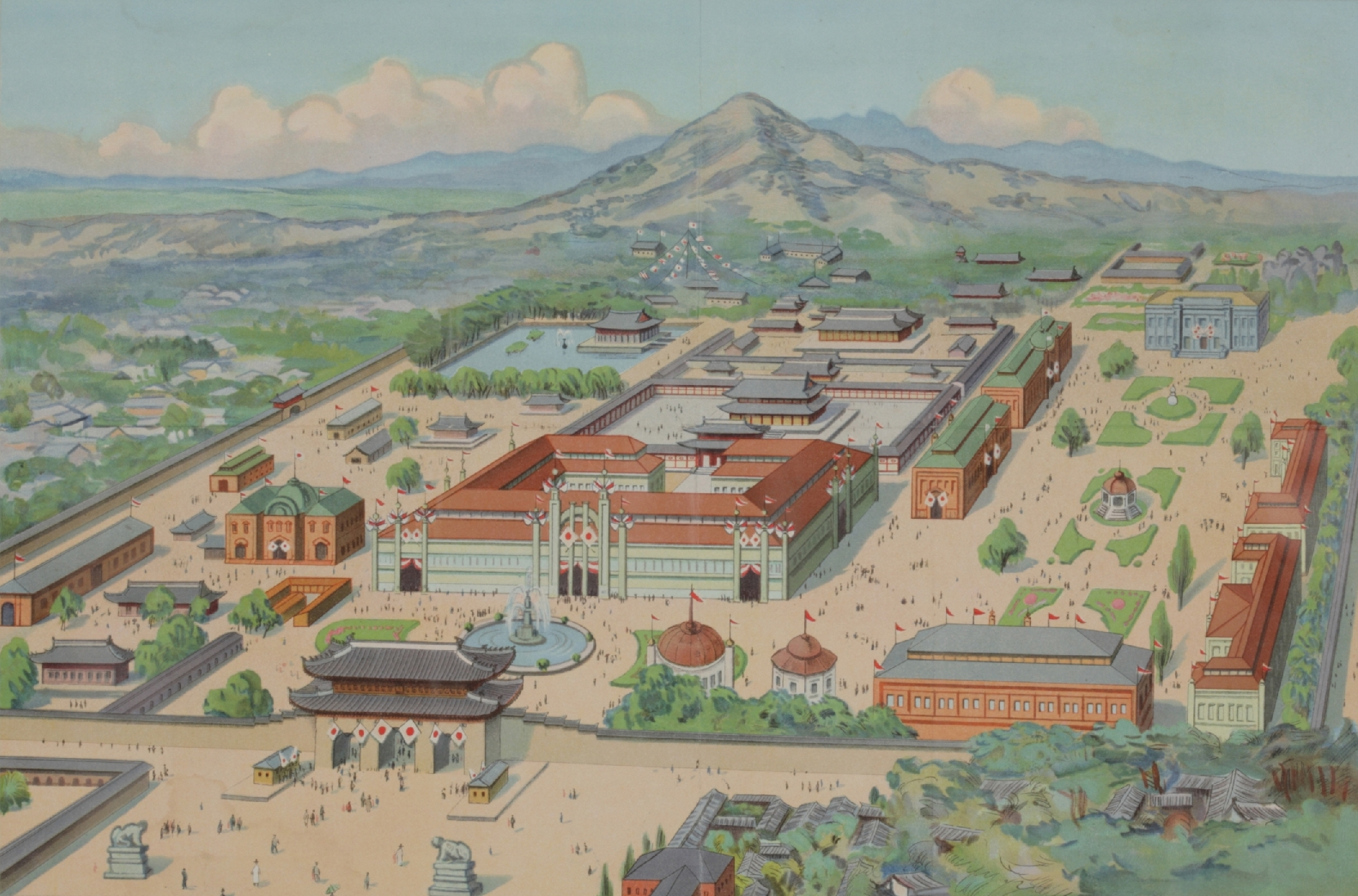
Drawing of the palace from an advertisement

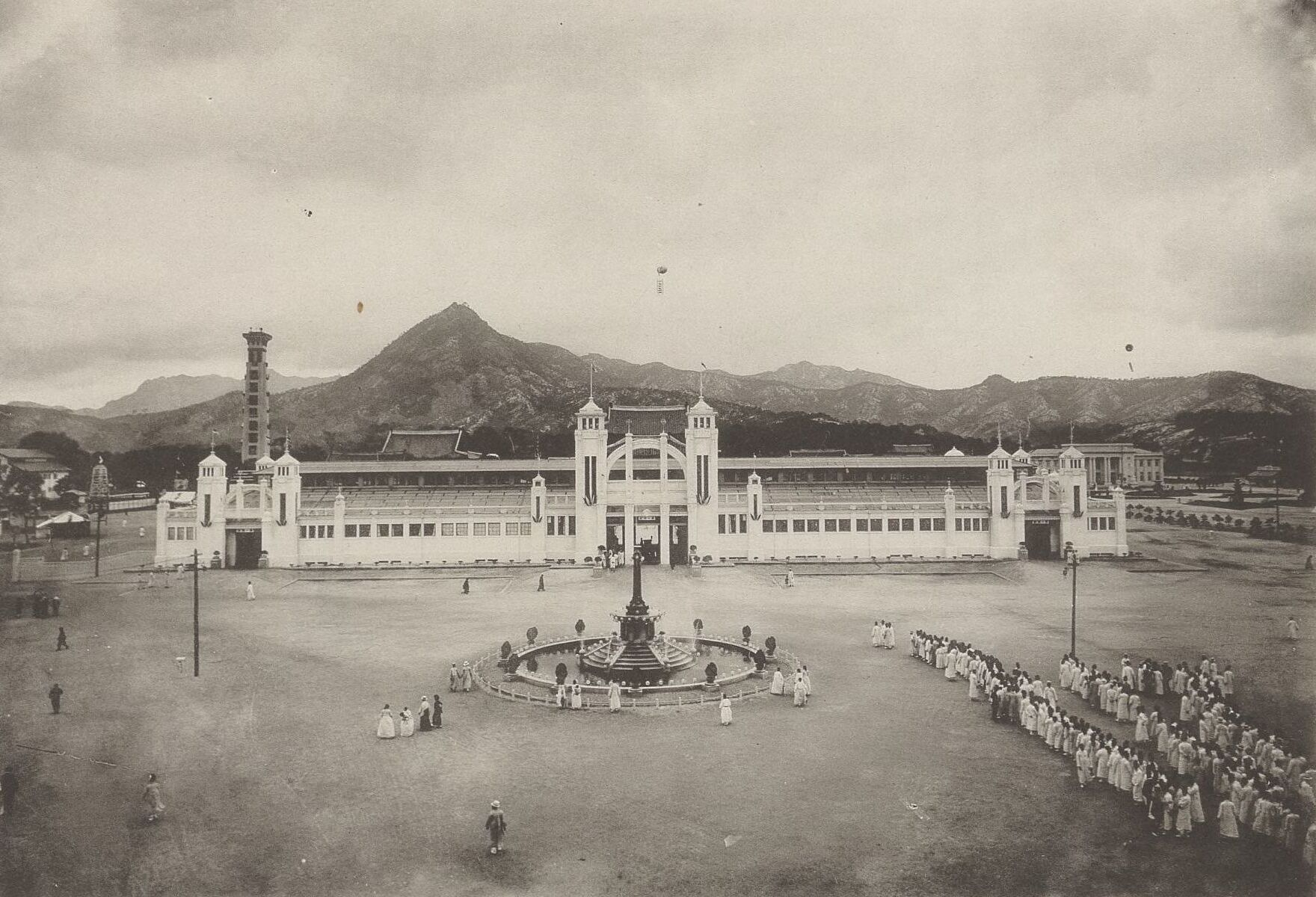
Main exhibition hall

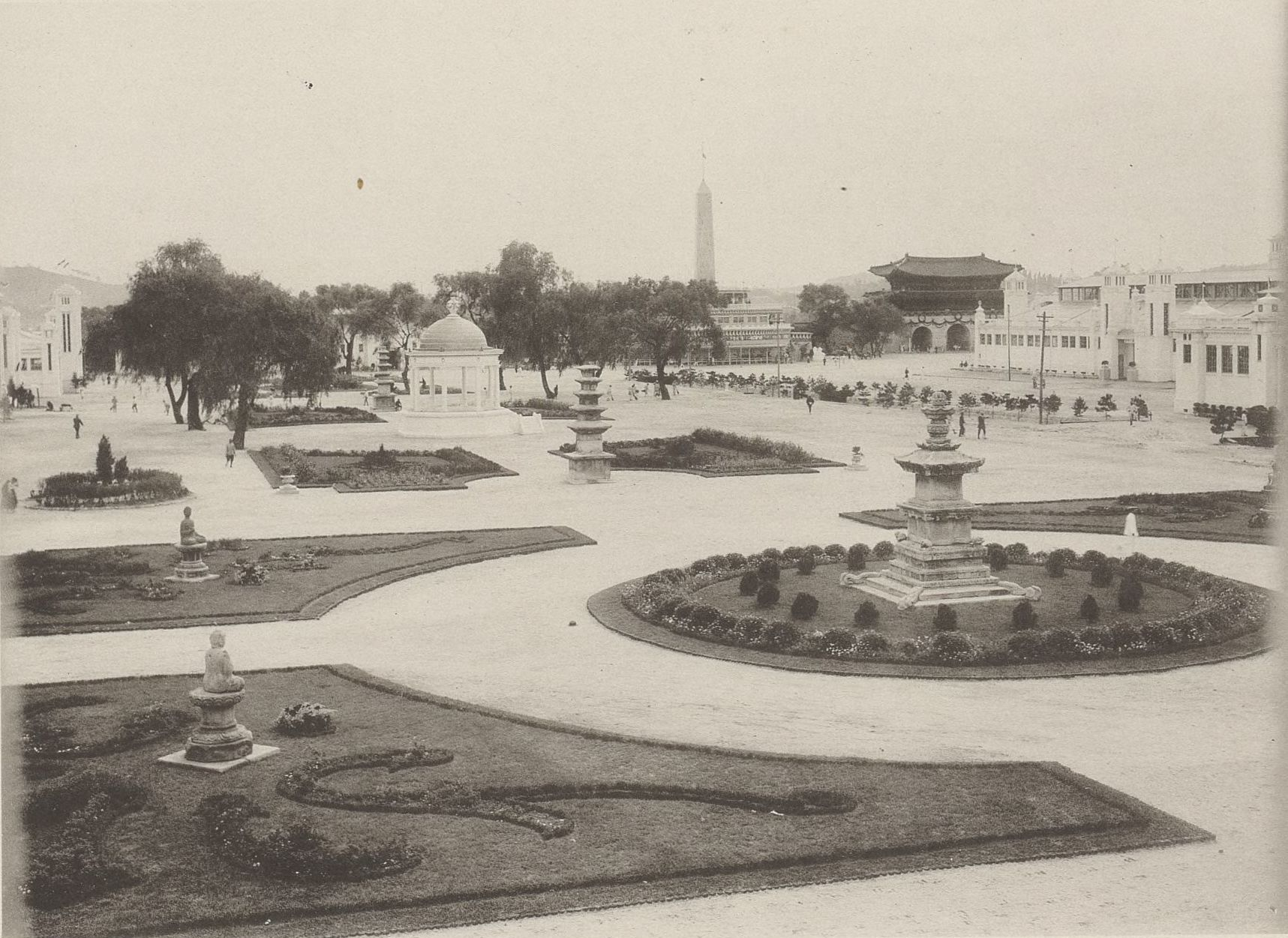
View of the east palace gardens

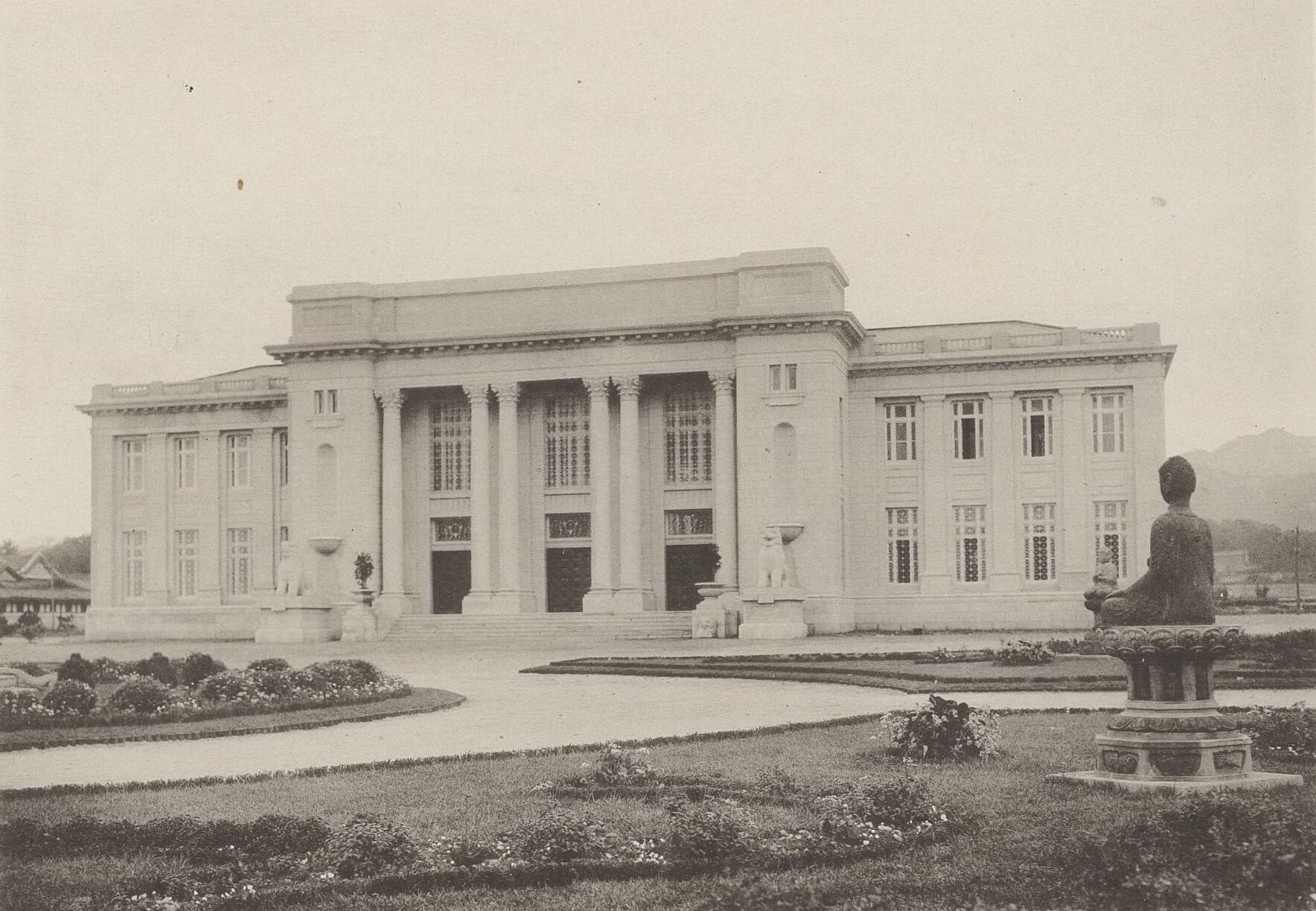
Government-General Museum of Chōsen

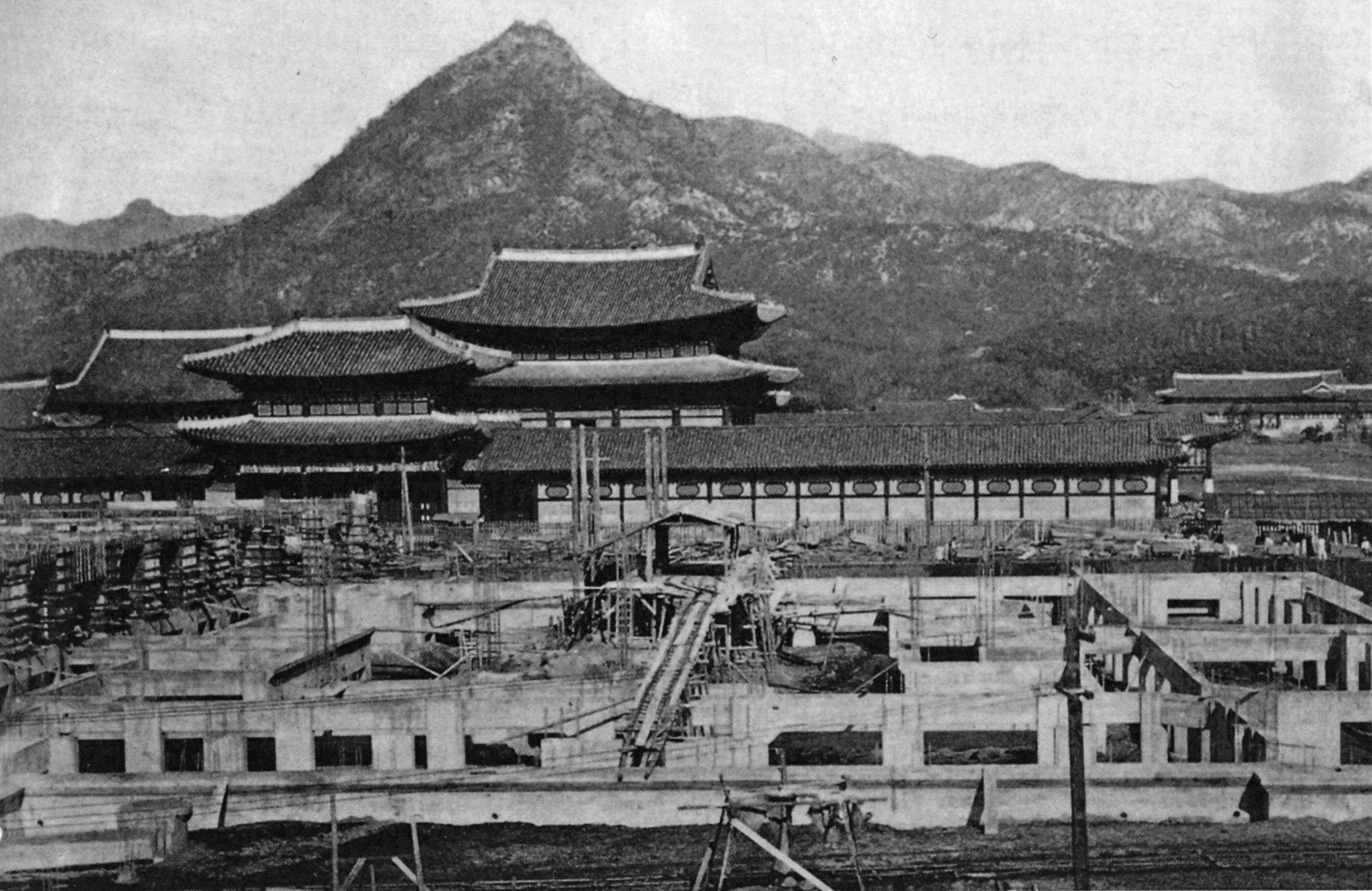
The Government-General of Chōsen Building under construction (1920)

On June 25, 1916, the colonial government began symbolically constructing their new headquarters in the palace: the Government-General of Chōsen Building. Construction would last for around 10 years, until October 1, 1926. After the building's completion, construction began on the grounds around it. A baseball field was constructed to the building's east and a tennis court and 400-meter track to its north. The tennis court would persist until the Fifth Republic of Korea (1981–1988). The various construction projects in the palace drew from an eclectic mix of modern Western architectural styles. This has been evaluated as attempting to portray Japan as modernizing and open, and Korea as backward and closed.

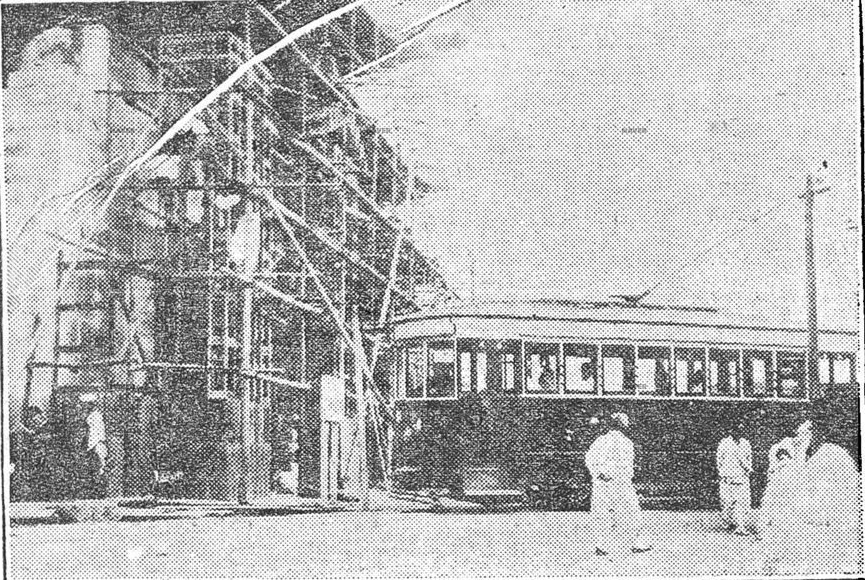
Gwanghwamun under construction to accommodate the Seoul Tram (October 3, 1923)

On November 10, 1917, a major fire at Changdeokgung destroyed much of that palace. The colonial government ordered that many of Gyeongbokgung's buildings be moved to Changdeokgung. A plan to demolish the palace's main gate Gwanghwamun became public knowledge in 1921. It was met with opposition from both Koreans and from Japanese Koreanist Yanagi Sōetsu. Yanagi has since been credited with playing a significant role in saving the gate; it was ultimately in 1927 relocated to the north of Geonchunmun, in violation of the auspicious north–south axis that it had previously been placed on. The wall tower Seosipjagak was demolished to make way for a tram, which opened on October 2, 1923.

After the 1919 March First Movement protests against Japanese rule, the government-general began allowing some more expression of Korean culture under a series of policies dubbed "cultural rule". As a result of this, and through the initiative of Yanagi, the Chōsen Folk Art Museum was established in the palace in 1924. Shin argued that, while Yanagi was sympathetic to Korea in a number of regards, he and his museum ultimately portrayed Koreans as weak and inferior in an imperialist fashion. Beginning in 1926, annual Shinto ceremonies honoring Japanese police officers that died while suppressing the Korean independence movement began to be held in Geunjeongjeon. The Seoul Historiography Institute evaluated this as an intentionally symbolic act: turning the former seat of Joseon's power into the "Yasukuni Shrine of Chōsen". For the 1929 Chōsen Exhibition in the palace, a number of exhibits were themed "Korean style", which Henry evaluated as superficial.

In 1929, a road construction project resulted in the walls being altered. In 1938, the final pre-colonial building west and south of Geunjeongjeon, an office building for the Sŏnjŏn'gwan, was demolished.

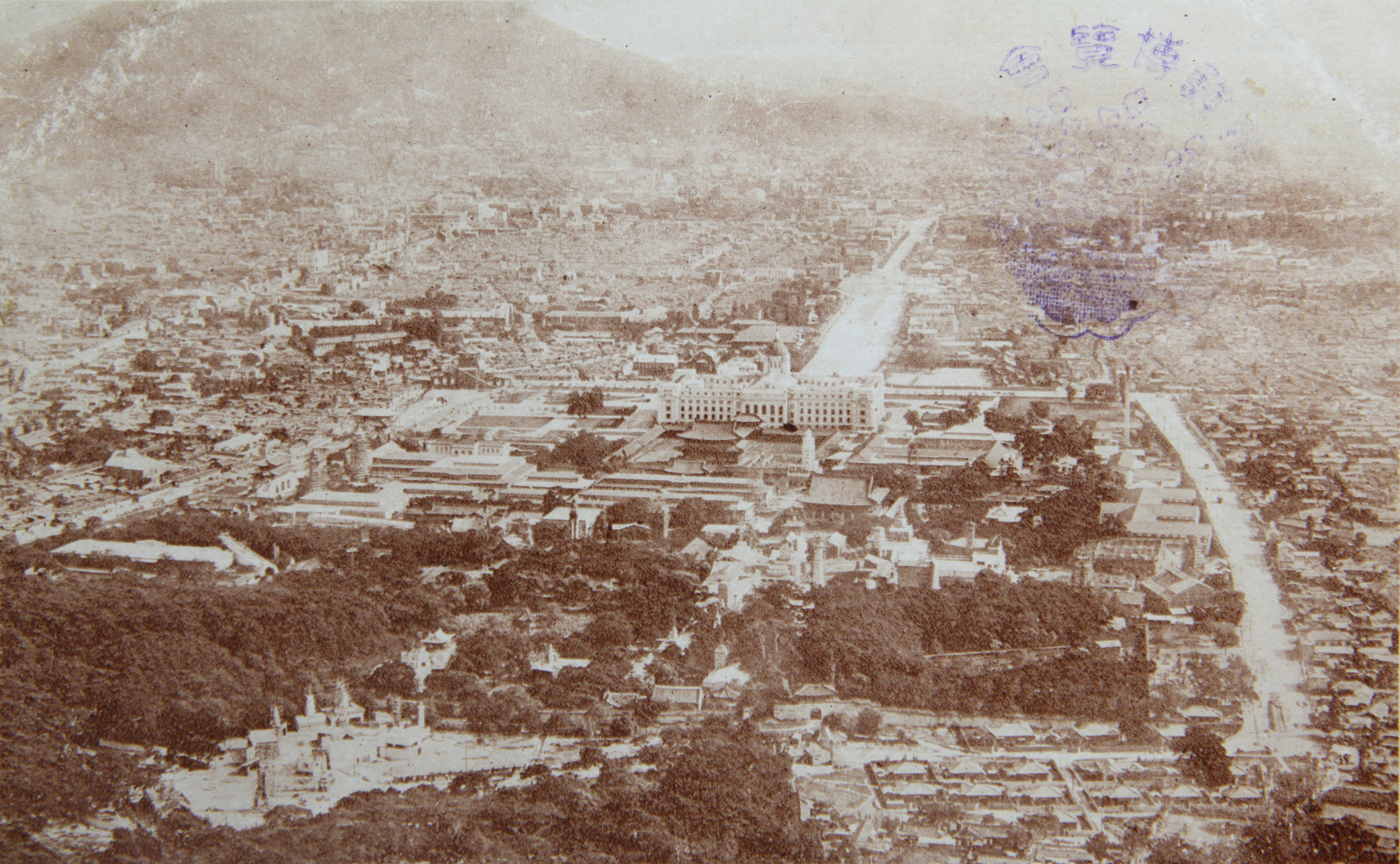
View of the palace from Bugaksan in the north, during the 1929 Chōsen Exhibition

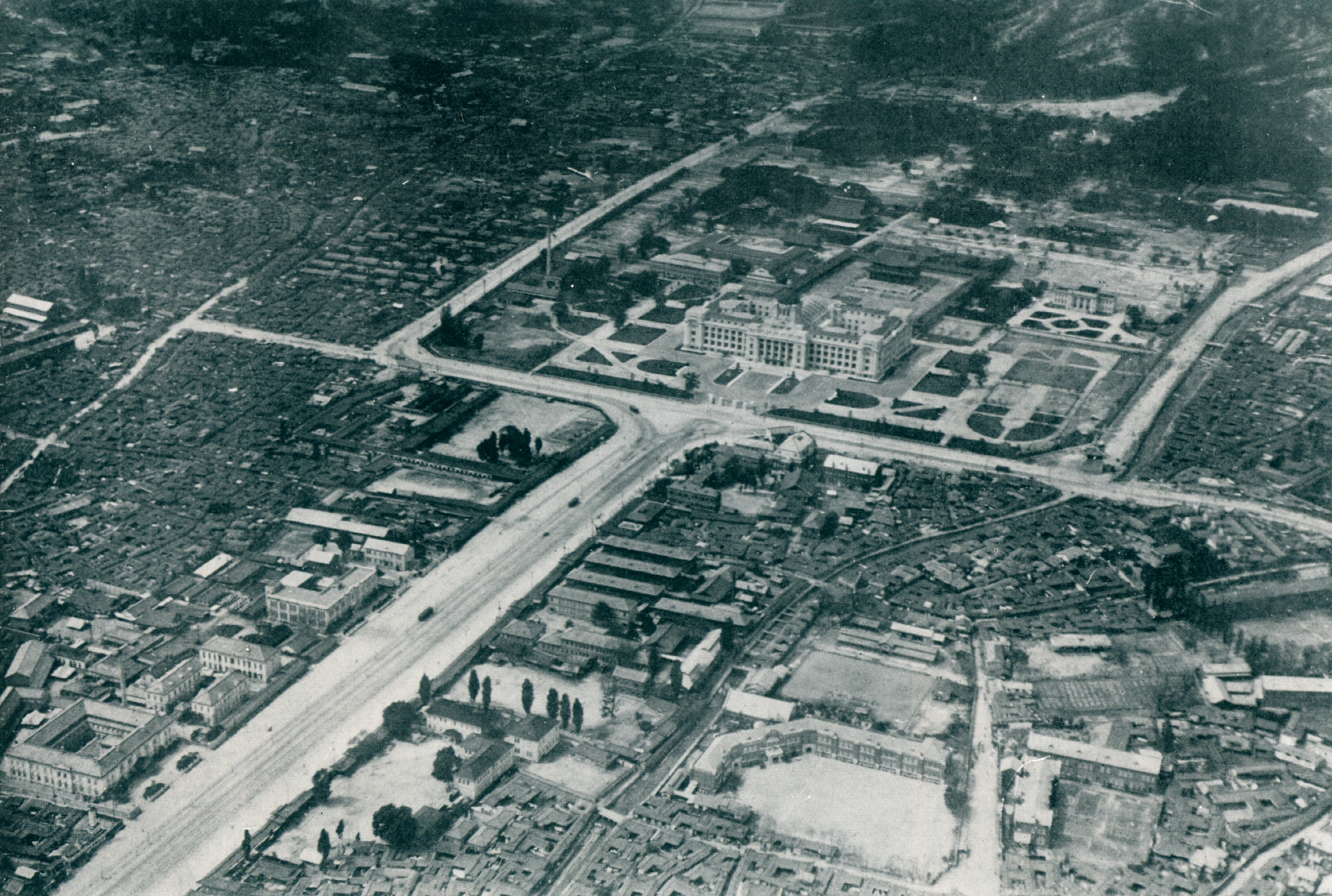
Aerial view of the palace (1930)

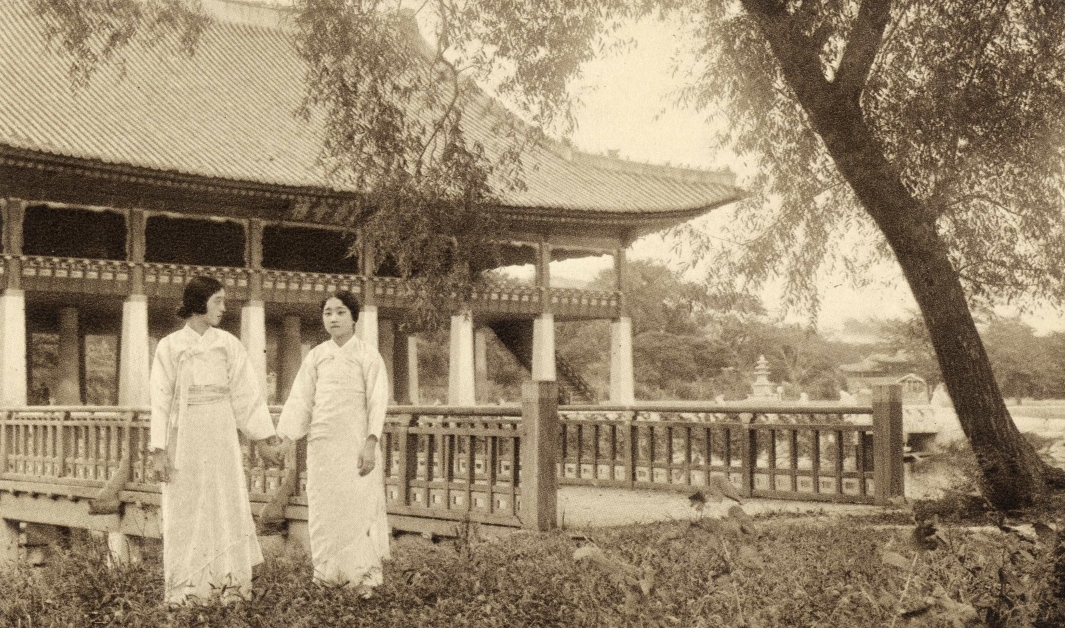
Two kisaeng (female entertainers) at Gyeonghoeru

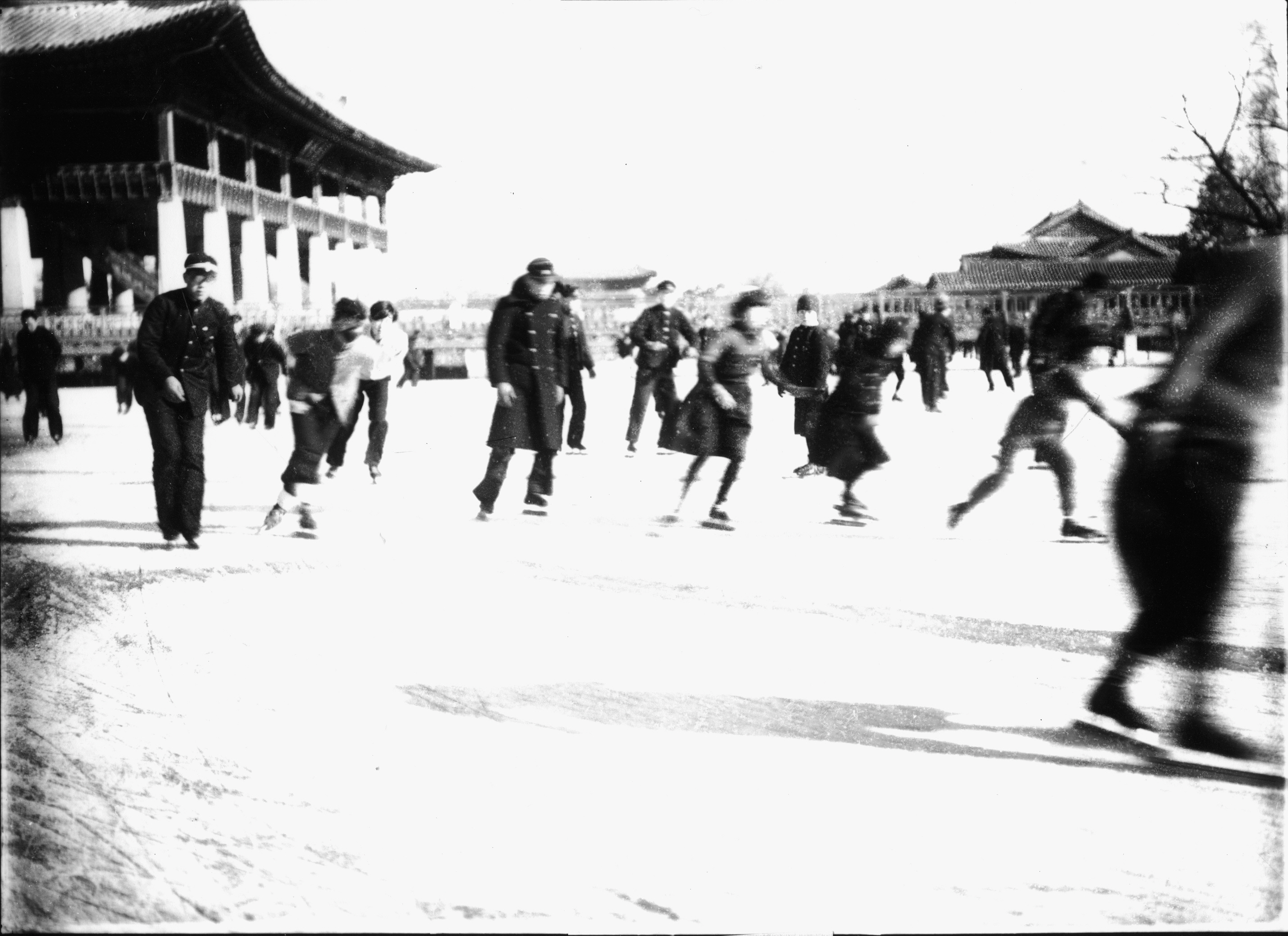
Ice skating at Gyeonghoeru

== Liberation to First Republic ==
Buildings in Gyeongbokgung upon the liberation
| Period | Building | Completion date | Notes |
|---|---|---|---|
| Colonial | Government-General of Chōsen Building | 1926 | Five floors, demolished in 1997 |
| Colonial | Government-General of Chōsen Building Annex 1 | 1938 | Four floors |
| Colonial | Government-General of Chōsen Building Annex 3 | 1938 | Four floors |
| Colonial | Government-General of Chōsen Art Museum | 1915 | Two floors, demolished in 1995 |
| Colonial | Government-General Museum of Chōsen and annex building | 1915 | Originally built as museum warehouse, two-story brick building, currently used as Gyeongbokgung office building |
| Colonial | Government-General of Chōsen Art Museum building (post-1935) | 1935 | One-story brick building, demolished in 1999 |
| Joseon | Gwanghwamun | 1865 | Had been moved north of Geonchunmun in 1927 |
| Joseon | Geonchunmun | 1865 | |
| Joseon | Sinmumun | 1865 | |
| Joseon | Dongsipjagak | 1865 | Watchtower that was separated from the palace in 1927 |
| Joseon | Geunjeongjeon | 1867 | |
| Joseon | Geunjeongmun | 1867 | |
| Joseon | Corridors for Geunjeongjeon | 1867 | Halls surrounding Geunjeongjeon, Yungmullu, and Yungmuru |
| Joseon | Sajeongjeon and annexes | 1867 | Partially used for museum storage. |
| Joseon | Sajeongmun | 1867 | |
| Joseon | Cheonchujeon | 1865 | Partially used for museum storage. |
| Joseon | Manchunjeon | 1866 | Partially used for museum storage. |
| Joseon | Sujeongjeon | 1867 | |
| Joseon | Gyeonghoeru | 1867 | |
| Joseon | Jagyeongjeon and annexes | 1865 | Destroyed in the 1873 and 1876 fires. Rebuilt in 1888. |
| Joseon | Jesuhap | 1867 | Annex (별당; 別堂; pyŏltang) to Jagyeongjeon |
| Joseon | Hamhwadang | 1873 | |
| Joseon | Jipgyeongdang | 1873 | |
| Joseon | Hyangwonjeong | 1873 | |
| Joseon | Jibokjae | 1891 | Moved to Gyeongbokgung from Changdeokgung |
| Joseon | Hyeopgildang | 1891 | Moved to Gyeongbokgung from Changdeokgung |
| Joseon | Parujeong | 1891 | |
| Joseon | Gyeongandang | 1865 | Demolished in 1966 to make way for the National General Museum of Korea (국립종합박물관) |
| Joseon | Hyangdan | 1865 | Demolished in 1966 to make way for the National General Museum of Korea |
| Joseon | Jeonghundang | 1865 | Demolished in 1966 to make way for the National General Museum of Korea |

Upon the liberation, there were 40 pre-colonial buildings in the palace with 857 rooms. Park and Woo estimated that around 356 buildings with 4,648 rooms had been demolished during the colonial period. A 2022 Seoul Historiography Institute book estimated that around 4,000 rooms had been demolished.

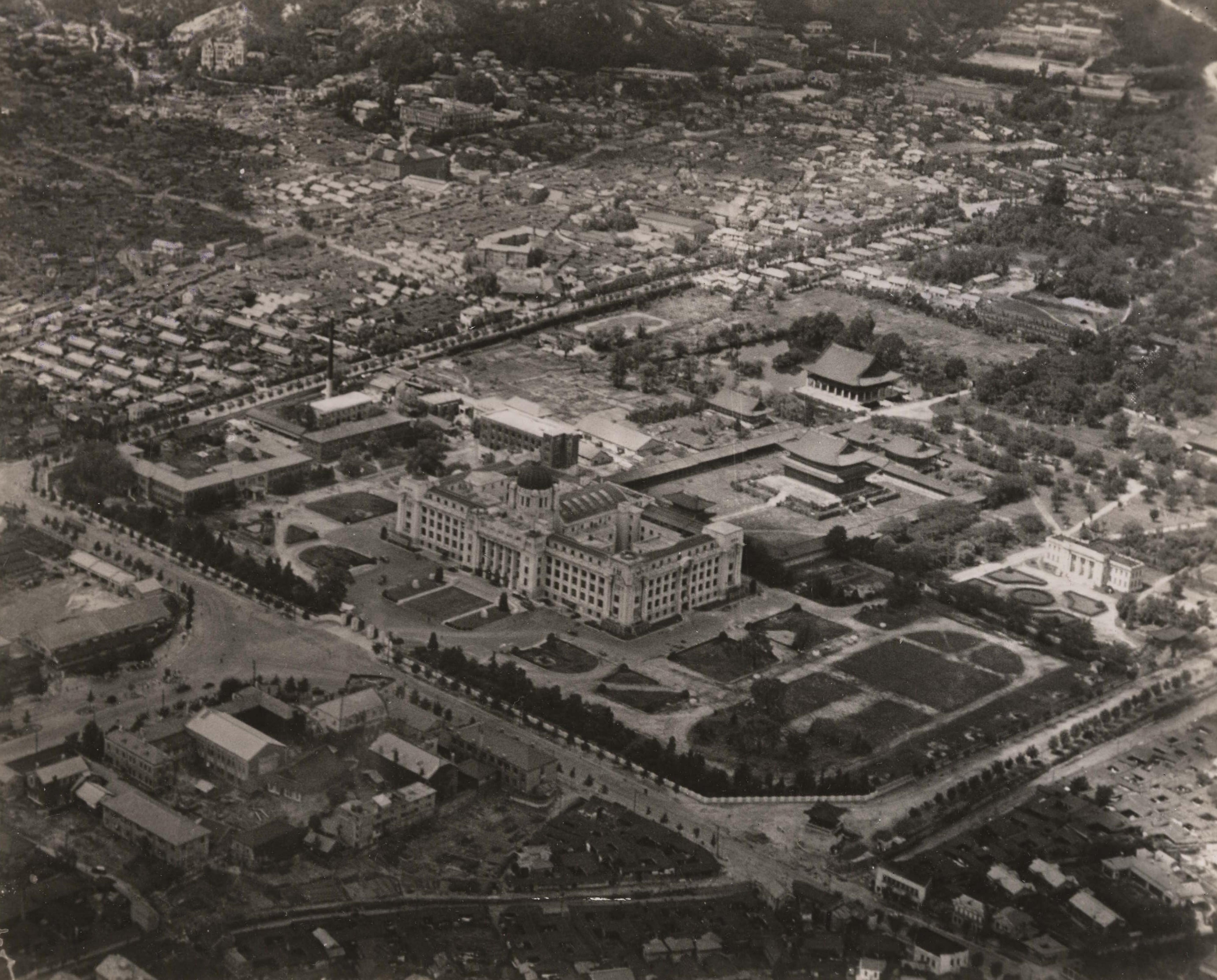
Aerial shot of the palace, weeks after the liberation (September 9, 1945)

Soon after the August 1945 liberation of Korea, the palace continued to be used much as it had been during the colonial period. Voices advocated for the restoration and maintenance of the palace, but these went largely unheeded amidst the chaos of the liberation and division of Korea, as well as the establishment of the United States Army Military Government in Korea (USAMGIK). In September 1945, the USAMGIK headquartered itself in the Government-General of Chōsen Building (which began to be called the "Central Government Building"; CGB; 중앙청; 中央廳) in the palace. That building continued to be used for important functions through the rest of the 1940s, including for the opening of the 1948 Constituent National Assembly and ceremony for the establishment of South Korea. Public events also continued to be held in the palace; for example, a trade exhibition was held there on April 26, 1946.

The palace's facilities fell into disrepair. Management of the palace was delegated to a new organization called the Office for the Former Royal Family. The first post-liberation maintenance work carried out on the palace was in April 1948. Around the establishment of South Korea later that year, the Ministry of Culture and Education and Gyeongbokgung Palace Management Office (경복궁 관리사무소) were established and management transferred to them. In 1950, a Joseon-style pavilion called Hahyangjeong was constructed to the northeast of Gyeonghoeru.

During the 1950–1953 Korean War, the palace was heavily damaged and even looted. Damage was so significant that the scale of it would not be properly understood even for years afterwards. It was only on December 19, 1952, that the Ministry of Culture and Education established a committee (Note: Entitled "Temporary Commission for the Preservation of National Treasures, Scenic Sites, Historic Sites, and Natural Monuments" (국보명승고적천연기념물임시보존위원)) to assess and repair the country's historic assets. Even then, maintenance of historical assets was considered a lesser priority compared to the country's basic social services like primary education. After some repairs to the palace, in part funded by the American-Korean Foundation (한미재단), it was reopened to the public in January 1953. Significant damage to the palace would persist for years afterwards; for example, the CGB remained in poor condition until its 1962–1964 repairs.

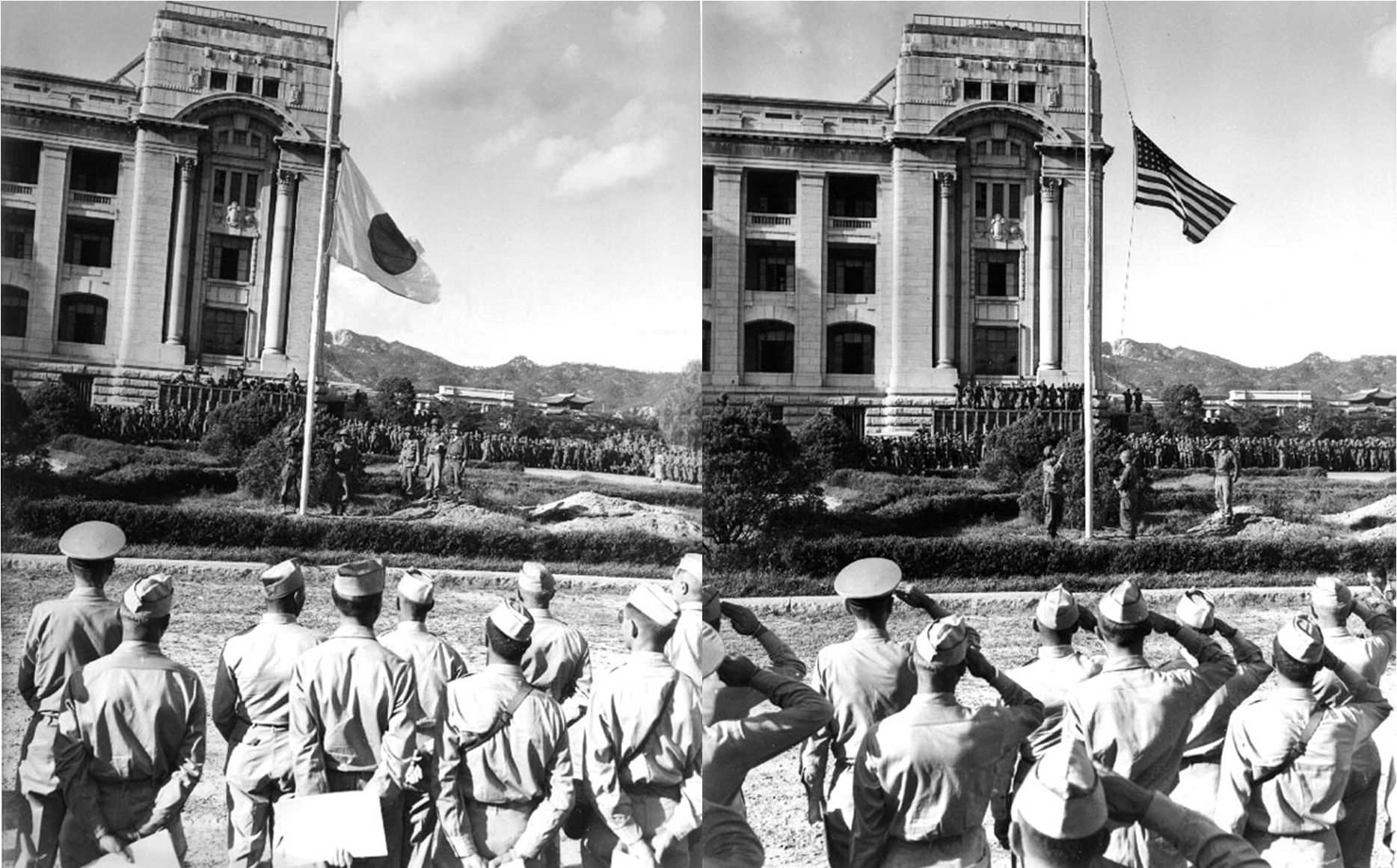
The surrender of Japan and establishment of the USAMGIK at the CGB (September 9, 1945)

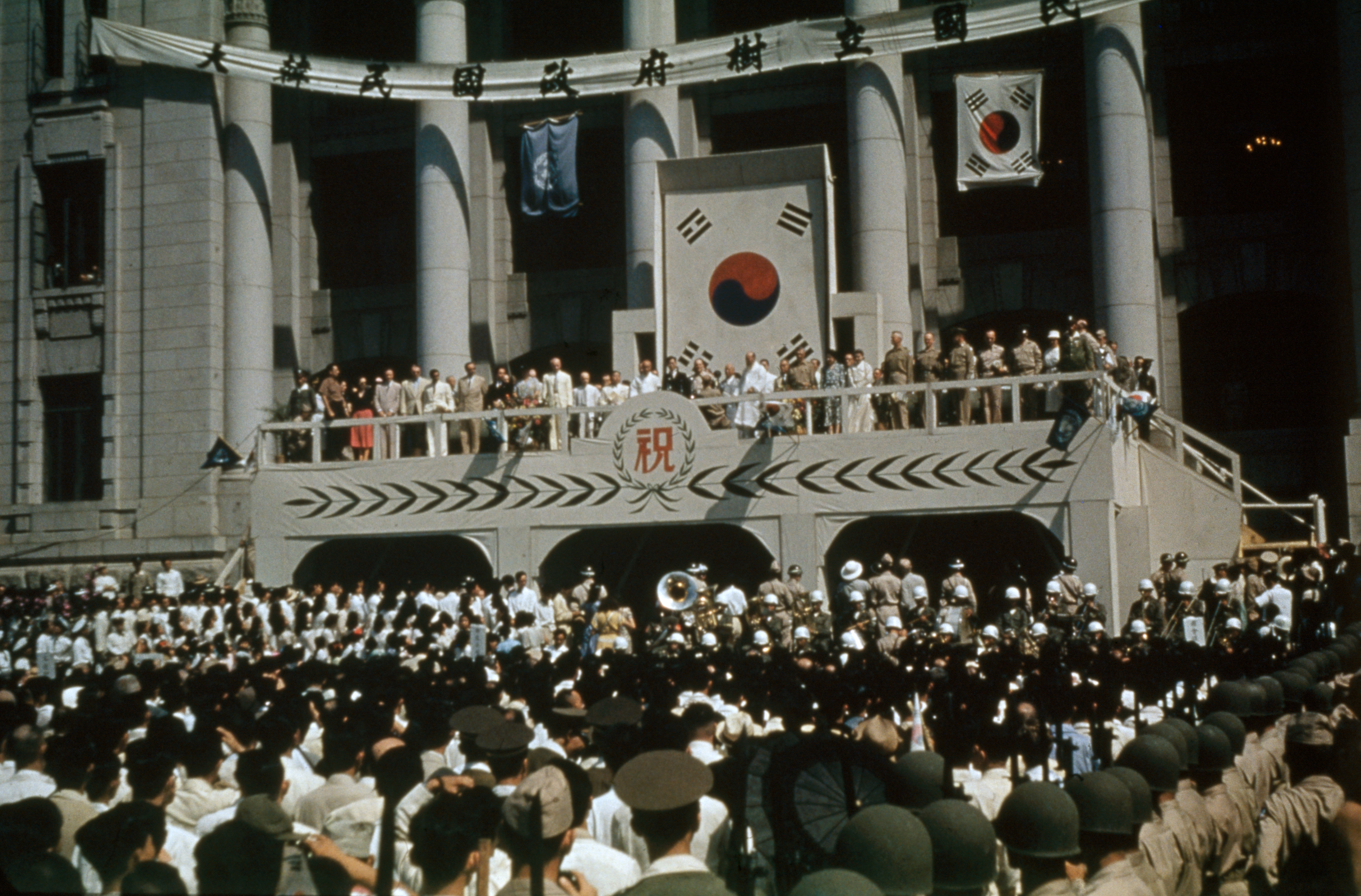
The establishment of South Korea at the CGB (August 15, 1948)

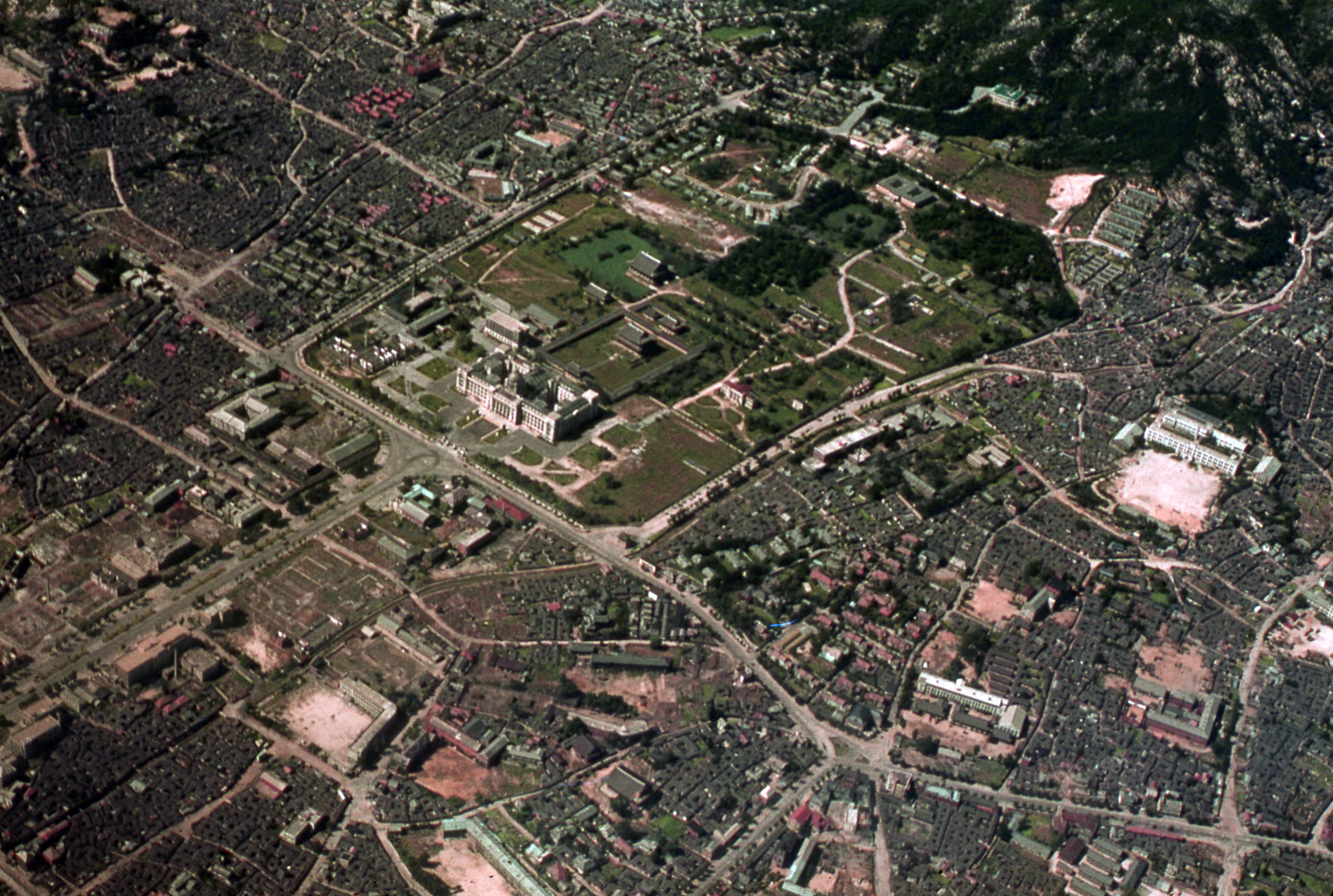
The palace, viewed from the sky (1951)

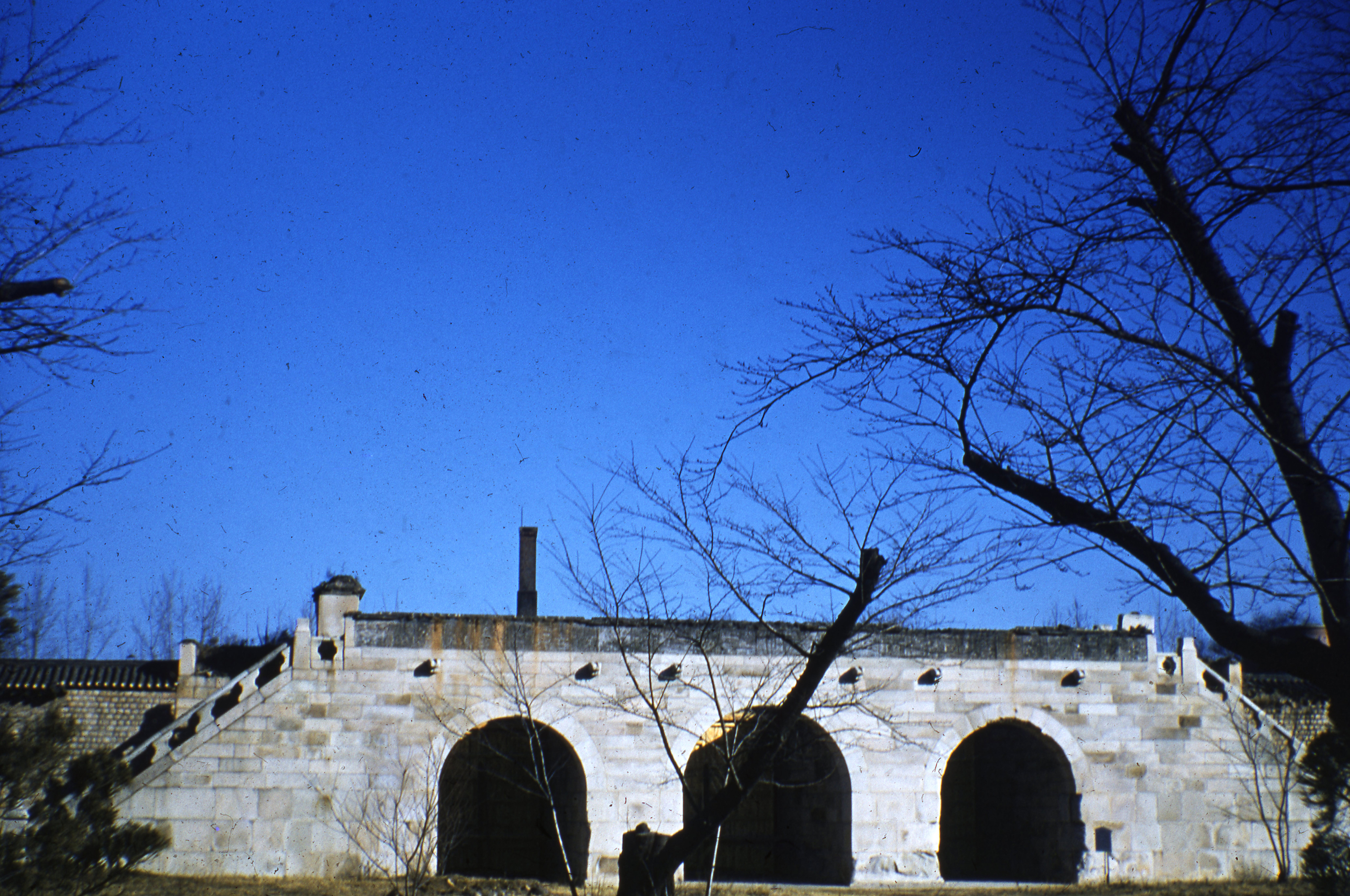
Gwanghwamun, with wooden portion completely destroyed (1952)

== Park Chung Hee era ==
Amidst the May 16 coup of 1961, Park Chung Hee seized power in the country. Part of the Capital Defense Command became stationed in the northwest of the palace that year; after staying in tents, 20 temporary buildings for them were established in 1965. The primary goal of the Park administration was economic development, although it engaged in a number of cultural projects to bolster its legitimacy. In January 1962, he promulgated the Cultural Heritage Protection Act of South Korea, which began managing assets like the palace. On January 21, 1963, the palace was made a Historic Site of South Korea. The budget for maintenance was tight, which affected the scale and quality. 31 small-scale maintenance and restoration projects were carried out on the palace from 1961 to 1967. Structures like Gwanghwamun and Yeongchumun were restored, albeit controversially using reinforced concrete and not in their original spots. Such projects slowed beginning in January 1966, as resources were focused on building the National General Museum of Korea (국립종합박물관; the building now houses the National Folk Museum of Korea) in the palace.

A number of newer buildings were constructed in the palace as well. The National General Museum of Korea was constructed between 1966 and 1972. An annex for that building was completed in 1970. In 1979, a modern-style office building called Husaenggwan (후생관) was completed. In 1982, a traditional-style exhibition hall related to the assassination of Empress Myeongseong (을미사변기록화전시각) was established in Geoncheonggung; it later became used by the National Palace Museum of Korea. Other miscellaneous buildings for things like gift shops and restrooms were also established.

Under the Park administration, the palace was used for a number of public events that have seen been viewed critically. In the 1960s, it hosted a pro wrestling event, (Note: One such match took place on April 8, 1961, and is attested to in this Korean News video.) an American cowboy show, and an ice skating rink. In May 1962, an industrial exhibition was held at the palace to commemorate the one year anniversary of Park's coup. On January 12, 1963, The Chosun Ilbo reported on a plan to build a golf course at the palace, which drew public outrage and caused the plan to be scrapped. The size of the palace was also reduced: in 1967, as part of a road expansion project, around 1,490 pyeong (4,900 m^{2}) of the northeastern section of the palace was demolished, and the Capital Defense Command's space on the palace grounds was increased. Restrictions on future such modifications were enacted in the 1970s.

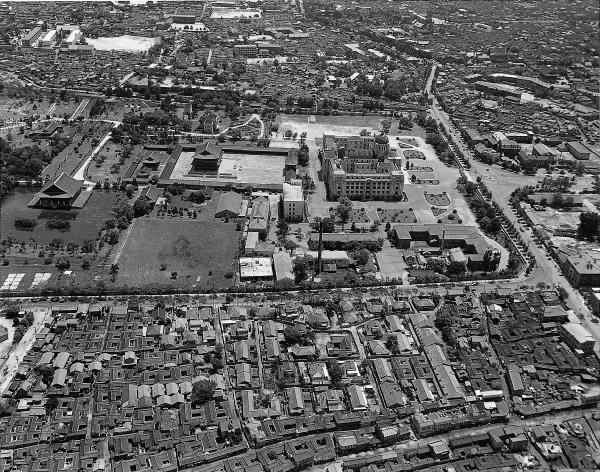
Aerial view of the palace (1965)

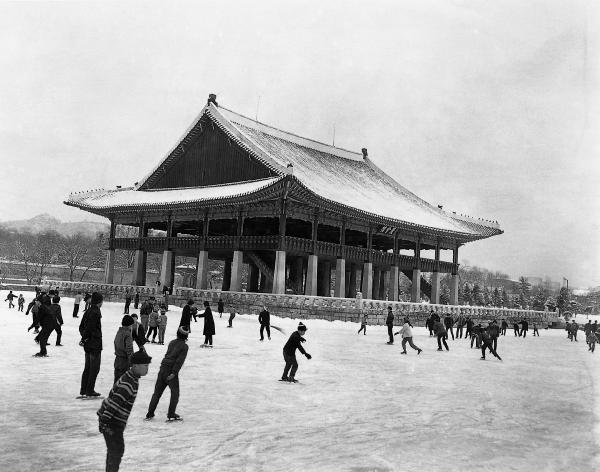
Ice skating at Gyeonghoeru (1965)

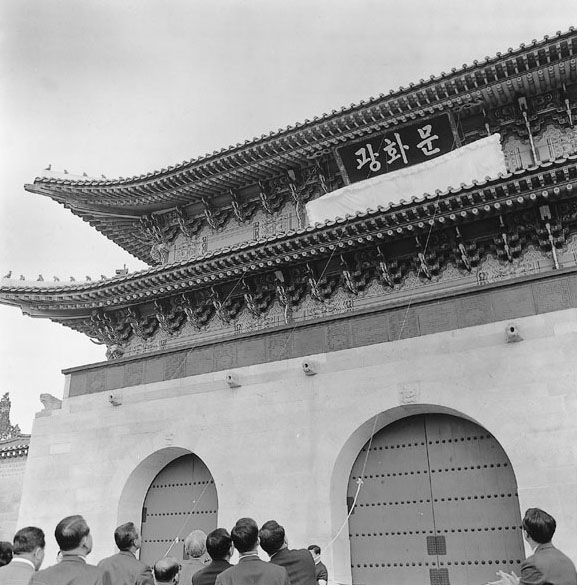
Unveiling of the reconstructed Gwanghwamun, with Hangul calligraphy by Park Chung Hee (1968)

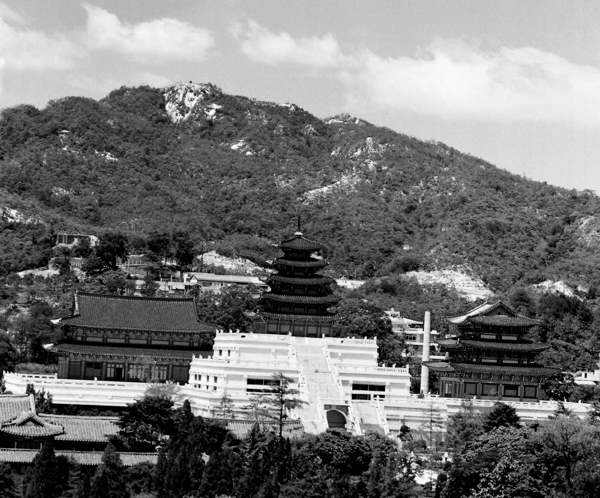
View of the new National General Museum of Korea building (1972)

== Recent restoration efforts ==
The 1980s saw the beginnings of more and higher quality work on preserving South Korean cultural heritage sites. A major architectural survey on Seoul's palaces was conducted from 1983 to 1984. As a result, Geunjeongjeon and Gyeonghoeru were made National Treasures, and Jagyeongjeon, a chimney at Jagyeongjeon, chimneys in Amisan Garden, and Geunjeongmun were made Treasures. On May 22, 1984, a comprehensive management plan for the palaces (Note: 조선왕궁의 복원정화 및 관리개선방) was approved that Shin evaluated as being the first significant post-liberation effort to restore the pre-colonial dignity of the palaces.

In 1990, the First Gyeongbokgung Restoration Plan (경복궁 1차 복원사업) began. The aim was to begin restoring the palace to its Gojong-era state in 1888 (which had around 500 buildings). The plan was to be carried out in five overlapping stages from 1990 to 2009. A 1993 survey had 65.7% of respondents approving of the restoration of the palace and 18.2% opposing.

From 1995 to 1996, the CGB was finally demolished after much public debate. Once it was removed, work began to restore the buildings that formerly occupied its spot. In 1995, the former Government-General of Chōsen Art Museum building was demolished and the remains of Gyeongbokgung's former building Jaseondang (which had been sold and moved to Japan) were returned to Korea. In 1996, the Capital Defense Command buildings were removed. The reenactment of the changing of the guard ceremony began in 2002.

First Gyeongbokgung Restoration Plan

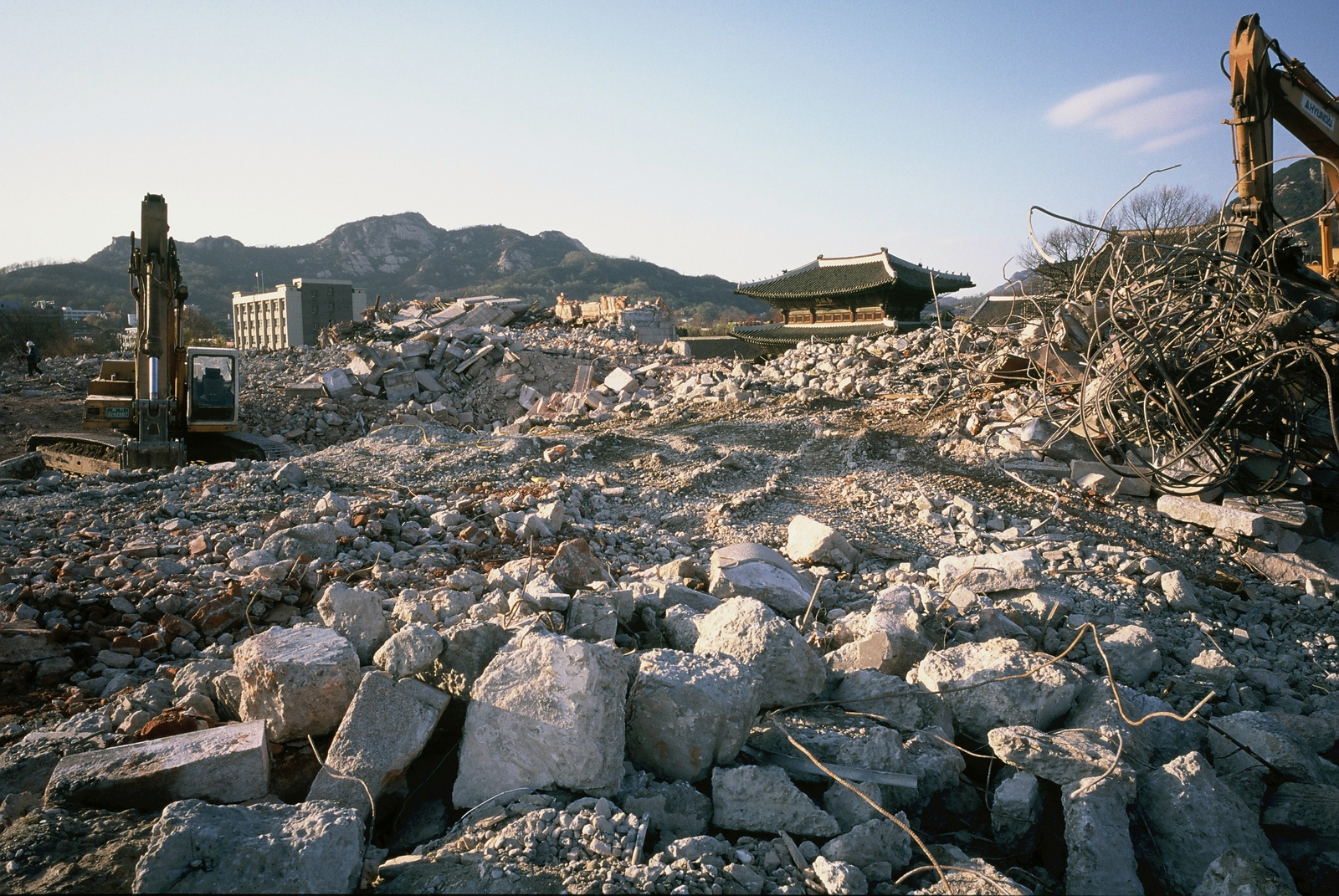
The CGB being demolished (November 1996)

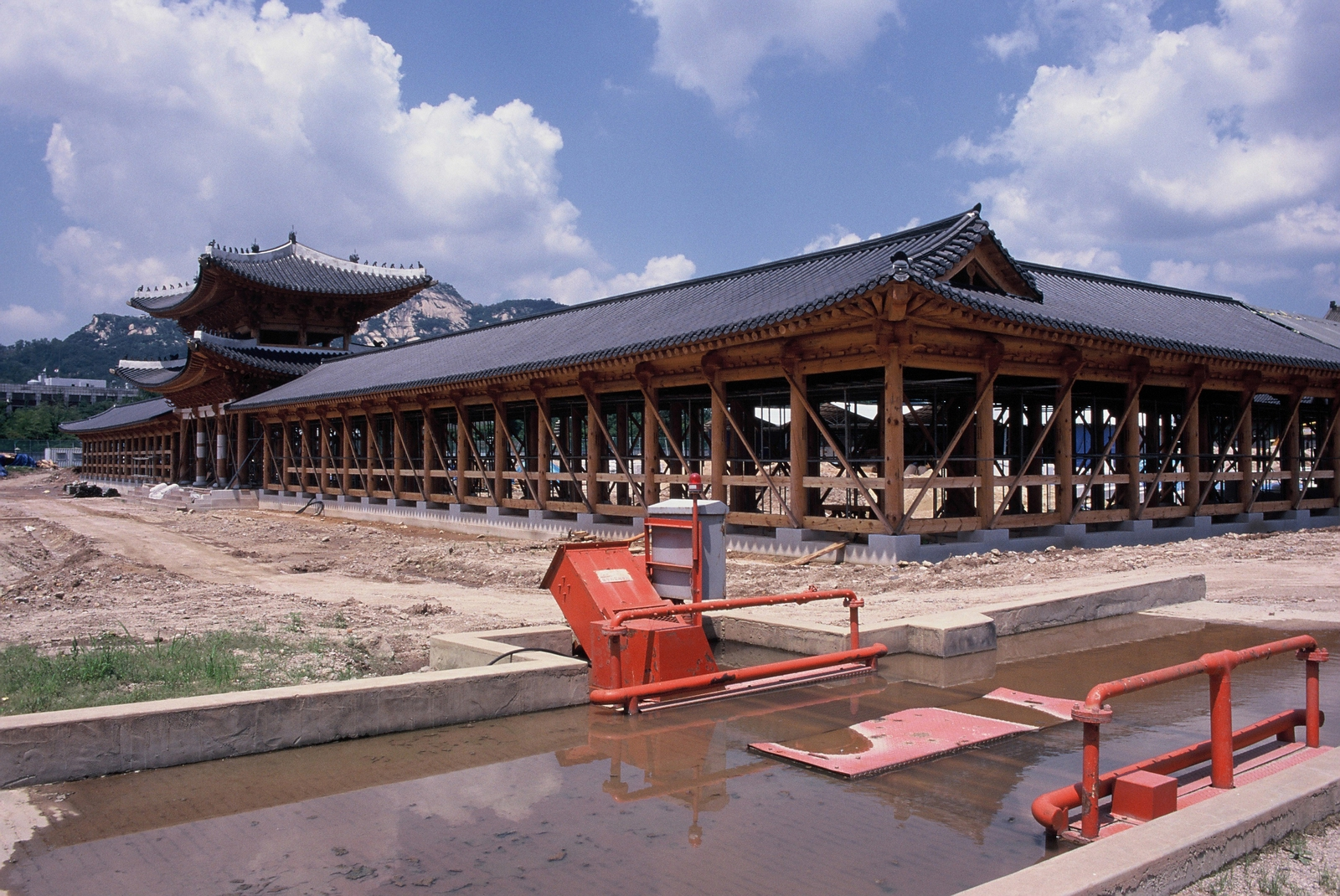
Construction in the palace (August 1999)

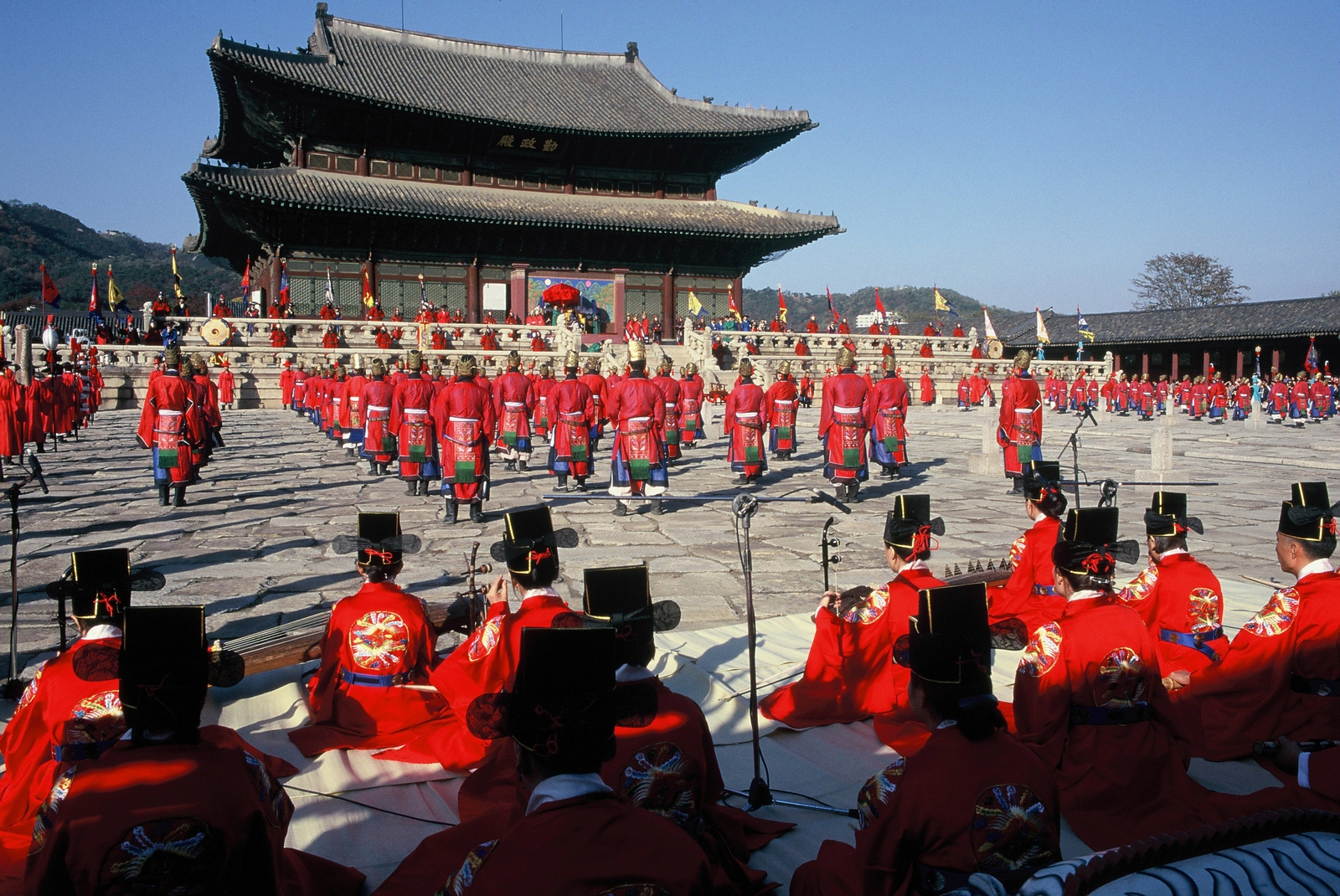
A reenactment of Sejong's coronation (October 1999)

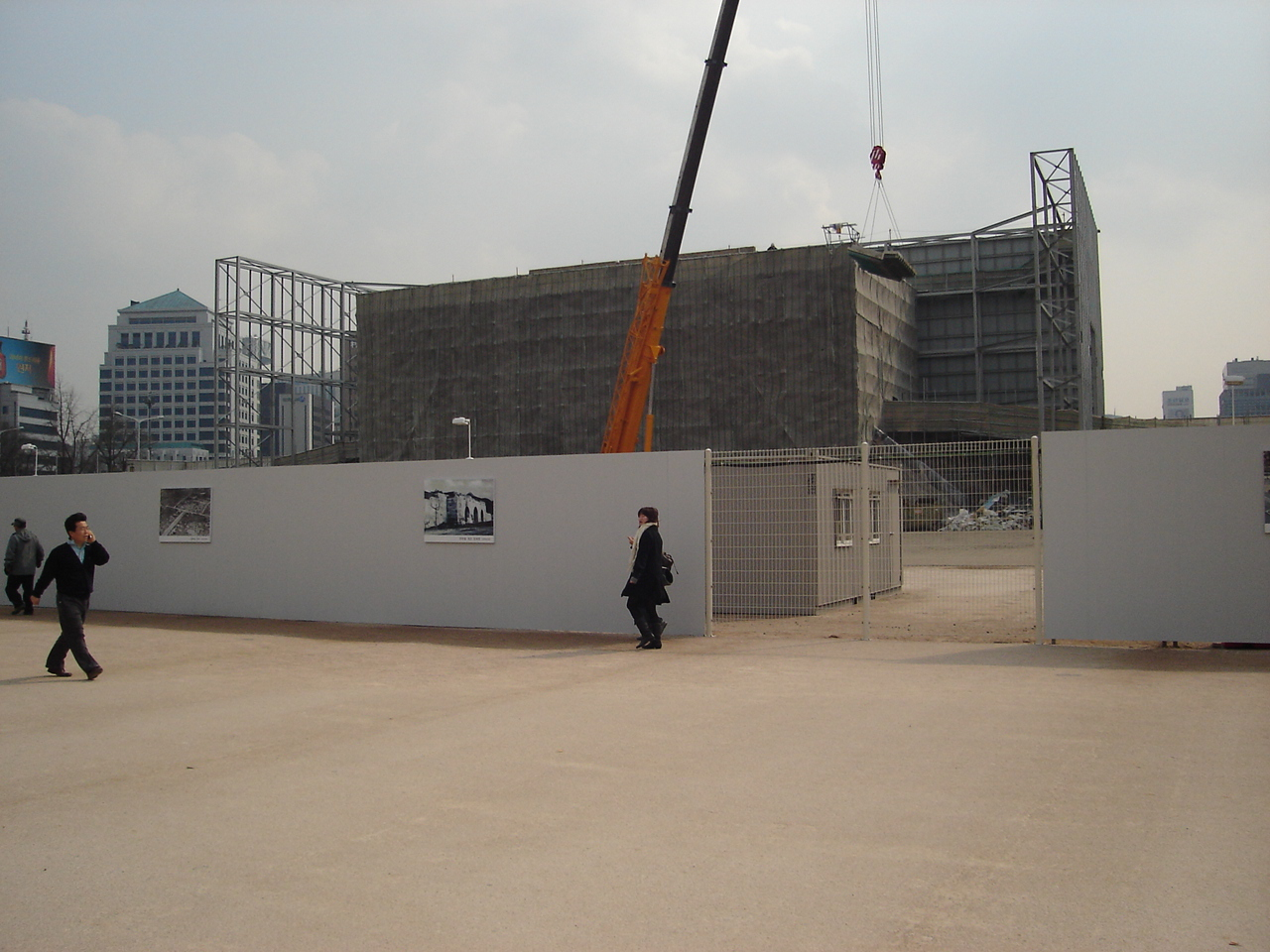
Gwanghwamun being restored (2007)

The First Gyeongbokgung Restoration Plan was completed in 2010. It resulted in the restoration of 89 buildings. At that point, the palace had around 25% of its original buildings.

The Second Gyeongbokgung Restoration Plan (경복궁 2차 복원기본계획) began in 2010. It called for more restorations from 2011 to 2030 in six stages. It called for the restoration of 254 former buildings. The Second Gyeongbokgung Restoration Plan was significantly revised in 2015. It called for both a longer timespan (until 2045) and around a third the number of restored buildings (80). This was due to considerations of reducing impact of construction on visitors and increasing the time for archaeology and research.

In 2020, the plan received a fourth revision. It raised the number of restorations to 90. The total estimated implementation cost for that version of the plan was given as ₩293.82 billion (US$248.95 million).

Second Gyeongbokgung Restoration Plan (Revision 4)
| Stage | Scope | Details |
|---|---|---|
| 1 | 2021–2027; Sojubang and Heungbokjeon areas | Restoration of 30 buildings (21 already completed at time of revision) mainly relating to the life of palace women; Restoration of the Gwanghwamun wŏltae and surrounding area, and moving the xiezhi (haetae) statue to its original location; Maintenance on 16 buildings |
| 2 | 2023–2034; Joseon government offices area | Demolition of the National Palace Museum Annex and a machinery room for the museum; Restoration of 18 buildings mainly relating to the Sejong era of the palace and of the palace streams; Maintenance on 23 buildings |
| 3 | 2030–2038; Seonwonjeon and Mangyeongjeon areas | Demolition of the National Folk Museum; Restoration of 20 buildings mainly relating to ceremonies and rites; Maintenance on 99 buildings |
| 4 | 2035–2041; Honjeon area | Restoration of 9 buildings mainly relating to ancestral rites and funerals; Maintenance on 33 buildings |
| 5 | 2039–2045; Owi offices | Demolition of the parking lot, underground storage facility and tunnel for the National Palace Museum; Restoration of 13 buildings mainly related to the Owi (part of the military). Includes Seosipjagak.; Maintenance on 28 buildings |
