= Chōsen Exhibition =

1929 exhibition in colonial Korea

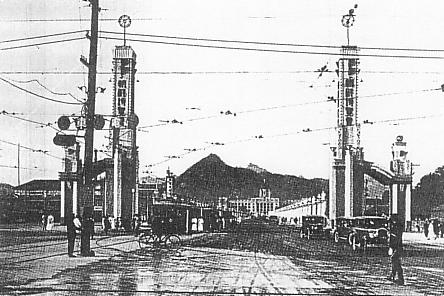
- Entrance to the Exhibition with Japanese General Government Building visible

Overview
- BIE-class: Unrecognized exposition
- Name: Chōsen Exhibition
- Visitors: 986,179

Participant(s)
- Countries: 3

Location
- Country: Korea, Empire of Japan
- City: Keijō (Seoul)
- Venue: Gyeongbokgung
- Coordinates: 37°34′43″N 126°58′38″E

Timeline
- Opening: 12 September 1929
- Closure: 31 October 1929

The Chōsen Exhibition (Japanese: 朝鮮博覧会; Korean: 조선박람회) was held to mark the 20th anniversary of the Japanese colony in Korea. It was held at Gyeongbokgung, Keijō (Seoul), Korea, Empire of Japan between 12 September 1929 and 31 October 1929. It was attended by 986,179 people.

== Background ==
Korea was formally annexed by Japan in 1910. Meanwhile, Japan had been continuing its industrialization, and held a number of expositions within Japan to demonstrate its progress to both its own citizens and to the world.

Japan took over management of the former Korean royal palace Gyeongbokgung, and began reconstructing it to meet their needs. In 1915, they hosted the Chōsen Industrial Exhibition at the palace, and took the opportunity to demolish a number of historic buildings in the palace. They began construction on the Japanese General Government Building. This building would finish being constructed just in time for the 1929 Chōsen Exhibition.

Several years before the Chōsen Exhibition, Emperor Shōwa (Hirohito) ascended to the throne. In 1928, eleven expositions took place in Japan, in part to celebrate the new emperor. For example, the Kyoto Enthronement Commemorative Exhibition (大礼記念京都大博覧会) was held in that year. Scholar Ishikawa Atsuko described advertisements and materials produced for that exposition as similar to materials produced for the Chōsen Exhibition. Furthermore, the Chōsen Exhibition was prominently advertised in the Kyoto exhibition, with maps of Korea and suggested travel itineraries given out to attendees. The Chōsen Exhibition developed in this context, and was further intended to celebrate the nearly twenty years of colonial rule over Korea.

Workers, builders, and artisans visited Korea in significant numbers to prepare for or visit the exhibition. Japanese person Dōji Nakagawa recalled in 1969 that:

All of Japan participated in this event and to that end, Tokyo's expo-builders (ランカイ屋; rankaiya) headed for Keijō one after another... Office workers of decorating companies, carpenters, painters, machine craftsmen, illustrators and so on, guys from every prefecture and every company had taken a lodging in Keijō; no matter where you walked in the town, you would bump into someone you knew... Each pavilion on the site [was] almost the same as the conventional exposition format... As Keijō [had] few lodging places, we occasionally rented several private houses. We would ask the master of the house to help us on the site in daytime and provide catering, while at night we would stay in a house of his relatives'.

The colonial government used the occasion to promote further changes to the city. It engaged in a grading project around the palace, and built roads. It developed a high-class residential area north of the palace.

== Description ==
The exhibition was organized into various pavilions. Various industries and sectors occupied each of the pavilions; examples include a Domestic Pavilion (for goods from Japan), a Ministry of Railways Pavilion, Electric Machine Pavilion, Rice Pavilion, and pavilions for each of the various provinces of Korea. Products were prominently displayed in windows and shelves. Various businesses, especially the major department stores in Keijō like Mitsukoshi and Takashimaya, had booths in these pavilions. Some exhibits would demonstrate both Japanese and Korean arts and crafts. One area of the exhibition, a Children's Land, had a train. The train would pass through a tunnel that was decorated with images of elephants in India.

The Japanese robot Gakutensoku, the first robot built in Asia, was displayed at a booth for the Osaka Mainichi Shimbun newspaper.

The Architectural Association of Chōsen had a display of three model houses showing modern housing.
