= List of landmarks in Gyeongbokgung =

Landmarks in the Korean palace

Gyeongbokgung (Korean: 경복궁; Hanja: 景福宮; pronounced [kjʌŋbok̚k͈uŋ]) is a former royal palace in Seoul, South Korea. It was the first royal palace of the Joseon dynasty, having been established in 1395. The palace has had a varying number of landmarks and features over time.

The palace was greatly expanded upon during the reign of Sejong the Great (r. 1418–1450). Afterwards, it remained in a roughly stable state for around 100 years, with the exception of a major fire it experienced in 1553. The palace was completely destroyed in the 4th month of 1592, during the 1592–1598 Imjin War. The site remained abandoned until it was rebuilt from 1865 to 1873. The palace experienced two major fires in 1873 and 1876. Reconstruction after the fires concluded in 1888. At that point, the palace had around 500 buildings.

Beginning in the 1900s, amidst its efforts to colonize Korea, the Empire of Japan began altering the palace, in order to deemphasize its role as a symbol of the Korean monarchy. During the 1910–1945 colonial period, hundreds of palace's buildings were demolished or altered. After the 1945 liberation of Korea, a number of newer buildings and facilities were constructed in the palace. Beginning in the 1980s, efforts began to restore the palace to its pre-colonial state. The 1990–2010 First Gyeongbokgung Restoration Plan (경복궁 1차 복원사업) resulted in the recreation of 89 buildings. The 2010–2045 Second Gyeongbokgung Restoration Plan (경복궁 2차 복원기본계획) currently calls for the restoration of 90 buildings and the demolition of some post-colonial additions to the palace.

== Current landmarks ==
=== Outer walls ===
Construction on the palace's outer walls (궁성; 宮城; kungsŏng or 궁장; 宮牆; kungjang) began in 1398, after the palace's 1395 establishment. 3,700 soldiers were mobilized for the task. The walls were completed in 1400. They were the first structures to be rebuilt during the 19th-century reconstruction. They were modified numerous times in the 20th century; since the late 20th century efforts have been made to restore their pre-colonial states and locations. The walls are currently made of stone with wood and tiles on top. A 2007 study gave the total length of the walls as 2,469.4 m (8,102 ft), with heights ranging from 2 to 7.5 m (6.6 to 24.6 ft) and depths 0.5 to 3.2 m (1.6 to 10.5 ft). Walls on the north side of the palace tend to be taller than others. The wall has four major gates, a number of minor gates, and several openings for the palace stream (수문; 水門; sumun). Each gate in the wall had facilities inside for palace guards.

Image	Structure
	Gwanghwamun (광화문; 光化門; Kwanghwamun) The main and south gate. It was completed in the 9th month of 1395. It was named by Sejong in 1426. After being destroyed in 1592 during the Imjin War, it was rebuilt in the 10th month of 1865. In 1923, its wŏltae was destroyed to make way for tram tracks. In 1927, it was relocated north of Geonchunmun, near what is now the National Folk Museum. During the Korean War, its wooden portion completely burned down. In 1968, it was controversially reconstructed using modern materials northwest of its original spot; it then served as the main entrance to the CGB. From 2006 to 2010, it was restored to its pre-colonial state. Its wŏltae was restored in 2023.
	Geonchunmun (건춘문; 建春門; Kŏnch'unmun; 'Beginning of Spring Gate') The east gate. It was named in 1426. It was repaired in 1428. After being destroyed in 1592, it was rebuilt in 1865. It was originally only meant for use by civil servants. However, during the colonial period and around the time of the construction of the Government-General of Chōsen Building, it became used as the main gate of the palace. It is mostly identical in form to Yeongchumun.
	Yeongchumun (영추문; 迎秋門; Yŏngch'umun; 'Welcoming Autumn Gate') The west gate. It was first built in 1398. It was destroyed in 1592 and rebuilt in 1865. It partially collapsed on April 27, 1926 and was then destroyed. In 1975, it was restored, although around 45 m (148 ft) north of its original location and using reinforced concrete. In 2018, it became available for public use as a regular entrance to the palace. It is set to be restored to its original location around 2023 to 2034.
	Sinmumun (신무문; 神武門; 'Black Turtle-Snake Gate') The north gate, often used by military personnel, although it was generally closed off. It was built in 1433. Sinmumun was named in 1475 for the mythical guardian of the north. That guardian is also painted on the ceiling of the gate. After being destroyed in 1592, it was rebuilt in 1865 and has persisted to the present. It was closed to the public from 1961 to either 2006 or 2007 for security reasons.
	Dongsipjagak (동십자각; 東十字閣; Tongsipchagak) A watchtower that used to be on the eastern palace walls. It was likely originally built in 1398 and demolished in 1427. It was rebuilt in the 6th month of 1866. It became separated from the palace walls around the 1929 Chōsen Exhibition. It served as the centerpoint of the outer main entrance to the entrance of the exhibit; the relocated Gwanghwamun was the inner main entrance.

=== Oejo ===
The oejo (외조; 外朝) is the outermost and most public-facing part of Joseon palaces. It was where public disputes were dealt with and laws were promulgated.

==== Chŏngjŏn ====
The chŏngjŏn (정전; 正殿) of Joseon palaces was the area where the king received tribute. It is where the main halls or throne rooms of each palace are located. It typically has a large open space (such as a wŏltae) for public outdoor rituals. The gate used to enter the chŏngjŏn is called the chŏnmun (전문; 殿門).

Image	Structure
	Heungnyemun (흥례문; 興禮門; Hŭngnyemun) The second gate of the three gate system. It went by the names Jeongmun (정문; 正門; Chŏngmun) and Hongnyemun (홍례문; 弘禮門). It received its current name when it was rebuilt during the Gojong era. It was demolished in July 1914, and the Government-General of Chōsen Building was built in its place. After that building was demolished, Heungnyemun was reconstructed between 1997 and 2001.
	Yeongjegyo (영제교; 永濟橋; Yŏngjegyo) The palace kŭmch'ŏn'gyo (bridge over a kŭmch'ŏn). It passes over the stream Myeongdangsu and is made of stone. Passing the bridge was seen as ceremonially entering the inner sanctum of the palace. It was likely completed in 1395. It was named in 1426. In 1916, during the construction of the Government-General of Chōsen Building, Yeongjegyo was disassembled and its remains moved to the west of the Government-General Museum of Chōsen. In the 1950s, it was installed in front of Sujeongjeon. It was again moved to the west of Geonchunmun in the 1970s. It was restored to its original location in 1996, 1997, or 2001. It is around 10 m (33 ft) wide and 13 m (43 ft) long.
	Gibyeolcheong (기별청; 奇別廳; Kibyŏlch'ŏng) A building used by a government department of the same name. The department was responsible for aggregating information from various parts of the palace and relaying it elsewhere in the form of a government gazette entitled Chobo (조보; 朝報). The building was rebuilt in 2001.
	Geunjeongmun (근정문; 勤政門; Kŭnjŏngmun; 'Governing Diligently Gate') The third gate of the three gate system, entrance to the ch'ijo and main hall, (Note: Such gates are called chŏnmun (전문; 殿門).) and a designated Treasure. It was built in 1395. After being destroyed in 1592, it was rebuilt in 1867. The gate has survived in this state to the present. It is flanked by two smaller gates, Ilhwamun (일화문; 日華門) and Wolhwamun (월화문; 月華門; Wŏrhwamun), which were named in 1426. It has two stories and a staircase between Ilhwamun and Geunjeongmun.
	Geunjeongjeon (근정전; 勤政殿; Kŭnjŏngjŏn; 'Governing Diligently Hall') The main hall (Note: In Korean, chŏngjŏn (정전; 正殿).) of the palace and a designated National Treasure. It was used for major events like ceremonies and the issuing of edicts. It was completed in 1395. Five kings were crowned here, including Sejong in 1418. It was destroyed in 1592 and reconstructed in 1867. It has remained in much the same form to the present. It is the largest main hall of all Joseon palaces and is regarded as examplary of late-Joseon architecture. Like other Joseon main halls, it has a wŏltae in front used for ceremonies.

==== P'yŏnjŏn ====
The p'yŏnjŏn (편전; 便殿) of Joseon palaces is the area where the king performs his daily private work, similar to an office. The king generally spends more time in this area than in the chŏngjŏn.

Image	Structure
	Sajeongjeon (사정전; 思政殿; Sajŏngjŏn; 'Thinking of Good Deeds Hall') The main building of the p'yŏnjŏn. It was completed in 1395. After being destroyed in 1592, it was rebuilt in 1867. The building's exterior has since survived until the present. The building is on top of a three-tiered stone platform. The interior is a single, large, elaborately painted room with a throne.
	Manchunjeon (만춘전; 萬春殿; Manch'unjŏn; 'Ten Thousand Springs Hall') East annex to Sajeongjeon. Its name indicates both a long duration of time and contains the season spring, which corresponds to east in Chinese tradition. It is first attested to in 1423. It was rebuilt in 1865, and has persisted to the present. This version of the building is located closer to Sajeongjeon than its predecessor. It was severely damaged during the Korean War and restored afterwards.
	Cheonchujeon (천추전; 千秋殿; Ch'ŏnch'ujŏn; 'Thousand Autumns Hall') West annex to Sajeongjeon. Its name carries similar meaning to Manchunjeon's; autumn corresponds to west in Chinese tradition. It is first attested to in 1423. After being destroyed in 1592, it was rebuilt in 1867 and has remained to the present. The Gojong-era reconstruction is located closer to Sajeongjeon than its predecessor.

==== Government offices ====
There have been a varying number of facilities for government offices in the palace (궐내각사; 闕內各司; kwŏllaegaksa) over time. A 1530 record listed the following organizations in the palace: Sŭngjŏngwŏn, Hongmun'gwan, Sangsŏwŏn, Ch'unch'ugwan, Yemun'gwan, Sŭngmunwŏn, Kyosŏgwan, Saongwŏn, Naeŭiwŏn, Sangŭiwŏn, Saboksa (사복사; 司僕寺), Sadosa (사도사; 司導寺), Kwansanggam, Sejasigangwŏn, Chŏnsŏlsa, Chŏnyŏnsa (전연사; 典涓司), Naebanwŏn (내반원; 內班院), and Owidoch'ongbu (오위도총부; 五衛都摠府). Most of their facilities were concentrated in the southwest of the palace, south of Gyeonghoeru. In 1865, part of Gyeonghuigung was demolished and its materials were used to rebuild various government office buildings in Gyeongbokgung. At its peak, the Gojong-era government offices had around 200 rooms total; eventually all buildings but Sujeongjeon were demolished. Many of the demolitions occurred in advance of the 1915 Chōsen Industrial Exhibition.

Image	Structure
	Sujeongjeon (수정전; 修政殿; Sujŏngjŏn; 'Skillful Statecraft Hall') A building used by various government offices over time, and a designated Treasure. It was a key facility involved in the invention of Hangul. It was destroyed in 1592 and rebuilt in 1867. This form of the building has largely persisted to the present. From 1966 to 1975, it was occupied by a predecessor to the National Folk Museum. Unusually for a side hall, it has a large wŏltae. It has rear chimneys, which likely allowed for the use of ondol heated floors.

=== Naejo ===
==== Ch'imjŏn ====
The ch'imjŏn (침전; 寢殿) of Joseon palaces is a private section of the palace containing the bedrooms and offices of the royal family.

Image	Structure
	Gangnyeongjeon (강녕전; 康寧殿; Kangnyŏngjŏn) The king's quarters. It was named by Chŏng Tojŏn after the third of the Five Blessings. It was completed in 1395. It was renovated in 1433. It was destroyed in the 1553 fire and rebuilt. It was again destroyed in 1592. It was destroyed in the 1876 fire and was rebuilt in 1888. It was used as an art gallery during the 1915 Chōsen Industrial Exhibition. After the 1917 Changdeokgung fire, it was disassembled and moved to Changdeokgung.
	Yeonsaengjeon (연생전; 延生殿; Yŏnsaengjŏn; 'Arise Hall') East annex of Gangnyeongjeon. It was completed in 1395. It and Gyeongseongjeon were named by Chŏng Tojŏn; together their names are interpreted as the cycle of things beginning and bearing fruit. It was destroyed in the 1553 fire and rebuilt. It was destroyed in the 1876 fire. After the 1917 Changdeokgung fire, it was disassembled and moved to Changdeokgung.
	Gyeongseongjeon (경성전; 慶成殿; Kyŏngsŏngjŏn; 'Bear Fruit Hall') West annex of Gangnyeongjeon. It was completed in 1395. It was destroyed in the 1553 fire and rebuilt. It was destroyed in the 1876 fire. After the 1917 Changdeokgung fire, it was disassembled and moved to Changdeokgung.
	Yeongildang (연길당; 延吉堂; Yŏn'giltang) The hall was a new addition during the Gojong-era reconstsruction. After the 1917 Changdeokgung fire, it was disassembled and moved to Changdeokgung. It is not known how the building was used.
	Eungjidang (응지당; 膺祉堂; Ŭngjidang) The hall was a new addition during the Gojong-era reconstruction. It is not known how the building was used.
	Gyotaejeon (교태전; 交泰殿; Kyot'aejŏn; 'Coalescence Hall') It was originally built in 1440. It is named for a phrase in the Chinese text I Ching, "天地交泰", which means "heaven and earth coalesce". It was destroyed in the 1553 fire and rebuilt. It was destroyed in 1592. After being rebuilt by Gojong, it was used as the queen's bedchambers. It was again destroyed in the 1876 fire. After the 1917 Changdeokgung fire, the Japanese demolished Gyotaejeon and Gangnyeongjeon and used their materials to rebuild Changdeokgung. These are now the buildings Huijeongdang and Daejojeon in Changdeokgung. The current forms of Gyotaejeon and Gangnyeongjeon in Gyeongbokgung were built in 1995.
	Amisan (아미산; 峨嵋山) A garden constructed using soil excavated during the construction of Gyeonghoeru's pond. Chimneys in the garden are designated Treasures.
	Heumgyeonggak (흠경각; 欽敬閣; Hŭmgyŏnggak) It was completed in 1438. It is named for a phrase from the Book of Documents: "欽若昊天 敬授人時". This phrase means "respect the heavens and tell the people the time". It was destroyed in the 1553 fire and rebuilt. In 1865, Eojodang and Yungbokjeon of Gyeonghuigung were demolished and recycled to build Heumgyeonggak. It was destroyed in the 1876 fire and rebuilt in 1888. After the 1917 Changdeokgung fire, it was disassembled and moved to that palace in 1920.
	Hamwonjeon (함원전; 咸元殿; Hamwŏnjŏn) It was spared by the 1553 fire. It was destroyed in the 1876 fire. After the 1917 Changdeokgung fire, it was disassembled and moved to Changdeokgung.
	Sojubang (소주방; 燒廚房) The royal kitchen that produced Korean royal court cuisine. It was rebuilt in 1867. It was demolished in 1915 for the Chōsen Industrial Exhibition. Afterwards, its former site remained empty until it was excavated in 2004. It was restored by 2017.

==== Yŏnch'im ====
The yŏnch'im (연침; 燕寢) in Joseon palaces were various bedchambers used ritually in rotation by the king depending on the Korean calendar. There were typically multiple yŏnch'im that were in various cardinal directions from the main part of the palace. When the palace was first established, Gangnyeongjeon was designated a yŏnch'im.

Image	Structure
	Jagyeongjeon (자경전; 慈慶殿; Chagyŏngjŏn) A designated Treasure. It was in Jagyeongjeon that the 1873 fire began; the fire destroyed the building. It was again destroyed in the 1876 fire. During the colonial period, it was used as a museum office. During the 1929 Chōsen Exhibition, it was surrounded by various exhibition buildings and a children's theme park. Its decorated chimney is also a designated Treasure.
	Jesuhap (제수합; 齊壽閤; Chesuhap) A building to the east of Jagyeongjeon. It was an annex of Mangyeongjeon, although that building was demolished in 1917. It is now part of the grounds of the National Folk Museum. It was first built in 1867. In the late 1960s, it became a part of the National General Museum complex. Annex buildings for it are set to be restored between 2030 and 2038.

==== East Palace ====
The East Palace (동궁; 東宮; Donggung; Tonggung) is the eastern part of Joseon palaces that was meant for the daily life of the crown prince. Gyeongbokgung's East Palace was first built in 1427. It was initially located outside of what was considered the palace proper. It was in the East Palace that the major 1553 fire began; this area was destroyed and rebuilt. It was demolished in July 1914 to make way for the 1915 Chōsen Industrial Exhibition.

Image	Structure
	Jaseondang (자선당; 資善堂; Chasŏndang). One of the main buildings used for the education of the crown prince. It was first built in 1427. It was destroyed in 1592 and rebuilt in 1865. It was again destroyed in the 1867 fire, and was rebuilt by 1888. In 1914, the building was sold and later reassembled in the private home of Japanese businessman Ōkura Kihachirō in Tokyo. It was destroyed in the 1923 Great Kantō earthquake. Its remains were returned to Korea around 1996, and are now on display near Geoncheonggung. In 2001, Jaseondang was rebuilt on its original spot.
	Bihyeongak (비현각; 丕顯閣; Pihyŏn'gak; 'Unclear Building') A building used by the crown prince. Before the Imjin War, it was used by the king for a variety of purposes. It is named for a phrase from the Book of Documents, "昧爽不顯", which means "unclear". It was originally named Bihyeonhap (비현합; 丕顯閤; Pihyŏnhap). It was completed in 1463. It received its current name during the reign of King Jungjong. It was restored in 1527. It was destroyed in the 1553 fire and rebuilt. It was destroyed in 1592, and rebuilt during Gojong's reign. It then began to be used by the crown prince. It was sold in July 1914 and demolished in advance of the 1915 Chōsen Industrial Exhibition.
	Gyejodang (계조당; 繼照堂; Kyejodang) It was originally built in 1443 for use by the future King Munjong, when he was acting as regent on behalf of his father Sejong. It was demolished in 1452, upon the reign of King Munjong. It was reconstructed beginning in 1868. It was reconstructed in 1891. It was demolished around 1910. It was restored from 2017 to 2023.

==== Naejŏn ====
The naejŏn (내전; 內殿; naejeon) of Joseon palaces was the more private part of the palaces for the daily life of the royal family.

Image	Structure
	Heungbokjeon (흥복전; 興福殿; Hŭngbokchŏn) It was rebuilt in 1867. At the time, it was used as a sleeping quarters for palace women. Its foundation was built using timber from the demolished structures of the detached palace Ch'angŭigung. From 1885 onwards, it was used for political meetings and lectures. It was disassembled and moved to Changdeokgung after that palace's 1917 fire. Its former site was turned into a Japanese-style garden.
	Hamhwadang (함화당; 咸和堂; Hamhwadang) (pictured); Jipgyeongdang (집경당; 緝敬堂; Chipkyŏngdang); Both buildings were completed in 1890. They have since remained to the present.
	Gyeonghoeru (경회루; 慶會樓; Kyŏnghoeru; 'Virtuous Meeting Building') An elevated hall on an artificial island in an artificial pond. The hall was meant for hosting banquets for dignitaries. It is a designated National Treasure. It was first completed in the 4th month of 1412. The original form was smaller than the current. It was destroyed in 1592 and rebuilt in 1867. This form has remained to the present. The building has 35 rooms that are supported by stone pillars. The building's features symbolize a number of concepts in numerology.
	Hahyangjeong (하향정; 荷香亭; Hahyangjŏng) A Joseon-style pavilion that is a modern addition to the palace. It was constructed in 1950 and is located to the northeast of Gyeonghoeru. It was constructed for South Korean president Syngman Rhee, who used it for fishing and leisure. Whether to demolish it has been controversial. The Cultural Heritage Administration decided to keep the building on November 13, 2013.

=== Pinjŏn and honjŏn ===
The pinjŏn (빈전; 殯殿) of a Joseon palace is where funerals were conducted. After the funeral, mourning and ancestor worship rituals are conducted at the honjŏn (혼전; 魂殿).

Image	Structure
	Taewonjeon (태원전; 泰元殿; T'aewŏnjŏn) A complex used for funerary rites and as a temporary residence. It did not exist before the Imjin War; it was first built in 1865. It was used for the 1890 funeral of Queen Sinjeong and 1895 funeral of Empress Myeongseong. During the colonial period, it was moved to Deoksugung, where it was later demolished. The Capital Defense Command occupied its former spot until 1996. It was restored in 2005. Buildings in the complex include Yeongsajae (영사재; 永思齋; Yŏngsajae), Gongmukjae (공묵재; 恭默齋; Kongmukchae), and Sungmundang (숙문당; 肅聞堂; Sungmundang).

=== Geoncheonggung ===
Geoncheonggung (건청궁; 乾淸宮; Kŏnch'ŏnggung) was a residence constructed in the northern part of the palace in 1873. It was likely spared by the 1876 fire. In 1885, it began to be used as the primary residence of Gojong, as the naejŏn had yet to be repaired. He would reside here for around 12 years. In 1887, the first electric light in Korea was lit here. It was demolished around 1907 to 1909, 1909, or 1929 during the Chōsen Exhibition. In its place, the Government-General Art Museum of Chōsen was established. That museum was demolished in 1998. Geoncheonggung was reconstructed in 2006. The residence was used to receive envoys. It is divided into an anchae (section for women) and sarangchae (section for men).

Image	Structure
	Jangandang (장안당; 長安堂; Changandang) A building in the west side of Geoncheonggung. It received its name around 1888. It has a corridor that connects it to Gonnyeonghap.
	Gonnyeonghap (곤녕합; 坤寧閤; Konnyŏnghap) A building in the west side of Geoncheonggung. This building was the location of the 1895 assassination of Empress Myeongseong.
	Parujeong (팔우정; 八隅亭; P'arujŏng); Jibokjae (집옥재; 集玉齋; Chibokchae); Hyeopgildang (협길당; 協吉堂; Hyŏpkiltang); Three buildings in the back of the palace. They are connected by corridors. Together, the buildings were used as Gojong's library and study. These buildings are post-Imjin War additions to the palace. Jibokjae and Hyeopgildang were built using materials from Changdeokgung around 1891 to 1893. Parujeong is an original building that was built in 1891. It was used for book storage. The three buildings have remained to the present. In April 2016, Jibokjae reopened as a small library.
	Hyangwonjeong (향원정; 香遠亭; Hyangwŏnjŏng; 'Far-spreading Fragrance Pavilion') A pavilion on an island in the pond Hyangwonji (향원지; 香遠池). It was built some time between 1867 and 1873. The island's bridge, Chwihyanggyo (취향교; 醉香橋; Ch'wihyanggyo; 'Intoxicated by Fragrance Bridge'), was completed in 1873. It was the longest wooden bridge built over a pond during the Joseon period. The bridge was initially located to the north of the pavilion, but after it was destroyed by a bombing during the 1950–1953 Korean War, it was rebuilt to the south side in 1953. In 2021, the bridge was restored to its original location.

=== Museums and other structures ===
==== National Palace Museum of Korea and related facilities ====
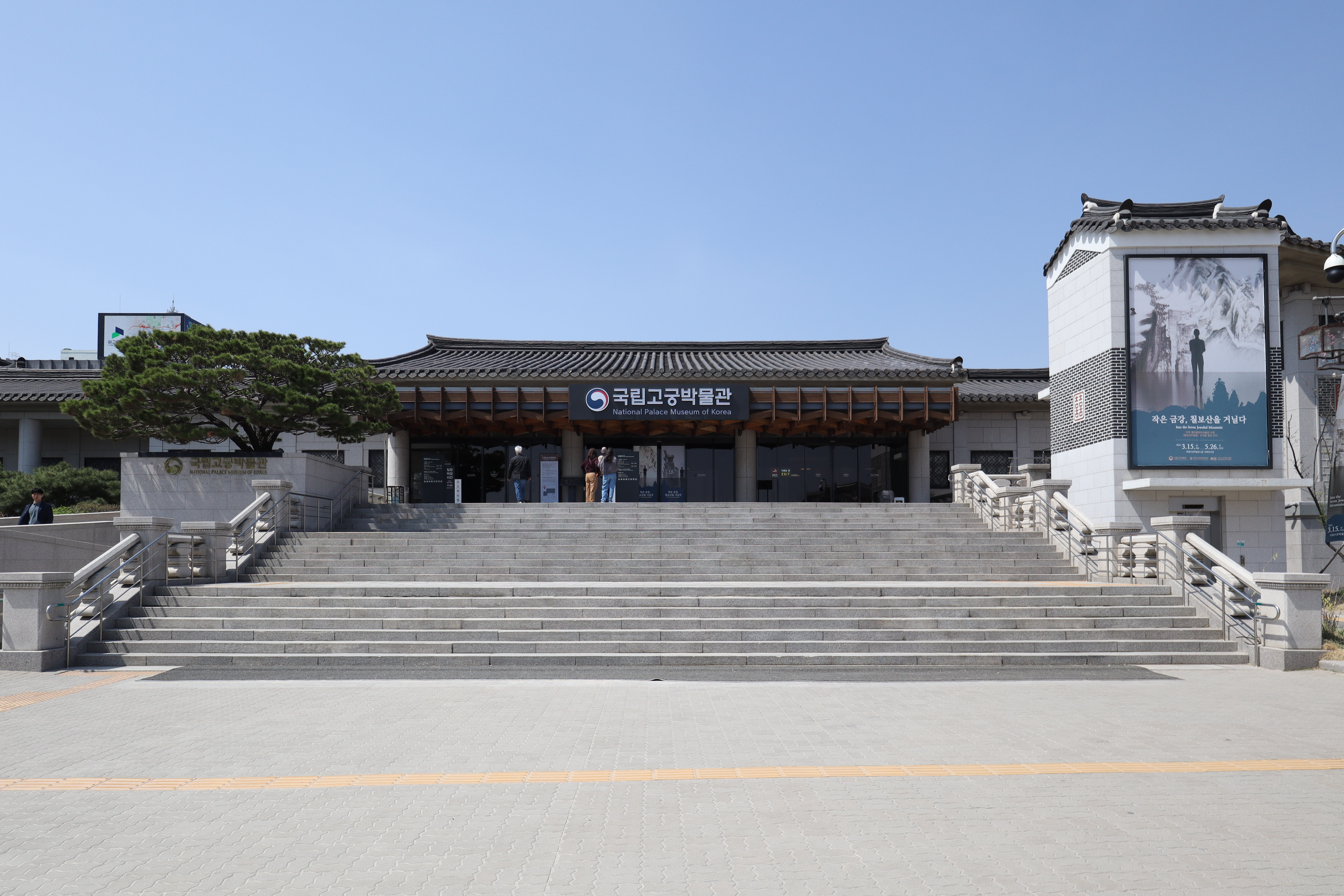
National Palace Museum main building (2024)

The National Palace Museum of Korea is located in a modern three-story building on the palace grounds. Until 2005, the building housed the National Museum of Korea. Its collection aggregates various artifacts from the former Korean royal family. It was debated whether to demolish the museum as part of the original Second Gyeongbokgung Restoration Plan. The current and fourth iteration of the plan, which runs until 2045, does not call for its demolition.

There is an underground storage facility in the west side of the palace that is currently used by the National Palace Museum of Korea. The facility was originally built in 1962 as a bunker for South Korean government officials in the CGB. The National Museum of Korea began using it in 1983 and the National Palace Museum began using it in 2005. As the facility holds numerous historic relics, including 4 National Treasures, it is closed to the public. In 2016, limited public tours of the facility were offered for the first time. It has an area of 5,123.34 m^{2} (55,147.2 ft^{2}) and height of 5.7 m (19 ft). It is connected to the National Palace Museum via an underground tunnel that is approximately 300 m (980 ft) long and 2.4 m (7.9 ft) wide. The tunnel was installed in 1997 to aid travel between the two locations. The facility and tunnel are set to be demolished some time between 2039 and 2045.

==== National Folk Museum of Korea ====
The museum buildings (2026)

The National Folk Museum of Korea's current building is a modern-style building with three floors above ground and one below. It is located on the former site of the Seonwonjeon complex. The museum building first opened in August 1972, and was used by the National General Museum of Korea (국립종합박물관), a predecessor to the National Museum of Korea. Meanwhile, a predecessor to the current National Folk Museum had been operating in Sujeongjeon in the palace since October 4, 1966. The National Folk Museum received its current building in 1992, and it opened to the public on February 17, 1993. The building is set to be demolished in 2026 and the museum relocated to Sejong City. Seonwonjeon will then be restored.

==== Gyeongbokgung Palace Management Office building ====
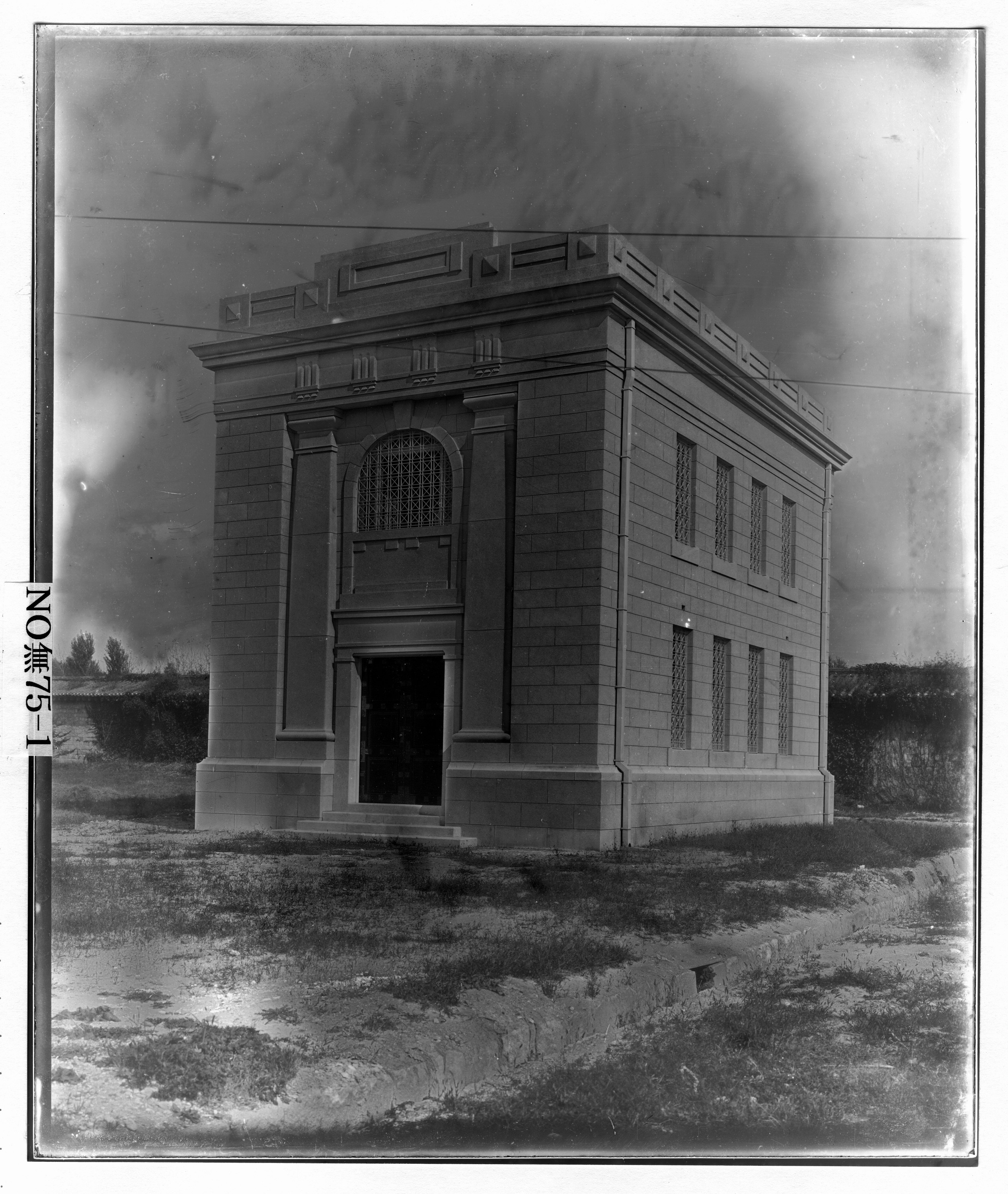
Colonial-era photo of the Gyeongbokgung Palace Management Office building

The Gyeongbokgung Palace Management Office (GPMO; 경복궁 관리소) is headquartered in a small modern-style building in the palace from the colonial period. Construction began on it on June 24, 1914. The building was completed in 1915. It was originally meant to serve as an annex for either the Government-General of Chōsen Building or the Government-General Museum of Chōsen. It became used by the Cultural Heritage Administration in 1961 and then by the GPMO in 1971. It was originally planned to be demolished as part of the first Gyeongbokgung Restoration Plan. It was renovated in 2007. The second floor is an office space, and the first floor is designed to help quickly mitigate disasters in the palace.

The current Gyeongbokgung Restoration Plan does not advocate for demolishing the building. A politician and a journalist have argued for its demolition, with the latter arguing that maintaining the building contradicts the plans' goal of restoring the palace to its precolonial state.

==== Parking lot ====
There is currently a parking lot on what used to be the site of the Owi headquarters. The parking lot has space for 290 vehicles, with one floor underground and one above. It is set to be demolished some time between 2039 and 2045.

== Landmarks to be restored ==
=== Outer walls ===
Seosipjagak (서십자각; 西十字閣; Sŏsipchagak) was a watchtower on the western palace walls. It was likely originally built in 1398 and demolished in 1427. It was rebuilt in the 6th month of 1866. It was demolished in 1923 or 1927 to make way for the tram. It is set to be restored around 2039 to 2045.

=== Government offices ===
- Ŭiyakch'ŏng (의약청; 醫藥廳) building. Ŭiyakch'ŏng was a medical organization that managed the health of the royal family. It was first attested to in 1625. It had an acupuncture clinic, kitchen, and office. It was demolished likely around 1915.
- Okdang (옥당; also called Hongmun'gwan) building. That department managed royal records, documents, written communications, and advising the king. It was likely demolished around 1910 to 1915.
- Chŏngwŏn (정원; also called Sŭngjŏngwŏn) building. That department was responsible for receiving and issuing royal edicts. Its buildings are presumed to have been demolished around 1910 to 1915. It is set to be restored between 2023 and 2034.
- Bincheong (빈청; 賓廳; Pinch'ŏng) was a conference space for high-ranking officials. It was rebuilt during the reign of Gojong, but likely demolished around 1910 to 1915. It is set to be restored some time between 2023 and 2034.
- Kŏmsŏch'ŏng (검서청; 檢書廳) was a suborganization of the Kyujanggak (royal library). It main duties were to assist the Kyujanggak and transcribe documents. It had two buildings that were likely demolished around 1910 to 1915. It is set to be restored some time around 2023 and 2034.
- A branch office for the Sumunjang that guarded Yeongchumun. It was likely demolished in 1926, along with Yeongchumun. It is set to be restored around 2035 to 2041.
- Naesabok (내사복; 內司僕), later called T'aeboksa (태복사; 太僕司), was a government office in charge of the royal horses and carriages. Its buildings are presumed to have been destroyed around 1910 to 1915.

=== Pinjŏn and honjŏn areas ===
Mungyeongjeon (문경전; 文慶殿; Mun'gyŏngjŏn) was a building used to store spirit tablets. It first appeared in Gojong's reconstruction of the palace. The first time it was used was in 1890, for the funeral of Queen Sinjeong. In 1904, it was moved to Deoksugung for the funeral of Empress Sunmyeonghyo. It was again moved in 1921, to Changdeokgung. It is set to be restored around 2035 to 2041.

Hoeanjeon (회안전; 會安殿; Hoeanjŏn) was functionally a secondary facility for Mungyeongjeon. In 1904, it was moved to Deoksugung for the funeral of Empress Sunmyeonghyo. It is set to be restored around 2035 to 2041.

=== Naejo ===
- Injidang (인지당; 麟趾堂)
  - Building located originally to the east of Gyotaejeon. Built during Sejong's reign. After being destroyed in 1592, it was rebuilt during Gojong's reign. It was destroyed in the 1876 fire and rebuilt in 1888. However, another record from that year does not mention the building, so it has been theorized that the building was demolished soon after its reconstruction. A 1907 record had the building as absent.
- Jamidang (자미당; 紫薇堂; Chamidang)
  - Building located originally to the east of Injidang. Built during Sejong's reign. Was destroyed in the 1553 fire, rebuilt, then destroyed in 1592. It was rebuilt during Gojong's reign and destroyed in the 1876 fire. Like Injidang, it was reconstructed in 1888 but is not mentioned in another record, so it is presumed the building was demolished soon after it was reconstructed. It is also missing in the 1907 record.
- Tonghwadang (통화당; 通和堂; T'onghwadang)
  - It is set to be restored around 2030 to 2038.
- Mangyeongjeon (만경전; 萬慶殿; Man'gyŏngjŏn)
  - Mangyeongjeon was a building used by the queen dowager as her sleeping quarters. It was built in 1867 or 1868. After the 1876 fire, it was temporarily used as the king's sleeping quarters. In 1887, it was the site of Queen Sinjeong's 80th birthday celebration. In 1917, it was disassembled and its materials used to restore Changdeokgung after that palace's fire. Its annex building, Jesuhap, still remains. It is set to be restored around 2030 to 2038.
- Manhwadang (만화당; 萬和堂)
  - It was disassembled and moved to Deoksugung.It is set to be restored around 2030 to 2038.

=== Seonwonjeon ===
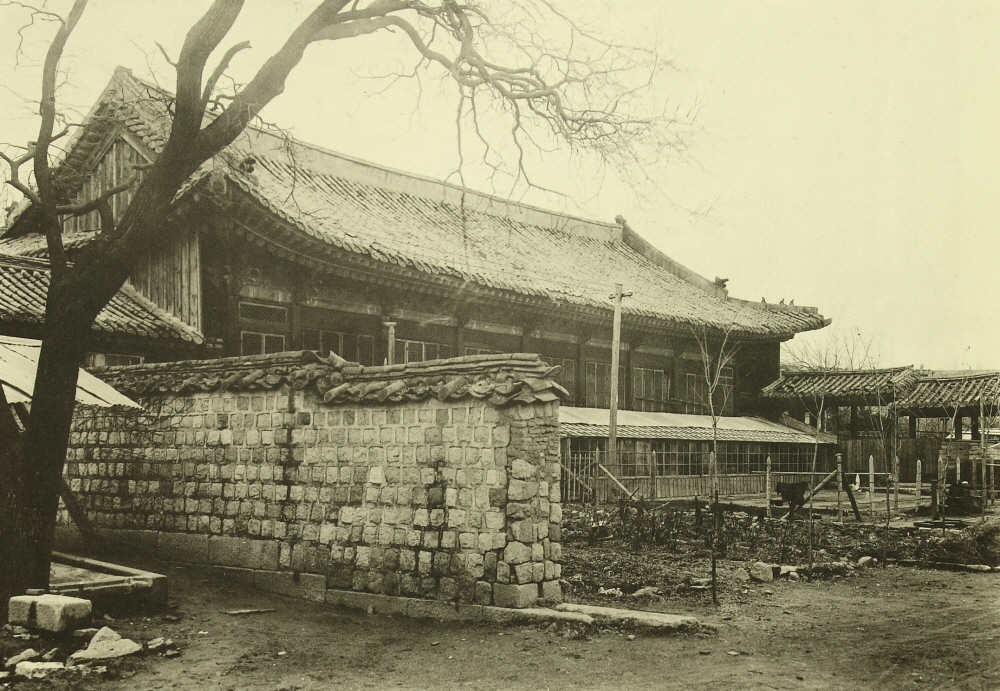
Photo of Seonwonjeon (published 1930)

Seonwonjeon (선원전; 璿源殿; Sŏnwŏnjŏn) was a building in the northeast of the palace used to ritually hold the portraits of former kings and queens. It was originally built in 1430, outside of the palace. It was moved into the palace, to the northeast of Munsojeon, on the 29th day, 3rd month of 1438. The move was complete by the 19th day, 5th month of that year. In 1444, Sejong had portraits of himself and the queen painted and stored in the building. All extant royal portraits began to be stored in the building beginning in 1469. The building was destroyed in 1592. Thereafter, portraits were stored elsewhere. The building was recreated during the Gojong era. Gojong moved palaces several times during his reign, and the royal portraits followed him wherever he went. A room was added to it in 1900. Around 1915, a temporary building for the colonial government was built in its vicinity. It and several related buildings were demolished in October 1932 when it was sold to the Buddhist temple Pakmunsa.

In 1967, its former site became occupied by the National General Museum of Korea. That museum became the National Folk Museum of Korea. The museum's building is set to be demolished in 2026, so that Seonwonjeon can be restored.

The following buildings are set to be restored between 2030 and 2038:

- Naejaesil (내재실; 內齋室) was a building where priests in charge of ancestral rites (제관; chegwan) stayed. It was reconstructed along with the Seonwonjeon during the Gojong era. It was likely demolished in 1932 during the Pakmunsa sale.
- Jinseolcheong (진설청; 陳設廳; Chinsŏlch'ŏng) was a small building used for jesa (ancestral rites) were prepared. It was built by Gojong but likely demolished in 1392 during the Pakmunsa sale.
- Gyeongandang (경안당; 敬安堂; Kyŏngandang) was a building used to temporarily store royal portraits. It was built during the Gojong era. It persisted after the 1945 liberation until it was demolished in 1966 to make way for the National General Museum of Korea.
- Sukgyeongjae (숙경재; 肅敬齋; Sukkyŏngjae) was a building meant for royal women. It was built by Gojong and likely demolished in 1932 during the Pakmunsa sale.It is set to be restored around 2030 to 2038.

=== Geoncheonggung ===
- Yeonghundang was a building in Geoncheonggung. To its north was an electric power facility that was involved in powering the earliest electric lights in Korea. It was demolished and recycled for Changdeokgung after the 1917 fire in that palace. It is set to be restored by 2027.

=== Owi and Sangŭiwŏn ===
- The headquarters of the Owi. The organization had waned in importance after the Imjin War, and was finally dissolved in 1883. (Note: The source makes a typo; it gives the dissolution date as 1232 (19th year of Gojong's reign), but this was before the organization was founded. It is confusing Gojong of Goryeo (r. 1213–1259) with Gojong of Korea (r. 1864–1907).) Its facilities were demolished in 1915 and its former site was turned into a park. It is set to be restored around 2039 to 2045.
- Headquarters of the Sangŭiwŏn, where the royal attire and treasures were managed. Its facilities were demolished in 1915 and its former site was turned into a park.

== Former landmarks ==
A building belonging to the government office Kyunyŏkch'ŏng was demolished in the 6th month of 1867 and recycled to build the kitchens (수라간; 水刺間).

Ganuidae (간의대; 簡儀臺; Kanŭidae) was an astronomical observatory in the northwest corner of the palace. It was built in 1433, under Sejong.

Yeoneunjeon (연은전; 延恩殿; Yŏnŭnjŏn) was an ancestor worship shrine where spirit tablets were kept. It was located on what is now the site of Taewonjeon. It was destroyed in 1592 and not rebuilt.

Borugak (보루각; 報漏閣; Porugak) was a pavilion where the Borugak Jagyeongnu was stored. It was built in the 8th month of 1434.

Sangnimwon (상림원; 上林苑; Sangnimwŏn) was a garden in the rear of the palace, where birds and flowers were kept.

After the 1917 Changdeokgung fire, Eungsadang was disassembled and moved to Changdeokgung.

Seunghwadang (승화당; 承華堂; Sŭnghwadang) was a building in the Jaseondang area. It was likely built in 1441 and was used by the crown prince. The building was demolished in 1543 in order to prevent a fire from spreading.

=== Geoncheonggung ===
Gwanmungak (관문각; 觀文閣; Kwanmun'gak) was part of Geoncheonggung. It was initially named Gwanmundang (관문당; 觀文堂; Kwanmundang). The building received its final name in 1875. It was used to store portraits and books. Beginning in the 1st month of 1888, the building went under construction for around three years. It was torn down and replaced with a Western-style building. The building had electrical appliances from the American Edison Electric Company. It also had a clocktower. The building was torn down around 1915.

=== Seonwonjeon ===
Munsojeon (문소전; 文昭殿; Munsojŏn) was a shrine used for ancestor worship. It was originally built in Changdeokgung for King Taejo and Queen Sinui. It was relocated to Gyeongbokgung during the reign of King Sejong. It was destroyed in 1592 and never rebuilt. In the late 18th century, King Yeongjo found the site of Munsojeon particularly special, and paid his respects to the spot.

=== Ch'imjŏn ===
- Yangsimdang (양심당; 養心堂)
  - A building to the northwest of Yangsimdang. It was destroyed in the 1553 fire and rebuilt. After being destroyed in 1592, it was not rebuilt in the Gojong-era reconstruction.

=== Rear gardens (pre-Imjin War) ===
Before the Imjin War, everything north of the garden Amisan was considered to be the rear gardens (후원; huwon; huwŏn) of the palace.

==== Landmarks ====
- Seohyeonjeong (서현정; 序賢亭; Sŏhyŏnjŏng) was a pavilion used for archery.
- Chwirojeong (취로정; 翠露亭; Ch'wirojŏng) was a pavilion that was built in 1456.
- Chungsundang (충순당; 忠順堂; Ch'ungsundang) was a temporary residence for the king.
- Hwawidang (화위당; 華韡堂; Hwawidang)

=== Gyeongmudae ===
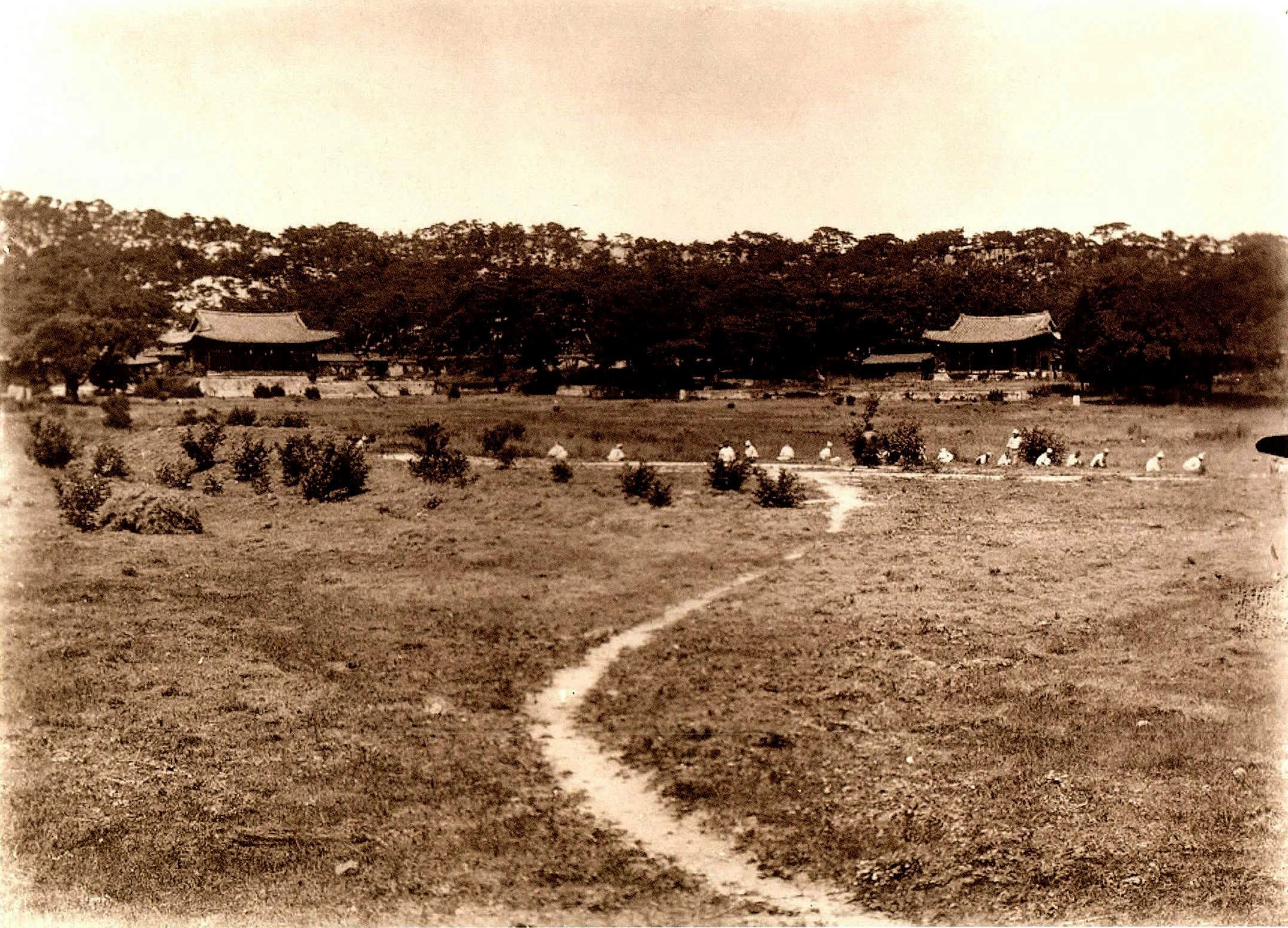
The rear gardens, with Yungmundang and Yungmudang visible (1920s)

During the Gojong-era reconstructions, the rear gardens occupied an area called "Gyeongmudae" (경무대; 景武臺; Kyŏngmudae). This area is largely no longer a part of the palace; much of this area is today the property of the Blue House. Gyeongmudae was created with the intent to create a space like the Secret Garden of Changdeokgung and Changgyeonggung. The area was named and the first stages of construction were completed in 1868. A wall was constructed around this garden. It had an area of 203,905 m^{2} (2,194,820 ft^{2}). From east to west it was 448.4 m (1,471 ft) long, and from north to south it was 543.8 m (1,784 ft) long. It had at least 32 multi-room buildings. The area was dismantled by 1939, during the colonial period. In 1961, the area was renamed to "Cheongwadae" (Korean name for the Blue House).

==== Yungmudang and Yungmundang ====
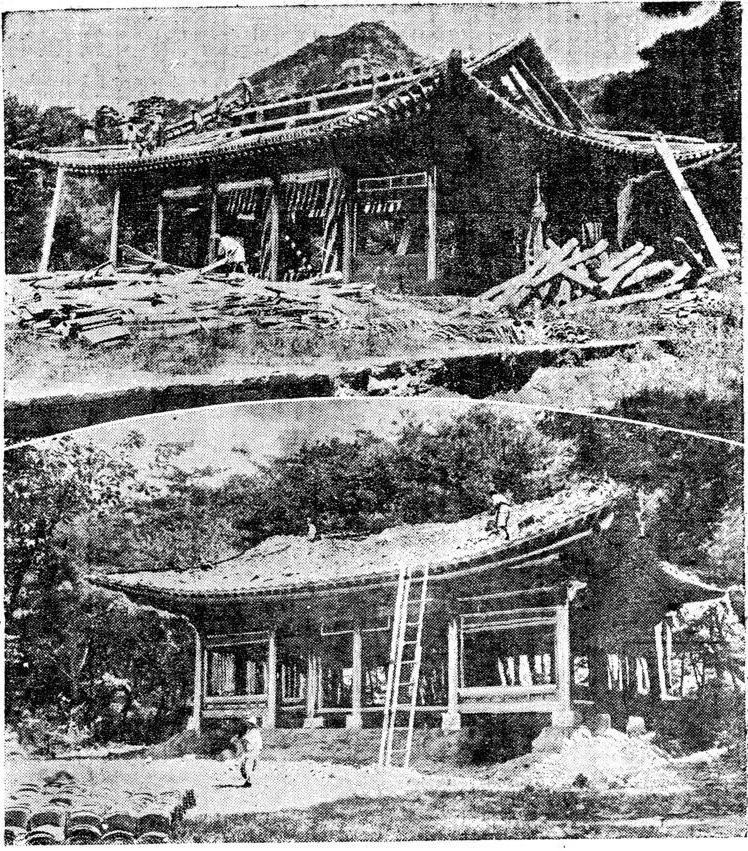
Yungmundang and Yungmudang being demolished (1928)

Yungmudang (융무당; 隆武堂) and Yungmundang (융문당; 隆文堂) are two halls that used to be in the rear gardens but are now in Yeonggwang County, South Jeolla Province. Yungmudang is a hall that was used for archery and martial arts training. Yungmundang is a hall that was used for civil service examinations and military examinations. Yungmundang was completed in the 10th month and Yungmudang the 9th month of 1868. In May 1929, both were dismantled and given, free of charge, to a Japanese Buddhist temple in Seoul called Ryūkoji (龍光寺; 용광사; Yonggwangsa). Their former location was used as part of the 1929 Chōsen Exhibition. Afterwards, the Governor-General of Chōsen residence began to be constructed at that spot. In 1946, they were acquired by a Won Buddhist organization. During the Korean War, Yungmundang was used to store the remains of soldiers. Afterwards, Yungmundang was used as a temple and Yungmudang as a residence. The Cultural Heritage Administration attempted to make the buildings Registered Cultural Heritages, but the Won Buddhist organization opposed this. The buildings were again moved in 2007 to Yeonggwang County.

==== Chunandang ====
Chunandang (춘안당; 春安堂; Ch'unandang) was a building to the west of Yungmudang and Yungmundang.

==== Governor-General of Chōsen residence ====
A residence for the Governor-General of Chōsen (경무대 총독 관저) was constructed in 1939.

==== Gyeongnongjae ====
Gyeongnongjae (경농재; 慶農齋; Kyŏngnongjae) was the name for a field used for ceremonially growing crops. The Five Grains were grown in the fields, and their performance was used to predict the performance of harvests throughout Korea. Around 2,021 m^{2} (21,750 ft^{2}) of the rear gardens was used for growing crops. It had a number of buildings associated with it. The area was significantly developed in the 1890s. It was completed in 1893. It is believed to have been gradually demolished until it was completely demolished when the Gyeongmudae Governor-General of Chōsen Residence was established in 1938.

=== Palace streams ===
The streams were largely removed during the colonial period. A 2007 paper claimed that only two somewhat original sections of the stream remained: one near Heungnyemun and one near Sinmumun. As part of the recent restoration projects, portions of the streams are being restored.

=== Government-General of Chōsen Building ===
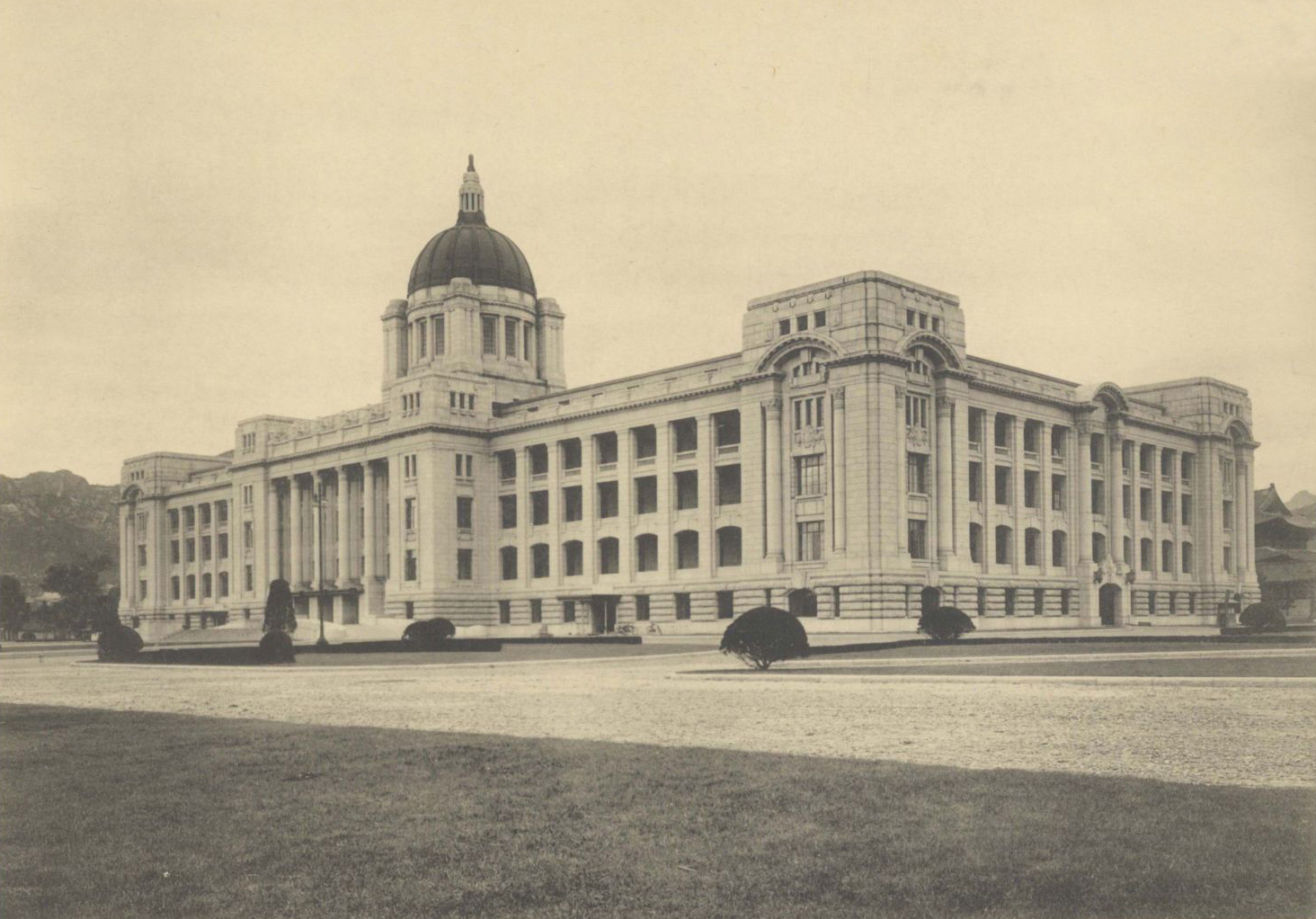
The building (1929)

It was designed from 1912 to 1914 by German architect Georg de Lalande (and by Nomura Ichirō after Lalande's death in 1914). Groundbreaking for the building was held on June 25, 1916, and it was completed October 1, 1926. At the time of its completion, it was the largest building in the Japanese Empire. It was 54 m (177 ft) tall and 128 m (420 ft) wide, and dwarfed the former main palace hall Geunjeongjeon behind it. After its completion, the tram line was extended to reach its front.

It was last used for a government meeting on May 19, 1983. It was then converted into a museum, which opened in 1986.

After the 1945 liberation of Korea, it was proposed a number of times that the building be demolished. According to the testimony of a US military officer, the first president of South Korea Syngman Rhee attempted to have the building demolished but was unable to because the government lacked the funds to do so. Calls for the building's demolition increased after the end of the Park regime. There was heavy public debate over the demolition. Proponents argued that it was a constant reminder of Korea's humiliation and was hindering the restoration of the palace, while opponents criticized the expense of the project and argued that the building was a piece of history and that it had become used by Koreans for longer than it had been by the Japanese. Ultimately, President Kim Young-sam ordered its demolition on August 8, 1993. On August 15, 1995, the fiftieth anniversary of the liberation of Korea, the dome of the building was removed by a crane, to the applause of around 50,000 onlookers. The demolition was completed by November 13, 1996. The dome and some ruins of the building were moved to the Independence Hall of Korea, where they are displayed in a symbolic exhibit.

The building had a number of annex buildings. One of them was originally built in place of the East Palace. Another was the Government-General Museum of Chōsen.

=== Government-General Museum of Chōsen ===
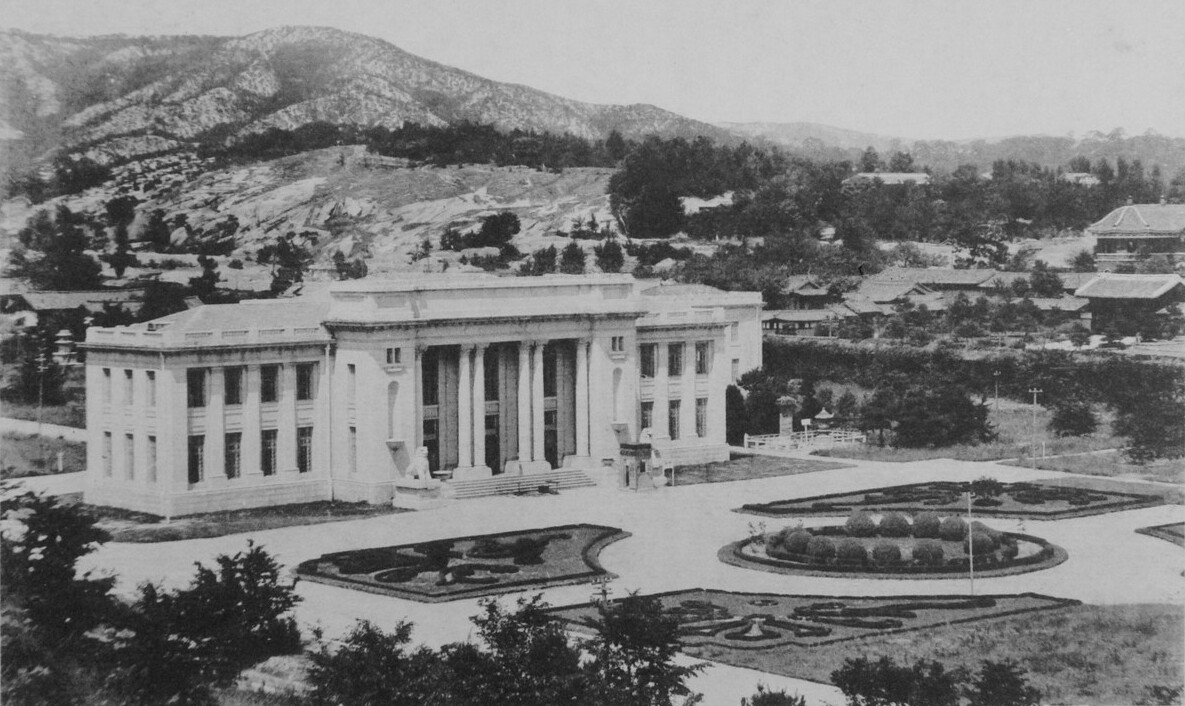
The museum during the colonial era

The Government-General Museum of Chōsen was a museum on the grounds of the palace. Construction on it began in September 1913 and concluded in September 1915. It was located on the former site of Geoncheonggung. After the building was used as part of the 1915 Chōsen Industrial Exhibition, the museum moved into the building and opened to the public on December 1 of that year. It had six exhibition halls and operated under the government-general's Bureau of Education.

After the 1945 liberation, the museum was seized by the United States Army Military Government in Korea and reorganized into the National Museum of Korea. The building was used by an art institution until 1987. From 1897 until 1995, it was used as a traditional crafts museum. It was demolished in 1998.

Its former annex building is currently the Gyeongbokgung Palace Management Office.

=== Government-General Art Museum of Chōsen ===
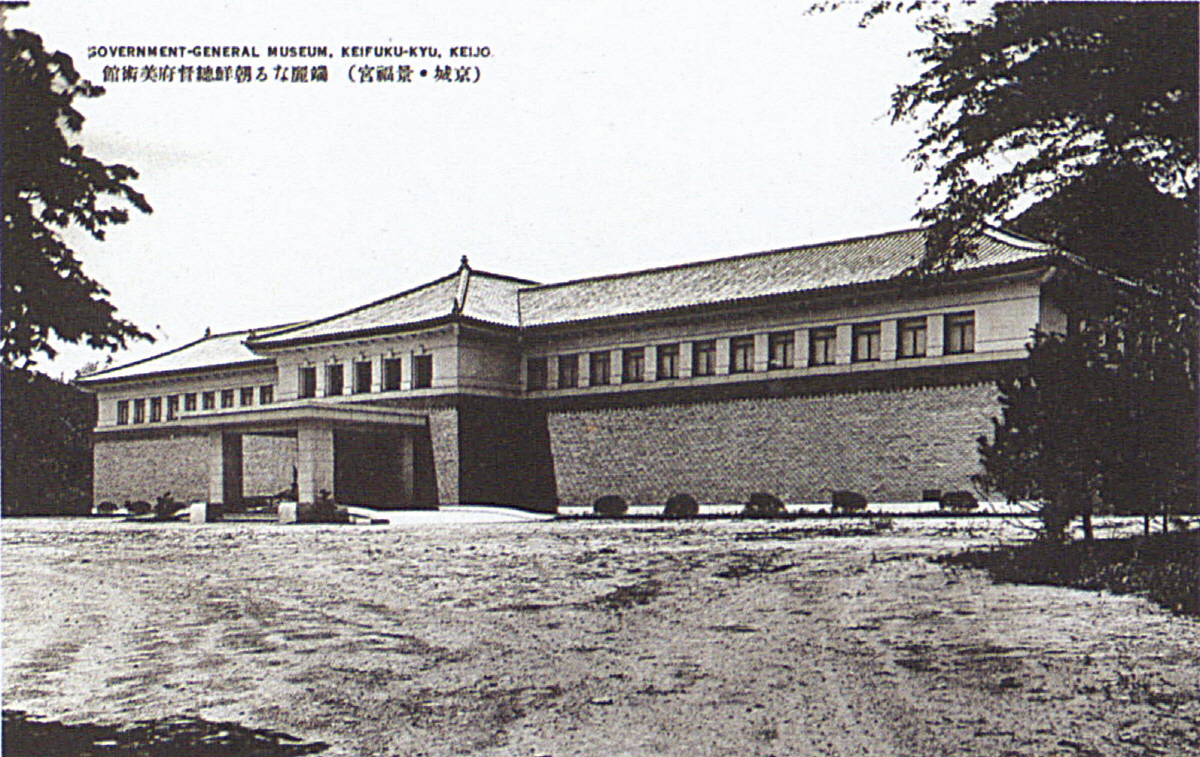
The art museum on a colonial-era postcard

The Government-General Art Museum of Chōsen was an art museum on the former site of Geoncheonggung. It was completed in 1939. Its building continued to be used after the 1945 liberation of Korea. The National Folk Museum of Korea used it until 1995, when it began to be used by the Korean Traditional Crafts Museum (한국전통공예전시관; 韓國傳統工藝展示館). It was demolished in 1998, and Geoncheonggung was rebuilt on its spot.
