= Seonwonjeon =

Seonwonjeon (Korean: 선원전; Hanja: 璿源殿; MR: Sŏnwŏnjŏn) refers to halls used for ancestor worship in Joseon-era Korean palaces.

- Seonwonjeon (Gyeongbokgung)
- Old Seonwonjeon (Changdeokgung)
- New Seonwonjeon (Changdeokgung)
- Seonwonjeon (Deoksugung)
