= Hahyangjeong =

Building in Gyeongbokgung, Seoul, South Korea

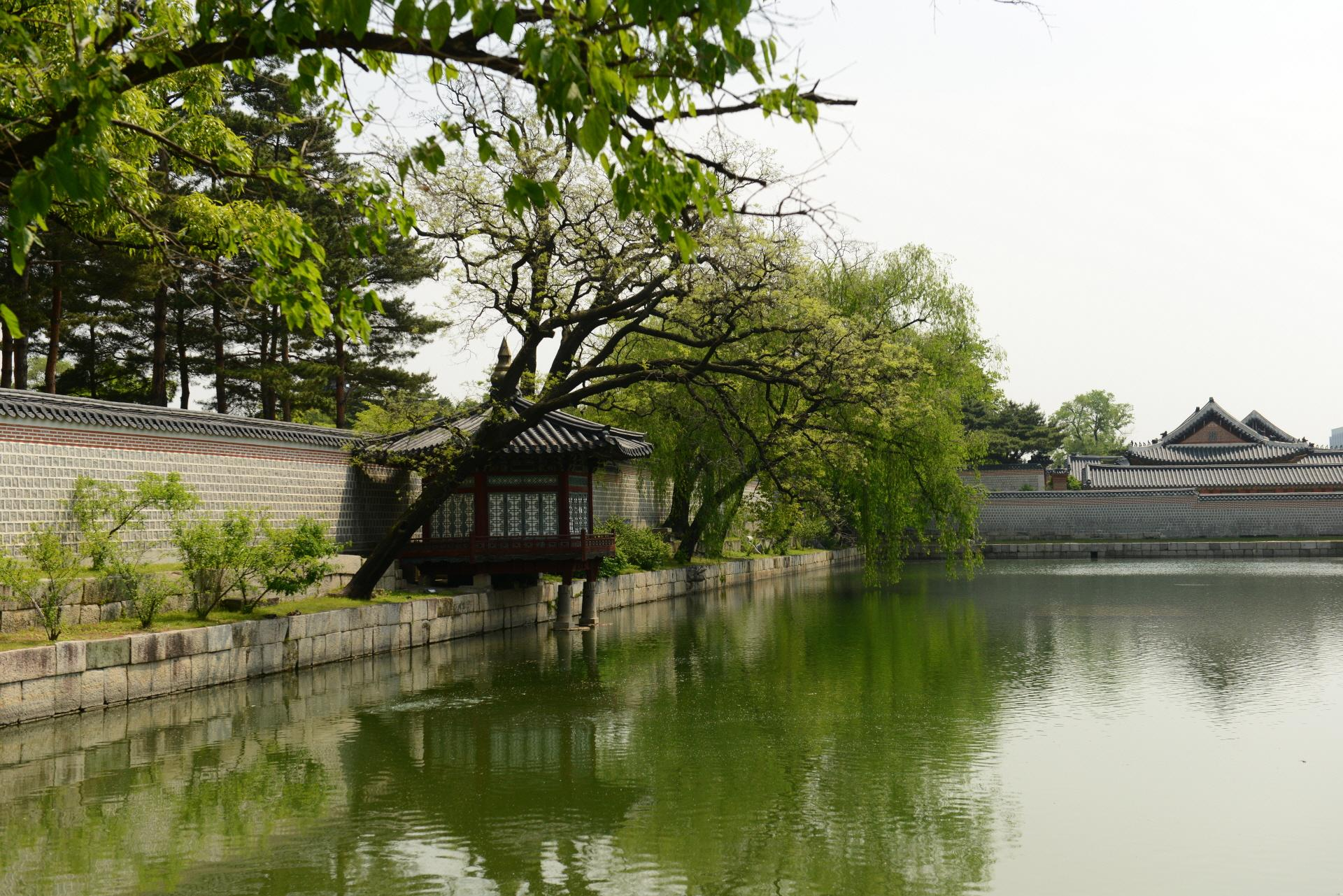
- Interactive map of the Hahyangjeong area

General information
- Location: Gyeongbokgung, Seoul, South Korea
- Coordinates: 37.580°N 126.975°E
- Completed: 1950

Korean name
- Hangul: 하향정
- Hanja: 荷香亭
- RR: Hahyangjeong
- MR: Hahyangjŏng

Hahyangjeong (Korean: 하향정; Hanja: 荷香亭) is a Joseon-style pavilion in the palace Gyeongbokgung in Seoul, South Korea. It is a modern addition to the palace. It was constructed in 1950 and is located to the northeast of Gyeonghoeru. It was constructed for the first South Korean president Syngman Rhee, who used it for fishing and leisure.

Whether to demolish the structure has been controversial. It was long uncertain if Rhee used it personally, but in 2013 it was announced that photos had been discovered of Rhee fishing at the spot. Proponents of the building's demolition argued that keeping it would go against the objectives of the ongoing plans to restore the palace to its pre-colonial state. Opponents argued that the building was itself historic because of its association with Rhee. The Cultural Heritage Administration decided to keep the building on November 13, 2013.

== See also ==
- List of landmarks in Gyeongbokgung
- History of Gyeongbokgung
