= Gyeonghoeru =

Hall in Gyeongbokgung, Seoul, South Korea

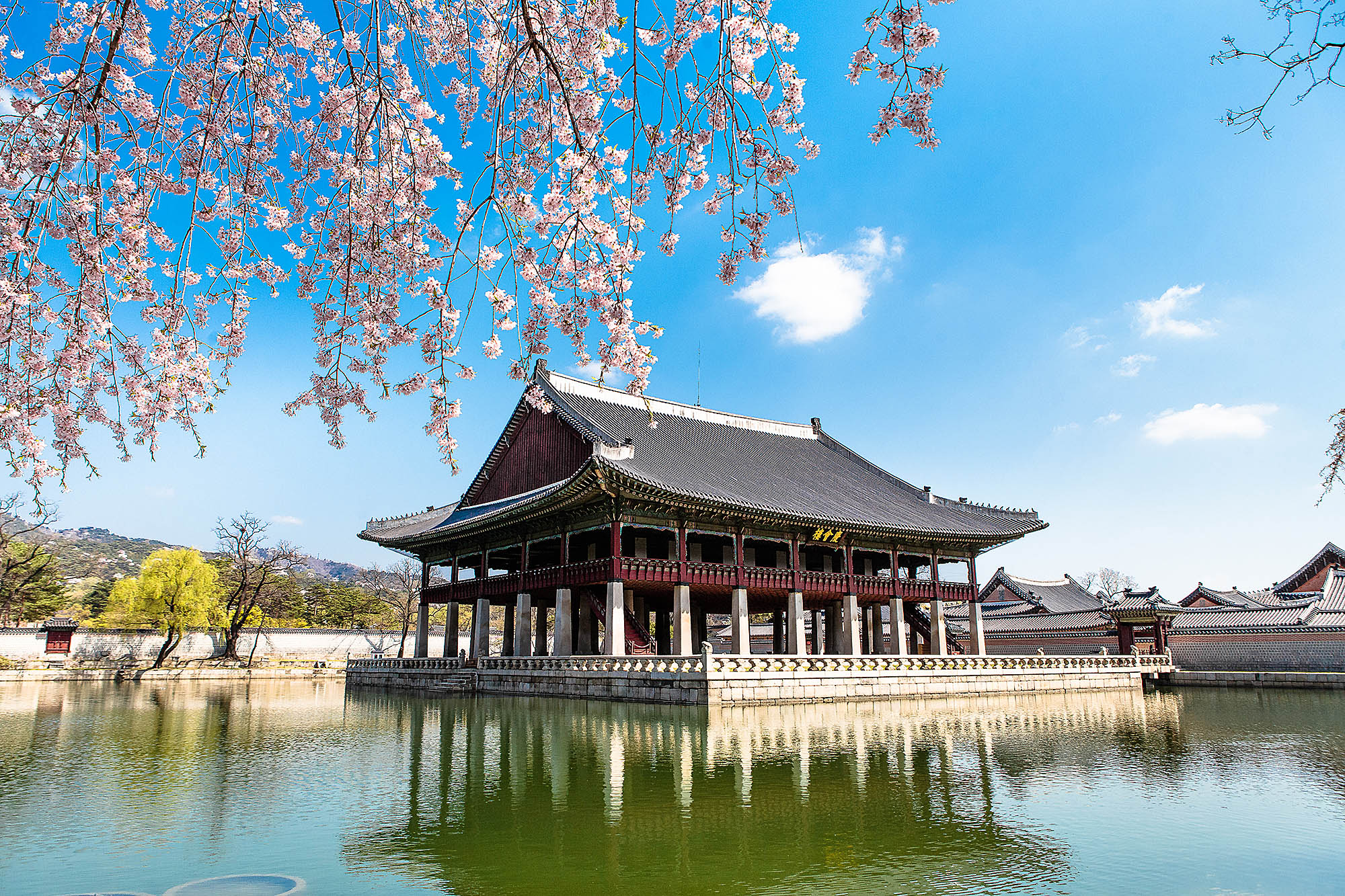
- The building (2016)
- Interactive map of Gyeonghoeru

General information
- Coordinates: 37°34′47.1″N 126°58′33.2″E
- Designations

National Treasure (South Korea)
- Official name: Gyeonghoeru Pavilion of Gyeongbokgung Palace
- Designated: 1985-01-08

Korean name
- Hangul: 경회루
- Hanja: 慶會樓
- Lit.: Virtuous Meeting Building
- RR: Gyeonghoeru
- MR: Kyŏnghoeru

Gyeonghoeru (Korean: 경회루; Hanja: 慶會樓; lit. Virtuous Meeting Building) is an elevated banquet hall in the palace Gyeongbokgung in Seoul, South Korea. It is a designated National Treasure.

== Description ==
The building is located on a small artificial island on the east side of a large artificial pond. The island is connected to the mainland by three bridges.

The building currently has 35 rooms. It is supported by 48 stone pillars on its first floor. Its second floor is divided into three levels of differing heights. The highest level in the center was meant for the king. The building's features symbolize a number of concepts in numerology: 3 symbolizes heaven, earth, and man, 8 the bagua, 12 the months of the year, 64 the hexagram, and 24 the solar terms. Two bronze dragon statues were placed in the adjacent pond, as symbolic wardens against fire. In 1997, only one was discovered in the pond. It is currently on display in the National Palace Museum. Two duplicates were constructed and placed back in the pond in February 1998.

== History ==
It was first completed in the 4th month of 1412. The original form was smaller than the current, although it had a two-story roof rather than the current single-story roof. It was renovated in 1429, 1474 or 1475, and in 1527. In 1477, a banquet was held here for an envoy from the Ryukyu Kingdom. In 1506, a hill called Mansesan (만세산) was built to the west of the lake. It was spared by the 1553 fire. It was destroyed in 1592 during the Imjin War; only its stone foundation pillars remained, of which several eventually broke.

It was rebuilt in 1867. During the residency-general period, the Japanese used the building for banquets, including a particularly large one for Japanese resident-general Itō Hirobumi. The rebuilt version had a wall surrounding the pond. The wall was torn down during the colonial period and rebuilt from 2004 to 2005. During the 1915 Chōsen Industrial Exhibition, visitors could freely enter and exit the building, which was surrounded by shops and food stalls. Various temporary buildings were constructed around the lake for the 1929 Chōsen Exhibition.

From 1983 to 2007, the South Korean 10,000 won note featured an image of Gyeonghoeru.

== Gallery ==
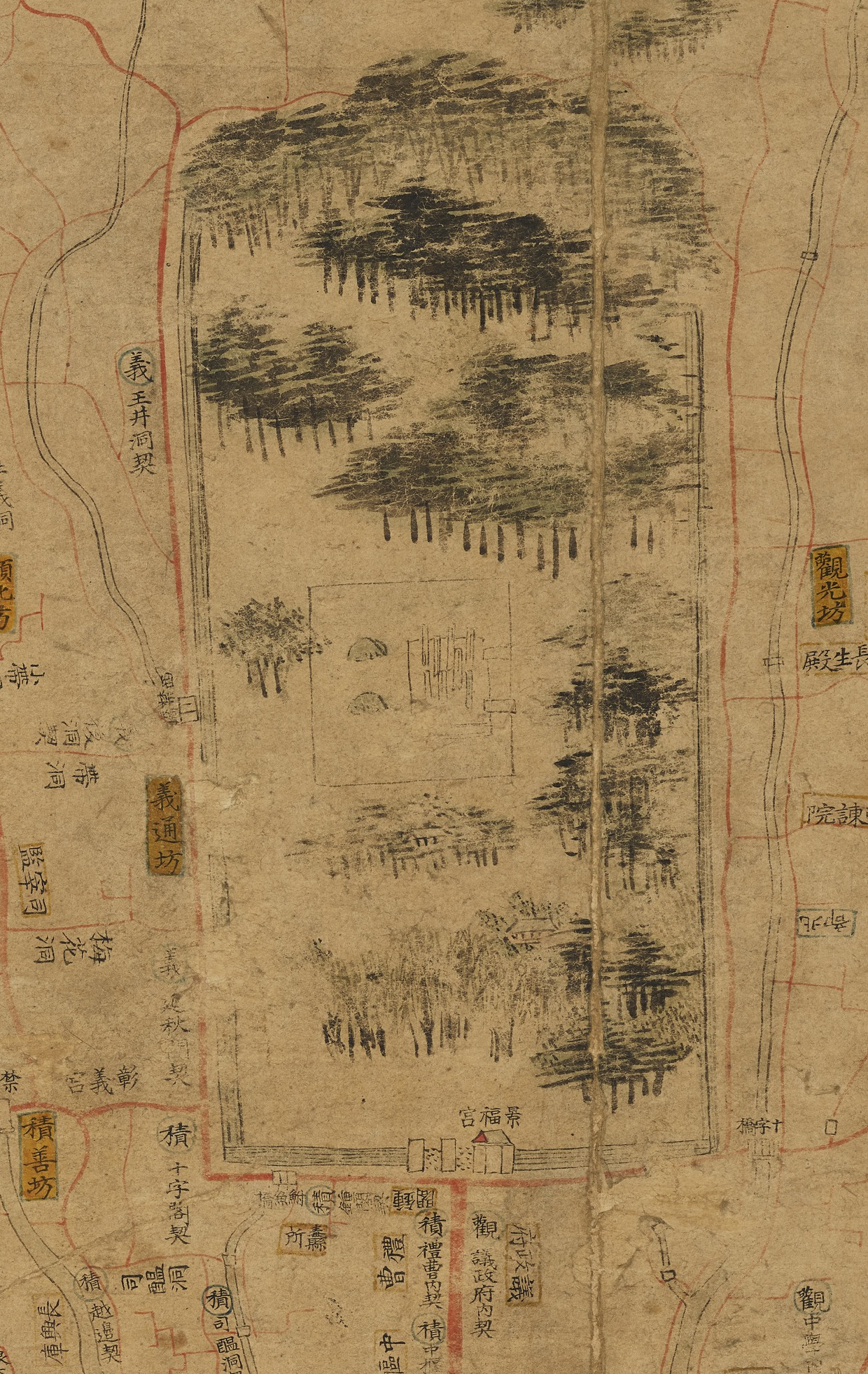
Map of the ruins of Gyeongbokgung during the 18th century; Gyeonghoeru's ruins can be seen in the square area

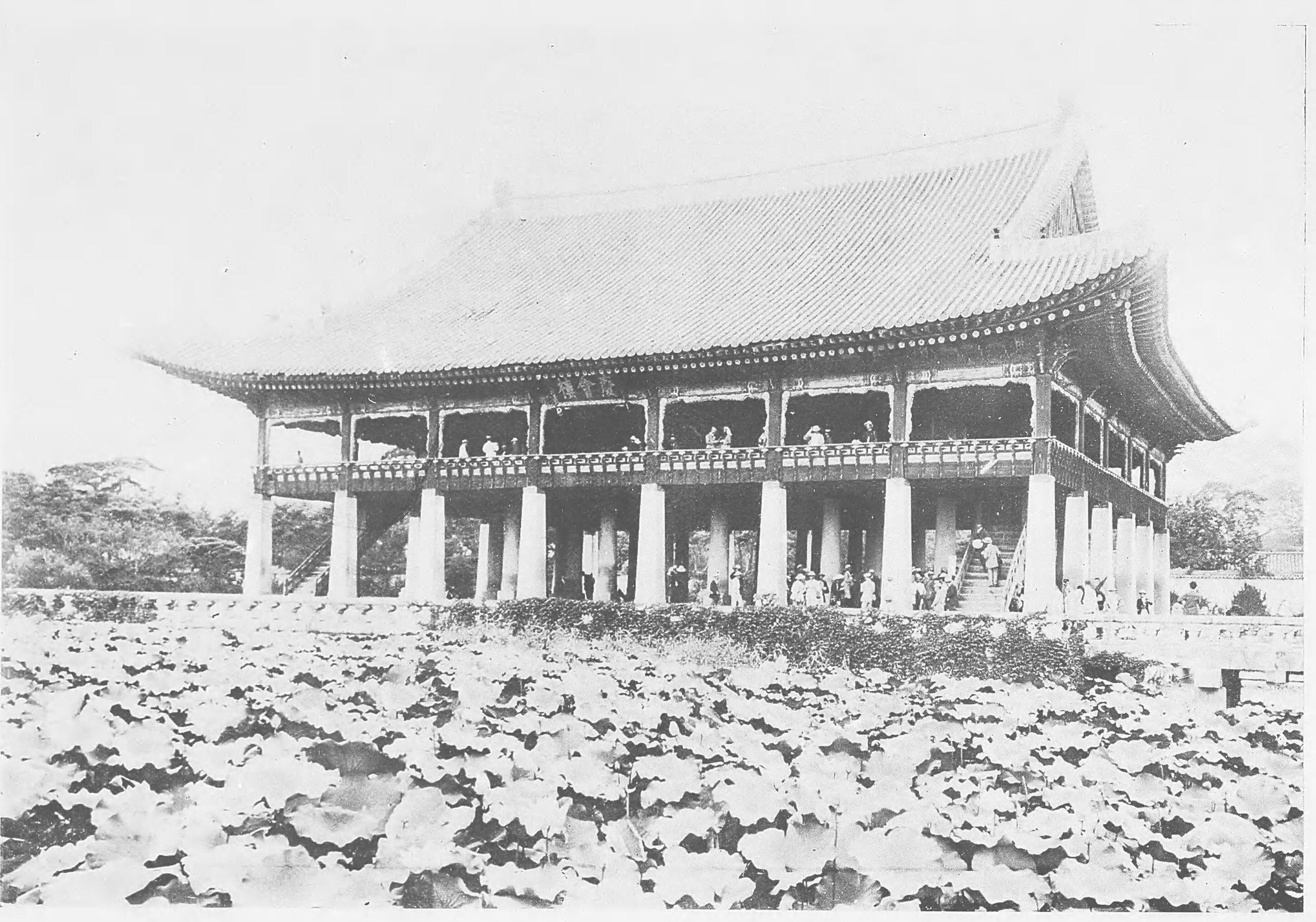
Gyeonghoeru (1906)

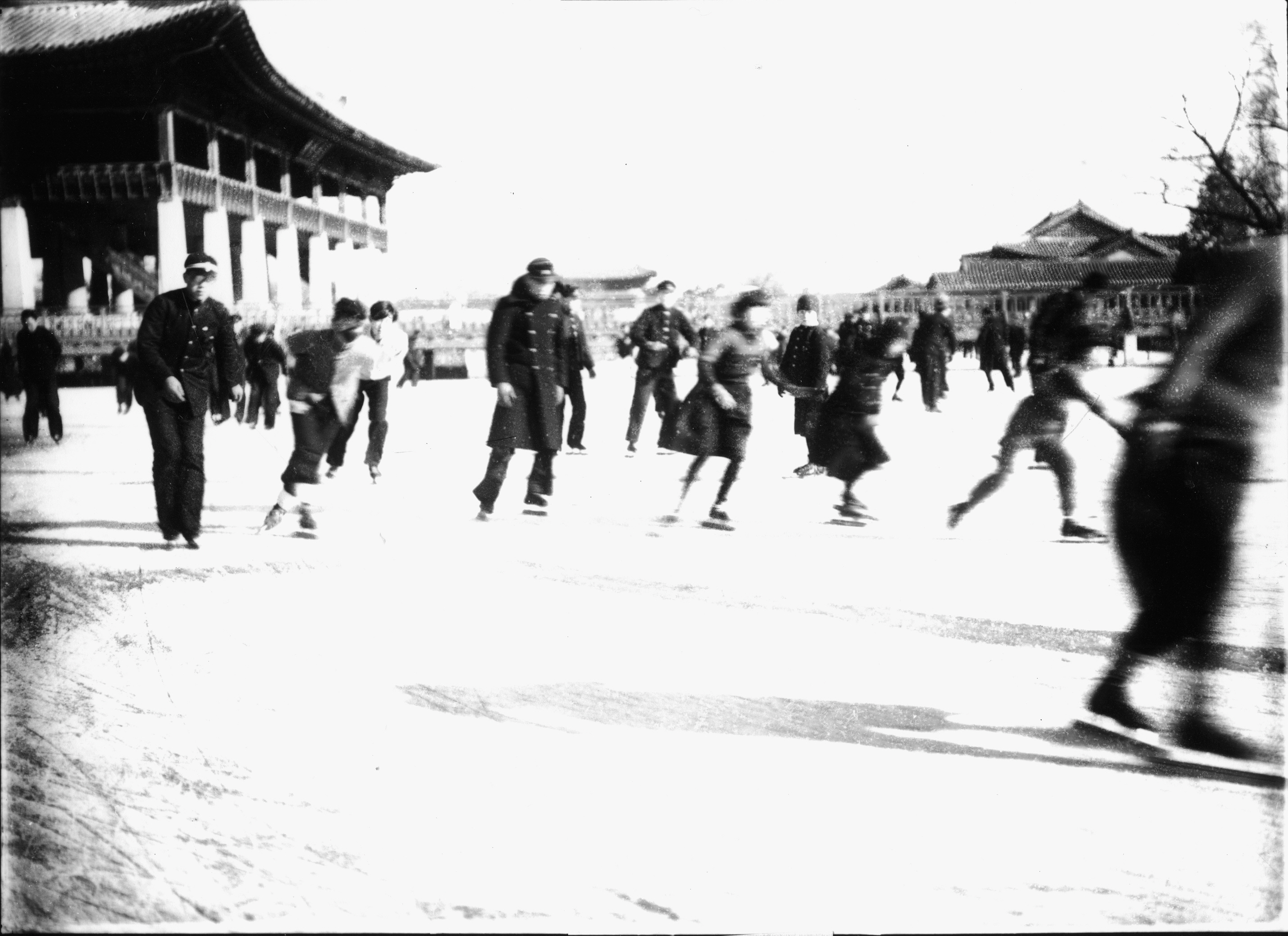
Skating at Gyeonghoeru during the colonial period

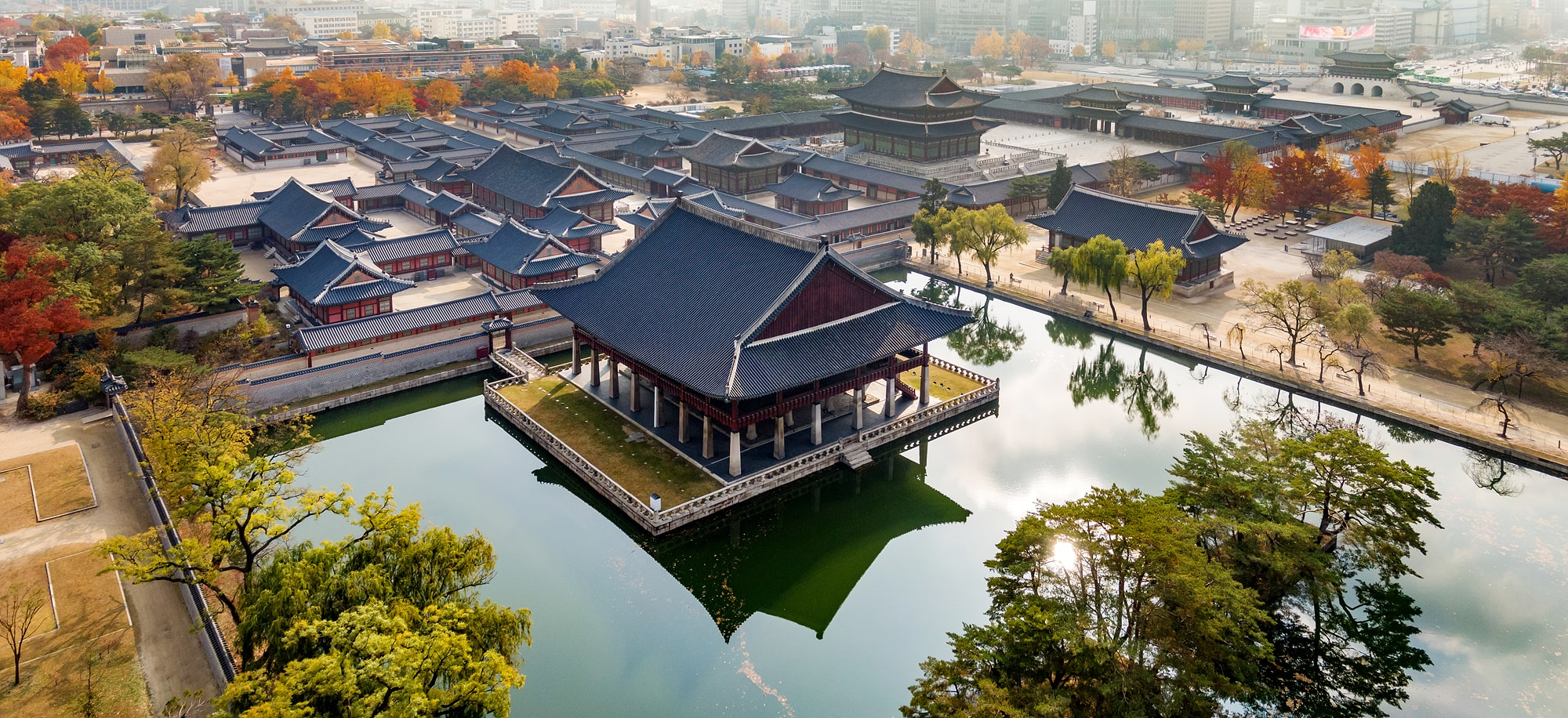
Aerial shot of the building from the northwest

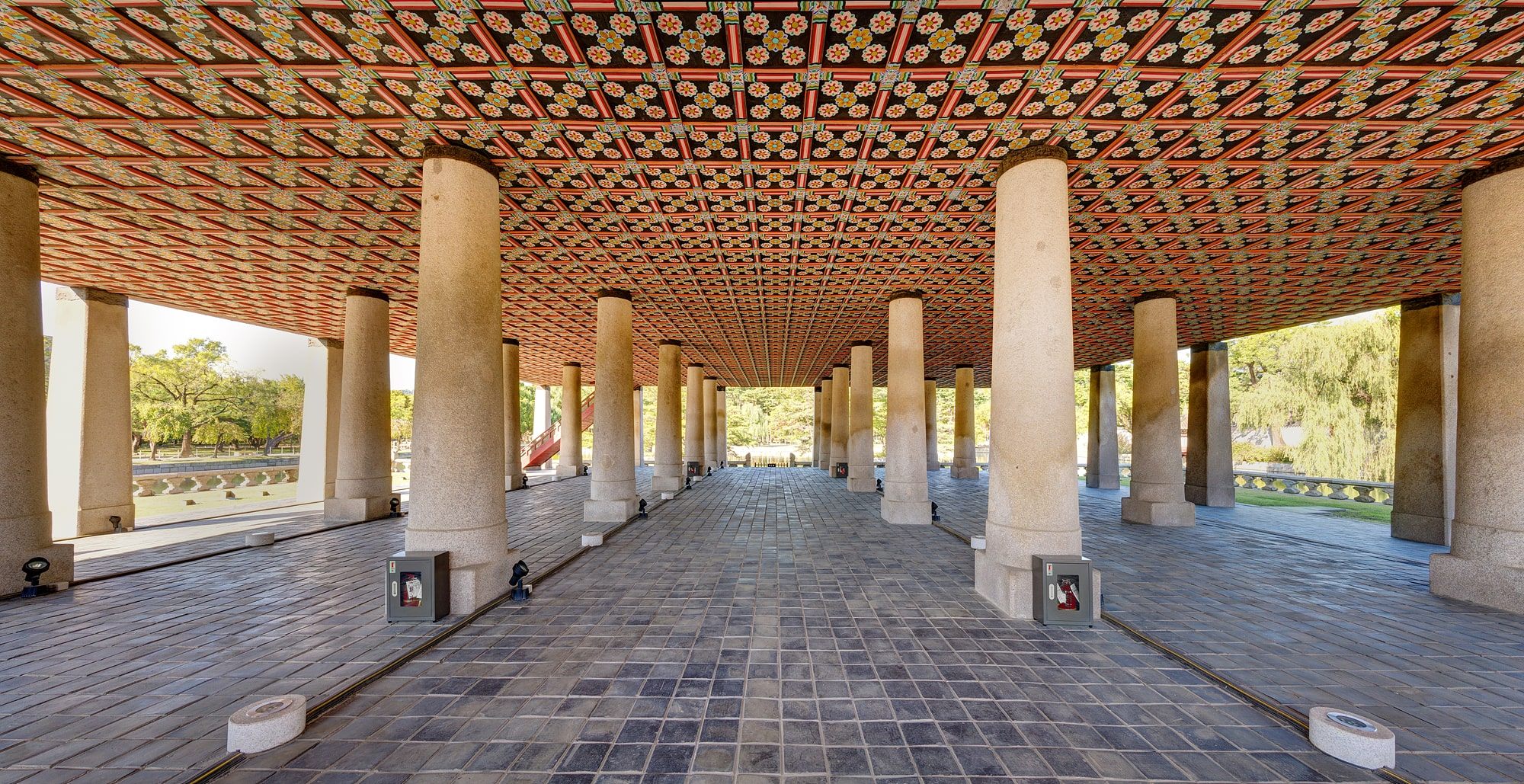
First floor

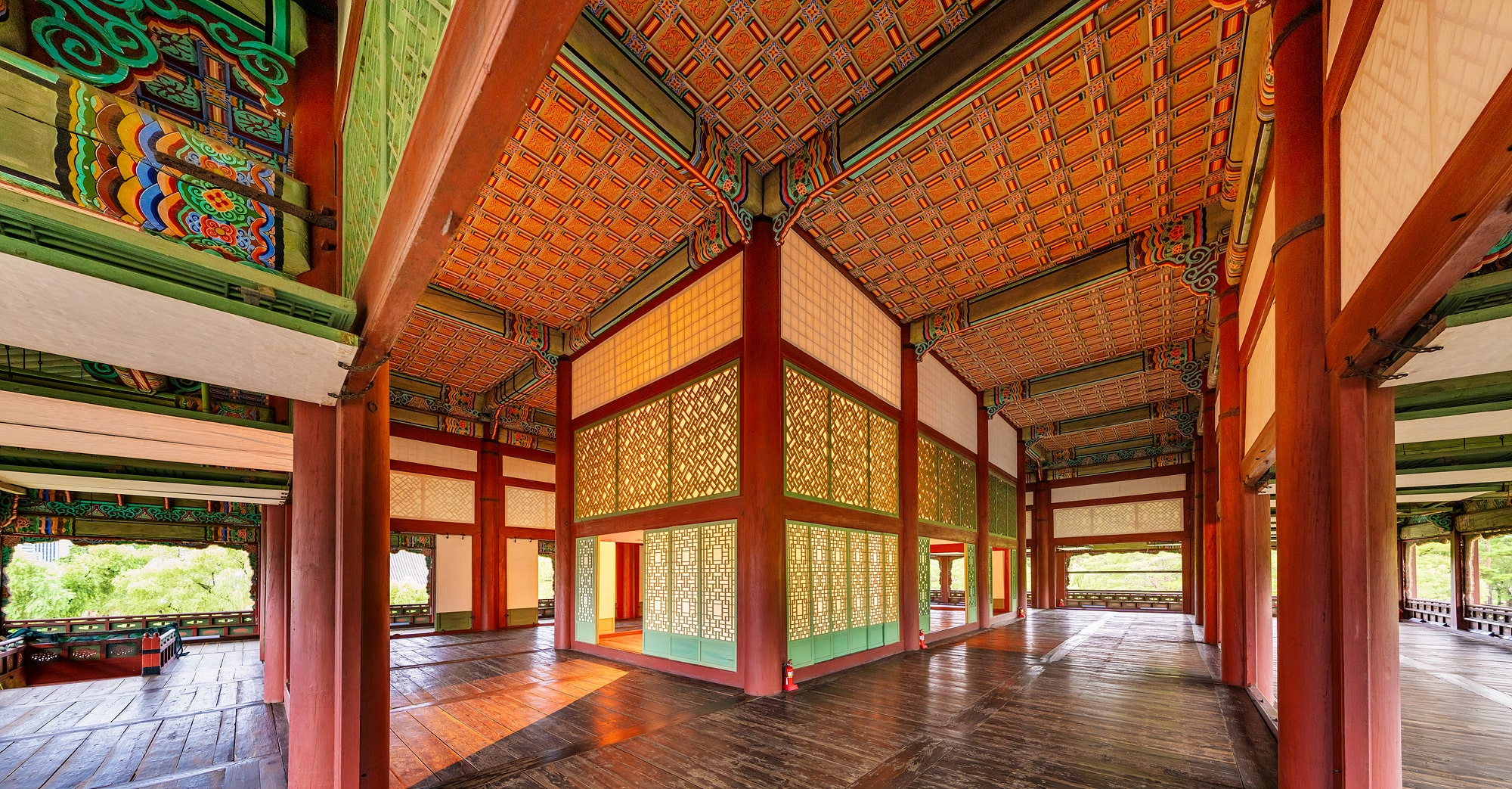
Second floor

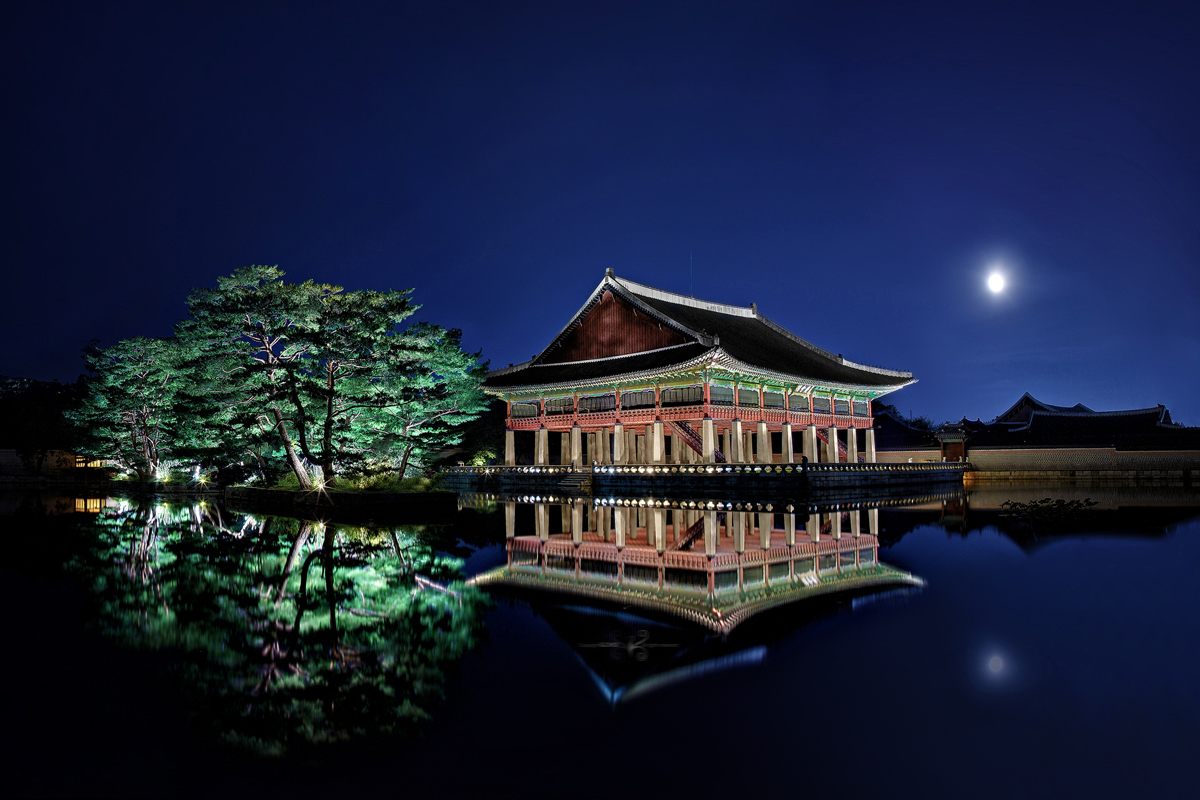
Gyeonghoeru at night (2012)

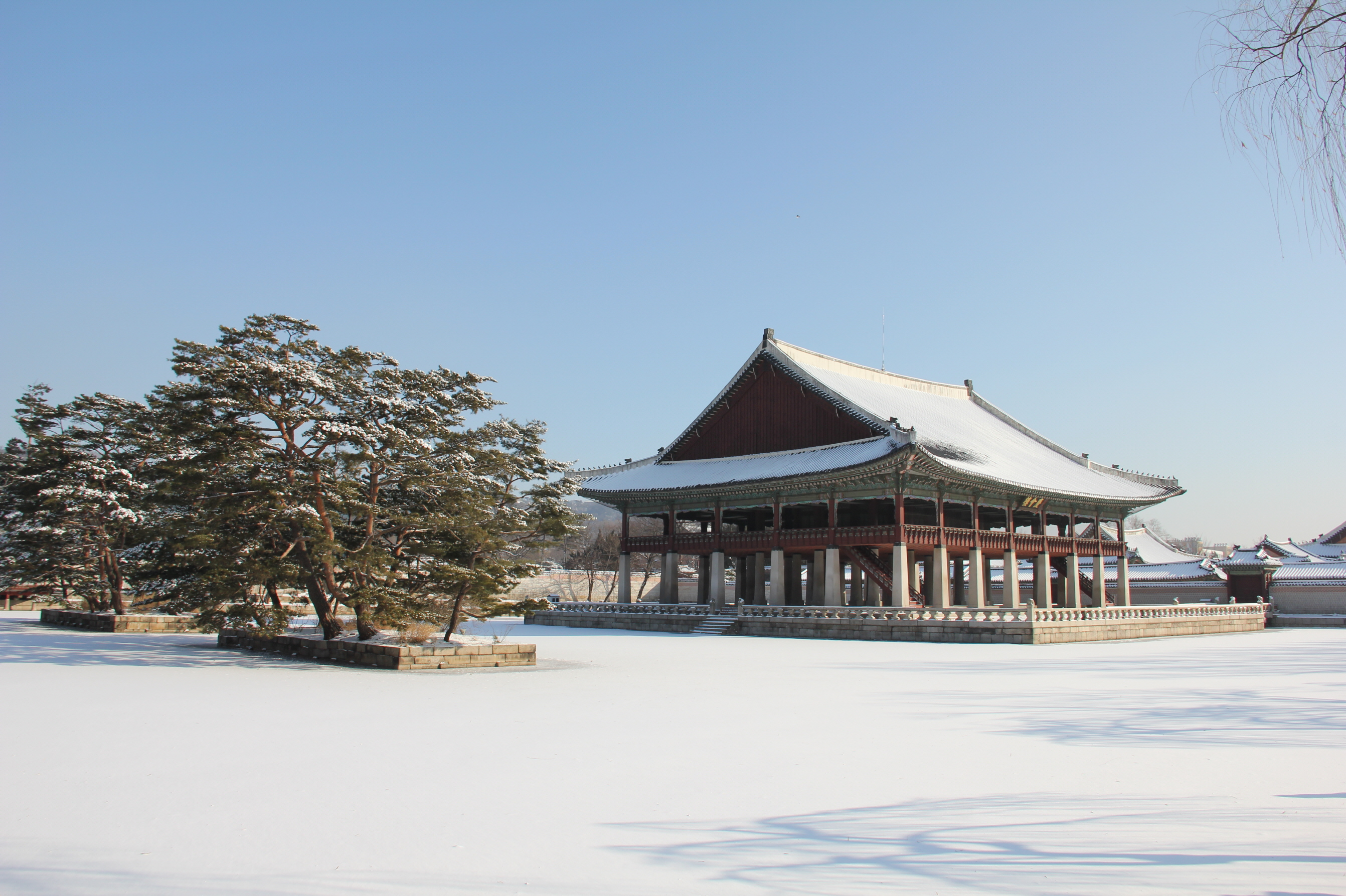
Gyeonghoeru (2012)

== See also ==
- List of landmarks in Gyeongbokgung
- History of Gyeongbokgung
