= Government-General Museum of Chōsen =

1915–1945 museum in Keijō, Korea

- 朝鮮総督府博物館
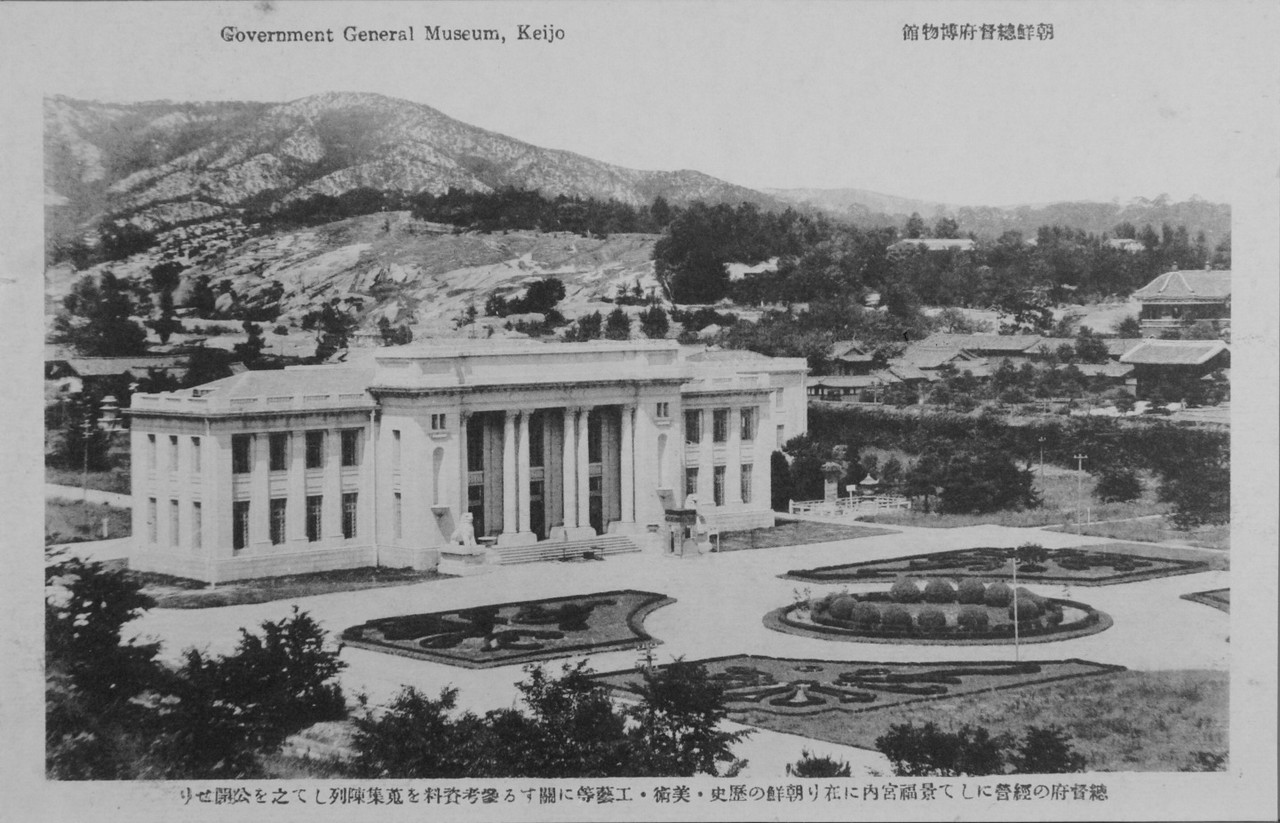
- Interactive map of the Government-General Museum of Chōsen area

General information
- Location: Keijō, Korea, Empire of Japan
- Coordinates: 37°34′43″N 126°58′42″E
- Opened: 1 December 1915

The Government-General Museum of Chōsen (Japanese: 朝鮮総督府博物館, Korean: 조선총독부박물관) was a museum in Keijō (Seoul), Korea, Empire of Japan.

== History ==
The Government-General Museum of Chōsen began as a temporary museum in the East Palace of the former royal palace Gyeongbokgung in 1909. In September 1915, in anticipation of the Chōsen Industrial Exhibition, for the 1915 Chōsen Industrial Exhibition, a permanent facility was constructed for the museum on the former site of Geoncheonggung. After the building was used for the exhibition, the museum moved into the building and opened to the public on December 1 of that year.

The museum established a Gyeongju branch in 1926 and a Buyeo County branch in 1939. Related museums (although not explicitly branches) were established in Kaesong in 1931, Pyongyang in 1933, and Gongju in 1940.

The museum did not operate as an independent agency, and the department under which it fell was subject to bureaucratic reorganization.

The museum and Japanese Korean studies research in general have been described as intentionally focused on Korea's ancient history, in order to portray Korea as old and Japan as modern. Only 4.5% of the museum's collection was from the Joseon period; 76% was from before that. It had six exhibition halls and operated under the government-general's Bureau of Education.

After the 1945 liberation, the museum was seized by the United States Army Military Government in Korea and reorganized into the National Museum of Korea. That museum opened on 3 December 1945. The Government-General Museum's former building was used by an art institution until 1987. From 1897 until 1995, it was used as a traditional crafts museum. In 1998, the museum building was demolished, after it had come to be viewed as a "symbol of colonialism".

== Statistics ==
# visitors per year by ethnicity
Year	Korean	Japanese	Foreign	Total
1921				57,337
1922			1,800	64,420
1923				39,004
1925	27,483	21,182	996	49,061
1926	32,471	25,648	2,006	60,125
1927	15,280	28,129	1,307	44,716
1928	18,859	30,308	1,221	50,338
1929	16,349	28,935	1,355	46,639
1930	9,304	25,787	1,513	36,604

== Publications ==
- Bulletin of the Government-General Museum of Chōsen (朝鮮總督府博物館報), 1926–
- Museum Exhibits Illustrated (博物館陳列品圖鑑), 1918–1943 (17 volumes)

== Gallery ==
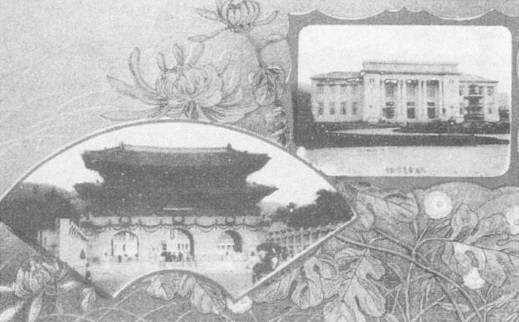
Postcard of the 1915 Chōsen Industrial Exhibition

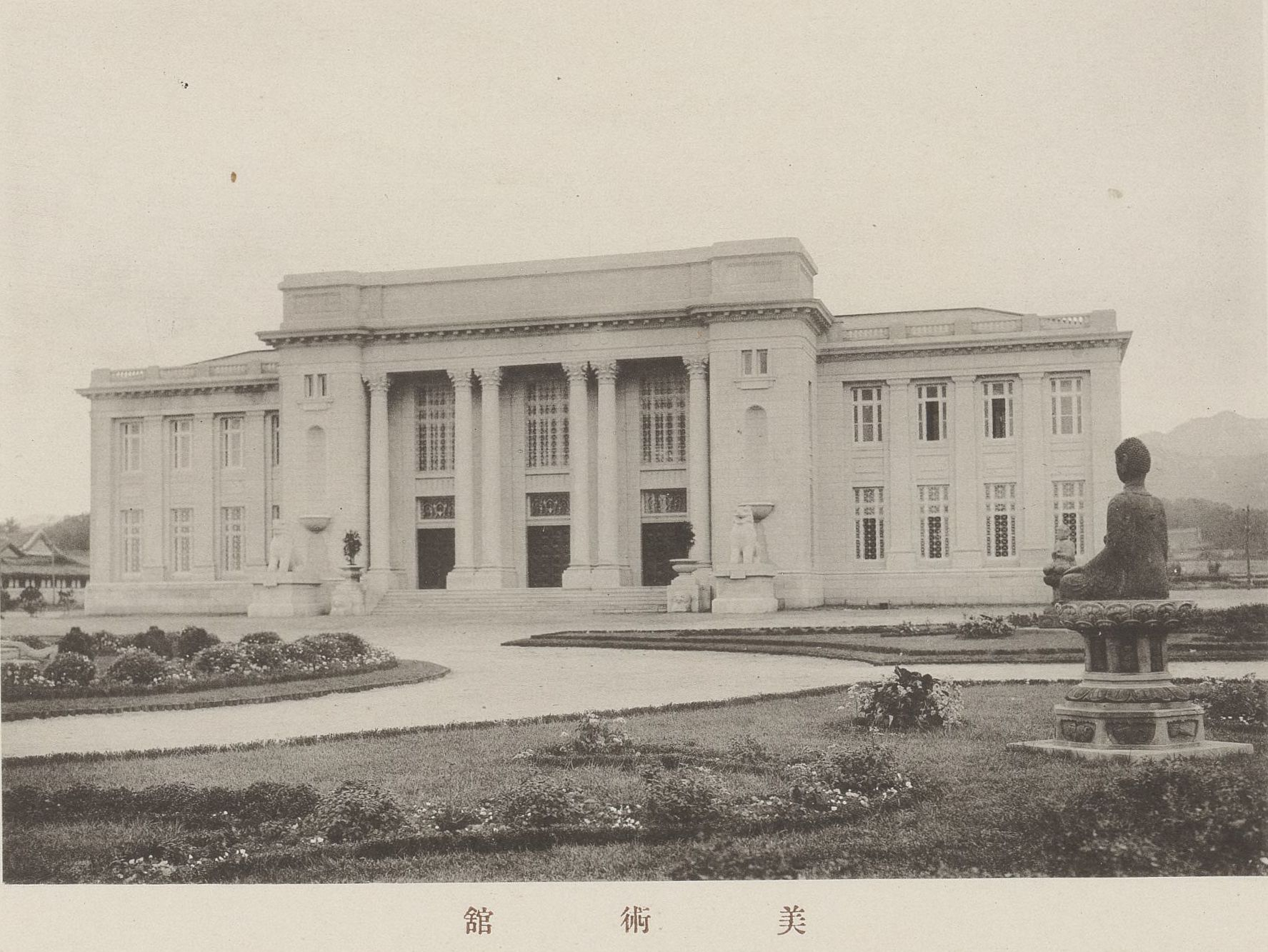
The museum building in 1915

== See also ==
- Karafuto Agency Museum
