= Yeongchumun =

West gate of Gyeongbokgung in South Korea

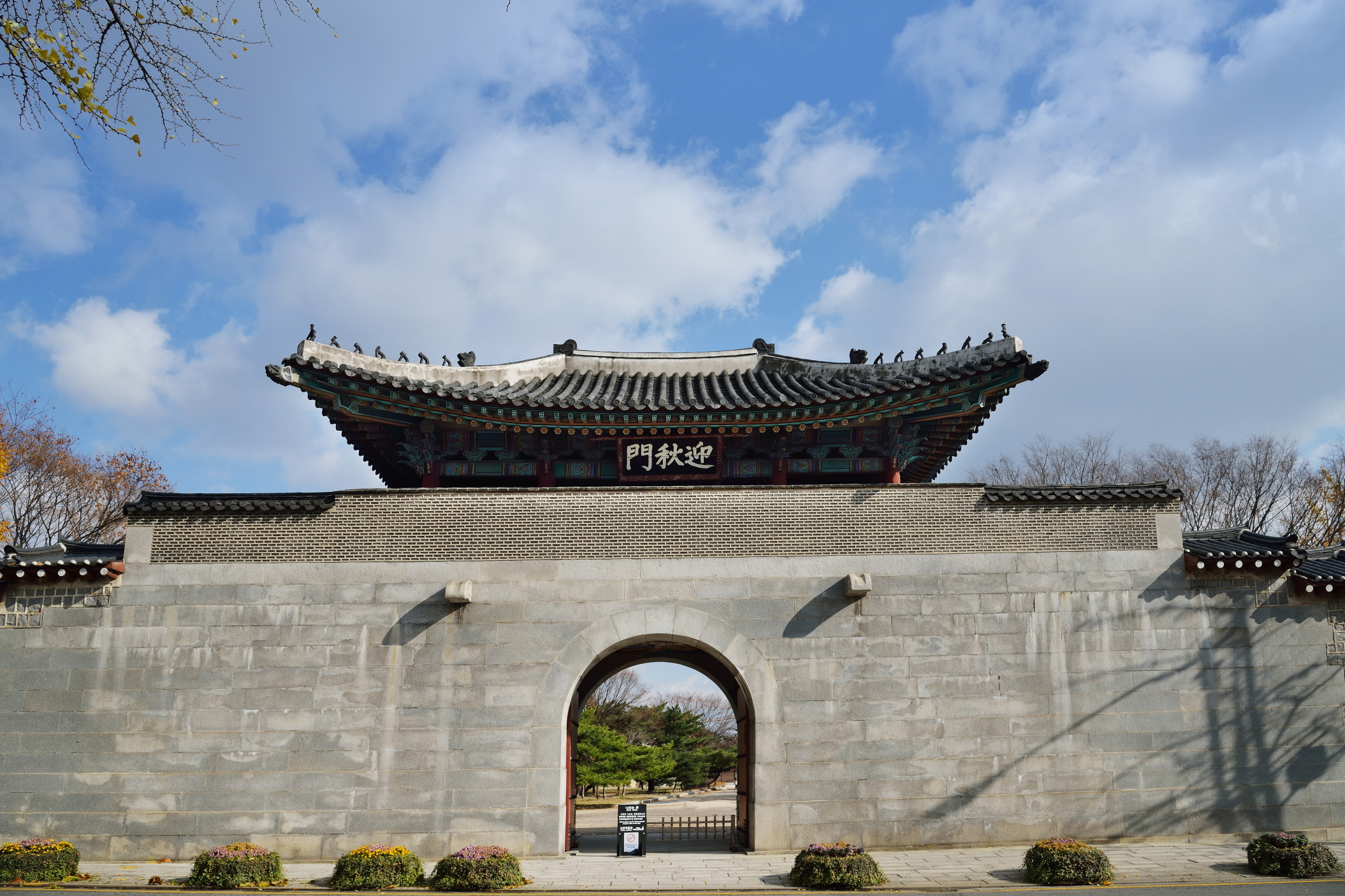
- The gate (2012)
- Interactive map of the Yeongchumun area

General information
- Location: Gyeongbokgung, Seoul, South Korea
- Coordinates: 37.578°N 126.974°E
- Completed: 1398

Korean name
- Hangul: 영추문
- Hanja: 迎秋門
- Lit.: Welcoming Autumn Gate
- RR: Yeongchumun
- MR: Yŏngch'umun

Yeongchumun (Korean: 영추문; Hanja: 迎秋門; lit. 'Welcoming Autumn Gate') is the west gate of the palace Gyeongbokgung in Seoul, South Korea. It was used by bureaucrats. It is mostly identical in form to the east gate Geonchunmun.

It was first built in 1398. It was named in 1426. It was destroyed in 1592 and rebuilt in 1865. It had a single-story gate tower. It collapsed on April 27, 1926, likely due to vibrations from tram construction. It was then destroyed. In 1975, it was restored, although around 45 m (148 ft) north of its original location and using reinforced concrete. It was then used by the Capital Defense Command of the South Korean military. In 2018, it became available for public use as a regular entrance to the palace.

It is set to be restored to its original location around 2023 to 2034.

== See also ==
- List of landmarks in Gyeongbokgung
- History of Gyeongbokgung
