= Sujeongjeon =

Hall in Gyeongbokgung, Seoul, South Korea

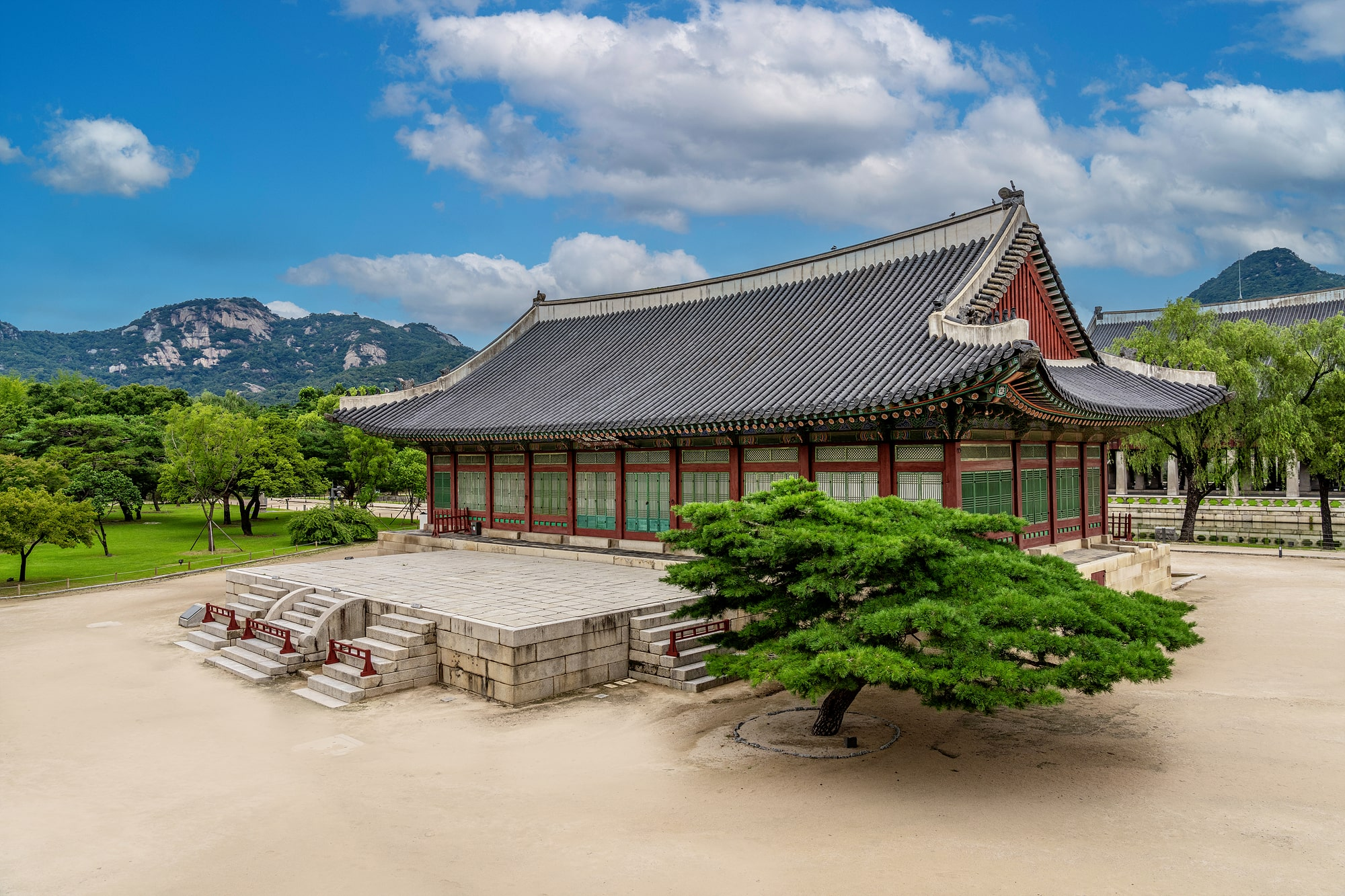
- The building
- Interactive map of Sujeongjeon

General information
- Location: Gyeongbokgung, Seoul, South Korea
- Coordinates: 37°34′44″N 126°58′33″E
- Designations

Treasures of South Korea
- Official name: Sujeongjeon Hall of Gyeongbokgung Palace
- Designated: 2012-03-02

Sujeongjeon (Korean: 수정전; Hanja: 修政殿; MR: Sujŏngjŏn; lit. 'Skillful Statecraft Hall') is a hall in the palace Gyeongbokgung in Seoul, South Korea. It is a designated Treasure of South Korea.

Sujeongjeon was used by various government offices over time. During the reign of Sejong the Great, it was a key facility involved in the invention of the Korean script Hangul. The building was destroyed in 1592, during the Imjin War. One of its annex buildings had a fire in 1813.

It was reconstructed in 1867 and used as a side hall for Sajeongjeon. This form of the building has largely persisted to the present. From 1872 to 1875, it stored Gojong's ritual portrait. In 1894, it was used by the Reform Council. Its surrounding buildings were destroyed by 1915 for the Chōsen Industrial Exhibition. It then become the only remaining government office in the palace. It became used as a museum building for various artifacts from Central Asia. From October 4, 1966 until 1975, it was occupied by a predecessor to the National Folk Museum of Korea.

Unusually for a side hall, it has a large wŏltae. It has rear chimneys, which likely allowed for the use of ondol heated floors.
