= Sajeongjeon =

Hall in Gyeongbokgung, Seoul, South Korea

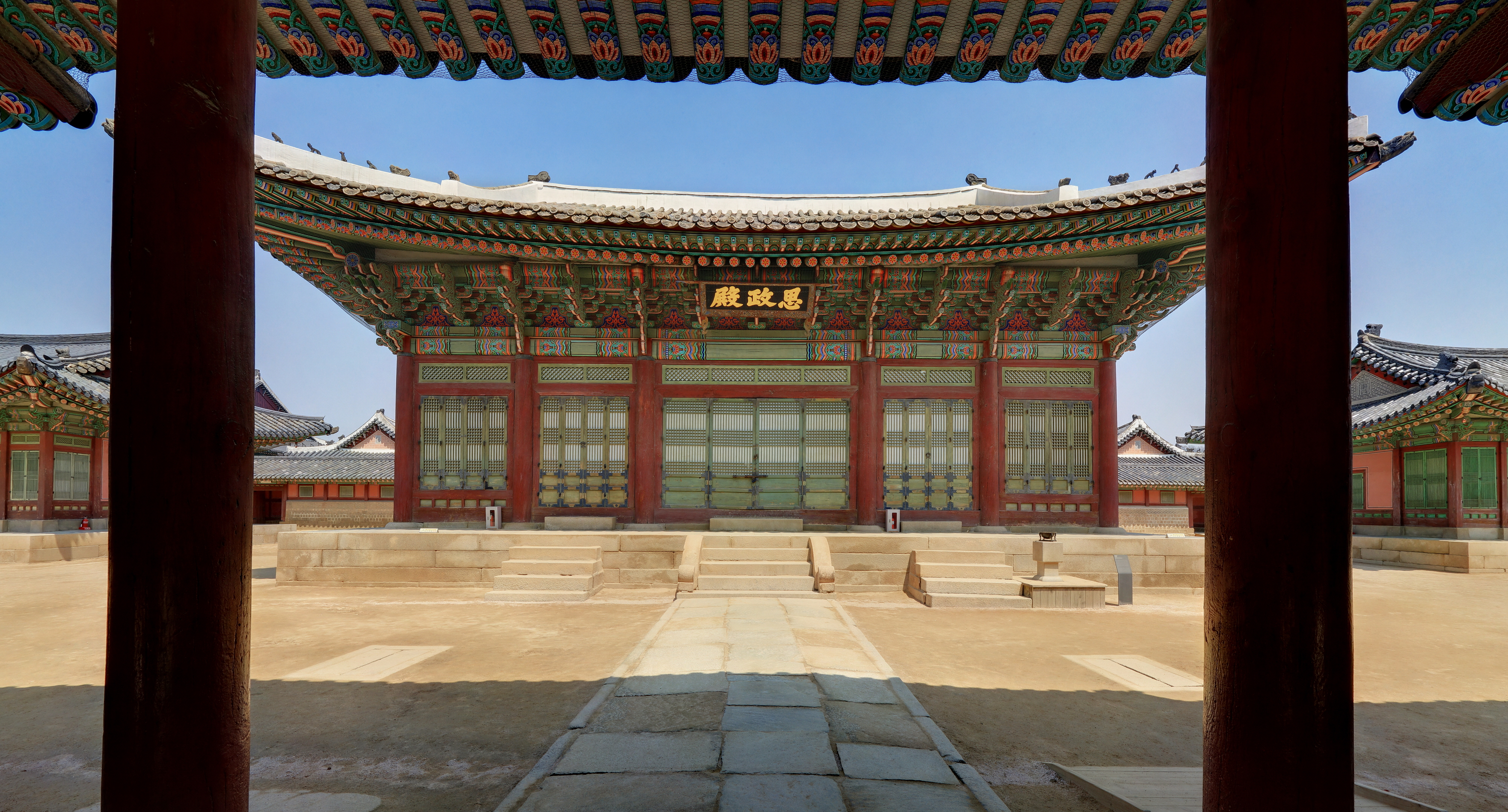
- The building
- Interactive map of the Sajeongjeon area

General information
- Coordinates: 37°34′45″N 126°58′37″E

Design and construction
- Designations

Treasures of South Korea
- Official name: Sajeongjeon Hall of Gyeongbokgung Palace
- Designated: 2012-03-02

Korean name
- Hangul: 사정전
- Hanja: 思政殿
- RR: Sajeongjeon
- MR: Sajŏngjŏn

Sajeongjeon (Korean: 사정전; Hanja: 思政殿; lit. 'Thinking of Good Deeds Hall') is a building in the palace Gyeongbokgung in Seoul, South Korea.

== Description ==
It is the main building of the p'yŏnjŏn (편전; 便殿). This area of the palace is where the king performs his daily private work, similar to an office. The king generally spends more time in this area than in the chŏngjŏn. A ceremony called sangcham (상참; 常參) was held in Sajeongjeon, where officials would pay their respects to the king. The ceremony was supposed to be daily, although this was often not enforced. The king used the building as a preparation space before royal ceremonies. The building is on top of a three-tiered stone platform. The interior is a single large room that is elaborately painted with dancheong. A painted throne is in the north center of the room.

== History ==
It was completed in 1395. At the time, it was called "Bopyeongcheong" (보평청; 報平廳; Pop'yŏngch'ŏng), but soon afterwards it received its current name. It was named by the Korean official Chŏng Tojŏn based on a quote from the Chinese text Book of Documents. It was among the first structures in the palace. It was expanded in 1429. It was destroyed in the 1553 fire and rebuilt. After being destroyed in 1592 during the Imjin War, it was rebuilt in 1867. The building's exterior has since survived until the present, although its interior was modified when the building was used as an exhibit hall during the 1915 Chōsen Industrial Exhibition. A wall mural in the building was removed in the early 2000s for the purpose of preservation and replaced with a replica. The building has a counterpart entrance gate Sajeongmun (사정문; 思政門; Sajŏngmun) that was also rebuilt in 1867 and has remained to the present.
