= Chōsen Industrial Exhibition =

1915 exhibition in colonial Korea

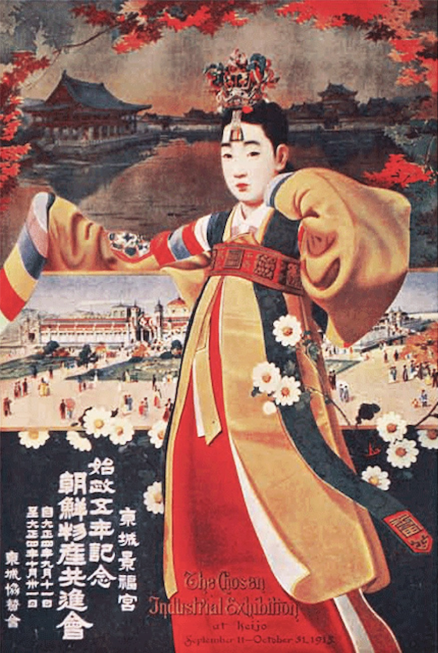
- An advertisement poster for the exhibition

Overview
- BIE-class: Unrecognized exposition
- Name: Chōsen Industrial Exhibition
- Building(s): Ilhogwan and Gyeongbokgung
- Visitors: 1 million

Participant(s)
- Countries: 3

Location
- Country: Korea, Empire of Japan
- City: Gyeongseong (Seoul)
- Venue: Gyeongbokgung
- Coordinates: 37°34′43″N 126°58′38″E

Timeline
- Opening: 11 September 1915
- Closure: 31 October 1915

- Chōsen Industrial Exhibition
- Hangul: 조선물산공진회
- Hanja: 朝鮮物産共進會
- RR: Joseon mulsan gongjinhoe
- MR: Chosŏn mulsan kongjinhoe

The Chōsen Industrial Exhibition (朝鮮物産共進会, Chōsen bussan kyōshinkai) was a colonial fair held in 1915 to mark the 5th anniversary of the establishment of Japanese Korea, and was the first official event of the new government. It was held in Keijō (Seoul) at Gyeongbokgung.

== Background ==
A major purpose of the exhibition was to portray Japan as a modern, positive force in Korea. The Governor-General of Chōsen wrote the following about the exhibition:

The purpose of the exhibition is [...] firstly to invest in the development of Korean industry, and second to set goals for improvement. As a result, Koreans will be made to reflect deeply on themselves and realize the truth that they should correct their bad habits of sloth, extravagance, and laziness and instead adopt good habits of diligence and progress. It will make them realize that they should seek improvement and develop industry and increase national wealth gradually through hard work and effort.

== Location and buildings ==
The exhibition was held in the grounds of the Gyeongbokgung palace and took place in both existing buildings, and newly constructed ones. The layout was designed to contrast historic Korean architecture with modern Japanese architecture and visitors entered through the existing Gwanghwamun gate, before the new Illhogwan (First Exhibition Hall), which stood in front of the Geunjeongjeon throne room.

== Contents ==
There were over 40,000 exhibits, mainly Japanese and Korean, with some Taiwanese exhibits. There were agricultural objects in Illhogwan, and further objects in the Kigyegwan (Machinery) and the Ch'amgogwan (Reference) halls.

== Visitors ==
Over 1 million people attended the exhibition before it closed on 31 October 1915.

== See also ==
- Japan–British Exhibition (1910)
