= Sawad (disambiguation) =

Sawad is a historical region in present-day southern Iraq.

Sawad (Arabic for black) may refer to:

== Places ==
- Al-Sawad, or Terre de Suète, an historical region east of the Sea of Galilee
- Sawad, Bhiwandi, a village in India
- Sawad, Yemen, a village in Yemen

== People ==
- Bharat Sawad (1968–?), Nepalese weightlifter
- Chandra Sawad (born 1991), Nepalese cricketer
- Fadhel Al Sawad, Bahraini attorney and politician

== See also ==
- Saud (disambiguation)
- Sawada, a Japanese surname
- Sawade, a village in Maharashtra, India
