= Keita Motoji =

Japanese kimono retailer (born 1984)

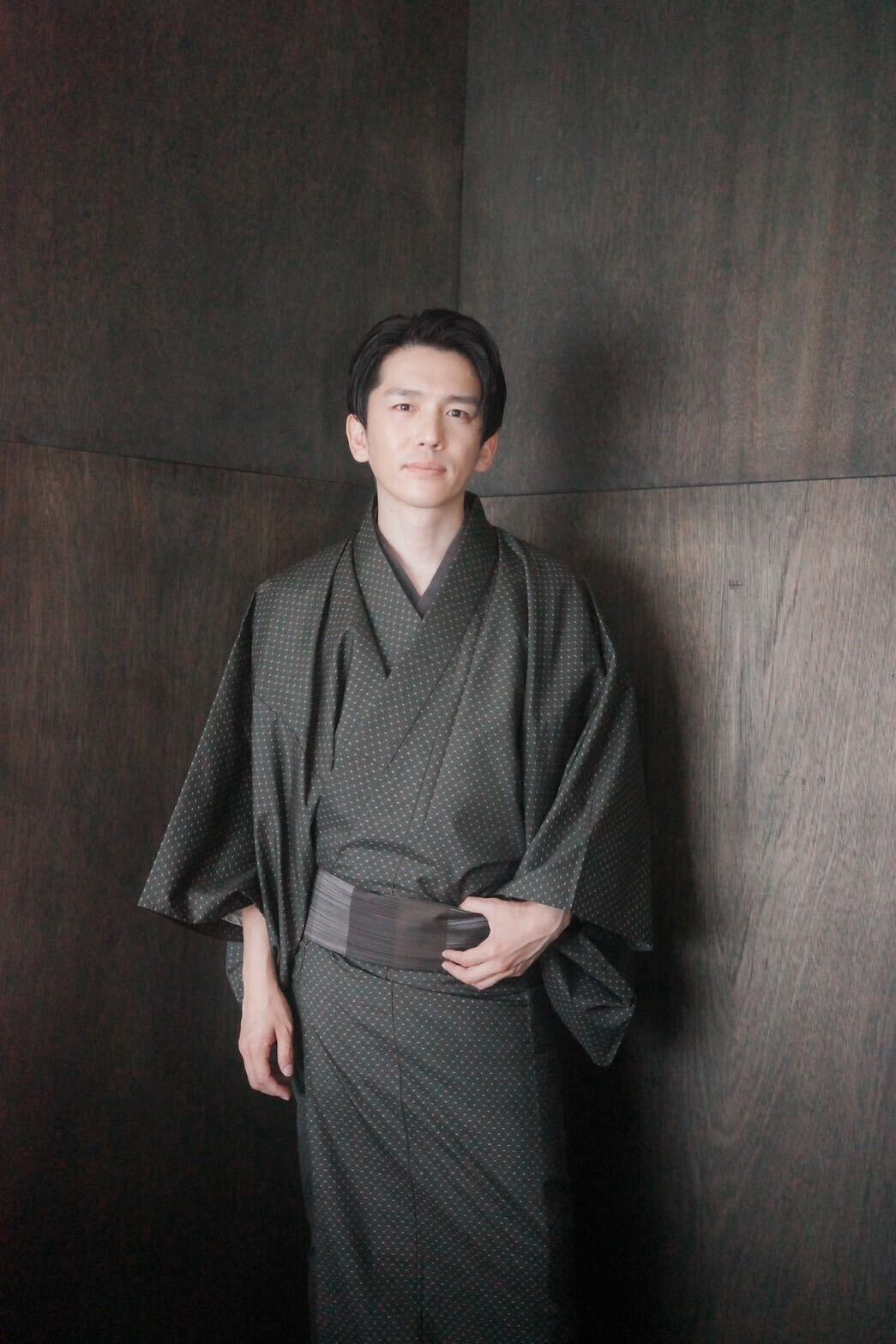
- Born: 27 August 1984 (age 41); Tokyo, Japan
- Occupation: Kimono Retailer
- Known for: Director of Ginza Motoji
- Website: motoji.co.jp

Keita Motoji (泉二啓太, Motoji Keita; born 1984) is a Japanese Kimono retailer. Keita directs the kimono brand Ginza Motoji, founded by his father Motoji Koumei in 1974.

== Early life and education ==
Keita attended Taimei Elementary School in Ginza, and studied fashion in the London College of Fashion. He then lived in Paris for a year, before returning to Japan in 2008 after 6 years abroad.

== Ginza Motoji ==
Keita joined Ginza Motoji in 2009, and took over the company as director in 2022.

Since 2015, Keita has directed the biannual Men's Kimono Collection, roughly coinciding with the western fashion season cycle. The collections are based on various themes, but often include themes of Japanese fashion history and the history of Ginza.

Keita has led many different collaborations with contemporary designers and artists, notably Tsurutaro Kataoka in 2023. In 2023, Keita launched Deichu no Gin (Fabric from the Mud), a collection as part of Hiraki Project, with the dyer Yukihito Kanai and weaver Shinya Yanagi. Fabric woven by Yanagi was dyed with different natural dyes, including mud and indigo by Kanai.

== Curatorial Work ==
In 2025, Keita Motoji curated the exhibition CODE (考土) at the MIKKE Gallery in Yotsuya, Tokyo. He was selected for this opportunity following his receipt of the prestigious Curator's Prize, awarded for his work on the "Hiraki Project". The exhibition invited textile artists to creatively respond to the unique environment and cultural heritage of Amami Ōshima, specifically through the use of indigenous materials such as local mud and natural dyes.

Participating artists include: Yukihito Kanai, Daichiro Shinjo, Katsura Takasuka,Shinya Yanagi, Hiroki Yamazaki, and Moeco Yamazaki.

== Philanthropy ==
Keita and the Ginza Motoji team annually conduct willow dyeing workshops at Taimei Elementary School, Keita's alma mater. They teach the students how to produce dye from the willow tree, and dye the fabric. They also host a lesson teaching the children history of the willow tree in Ginza. The fabric is dyed using willow gathered from the school grounds and nearby areas.

== Publications ==
On October 18, 2024, Motoji published his first book, Atarashii Kimono (Japanese: 『人生を豊かにする「あたらしい着物」』), introducing contemporary kimono styling and kimono culture to a broad audience.
