= Ginza Motoji =

Ginza Motoji (銀座もとじ) is a kimono retailer based in the Ginza district of Tokyo, Japan. Founded in June 1979 by Motoji Koumei (泉二 弘明), originally from Amami Ōshima, the company operates separate shops for women’s kimono ("Waori Wasen") and the industry’s first dedicated men’s kimono outlet ("Otoko no Kimono"), opened in 2002. The company is now helmed by Keita Motoji as of 2023.

== History ==
Koumei Motoji established "Motoji Gofukuten" in 1979. The business was renamed "Ginza Motoji" in 1995 and incorporated in 1998. In 2002, the men’s kimono specialty store, Otoko no Kimono, was opened, reportedly the first of its kind in Japan.

== Craftsmanship and innovation ==
In 2007, Ginza Motoji introduced "Platinum Boy," a silk made exclusively from domestically bred male silkworms. The silk is praised for its strength, luster, and dye receptivity. This innovation earned the company a Ministry of Agriculture, Forestry and Fisheries Prize in 2015. Each bolt of Platinum Boy fabric includes a certificate listing all artisans involved in its creation—from silkworm breeder to weaver.

Ginza Motoji also offers a participatory program called the "Platinum Boy Monogatari," where customers follow the full production process of their garment across a year, visiting sericulture farms, weaving studios, and dye workshops, and receive a commemorative book and ownership certificate.

== Community and education ==
Since 1998, Ginza Motoji has hosted annual willow-dye workshops for students at Taimei Elementary School in Ginza. The program uses locally pruned willow and introduces natural dyeing methods and textile ecology to children.

== Leadership ==
Koumei Motoji served as company head until 2022. His son, Keita Motoji (born 1984), took over in 2022 after working in the business since 2009. Keita studied fashion in London and Paris, and under his leadership, the brand has launched new design collaborations, digital initiatives, and cultural exhibitions.

== Exhibitions and cultural initiatives ==
The company has led curated exhibitions like "Deichū no Gin," part of the HIRAKI Project, and "Kōdo (考土)–Amami," which bring together textile artisans to explore regional identity and natural materials.

== See also ==
- Shokuraku Asano
- Okujun
- Matsubara Nobuo
- Moriguchi Kunihiko
- Ōshima tsumugi
