= Sawadi =

Sawadi may refer to:

- Sawadi, Myanmar
- Al Sawadi, Oman

== See also ==
- Sawad (disambiguation)
- Sawadin
