= Okujun =

Okujun Co., Ltd. (奥順株式会社) is a Japanese kimono and textile manufacturer based in Yūki City, Ibaraki Prefecture.

Founded in 1907, the company has played a central role in the production and distribution of Yuki-tsumugi (結城紬), a traditional silk textile technique designated as an Important Intangible Cultural Property in 1956 and listed by UNESCO in 2010 as an Intangible Cultural Heritage of Humanity.

== History ==
Okujun was established in 1907 as a kimono wholesaler and has since operated as a key regional distributor and coordinator of Yuki-tsumugi textiles. In addition to design development, yarn procurement, and placing weaving orders with local craftsmen, the company also handles finishing processes such as degumming (yudōshi) in-house.

== Textile collections ==
Okujun currently offers two main fabric collections:

=== Honba Yuki Tsumugi ===
Supreme Yuki Silk is a premium fabric created through more than 40 handcraft processes, based on traditional Yuki-tsumugi techniques. Yarn is hand-spun from floss silk by hand. The cloth is woven using a traditional back-tension loom (jibata), where the weaver controls the tension using their own body.

=== Ishige Yuki Tsumugi ===
Yuki Silk is a more accessible line that preserves the essence of handmade Yuki-tsumugi while integrating power-assisted spinning and weaving processes using a mix of hand-guided and mechanical techniques.

== Production techniques ==
=== Yarn spinning ===
Floss silk is spun by hand, either entirely manually or using a power-assisted tool, depending on the product line.

=== Pattern creation ===
Traditional kasuri (絣) patterns are created by binding threads before dyeing according to a pattern.

=== Weaving ===
There are three types of looms used in the production of Yuki Tsumugi.

- Jibata (地機): a back-tension loom tied to the weaver’s waist.
- Takahata (高機): a foot-treadle loom.
- Semi-mechanical looms for broader fabric widths in Yuki Silk.

== Cultural significance ==
In 2010, the Yuki-tsumugi production process was inscribed on the UNESCO Representative List of the Intangible Cultural Heritage of Humanity. Okujun’s educational and tourism facilities help preserve and transmit these techniques to the public.

== See also ==
- Japanese textiles
- Ginza Motoji
- Shokuraku Asano
