= Saud (disambiguation) =

The House of Saud is the royal house of Saudi Arabia.

Saud may also refer to:

== People ==
- Saud (name)

== Places ==
- Săud, a village in Buntești, Hungary
- Saud, Pagudpud, Philippines

== See also ==
- Saudi (disambiguation)
- Sawad (disambiguation)
