= Ueba Esou =

Company in Kyoto city, Japan

UEBAESOU CO., LTD.
- Native name: 上羽絵惣株式会社
- Industry: Production and retail of traditional Japanese paint pigments
- Founded: 1751
- Headquarters: Shimogyō-ku, Kyoto, Japan
- Website: https://www.ueba.co.jp/

Ueba Esou (上羽絵惣株式会社 うえばえそうかぶしきがいしゃ uebaesou kabushiki-gaisha) is a manufacturer and seller of natural pigments (iwaenogu, gofun) used in Japanese-style paintings (Nihonga), with more than 260 years of history. It is located in the Shimogyō-ku ward of Kyoto.

== History ==
Since the capital was moved to Kyoto in 794 and up to the Meiji Era, Kyoto was the epicenter for the development of the history of Japanese paintings. For this reason, there was a high demand for the pigments used in the broad range of creations related with this particular field.

Ueba Esou was founded in 1751. According to its 10th generation owner, Ms. Yumi Ishida, in the past Kyoto had a thriving industry of painters, usually also in charge of creating the designs necessary for the Kyo-yūzen and the Nishijin-ori fabrics produced in the city. In turn, there were plenty of shops offering pigments of natural origin, about 20 in the vicinity of Ueba Esou’s location.

== Present day ==
Nowadays Ueba Esou is the only store offering natural pigments left in the area. It continues to produce and sell pigments primarily used in Nihonga, such as iwaenogu (made by grinding mineral ores), which in some cases includes lapis lazuli and other precious materials, resulting in a high-priced product. The company is also known for the production and selling of gofun, a white pigment made with the shell of hotate, a species of scallop (Mizuhopecten yessoensis).

In recent years, the company introduced a new product called “Gofun Nail”, a water-based nail polish made using gofun pigment, which enjoys popularity among the younger generation and was one of the winners of the 2015 Good Design Awards.
