= Fujiko =

- Pronunciation: Fujiko
- Gender: Female

Origin
- Origin: Japanese
- Meaning: Wisteria, and the suffix 子 (-ko), which means child
- Region of origin: Japanese

Other names
- Related names: Fuzjko

Fujiko is a Japanese feminine given name, usually derived from 藤 (Fuji), which means "Wisteria", and the suffix 子 (-ko), which means "child" or "child of". Notable people with the name include:

- Fujiko (不二子; born 1980), a Japanese model and actress
- Fujiko Fujima (藤間 藤子; 1907 – 1998), Japanese dancer
- Fujiko Fujio (藤子 不二雄; 1933 – 2022), the pen name of a duo of Japanese cartoon artists
- Fujiko Kato (加藤 富士子; born 1946), Japanese cross-country skier
- Fujiko Kojima (小島 藤子; born 1993), Japanese actress and fashion model
- Fujiko Nakaya (中谷 芙二子; born 1933), Japanese artist
- Fujiko Sawada (澤田ふじ子; born 1946), Japanese novelist
- Fujiko Shiraga (白髪 富士子; 1928–2015), Japanese avant-garde artist
- Fujiko Takimoto (瀧本 富士子), a Japanese voice actress
- Fujiko Yamamoto (山本 富士子; born 1931), Japanese actress
- Ingrid Fuzjko V. Georgii-Hemming, also known as Fujiko Hemming, a pianist of classical music

== Fictional characters ==
- Fujiko Mine (峰 不二子), a character in Monkey Punch's manga series Lupin III
- Evil Rose (Fujiko Hinomoto), a character in the Rumble Roses female wrestling games
