= Motoji Koumei =

Japanese kimono retailer (born 1949)

Koumei Motoji
- Born: 10 December 1949 (age 76); Amami Oshima, Japan
- Occupation: Kimono Retailer
- Known for: Founder of Ginza Motoji
- Children: 2 (Keita Motoji)
- Website: motoji.co.jp

Motoji Koumei (泉二弘明, Motoji Kōmei; born 1949) is a Japanese Kimono retailer. He founded the Ginza Motoji kimono house.

Ginza Motoji was founded by Motoji Koumei in Ginza, Tokyo, in 1979. Koumei directed the brand for 42 years until September 2021, and the brand is now directed by his son, Keita Motoji.

== Personal History ==
Motoji Koumei was born in the Amami Islands, and originally hoped to be an athlete, until an injury led him to change path.

== Ginza Motoji ==
The brand consists of two stores, a women's kimono store, Ginza Motoji Waori Wasen, and a men's store, Ginza Motoji Otoko-no-kimono, both based in central Ginza. The mens specialty store is considered to be Japans first mens kimono store, and was opened in 2002.

The brand also hosted a shop men's store in the Osaka Hankyu Department Store, as well as an Ōshima-tsumugi specialty store and a kimono cleaning store called Shikkai, all of which are now closed.

The name Motoji is written with the uncommon kanji characters 泉二, which can be difficult to read as Motoji. To make it easier for customers, the store's name is stylized as 銀座もとじ, using hiragana for better readability.
