= Sawada =

Sawada is a Japanese surname.

== People ==
=== Sports ===
- Aki Sawada (born 1988), Japanese figure skater
- Atsuo Sawada (born 1964), Japanese wrestler
- Atsushi Sawada (沢田 敦; born 1958), Japanese alpine skier
- Bunkichi Sawada (沢田 文吉; 1920–2006), Japanese pole vaulter
- Hiroyuki Sawada (born 1974), former Japanese football player
- Kazuki Sawada (born 1982), former Japanese football player
- Keitaro Sawada (沢田 桂太郎; born 1998), Japanese cyclist
- Kentaro Sawada (born 1970), former Japanese football player
- Raymond Sawada (born 1985), Canadian ice hockey player

=== Arts and entertainment ===
- Fujiko Sawada, Japanese novelist
- Kan Sawada, Japanese composer
- Kenji Sawada (born 1948), Japanese musician
- Kenya Sawada (born 1965), Japanese actor
- Kyōichi Sawada (1936–1970), Japanese photographer
- Shoko Sawada (born 1962), Japanese singer-songwriter, reporter, and radio personality
- Shungo Sawada (沢田 駿吾; 1930–2006), Japanese jazz guitarist
- Taiji Sawada, Japanese rock musician
- Tomonori Sawada, Japanese composer
- Toshiko Sawada (born 1936), Japanese voice actress

=== Business ===
- Jun Sawada (born 1955), Japanese businessman, CEO of Nippon Telegraph and Telephone

=== Other ===
- Nikki Bridges Flynn (née Sawada; 1923–2003), American civil rights activist
- Setsuzō Sawada, Japanese diplomat
- Shigeru Sawada (沢田 茂; 1887–1980), Japanese general
- Shingo Sawada, Japanese shogi player

== Fictional characters ==
- Captain Sawada, character in the Street Fighter: The Movie videogames
- Tsuna Sawada, main character of Reborn!
- Michiko Sawada, a character from anime and manga from Perman
- Takeshi Sawada, a character from the anime, manga and multimedia franchise Captain Tsubasa

== Places ==
- Sawada, Egypt, a village in middle Egypt
