= Saudi =

Saudi or Saudi Arabian may refer to:

- Saudi Arabia
- Saudis, people from Saudi Arabia
- Saudi culture, the culture of Saudi Arabia
- House of Saud, the ruling family of Saudi Arabia

== See also ==
- Saud (disambiguation)
