= Saud (name) =

Saud is an Arabic origin word which is used as a masculine given name and a surname. People with the name include:

== Given name ==
- Saud (actor), a Pakistani actor
- Saud Ahmed, a Bangladeshi-American music artist/producer
- Saud Alam, Indian politician
- Saud Alhogbani (born 2003), Saudi Arabian tennis player
- Saud Alsanousi (born 1981), Kuwaiti writer and journalist
- Saud Al-Basher, Saudi Arabian karateka
- Saud al-Dosari (1968–2015), Saudi television presenter
- Saud Habib (born 1979), Kuwaiti sport shooter
- Saud Hamood (born 1989), Saudi football player
- Saud Kariri (born 1980), Saudi Arabian football player
- Saud Majeed, Pakistani politician
- Saud Memon (c. 1961–2007), Pakistani businessman
- Saud bin Rashid Al Mualla (born 1952), ruler of the Emirate of Umm Al Quwain
- Saud Al-Muwaizri (born 1969), Kuwaiti boxer
- Saud Al-Nasr (born 1998), Qatari football player
- Saud al-Qahtani (born 1978), Saudi consultant
- Saud Qamar (born 1980), Kuwaiti cricketer
- Saud bin Saqr Al Qasimi (born 1956), ruler of the Emirate of Ras Al Khaimah
- Saud bin Abdulaziz Al Rashid (1898 – 1920), Emir of Jabal Shammar
- Saud Nasser Al-Saud Al-Sabah (1944–2012), Kuwaiti politician and diplomat
- Saud of Saudi Arabia (1902–1969), the second King of Saudi Arabia
- Saud Al Kabeer bin Abdulaziz Al Saud (1882–1959), Saudi royal
- Saud bin Abdullah Al Saud (1946–2020), Saudi royal
- Saud bin Abdul Muhsin Al Saud (born 1947), Saudi royal
- Saud bin Fahd Al Saud (born 1950), Saudi royal
- Saud bin Faisal Al Saud (1833–1875), ruler of second Saudi state
- Saud bin Faisal Al Saud (1940–2015), Saudi royal
- Saud bin Khalid Al Saud, Saudi royal
- Saud ibn Muhammad ibn Muqrin (1640–1726), eponymous ancestor of the House of Saud
- Saud bin Nayef Al Saud (born 1956), Saudi royal
- Saud bin Salman Al Saud (born 1986), Saudi royal
- Saud Shakeel (born 1995), Pakistani cricketer
- Saud Al Thani (disambiguation), multiple people from Al Thani family of Qatar
- Saud Zidan (born 1999), Saudi Arabian football player

== Surname ==
- Badrul Anam Saud, Bangladeshi film director and scriptwriter
- Javeria Saud, Pakistani actress
- Narayan Prakash Saud, Nepalese politician
- Nar Bahadur Saud, Nepalese writer
