= Saud Al Thani =

Saud Al Thani is a Qatari royalty name, may refer to:

- Saud bin Abdelaziz bin Hamad Al Thani (born 1949), prince of Qatar
- Saud bin Muhammed Al Thani (1966–2014), prince of Qatar
- Saud bin Ahmed Al Thani, footballer and prince of Qatar; see House of Thani
