= Fadhel Al Sawad =

Bahraini politician

- فاضل السواد

Member of the Council of Representatives (Bahrain)
- Incumbent
- Assumed office 2018
- Monarch: Hamad bin Isa Al Khalifa
- Prime Minister: Khalifa bin Salman Al Khalifa, Salman, Crown Prince of Bahrain
- Parliamentary group: independent
- Constituency: Eighth District of the Capital Governorate

Personal details
- Born: Fadel Abbas Ali Isa Al Sawad
- Occupation: attorney

Fadhel Abbas Ali Isa Al Sawad (Arabic: فاضل عباس علي عيسى السواد) is a Bahraini attorney and politician. He was sworn into the Council of Representatives on December 12, 2018, representing the Eighth District of the Capital Governorate.

== Career ==
Al Sawad defended photojournalist Ahmed Humaidan in court against charges of attacking a police station during the Bahraini uprising of 2011, but Humaidan was convicted and sentenced to ten years of imprisonment.

== Council of Representatives ==
In the 2018 Bahraini general election, Al Sawad ran to represent the Eighth District in the Capital Governorate in the Council of Representatives, the nation’s lower house of Parliament. He received 875 votes (39.83%) in the first round on November 24. Since a candidate must secure more than 50% (an absolute majority) of the total votes in their constituency, this result necessitated a runoff on December 1, in which he defeated his opponent, Mohammed Ashour, with 1,085 votes (62.94%).
