= Sawade =

Village in Maharashtra

- village
- Location in Maharashtra, India Sawade (India)
- Coordinates: 19.8019592°N 73.0611882°E
- Country: India
- State: Maharashtra
- District: Palghar
- Taluka: Vikramgad
- Elevation: 49 m (161 ft)

Population (2011)
  - Total: 2,926
- Time zone: UTC+5:30 (IST)
- 2011 census code: 551788

Sawade is a village in the Palghar district of Maharashtra, India. It is located in the Vikramgad taluka.

== Demographics ==
According to the 2011 census of India, Sawade has 556 households. The effective literacy rate (i.e. the literacy rate of population excluding children aged 6 and below) is 57.63%.

Demographics (2011 Census)
	Total	Male	Female
Population	2926	1442	1484
Children aged below 6 years	509	272	237
Scheduled caste	0	0	0
Scheduled tribe	2899	1427	1472
Literates	1393	797	596
Workers (all)	1646	813	833
Main workers (total)	1344	732	612
Main workers: Cultivators	831	432	399
Main workers: Agricultural labourers	463	265	198
Main workers: Household industry workers	2	1	1
Main workers: Other	48	34	14
Marginal workers (total)	302	81	221
Marginal workers: Cultivators	126	20	106
Marginal workers: Agricultural labourers	122	25	97
Marginal workers: Household industry workers	2	1	1
Marginal workers: Others	52	35	17
Non-workers	1280	629	651
