= Fujiko Sawada =

Fujiko Sawada (澤田ふじ子; born September 5, 1946) is a Japanese novelist. She is best-known for her works of historical fiction.

== Biography ==
Sawada was born in Handa, Japan on September 5. 1948. She graduated from Aichi Women's College in 1965, then moved to Kyoto in 1966. She married a journalist named Haruo Sawada in the same year, and they had a daughter, Toko Sawada. She also learned to weave Nishijin-ori at this time.

Sawada began writing while working as a high school teacher. Her first story debuted in 1975. She began gaining attention as a writer of historical fiction with her 1978 novel Rajōmon (羅城門). Her works rarely have happy endings, but her knowledge of Japanese arts clearly shines through.

== Selected works ==
- Rajōmon (羅城門), 1978
