= Taimei Elementary School =

Japanese public school

- 中央区立泰明小学校
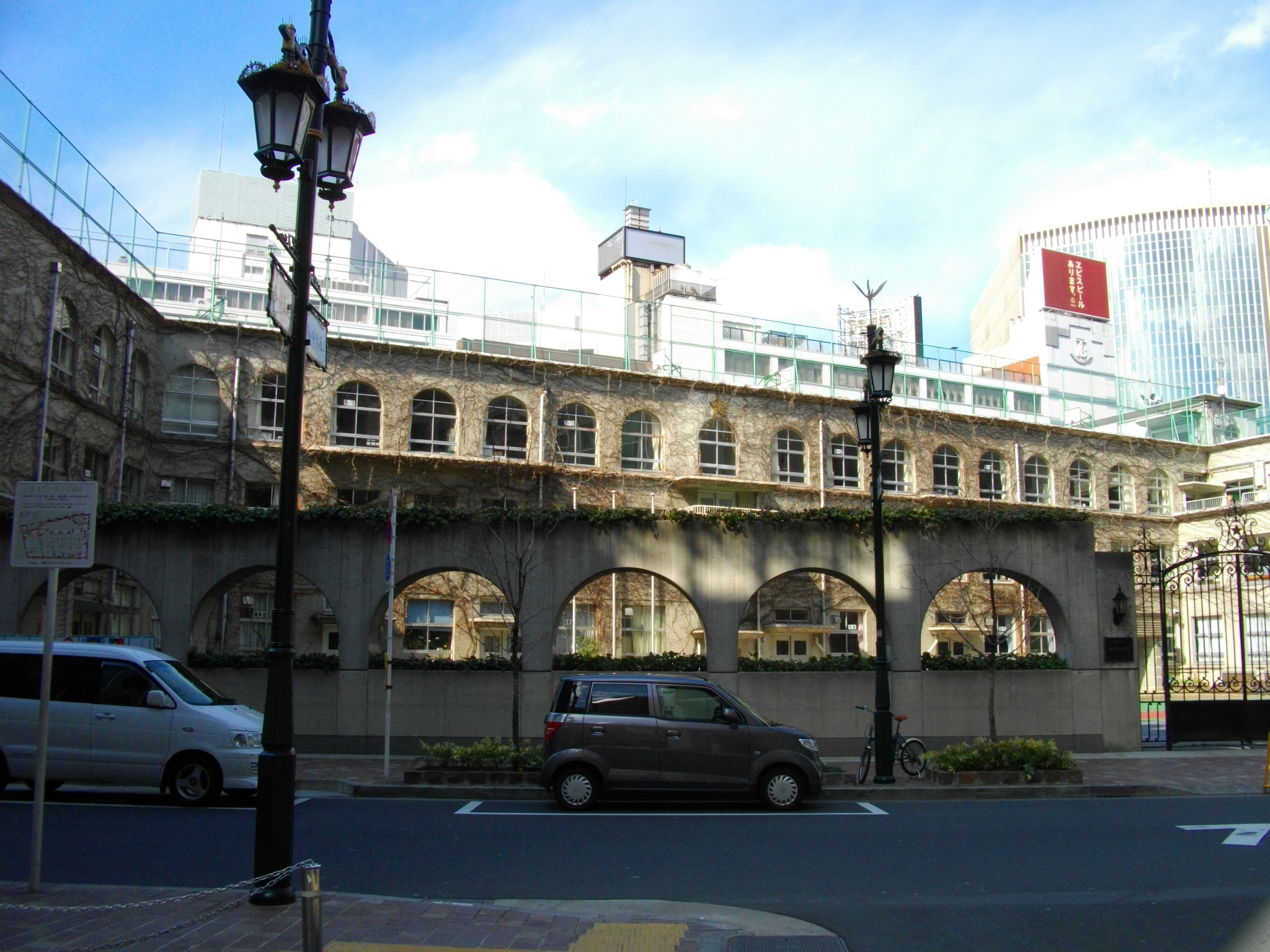
- School building

Location
- 5-1-13 Ginza, Chuo, Tokyo 104-0061 東京都中央区銀座5-1-13; 35.672389°N 139.7615°E

Information
- Type: Public
- Established: 1878
- Oversight: Chuo City Board of Education
- Gender: Coeducational
- Campus type: Urban
- Website: www.chuo-tky.ed.jp/~taimei-es/

Chuo Municipal Taimei Elementary School (中央区立泰明小学校, Chūō-kuritsu Taimei Shōgakkō) is a public elementary school in Ginza, Chuo, Tokyo. It is operated by the Chuo City Board of Education (中央区教育委員会).

It has a plaque for Heritage of Industrial Modernization. Another plaque stated that the façade, which has ivy, is seen as a symbol in Ginza.

The school's attendance boundary includes the following portions of Ginza: All of 5-8 chome, and parts of 1-chome (2-10-ban, and two lots of 11-ban), 2-chome (2-9 ban), 3-chome (2-8 ban), and 4-chome (1-8 ban).

== History ==
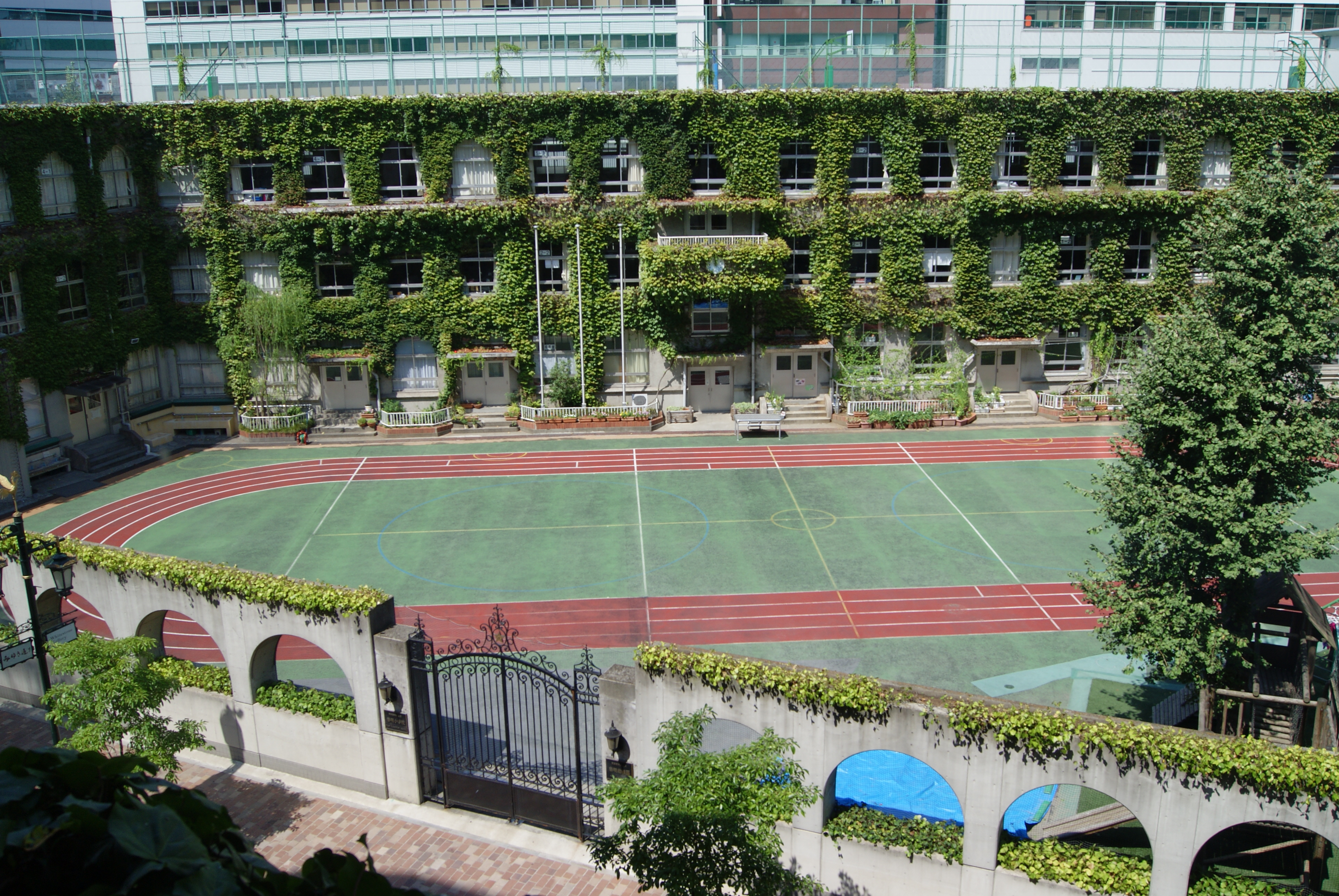
The school building, covered in ivy

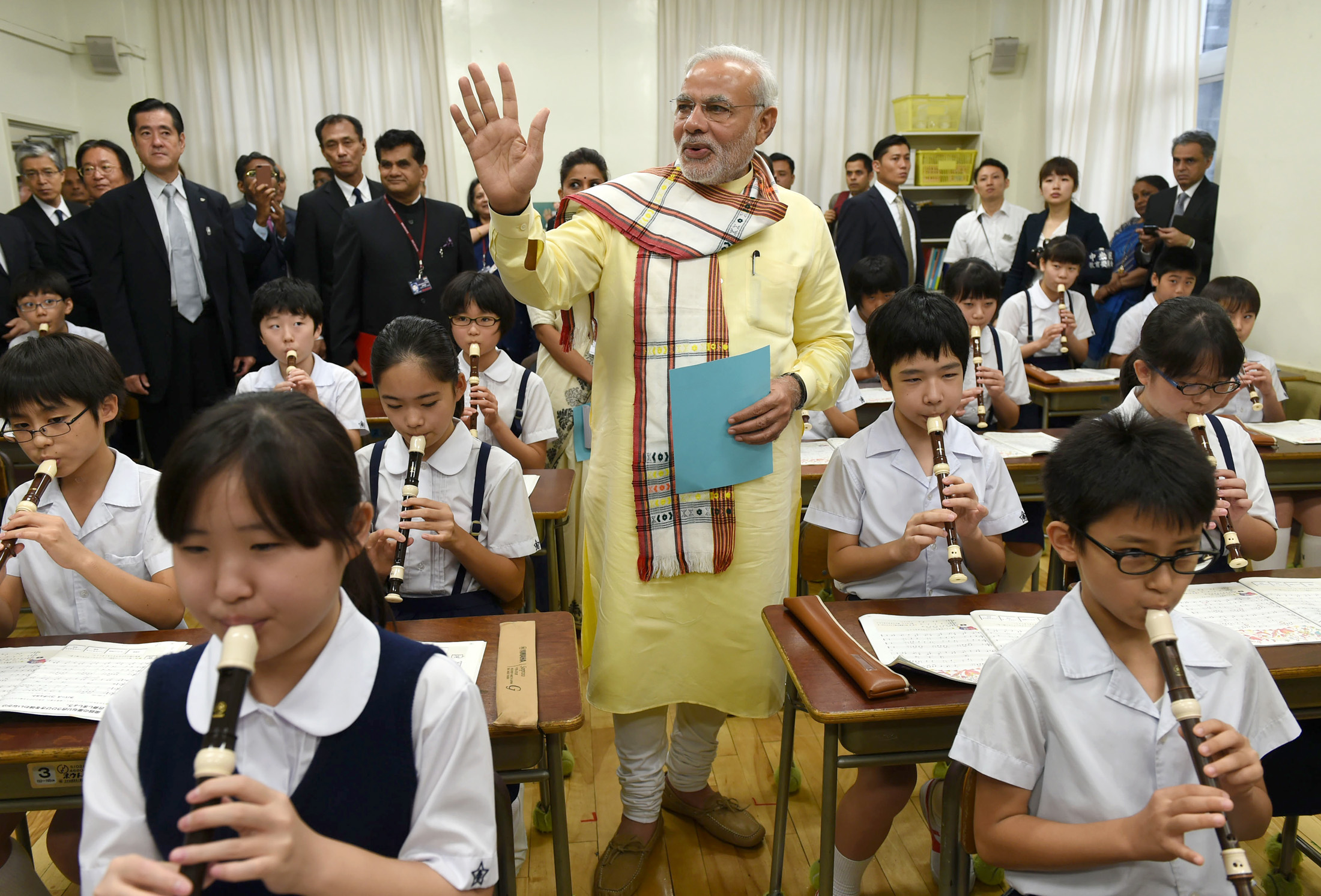
Prime Minister of India Narendra Modi in a music class at Taimei Elementary

The school's year of establishment is 1878.

A new building opened in 1912.

Another new building was established after the Great Kanto Earthquake.

U.S. bombing raids destroyed the school in May 1945. It was rebuilt to closely match the previous building.

By 2016 some new family-style apartments opened in the school's attendance boundary, prompting an increase of students in the attendance zone.

The school requires its students to wear school uniforms. In 2018 the school announced that a new set of optional uniforms would be designed by Armani. They were criticized by parents, Japanese government officials and opinion columnists being relatively expensive, especially as prices of school uniforms in general in Japan increased. The complete set had a cost of over 80,000 yen, more than $730 U.S. dollars. The price for the smallest compulsory set was over 100% more than that of the other uniform.

== Student body ==
In 2016 the school had 334 students, with over 30 of them residing in the attendance boundary. Other students commuted from other areas such as Harumi and Kachidoki.

== Operations ==
The cafeteria uses the same menu used in other Chuo City schools, although for special occasions it sources its broth from the owner of Ginza Kojyu. Area museums and theaters are places visited during field trips.

The school also does annual dyeing lessons with a local kimono store, Ginza Motoji, where the children use leaves from the local willow trees to dye textiles.

== Notable alumni ==
- Yukiji Asaoka
- Shinzo Fukuhara
- Mitsuharu Kaneko
- Takeshi Katō
- Tokoku Kitamura
- Fumimaro Konoe
- Mari-Chiyo
- Yoshiko Okada
- Tōson Shimazaki

== See also ==
- Elementary schools in Japan
- List of elementary schools in Tokyo
