= Sawad, Bhiwandi =

Village in Maharashtra

Sawad
- village
- Location in Maharashtra, India Sawad (India)
- Coordinates: 19.2994175°N 73.1511872°E
- Country: India
- State: Maharashtra
- District: Thane
- Taluka: Bhiwandi
- Elevation: 17 m (56 ft)

Population (2011)
  - Total: 1,419
- Time zone: UTC+5:30 (IST)
- 2011 census code: 552634

Sawad is a village in the Thane district of Maharashtra, India. It is located in the Bhiwandi taluka.

== Demographics ==
According to the 2011 census of India, Sawad has 283 households. The effective literacy rate (i.e. the literacy rate of population excluding children aged 6 and below) is 79.83%.

Demographics (2011 Census)
	Total	Male	Female
Population	1419	723	696
Children aged below 6 years	219	108	111
Scheduled caste	22	9	13
Scheduled tribe	18	9	9
Literates	958	556	402
Workers (all)	505	417	88
Main workers (total)	389	332	57
Main workers: Cultivators	130	111	19
Main workers: Agricultural labourers	39	34	5
Main workers: Household industry workers	18	10	8
Main workers: Other	202	177	25
Marginal workers (total)	116	85	31
Marginal workers: Cultivators	13	7	6
Marginal workers: Agricultural labourers	69	49	20
Marginal workers: Household industry workers	3	2	1
Marginal workers: Others	31	27	4
Non-workers	914	306	608
