= Shokuraku Asano =

Shokuraku Asano (織楽浅野) is a Nishijin-ori weaving firm based in Kyoto, Japan, specializing in obi and kimono textiles that harmonize traditional craftsmanship with a minimalist, refined aesthetic.

== History ==
The brand's origins trace back to 1924, when Masakazu Asano established Asano Orimono. Hiroshi Asano formally launched the modern entity in 1975, and in 1980, Hirotaka Asano (born 1955) joined to rebrand the company as Shokuraku Asano Co., Ltd., under the guiding philosophy of “Enjoying Weaving” (織を楽しむ心).

== Founder ==
Hirotaka Asano (浅野 裕尚), born in 1955 in Kyoto's Nishijin district, is the brand's representative director. Engaged in weaving culture from childhood, he curates a vast atelier archive of textiles, design books, and ephemera, which serve as ongoing creative references.

== Artistic Philosophy ==
Asano emphasizes minimalist design and the aesthetic philosophy that beauty emerges from relationships rather than ornamentation — a concept influenced by author Tanizaki Jun'ichirō. He favors texture, spatial balance, and coordination across ensemble elements over elaborate metallic decoration.

== Independent Recognition ==
In 2020, fashion-lifestyle magazine Fujingaho featured a workshop visit by actress Kō Shibasaki, during which Asano discussed obi construction, weaving history, and design depth — drawing public interest in his refined, shadow-oriented weaving philosophy. Shokuraku Asano's obi are also regularly featured in leading kimono publications such as 美しいキモノ (Utsukushii Kimono) and 着物サロン (Kimono Salon), where their understated elegance and compatibility with modern coordination are frequently highlighted.

== Designs and Archive ==
With over 4,000 ledgered designs in the atelier, Shokuraku Asano draws direction from a wide range of historical and visual materials, from antique lace and Western art motifs to collected ephemera; all distilled into coordinated obi for both traditional and contemporary kimono wearers.

== Production ==
The brand adheres to Nishijin-ori's segmented production model: distinct artisans manage yarn preparation, dyeing, warping, and weaving on both wooden and Jacquard looms to achieve rich textures and nuanced depth.

== Significance ==
Shokuraku Asano occupies a notable position within Kyoto's evolving weaving culture by balancing heritage and creative restraint. While some Nishijin artisans embrace digital technologies, Asano emphasizes human-driven aesthetic subtlety anchoring the craft in philosophical continuity.

== See also ==
- Nishijin-ori
- Kyoto
- Kimono
- Tanizaki Jun'ichirō
- Ginza Motoji
