= Matsubara Nobuo =

Japanese textiles artist (b. 1965)

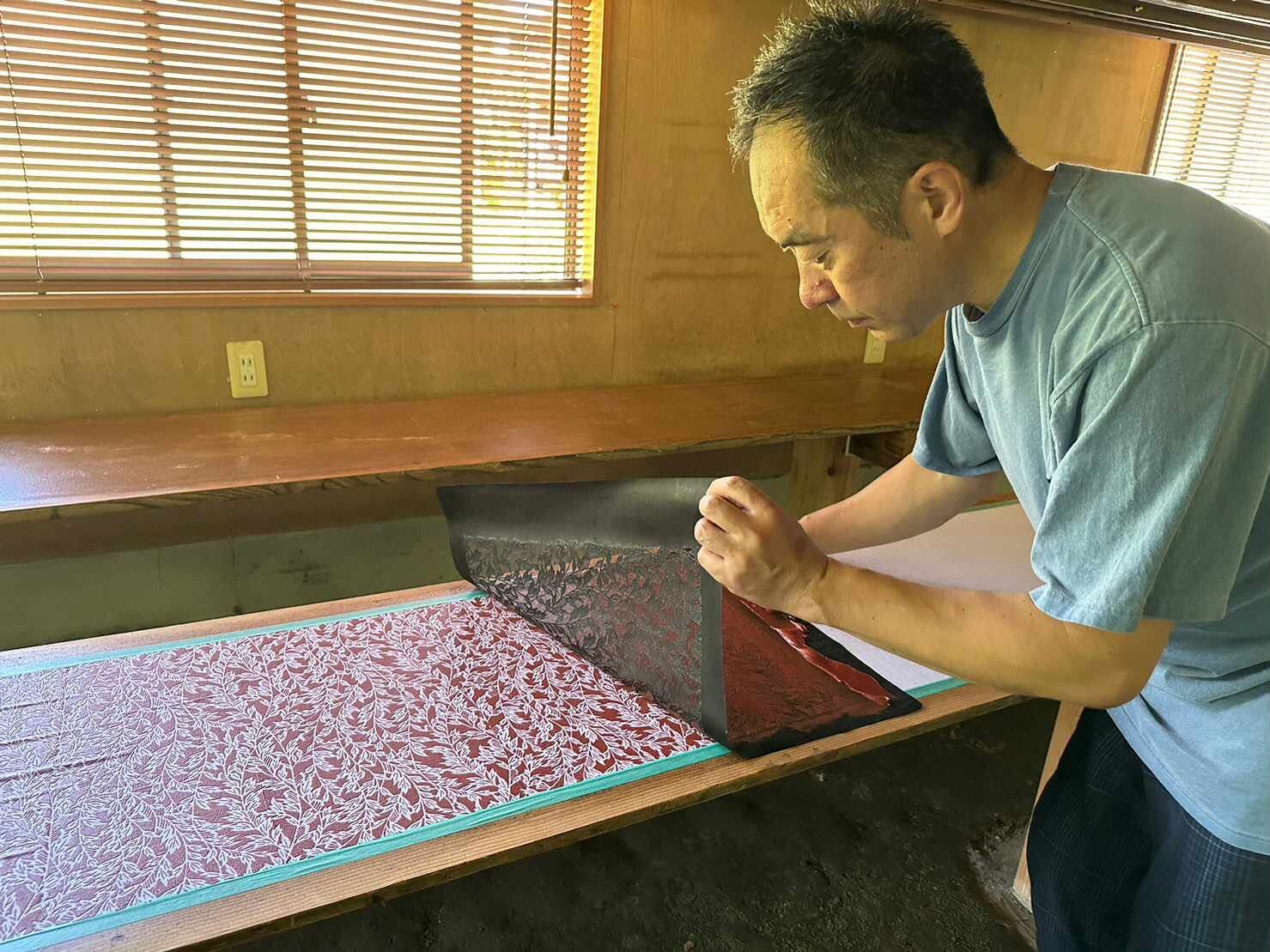
Matsubara Nobuo applying nori (resist paste) with an Ise-Katagami to fabric.

Nobuo Matsubara (Japanese:松原伸生, Matsubara Nobuo, born June 14 1965) is a Japanese textile artist who specializes in dying kimonos using the Nagaita-Chugata technique of resist dyeing.

== Biography ==
Matsubara was born in Edogawa, Tokyo, in 1965. He attended Tokyo Metropolitan Technical High School, where he studied in the design department; graduating in 1984. He then began studying with his father, Toshio Matsubara, to learn nagahada nakagata and ai-gata dyeing processes.

His studio is based in Kimitsu (君津市, Kimitsu-shi) located in Chiba Prefecture, Japan and he has worked there since he was 19.

He was named a Living National Treasure in 2023 for his work in the field of Nagaita-Chugata.

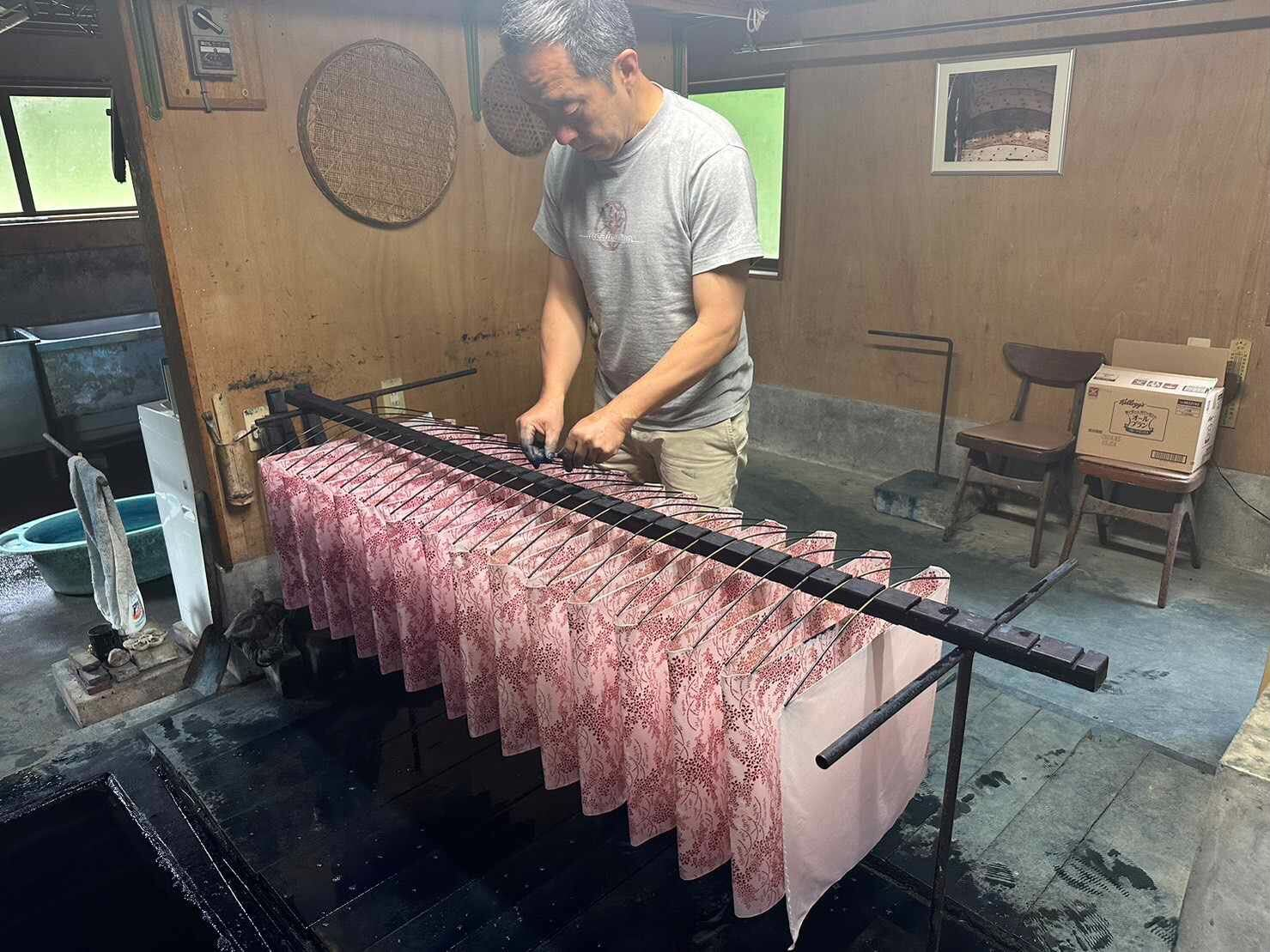
Resist-prepared fabric ready to be lowered into the indigo vat.

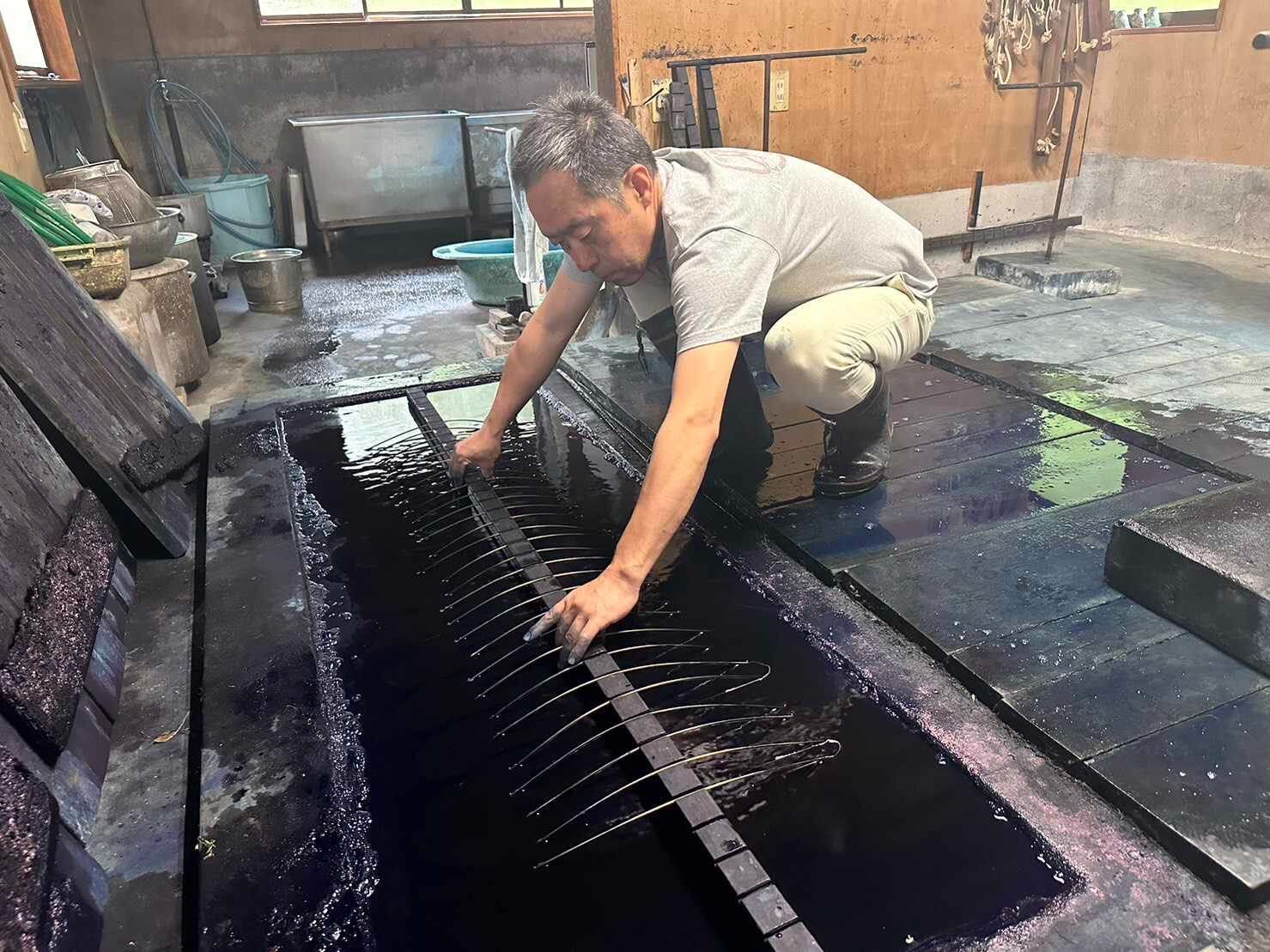
Matsubara Nobuo submerges fabric into the indigo vat.

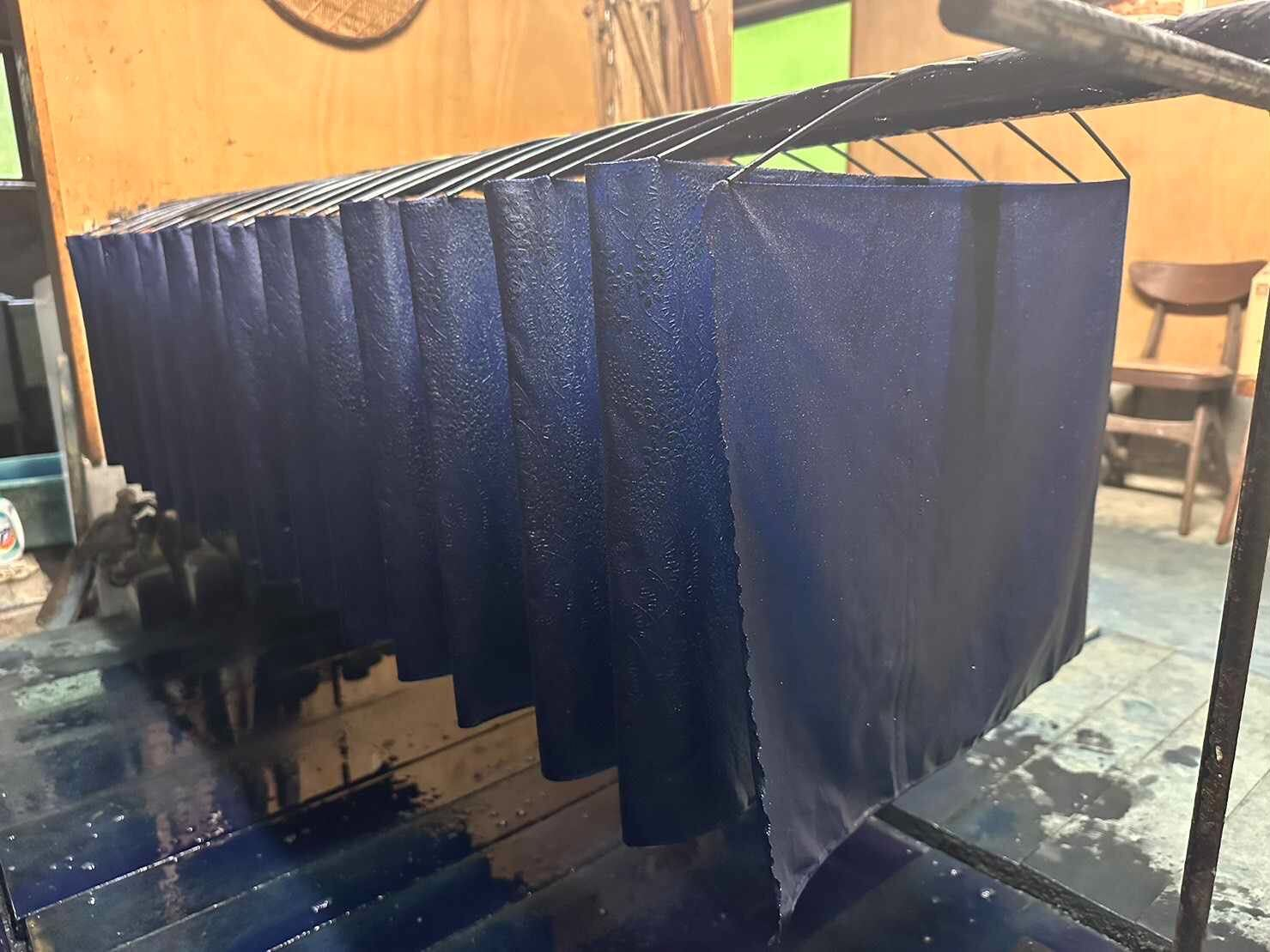
Indigo dyed fabric is raised from the dye vat.

== Style ==
The Nagaita-Chugata dyeing technique is typically used in the making of Yukata. Ise katagami, handcut paper stencils from the Mie Prefecture are used to apply resist paste to both sides of the kimono cloth. This technique was common until the last century where a cheaper technique called chusen became popular to dye fabric on both sides. Matubara mainly uses real indigo to dye his kimonos.

== Collections ==
Matsubara's work is held in the permanent collection of the Nelson-Atkins Museum of Art.

Work by Matsubara was purchased by Agency for Cultural Affairs as part of a collection of Cultural Properties of Japan.

== Awards and honors ==
- 2014, Matsubara was awarded with the Takamatsu-no-miya Memorial Award at the 61st Japan Traditional Crafts Exhibition. This is the highest award for an artist in the exhibition.
- 2015, Matsubara was awarded the Nihon Keizai Shimbun Award at the 49th Japan Traditional Crafts Dyeing Exhibition.
- 2017, Matsubara was honored and certified as a holder of the Intangible Cultural Property "Nagaita Chugata" of Chiba Prefecture.
- 2023, Matsubara was awarded the MOA Museum Award at the 57th Japan Kōgei Association Exhibition.
- 2023, Matsubara was named a Living National Treasure in 2023.
