= Nishijin-ori =

Traditional textiles produced in the Nishijin district of Kyoto

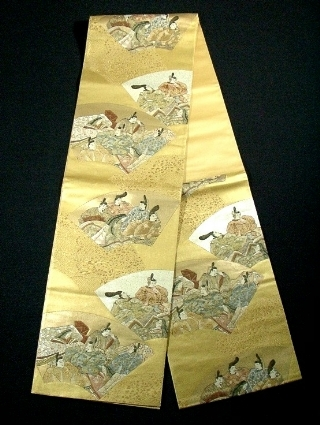
Nishijin-ori fukuro obi showing a woven scene with aristocrats

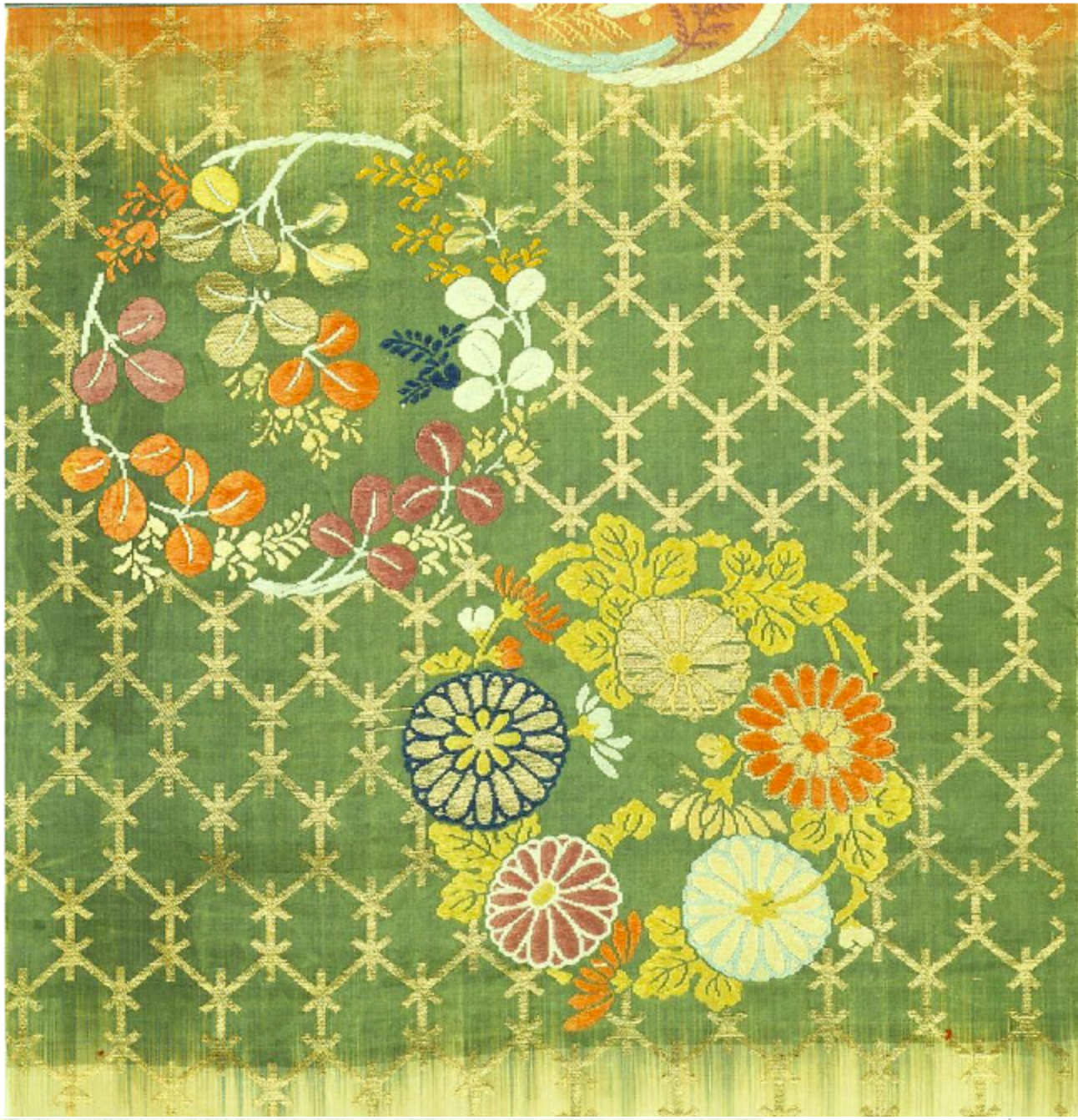
Detail of Nō robe from Nishijin, silk with gilded paper, Edo period

Nishijin-ori (西陣織, lit. 'Nishijin fabric') refers to traditional silk textiles produced in the Nishijin (西陣) district of Kamigyō-ku in Kyoto, Japan. The textiles can be woven using various techniques, such as tsumugi, kasuri, velvet, damask, brocade, and more. The term, therefore, refers to the place of origin, not a particular technique or pattern.

Originating in Heian-kyō (now Kyoto) over 1,200 years ago, Nishijin weaving is known for its highly decorative and finely woven designs, created through the use of tedious and specialised production processes. It is well-regarded for the high quality and craftsmanship of the resulting fabrics, commonly used for high-quality obi and kimono.

== History ==
In 794, Heian-kyō became the new capital city of Japan, with the Imperial Court and the aristocracy moving to the city as a result; due to this, the production of nishijin-ori increased in order to supply the Court and the aristocracy.

Despite this, over time, the desire for nishijin-ori began to decrease, resulting in weavers skilled in the process of its production going into business on their own, rather than working for textile production businesses. The demand for the material continued to dwindle during the Muromachi period due to the Ōnin War (1467–1477); exacerbated by a string of internal conflict in Kyoto and drought over the following years, the majority of Kyoto was demolished, with the people of Kyoto fleeing to nearby towns for safety.

Following the end of the war in the 1480s, the residents of Kyoto returned home, establishing residence on the Western side of Kyoto; this area of settlement was named Nishijin, meaning 'Western position', after the land that the residents had settled on, which had been the location – literally, the Western position – occupied by the army of Yamana Sozen during the war. Another group established residence in the Northern portion of Kyoto, in the location of the modern-day Shinmachi district; this Northern group became known for producing nerinuki, a shimmering fabric made from raw silk and scoured silk that became essential to the tsujigahana fabric dyeing technique.

Following the end of the Ōnin War, nishijin-ori weaving began to thrive. The weaving community supplied materials for both the Imperial Courts and the samurai lords. This increased their productivity, leading to improvements in the production process and the ability to create new fabrics, such as the gold brocades and damask silks that had originated in Ming Dynasty China.

During the Edo period (1603–1836) nishijin-ori weaving continued to thrive, with many studying its production and passing down their trade through the generations of skilled professionals. In 1837, production came to a halt following the unavailability of materials due to crop failures, meaning that weavers were unable to produce the fabric; this was compounded upon by the move of Japan's capital to Tokyo in 1869, a series of events thought to be the end of the production of nishijin-ori. However, in 1872, the production of nishijin-ori began to flourish once again, following a trip by some weavers to Europe in order to learn from the European weaving trade. During this trip, the weavers learned new techniques from the people of Europe, and adapted to the use of European weaving methods and machinery, such as the production of the Jacquard loom and the flying shuttle. By 1898, the Nishijin textile trade was well developed and encompassed the technology shared by the Europeans. This marked a beginning of a new era of Nishijin weaving involving the use of new machinery in the Japanese trade.

== Nishijin-ori in the modern day ==
The production of nishijin-ori has continued its success into the modern day, with nishijin-ori worn frequently to traditional Japanese ceremonies such as weddings, where it may be used for the bride's kimono, displaying designs passed down through generations of Nishijin weavers. These traditional designs range from scenes of nature, different breeds of birds and several different types of flowers. Several other products, including kimono scarves, different types of kimono, belts, shawls and many different types of cloth and decorations that adorn the walls of Japanese homes are also made using Nishijin weaving.

Tatsumura Textile, located in Nishijin, is a center of nishijin-ori manufacturing today. Founded by Heizo Tatsumura I in the 19th century, it is renowned for making some of the most luxurious nishijin-ori obi, as well as having been responsible for the tutelage of well-known painters such as the late Inshō Dōmoto. The nishijin-ori produced by the company, intricately woven and occasionally three-dimensional in effect, can cost up to 1 million yen.

== See also ==
- Brocade
- Kyoto
- Kimono
- Shokuraku Asano

== Bibliography ==
- The history of Nishijin weaving
- Japan Atlas Traditional Crafts. N.d. Nishijin weaves. Retrieved from http://webjapan.org/atlas/crafts/craft_fr.html
- Kyoto City Web. 2004. Welcome to Kyoto. Retrieved from https://www.city.kyoto.jp/koho/eng/index.html
- Nishijin Textile Industrial Association. 2004. Kyoto Nishijin. Welcome to Nishijin Homepage. Retrieved from https://web.archive.org/web/20071007131329/http://www.nishijin.or.jp/eng/eng.htm
