= Ginza =

Shopping, business, and entertainment district in Chuo, Tokyo, Japan

Ginza 銀座
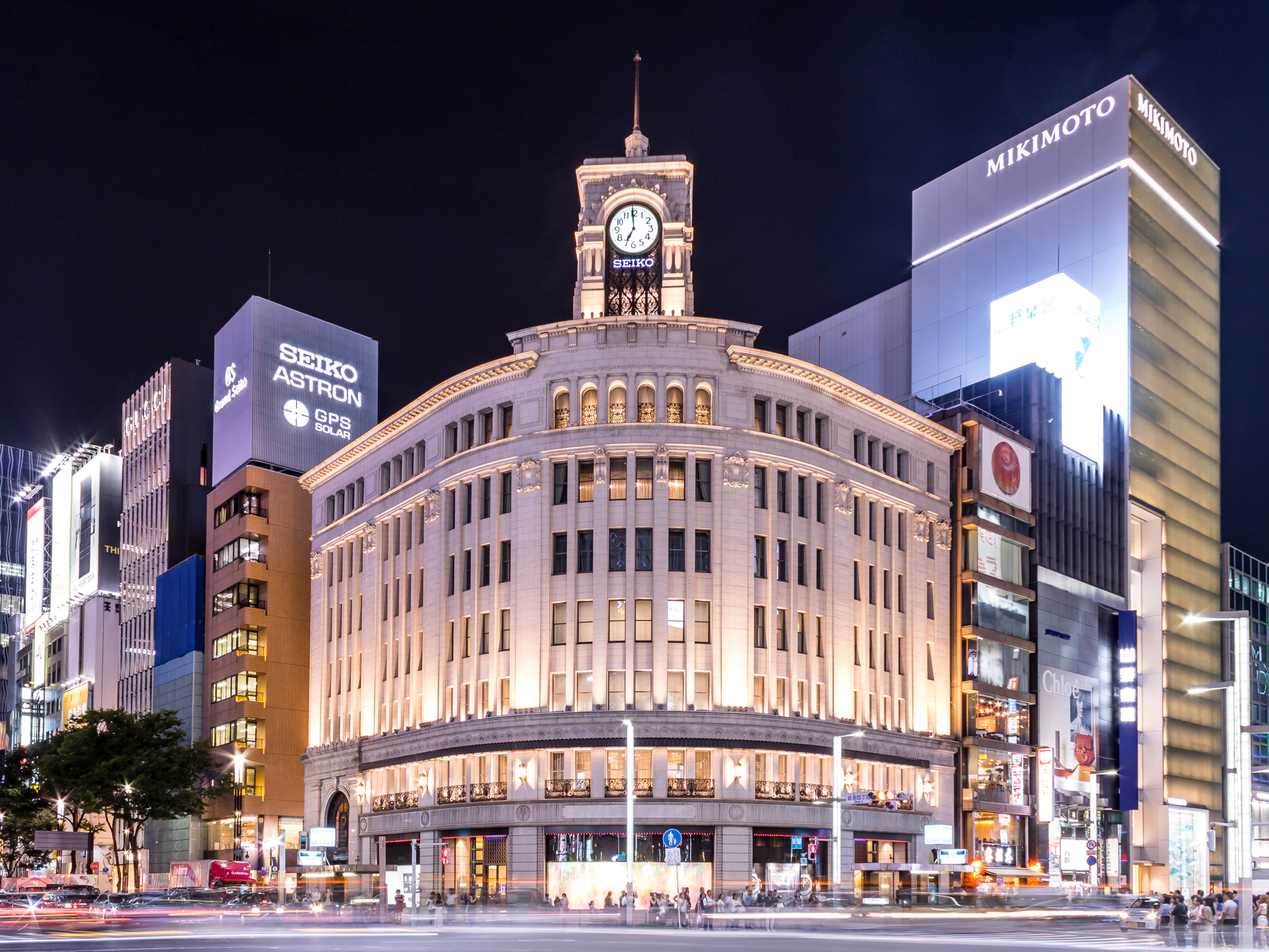
- Ginza's Wako store in 2018
- Interactive map of Ginza
- Coordinates: 35°40′16″N 139°45′54″E
- Country: Japan
- City: Tokyo
- Ward: Chūō

Ginza (/ˈɡɪnzə/ GHIN-zə; Japanese: 銀座 [ɡindza]) is a district of Chūō, Tokyo, located south of Yaesu and Kyōbashi, west of Tsukiji, east of Yūrakuchō and Uchisaiwaichō, and north of Shinbashi. It is a popular upscale shopping area of Tokyo, with numerous internationally renowned department stores, boutiques, restaurants and coffeehouses located in the vicinity.

Ginza was a part of the old Kyobashi ward of Tokyo City, which, together with Nihonbashi and Kanda, formed the core of Shitamachi, the original downtown center of Edo (Tokyo).

== History ==
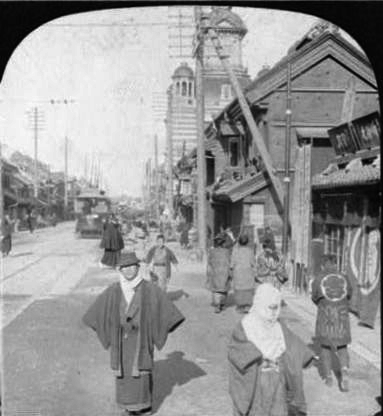
Ginza in 1903, photographed by William H. Rau

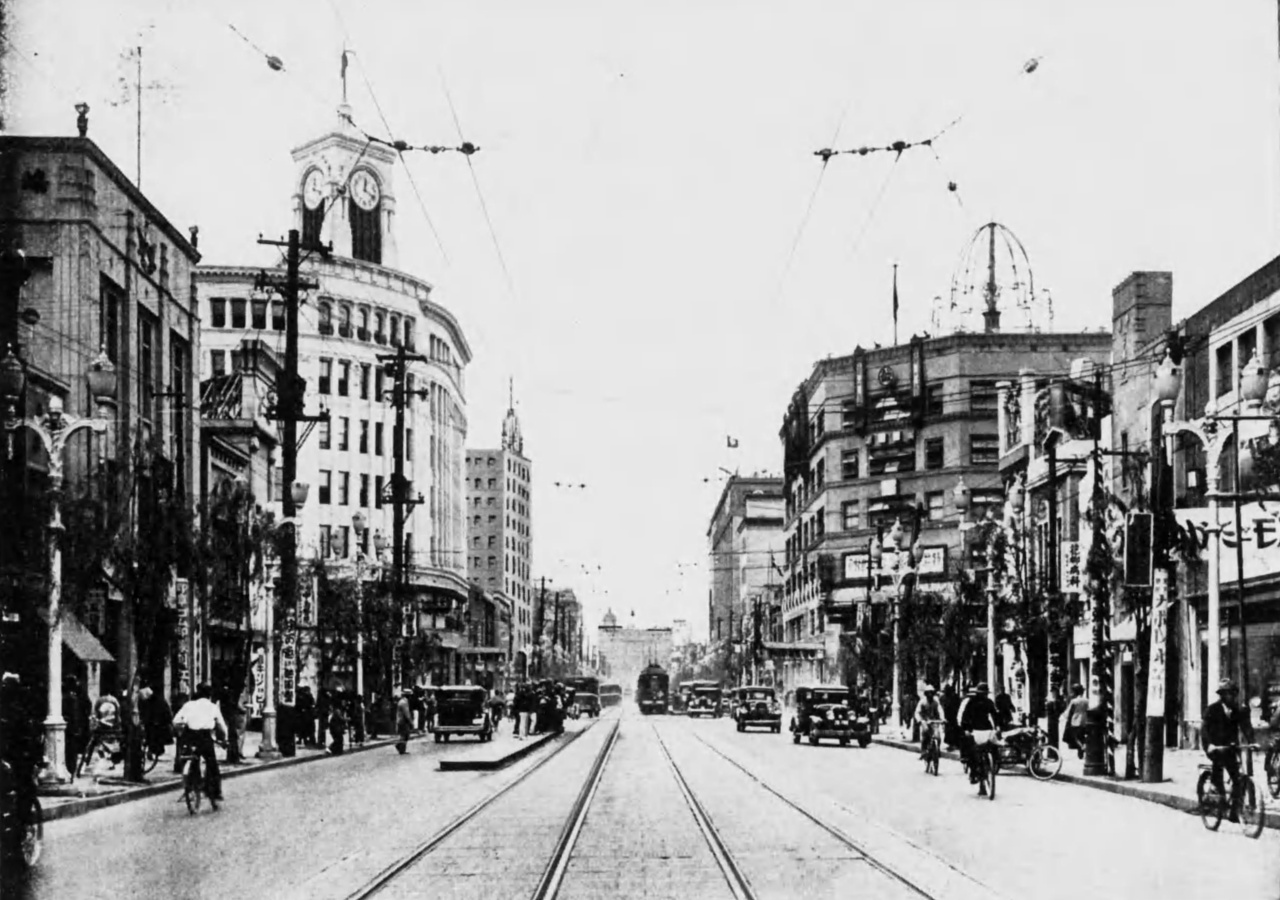
Ginza in 1936 with the Wako store

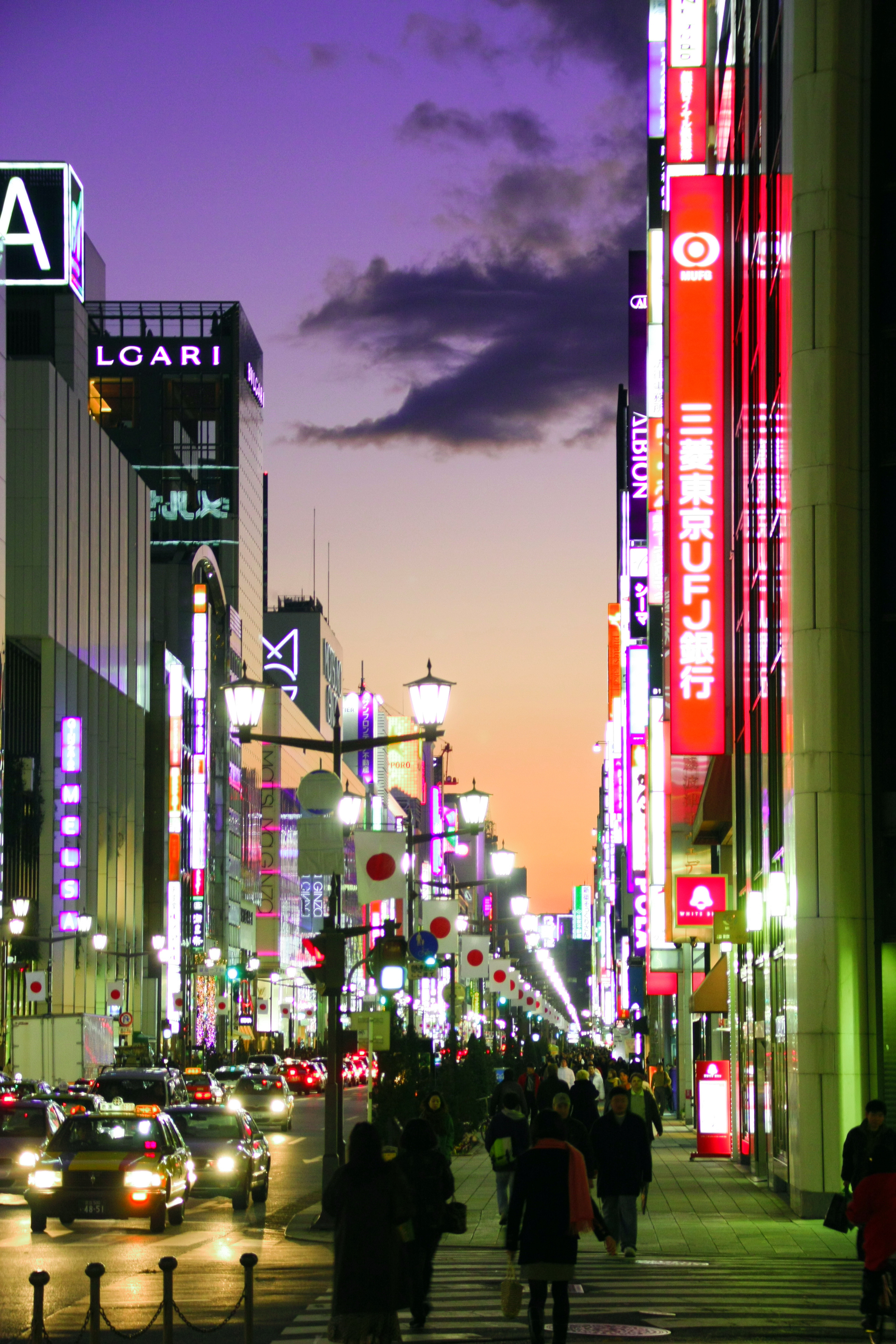
Ginza in 2007

Ginza was built upon a former swamp that was filled in during the 16th century. The name Ginza came after the establishment of a silver-coin mint established there in 1612, during the Edo period.

After a devastating fire in 1872 burned down most of the area, the Meiji government designated the Ginza area as a "model of modernization." The government planned the construction of fireproof brick buildings and larger, better streets connecting Shimbashi Station all the way to the foreign concession in Tsukiji.

Soon after the fire, redevelopment schemes were prepared by Colin Alexander McVean a chief surveyor of the Public Works under direction of Yamao Yozo, but execution designs were provided by the Irish-born engineer Thomas Waters; the Bureau of Construction of the Ministry of Finance was in charge of construction. The following year, a Western-style shopping promenade on the street from the Shinbashi bridge to the Kyōbashi bridge in the southwestern part of Chūō with two- and three-story Georgian brick buildings was completed.

These "bricktown" buildings were initially offered for sale and later were leased, but the high rent prevented many of them from being occupied long term. Moreover, the construction was not adapted to the climate, and the bold design conflicted with traditional Japanese architectural styles found at the time. The new Ginza was not popular with visiting foreigners, who were looking for a more Edo-styled city. Isabella Bird visited in 1878 and in 1880 implied that Ginza was less like an Oriental city than like the outskirts of Chicago or Melbourne. Philip Terry, an English writer of tour guides, likened it to Broadway, albeit not in a positive sense.

Nevertheless, the area flourished as a symbol of "civilization and enlightenment" thanks to the presence of various newspapers and magazine companies, which helped spread the latest trends of the day. The area was also known for its window displays, an example of modern marketing techniques. The area became a popular shopping and meeting destination, with the custom of "killing time in Ginza" developing strongly between the two world wars.

Most of these European-style buildings have disappeared, but some older buildings still remain, most famously the Wakō building with the now-iconic Hattori Clock Tower. The building and the clock tower were originally built by Kintarō Hattori, the founder of Seiko.

Its recent history has seen it as a prominent outpost of Western luxury shops such as Louis Vuitton and Giorgio Armani. Ginza is a popular destination on weekends, as the main north–south artery has been closed to traffic since the 1960s, under governor Ryokichi Minobe.

== Economy ==
Many leading fashion houses' flagship stores are located here, with the area having the highest concentration of Western shops in Tokyo. It is one of two locations in Tokyo considered by Chevalier and Mazzalovo to be the best locations for a luxury goods store. Prominent high-end retailers include the American company Carolina Herrera New York, French companies Chanel, Dior, Louis Vuitton and Saint Laurent, Italian company Gucci and Austrian brands Swarovski and Riedel.

Ginza is also home to many kimono stores, including Ginza Motoji, Echigo-ya, and Erizen. Many people choose to wear their kimono to visit Ginza and window shop.

Flagship electronic retail stores like the Sony showroom (which closed in 2017 and new building would open in 2022) and the first Apple Store outside the United States can be found here (Ginza 2 chome). The electronics company Ricoh is headquartered in the Ricoh Building in Ginza. The neighborhood is a major shopping district. It is home to Wako department store, which is located in a building dating from 1894. The building has a clock tower. There are many department stores in the area, including Hankyu, Seibu, and Matsuya, in which there are many shops: grocery stores, restaurants, women and men clothes, sportswear, and jewellers, etc. There are also art galleries. Kabuki-za is the theater for kabuki, and is located between Ginza and Tsukiji. The building was first opened in 1889 and has been reconstructed several times due to wartime damage and fire. The present building was built in 2013.

Sukiyabashi Jiro (すきやばし次郎, Sukiyabashi Jirō) is a sushi restaurant in Ginza which is owned and operated by sushi master Jiro Ono. It was the first sushi restaurant in the world to receive three stars from the Michelin Guide, although it was removed from the Michelin Guide in November 2019 because it does not accept reservations from the general public.

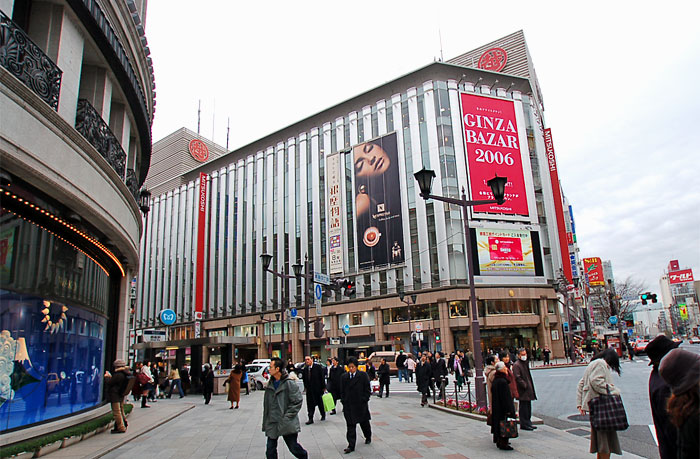
Mitsukoshi department store at Ginza. There are two symbols of lion heads at the entrance, which is a popular meeting place.

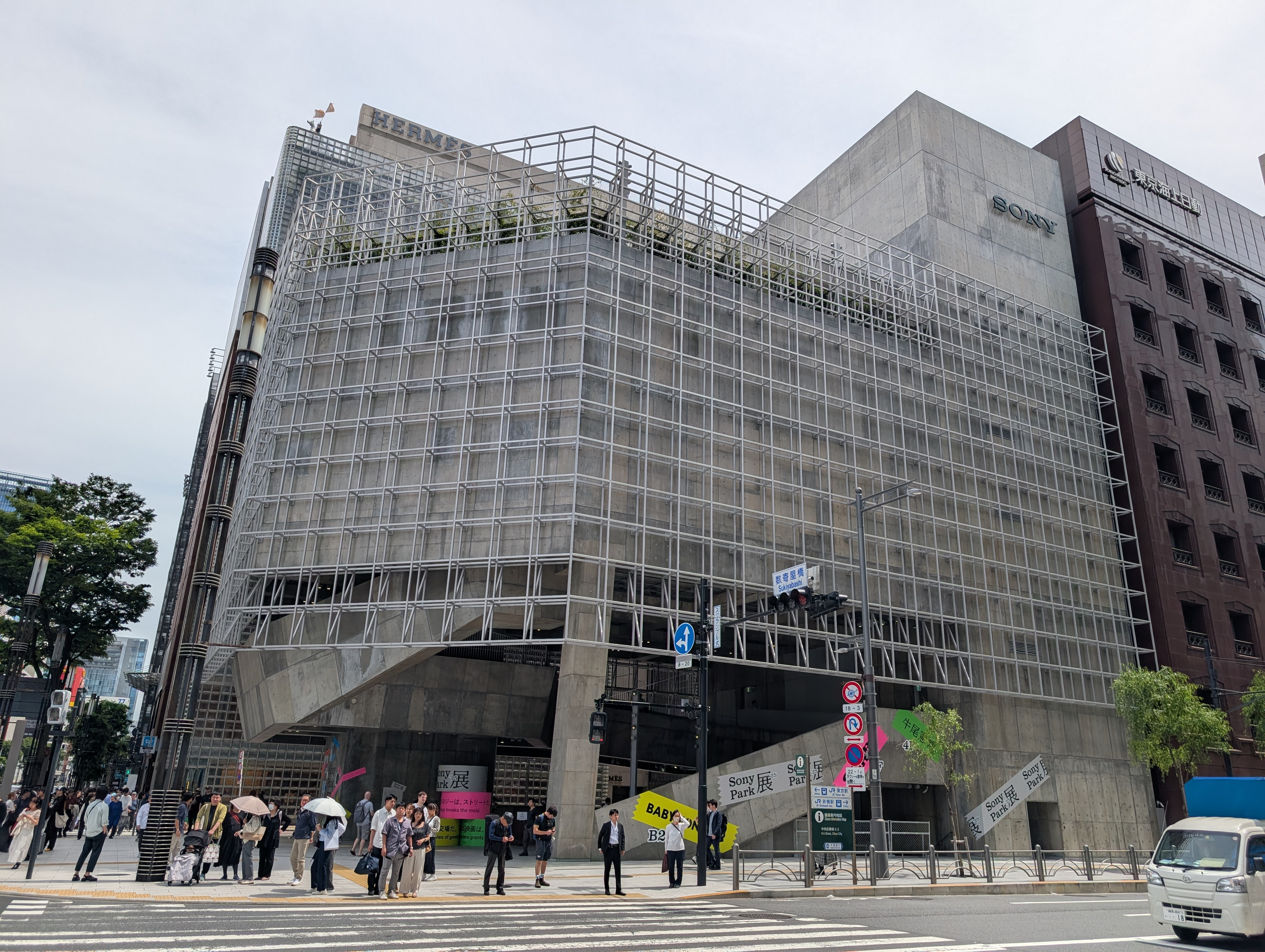
Ginza Sony Park

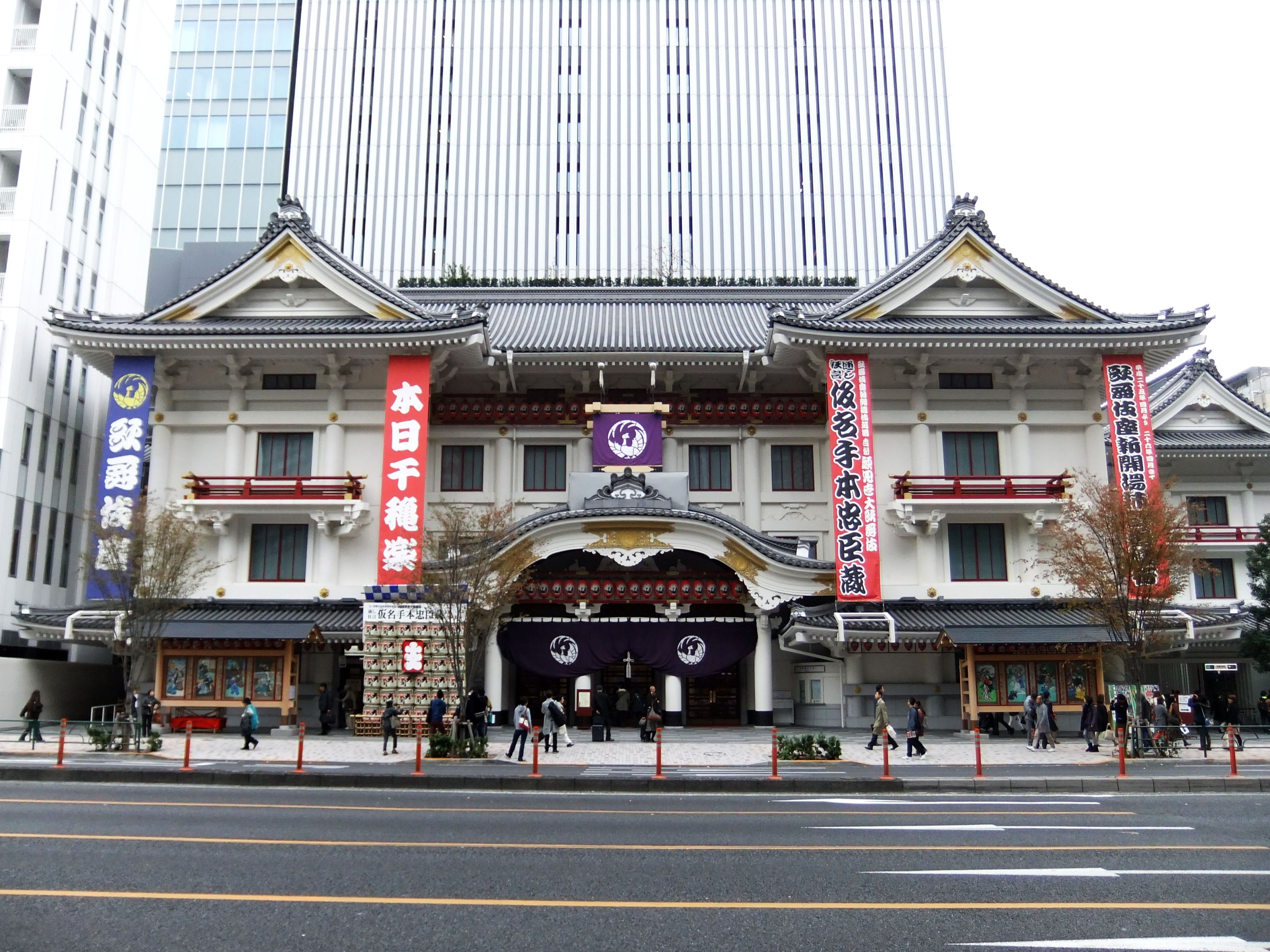
Kabuki-za theater is located between Ginza and Tsukiji, about a 15-minute walk away from the Mitsukoshi store.

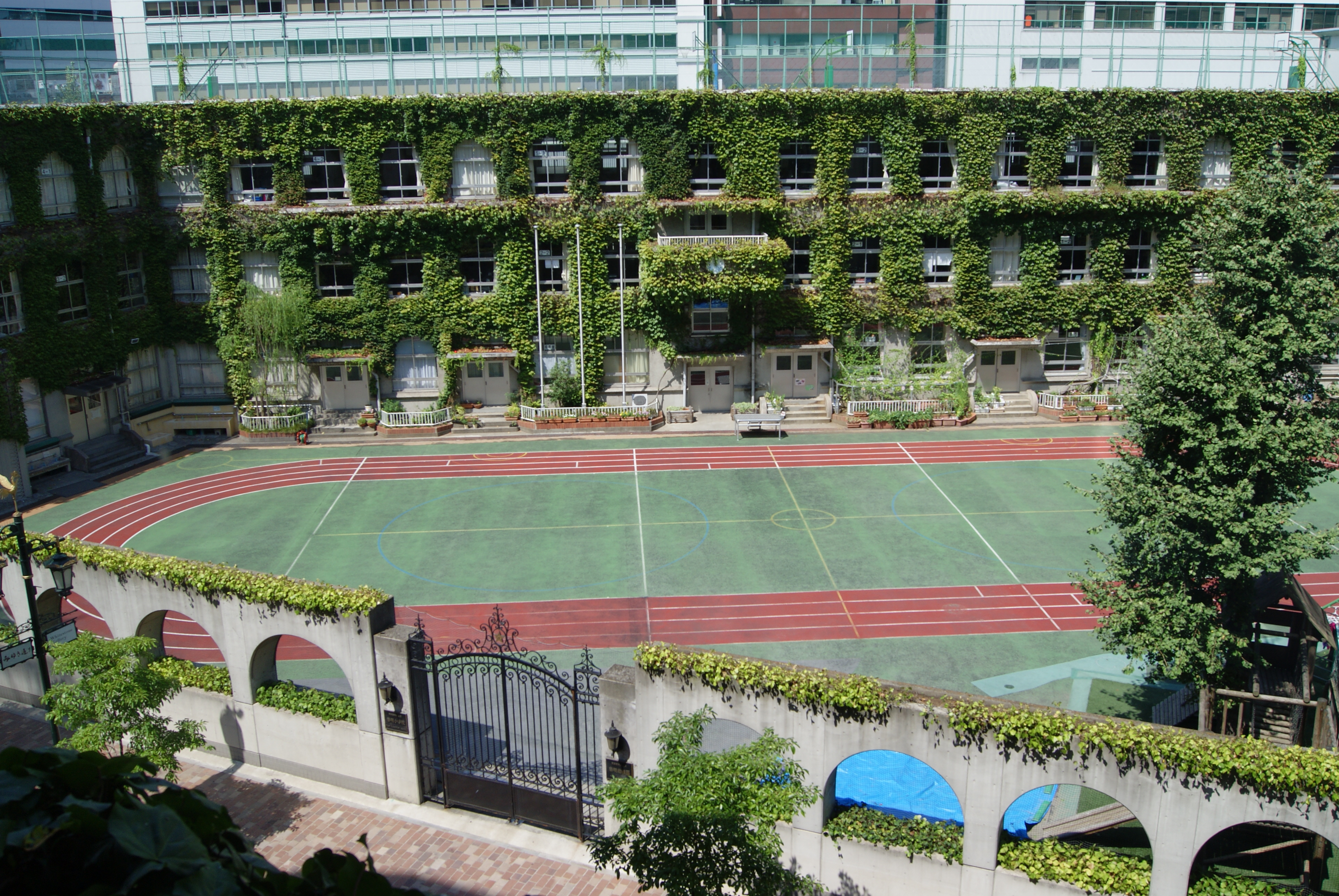
Taimei Elementary School

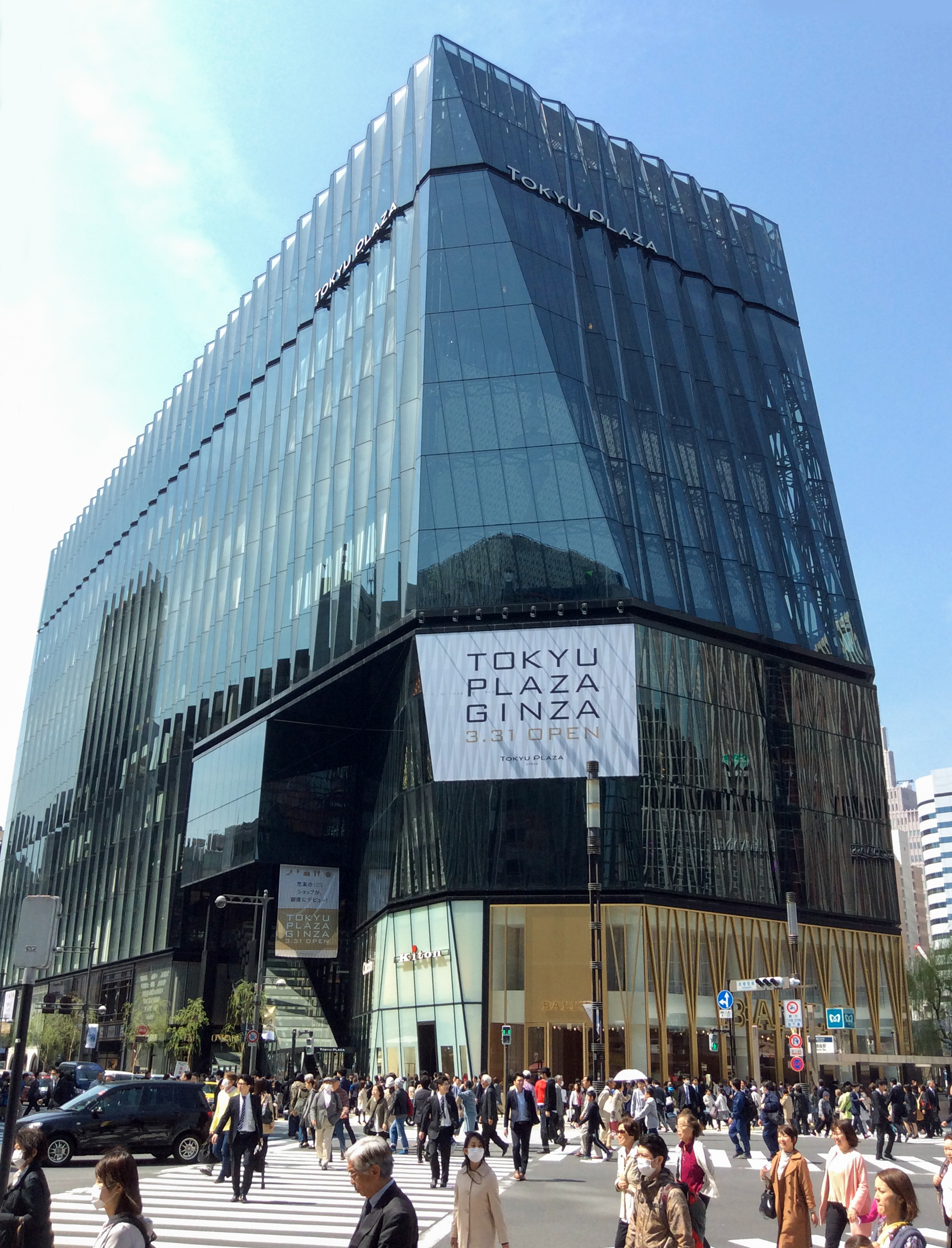
Tokyu Plaza Ginza, a shopping center with a duty-free shop for visitors from other countries

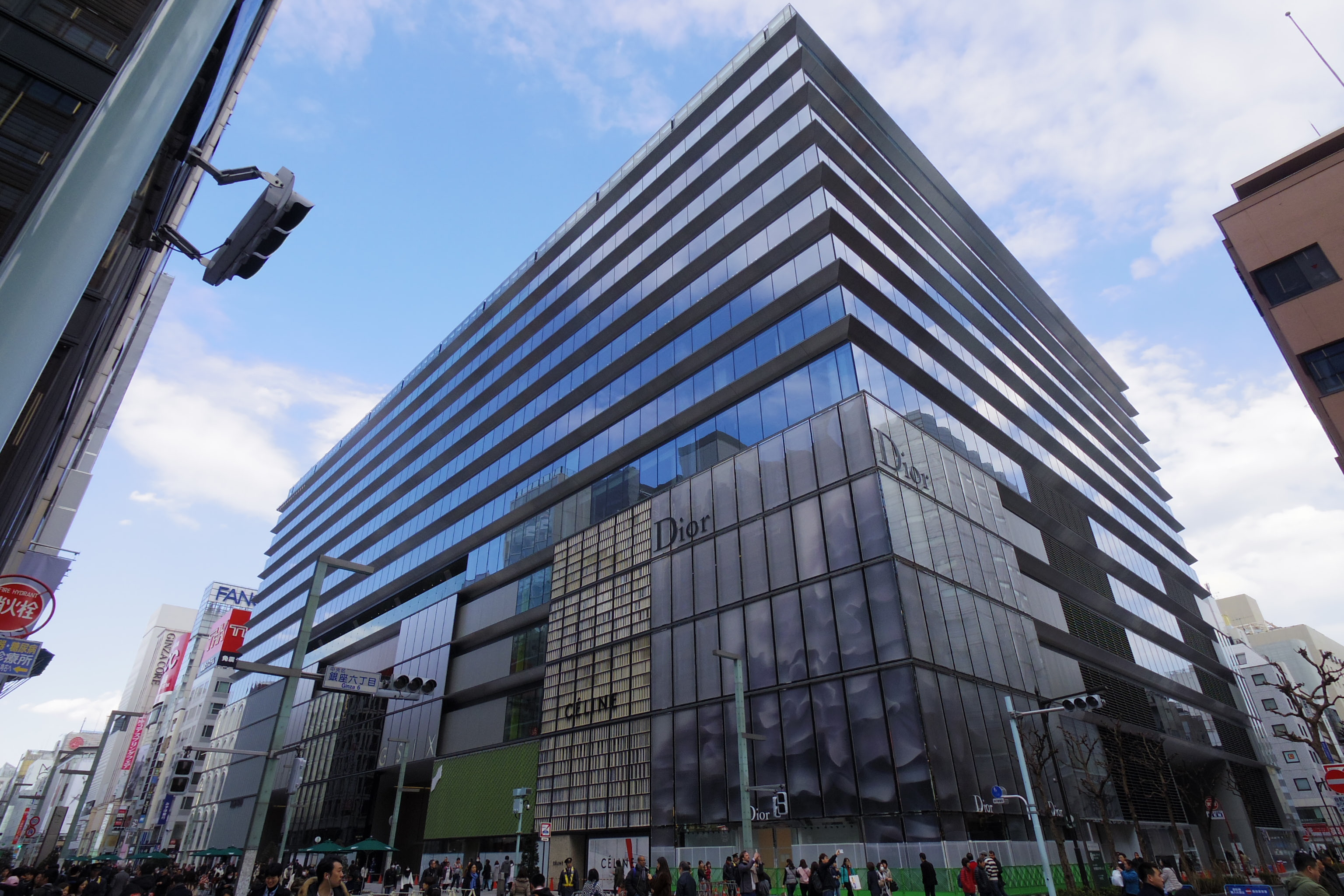
Ginza Six shopping complex, the newest shopping center in Ginza. Dior Cafe is located in this building.

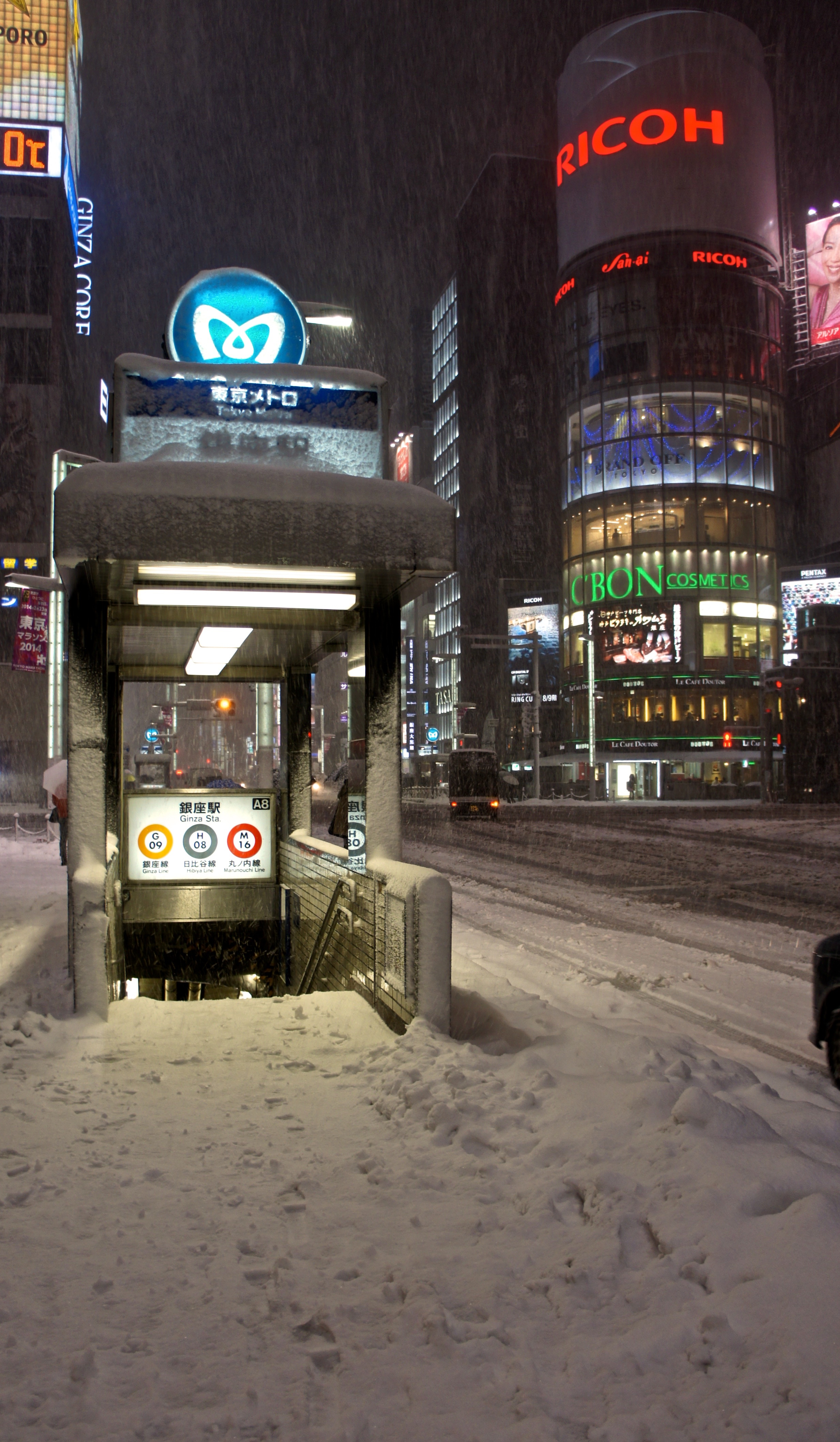
Ginza in Snow

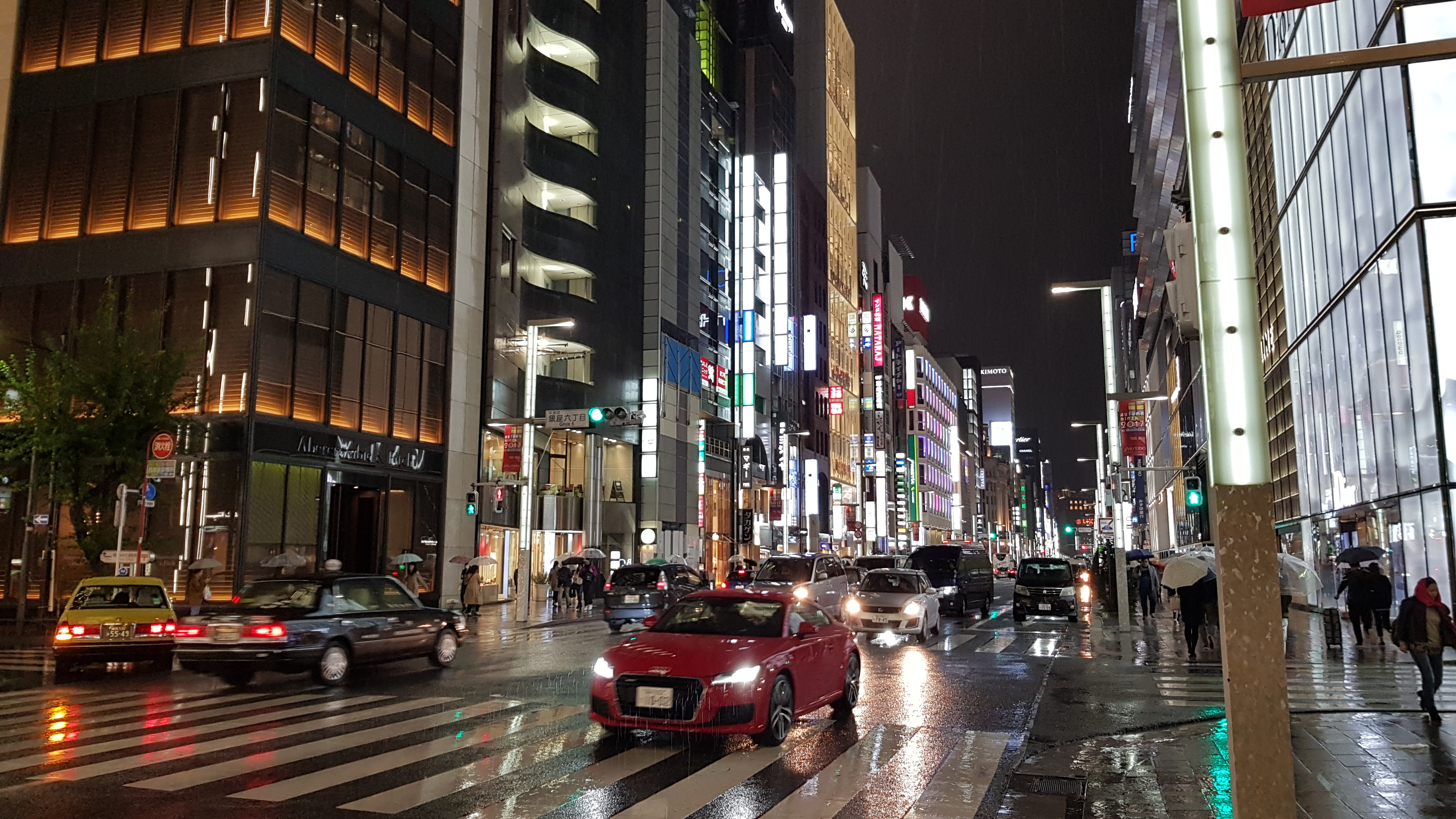
Ginza at night

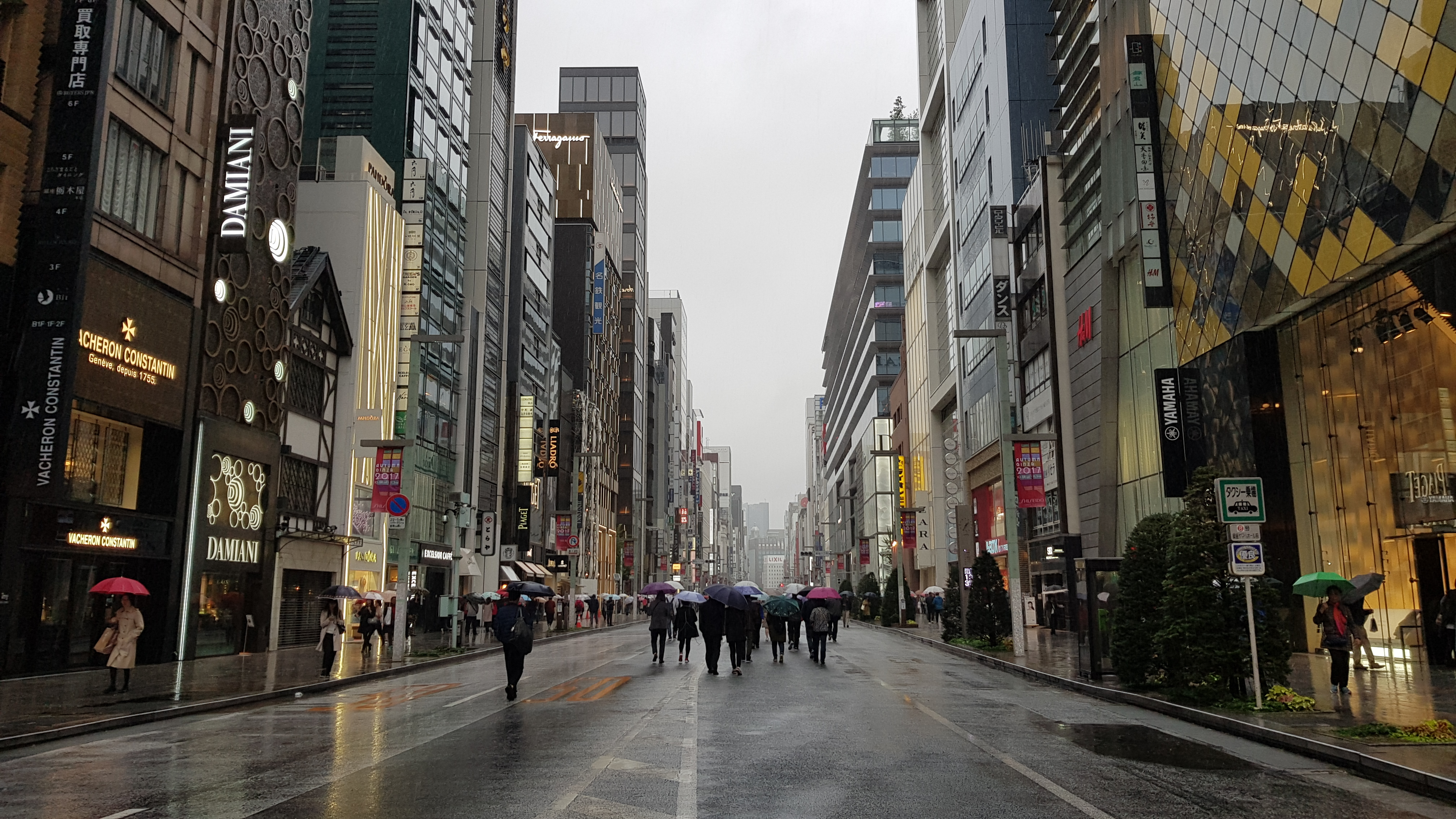
Ginza in the rain

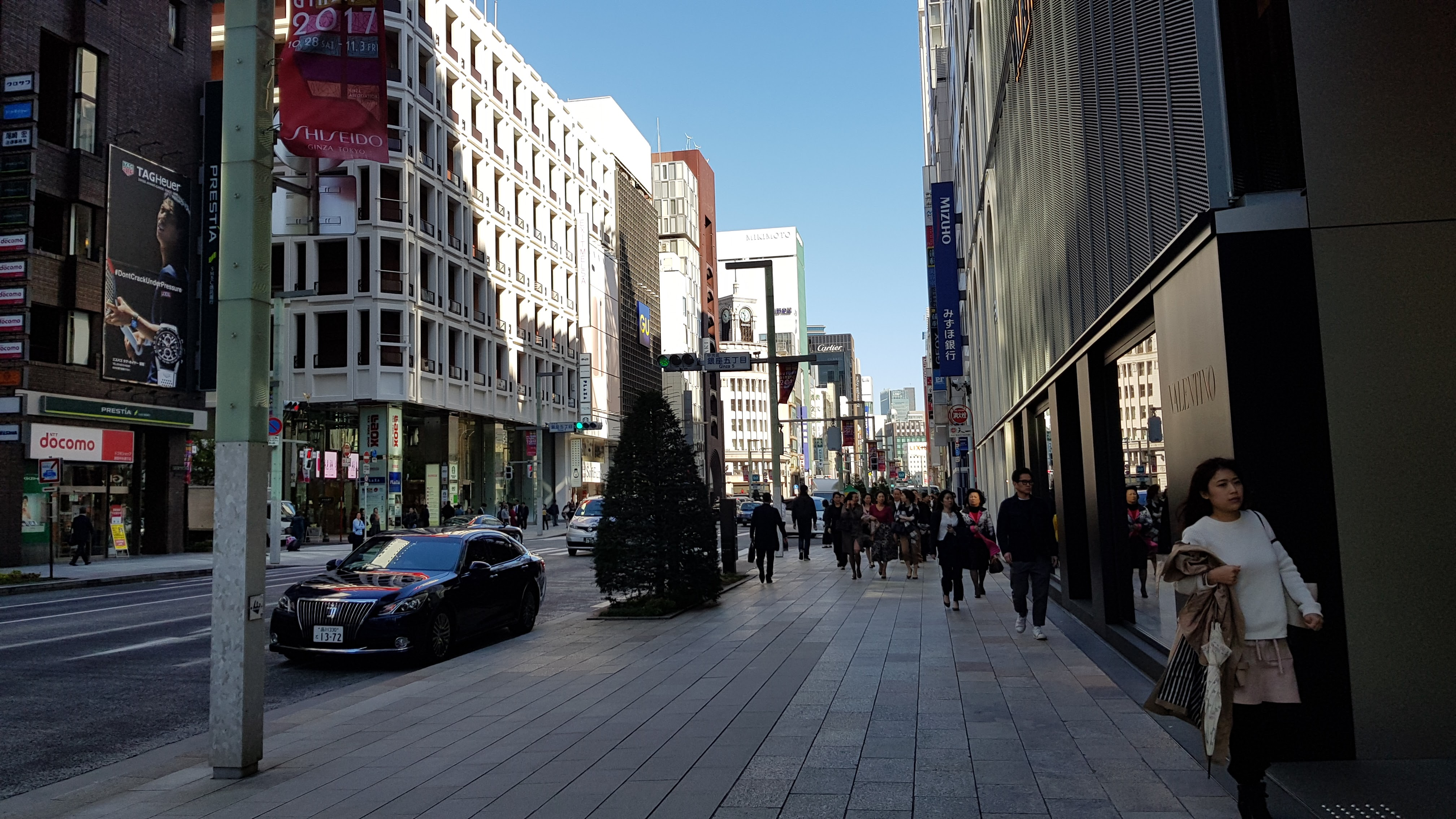
Ginza in afternoon

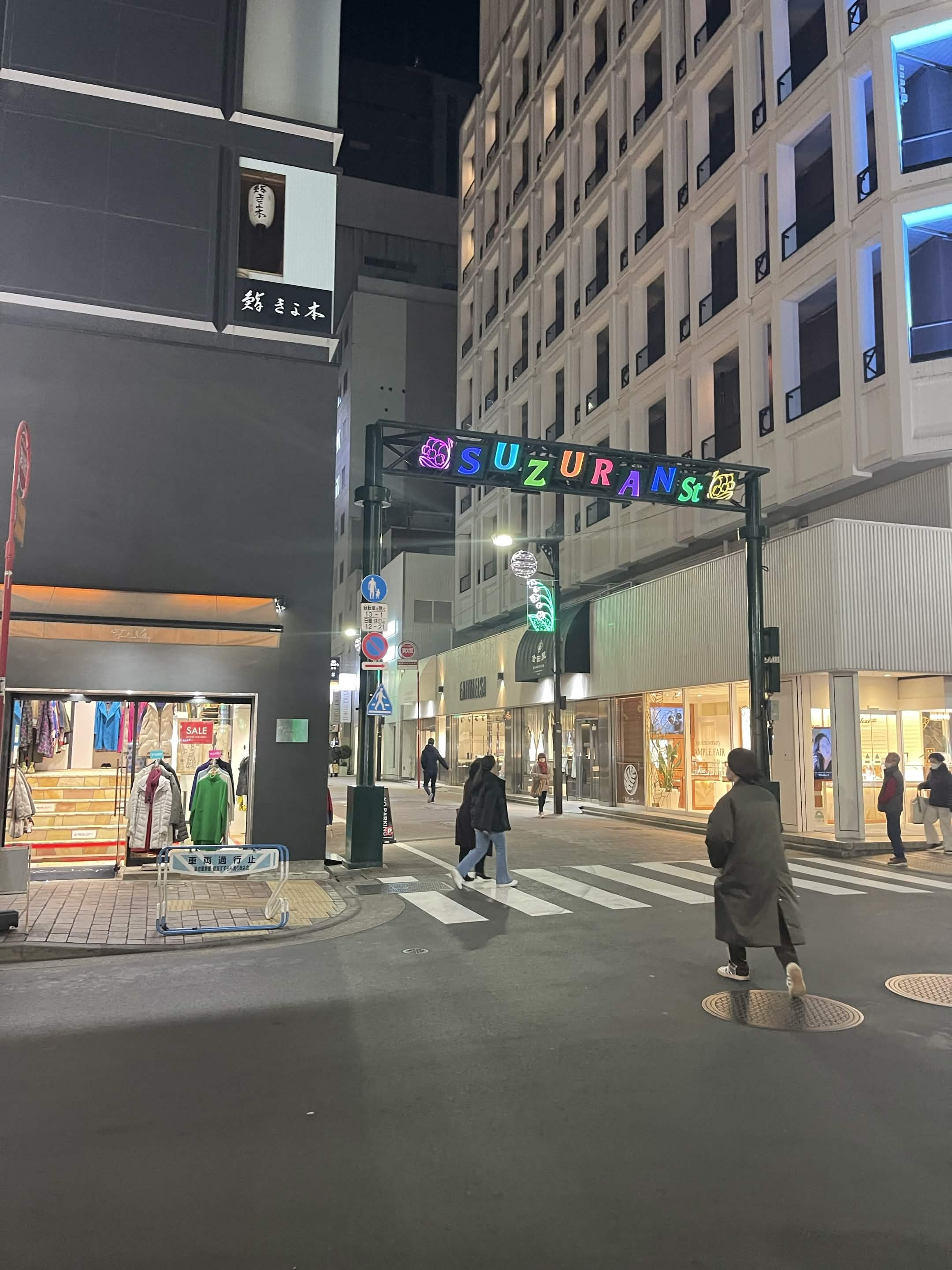
An image of Suzuran Street in the Ginza district of Tokyo, Japan.

== Pedestrianization ==
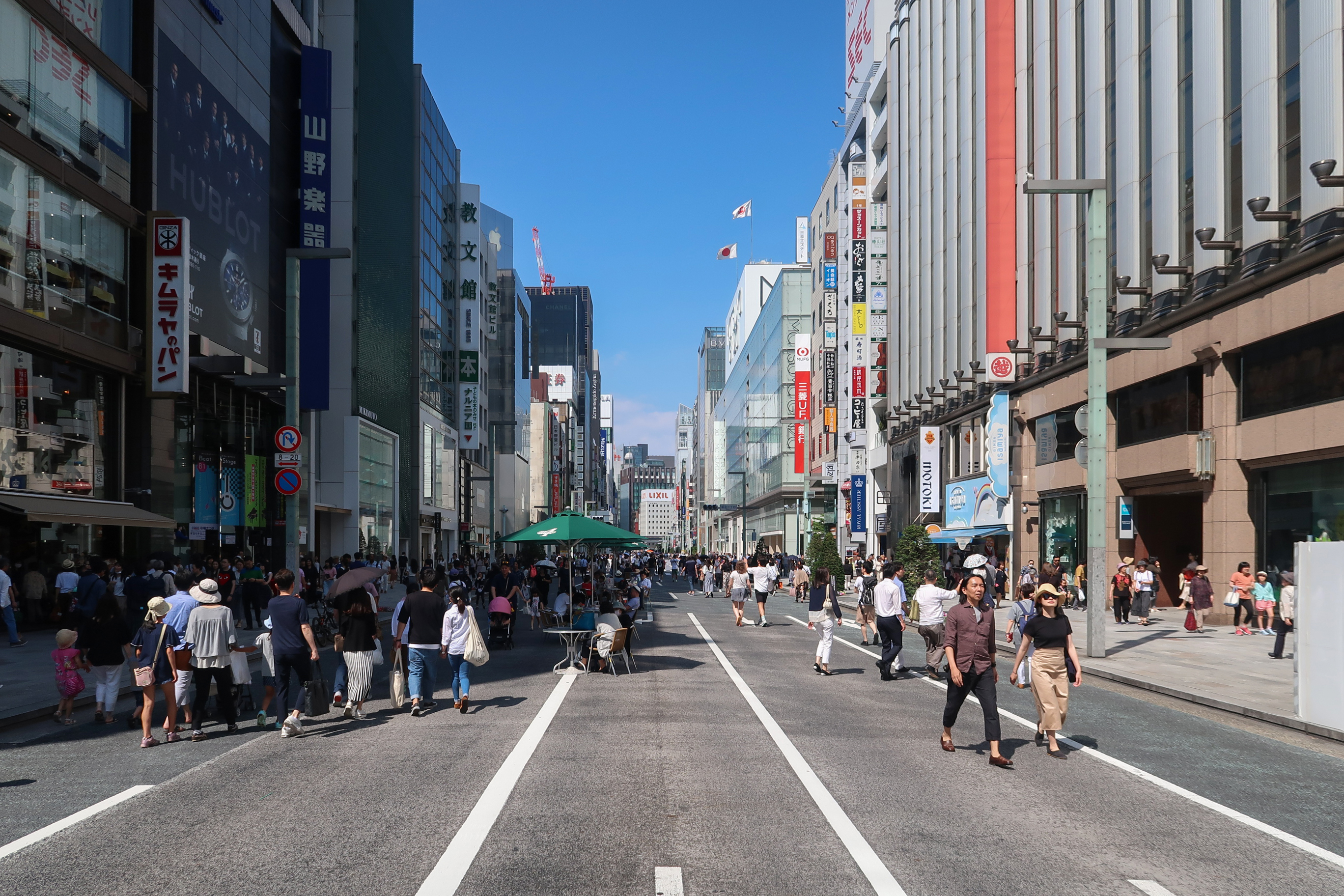
Ginza during the weekend Hokōsha Tengoku event

Each Saturday and Sunday, from 12:00 p.m. until 5:00 p.m., Chuo-Dori Street through Ginza is closed to road traffic, allowing people to walk freely. This is called Hokōsha Tengoku (歩行者天国) or Hokoten for short, literally meaning "pedestrian heaven". During this time, street performances often take place, including music and magic tricks. As a famous photo spot, some cats sleep on signs, where people can put their own cats onto these signs. The location where cats are varies depending on the date.

== Subway stations ==
- Ginza Station (銀座駅) (Tokyo Metro Hibiya Line, Tokyo Metro Ginza Line, Tokyo Metro Marunouchi Line)
- Ginza-itchōme Station (銀座一丁目駅) (Tokyo Metro Yūrakuchō Line)
- Higashi-Ginza Station (東銀座駅) (Tokyo Metro Hibiya Line, Toei Asakusa Line)

Other stations near Ginza:

- Yūrakuchō Station (有楽町駅) Tokyo Metro Yūrakuchō Line, JR Yamanote line, JR Keihin–Tōhoku line
- Hibiya Station (日比谷駅) Tokyo Metro Hibiya line, Tokyo Metro Chiyoda Line, Toei Mita Line
- Shimbashi Station (新橋駅) Tokyo Metro Ginza Line, Toei Asakusa Line, JR Yamanote Line, JR Keihin–Tōhoku Line

Ginza Station, Yūrakuchō Station, and Hibiya Station are connected underground.

== Education ==
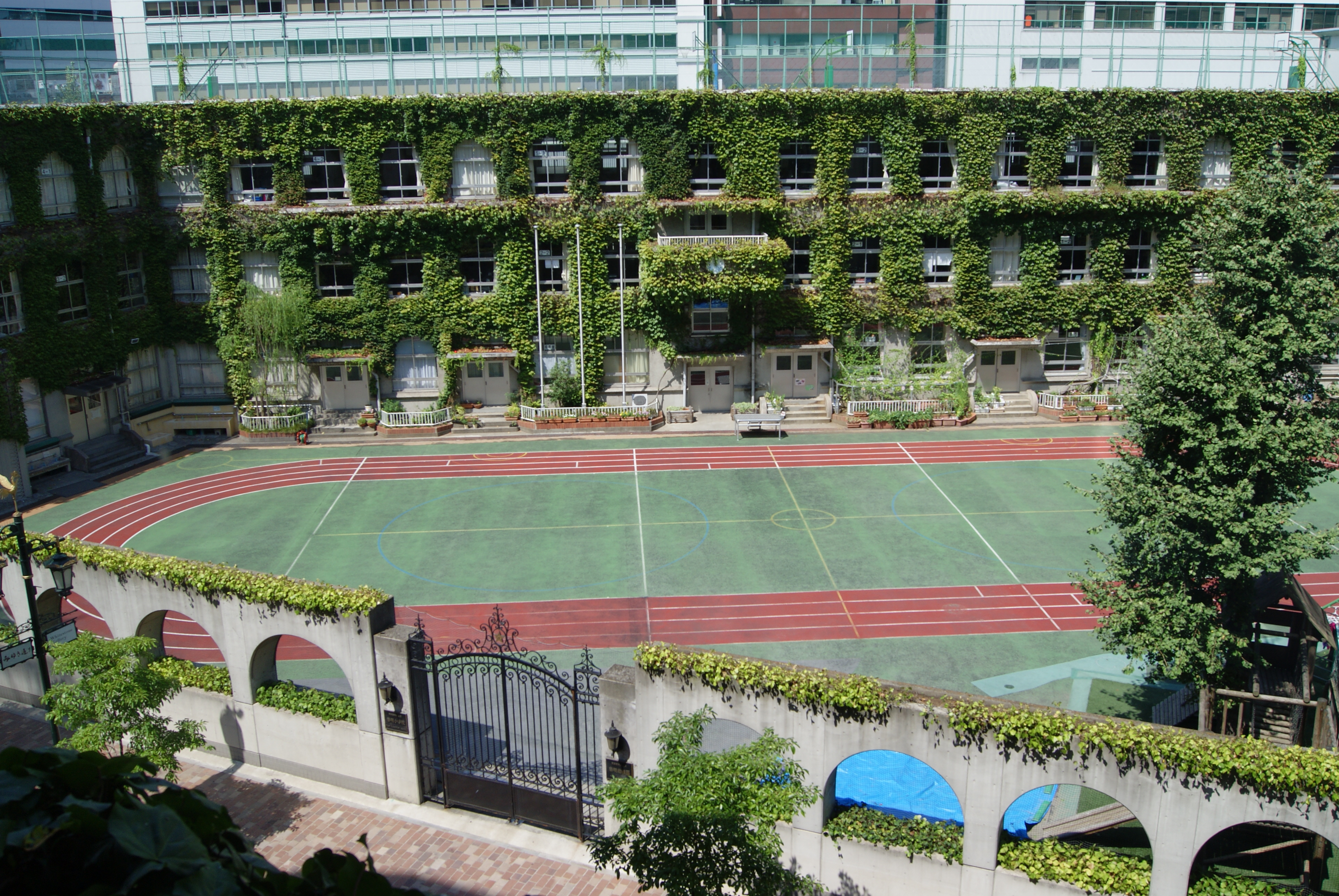
Taimei Elementary School

Public elementary and junior high schools are operated by Chuo City Board of Education.

Zoned elementary schools include the following:

- Taimei Elementary School: All of 5-8 chome, 1-chome (2-10 ban, and two lots of 11-ban), 2-chome (2-9 ban), 3-chome (2-8 ban), and 4-chome (1-8 ban)
- Kyobashi Tsukiji Elementary School (中央区立京橋築地小学校) - 1-chome (12-28 ban and one lot in 11-ban), 2-chome (10-16 ban), 3-chome (9-15 ban), and 4-chome (9-14 ban)

All of Ginza is zoned to Ginza Junior High School (中央区立銀座中学校).

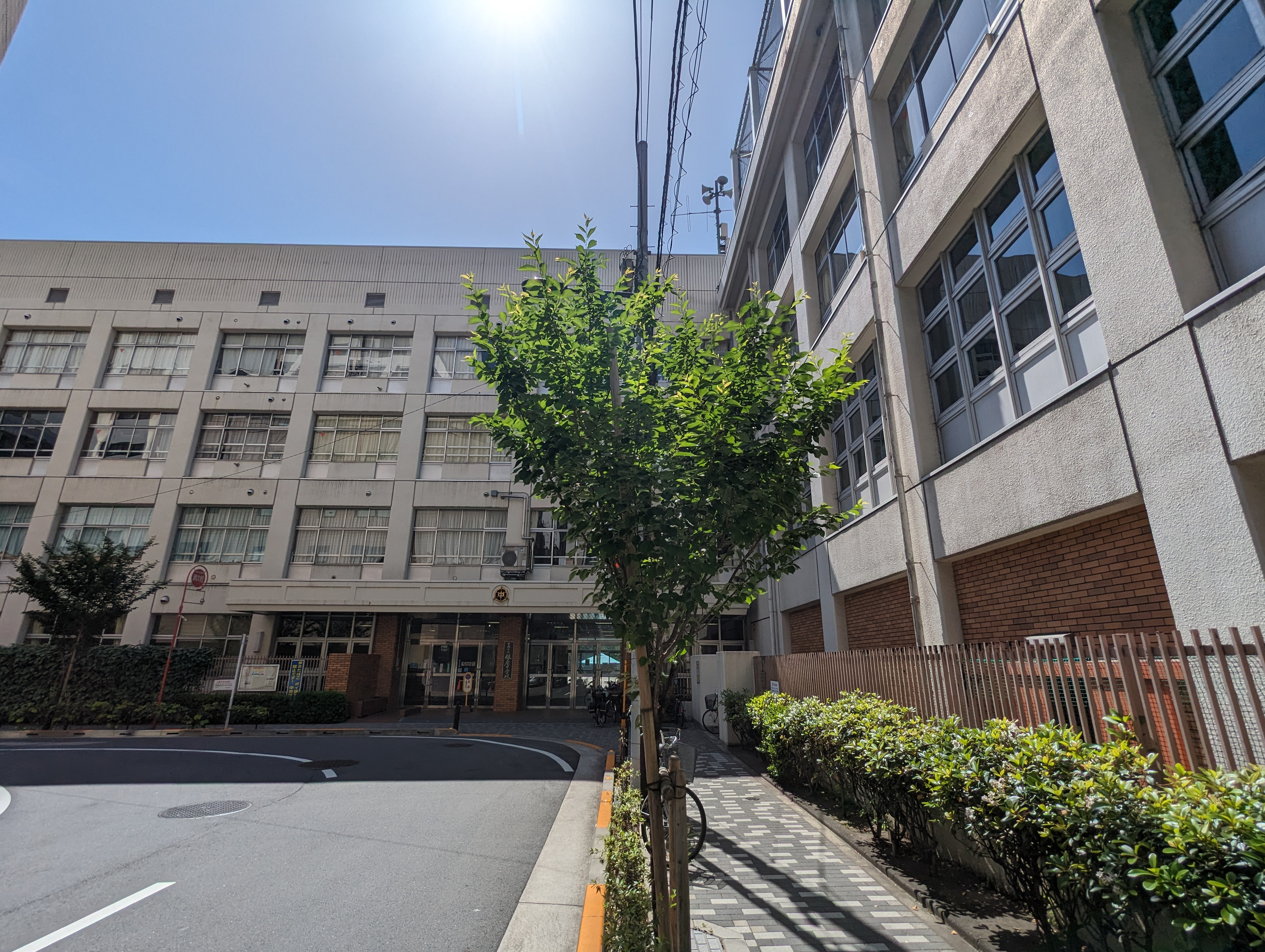
Ginza Junior High School (中央区立銀座中学校)

== See also ==
- Asakusa
- Omotesando
- List of upscale shopping districts
- Tourism in Japan
