= Yanagi (surname) =

Yanagi (written: 柳) is a Japanese surname. Notable people with the surname include:

- Eijirō Yanagi (柳 永二郎; 1895–1984), Japanese actor
- Keishiro Yanagi (born 1941), Japanese tennis player
- Koji Yanagi (柳 広司; born 1967), Japanese writer
- Kotaro Yanagi (柳 浩太郎; born 1985), Japanese actor
- Masako Yanagi (柳 昌子; born 1959), Japanese tennis player
- Miki Yanagi (柳 美稀; born 1997), Japanese actress and model
- Miwa Yanagi (やなぎ みわ; born 1967), Japanese photographer
- Nagi Yanagi (やなぎ なぎ; born 1987), Japanese singer
- Naoki Yanagi (矢薙 直樹; born 1972), Japanese voice actor
- Yanagi Narayoshi (柳 楢悦; 1832–1891), Japanese mathematician, hydrographer, politician
- Shinya Yanagi (柳 晋哉; born 1987), Japanese artisan
- Yanagi Sōetsu (柳 宗悦; 1889–1961), Japanese art critic and philosopher
- Sori Yanagi (柳 宗理; 1915–2011), Japanese industrial designer
- Takahiro Yanagi (柳 貴博; born 1997), Japanese footballer
- Takayuki Yanagi (柳 喬之; born 1990), Japanese actor and model
- Takehiko Yanagi (柳 武彦; 1916–unknown), Japanese field hockey player
- Yasutaka Yanagi (柳 育崇; born 1994), Japanese footballer
- Yukinori Yanagi (柳 幸典; born 1959), Japanese contemporary artist
- Yūrei Yanagi (柳 憂怜; born 1963), Japanese actor
- Yusuke Yanagi (栁 雄介; born 1955), Japanese virologist
- Yutaro Yanagi (柳 雄太郎; born 1995), Japanese footballer
- Yūya Yanagi (柳 裕也; born 1994), Japanese baseball player
