= Chōsen Folk Art Museum =

1924–1945 museum in colonial Korea

- 朝鮮民族美術館
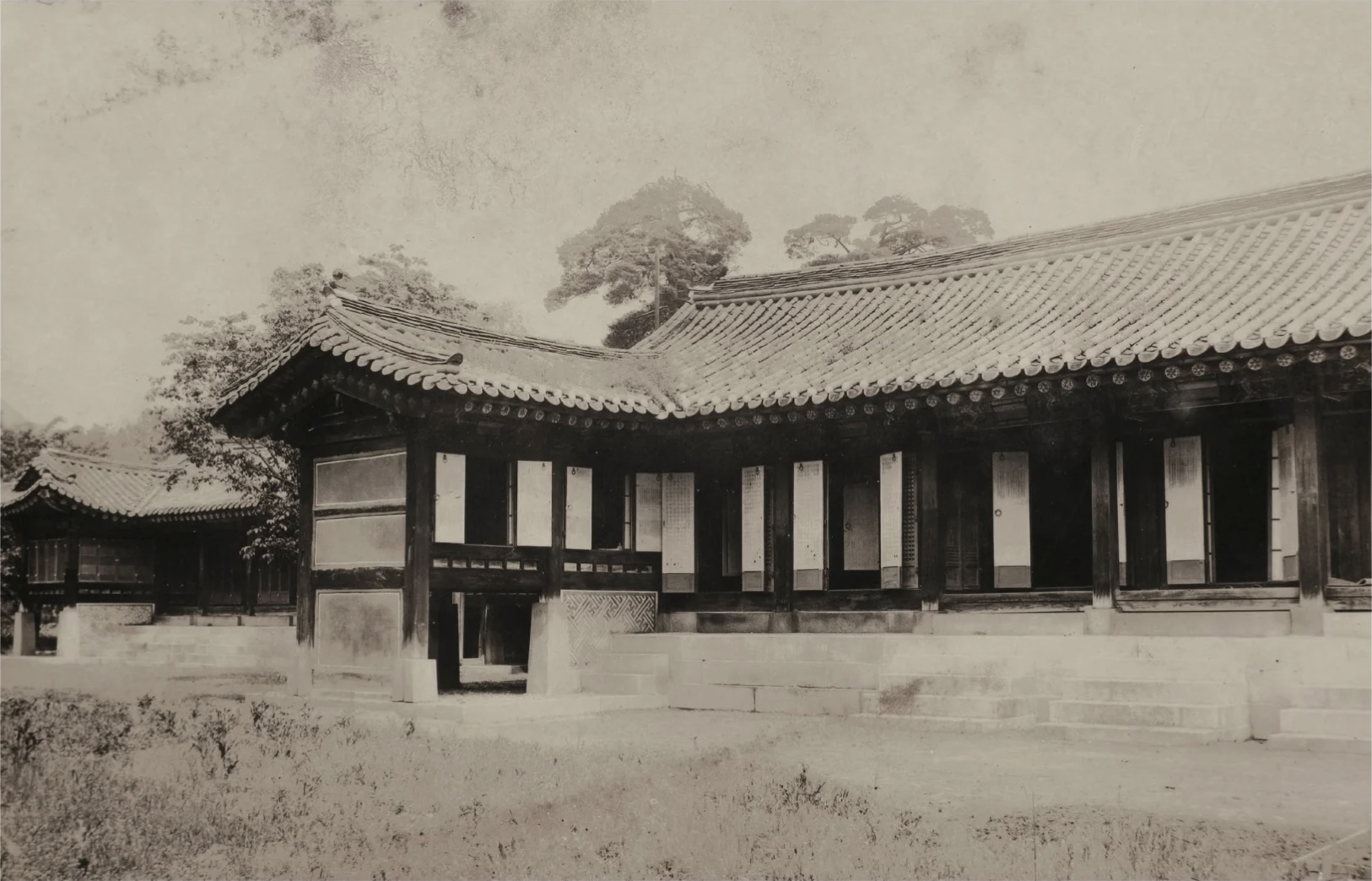
- The museum in Jipgyeongdang of Gyeongbokgung (1924)
- Established: April 9, 1924
- Dissolved: 1945
- Location: Gyeongbokgung, Keijō, Keiki-dō, Korea, Empire of Japan
- Coordinates: 37°34′54″N 126°58′45″E
- Founder: Yanagi Sōetsu, Asakawa brothers

The Chōsen Folk Art Museum (朝鮮民族美術館, Korean: 조선민족미술관) was a Korean folk art museum in the former royal palace Gyeongbokgung, in Keijō (Seoul), Keiki-dō, Korea, Empire of Japan. It operated between 1924 and 1945.

The museum was directly succeeded by the National Folk Museum of Korea, which still operates today.

== History ==
The museum was founded during the 1910 to 1945 Japanese colonial period in Korea. It was established by a number of Japanese people who were interested in Korean culture: the Asakawa brothers and Yanagi Sōetsu. Yanagi met Asakawa Takumi on his first trip to Korea. The two resolved to create the museum together. In January 1921, they publicly announced their intent to establish the museum. Yanagi, in the statement, described the museum as a potential way to ease tensions between Korea and Japan. The use of the term minzoku (民族; lit. 'ethnic') in the museum's name was controversial amongst Japanese people; the term had once been associated with Japanese ethnic nationalism, but had been discouraged in order to facilitate the assimilation of Japan's colonial subjects. Yanagi responded to this controversy by claiming it was being used as an anthropological term for past things. Eventually, they acquired approval for the museum's creation from the Government-General of Chōsen.

It opened at the former royal palace Gyeongbokgung on April 9, 1924. The museum received support from notable Korean people of the time, including Korean independence activists Cho Man-sik and Chang Deok-soo. Yanagi's large personal collection of Korean art formed the bulk of the collection, and he was a significant presence in the museum for much of its history. Asakawa Takumi died in 1931, and his brother Noritaka managed the museum in his stead.

After the 1945 liberation of Korea, the museum and its collection was transferred into the National Museum of Korea. It has since been succeeded by the National Folk Museum of Korea.
