= Yanagi =

Yanagi (柳) ("willow") can refer to:

- Yanagi (surname), a Japanese surname
- Yanagi missions, a series of long-distance submarine voyages during the Second World War
- Yanagi Station, a railway station of Japan's Suzuka Line
- Yanagi ba, a long thin knife used in Japanese cuisine
- Salix koriyanagi, a species of willow used for making baskets and furniture
- Japanese destroyer Yanagi
