= National Folk Museum of Korea =

National museum in Seoul, South Korea

- View of the Museum's main entrance
- Established: 1924
- Location: Samcheongdong-gil 35, Jongno-gu, Seoul, South Korea
- Coordinates: 37°34′54″N 126°58′45″E
- Visitors: 1,813,626 (2017); Ranking 31st globally
- Director: Shin Gwang-seop
- Public transit access: Subway Line 3, Anguk Station, Exit 2
- Website: www.nfm.go.kr

Korean name
- Hangul: 국립민속박물관
- Hanja: 國立民俗博物館
- RR: Gungnip minsok bangmulgwan
- MR: Kungnip minsok pangmulgwan

National Folk Museum of Korea (Korean: 국립민속박물관) is a national museum located on the grounds of Gyeongbokgung in Jongno District, Seoul, South Korea. It uses replicas of historical objects to illustrate the history of traditional life of the Korean people.

== History ==
The museum's predecessor, the Chōsen Folk Art Museum, was founded in 1924, during Japan's occupation of Korea. The three founders were the Asakawa brothers and Yanagi Sōetsu.

The second museum carrying this name established on 8 November 1945 by the U.S. Government and opened on 25 April 1946 at the City Administration Memorial Hall. When the museum was merged with the National Museum of Korea, its collection of 4,555 artifacts was moved to the latter's Namsan site. In 1975, when the National Museum moved onto the grounds of Gyeongbokgung, it moved along with it into the Modern Art Museum Building. In 1993 it opened in its present site, which was the former site of the National Museum of Korea. The building's design is based on various historical buildings around South Korea.

== Collection ==
The museum has over 98,000 artifacts and three main exhibition halls: "History of Korean People" features materials of everyday life in Korea from prehistoric times to the end of the Joseon period in 1910; "Korean Way of Life", which illustrates Korean villagers in ancient times; and "Life Cycle of the Koreans", which depicts the deep roots of Confucianism in Korean culture and how this ideology gave rise to most of the culture's customs.

The museum also features open-air exhibits, such as replicas of spirit posts where villagers used to pray, stone piles for worship, grinding mills, rice storage shelters and pits for kimchi pots.

In March 2021, the National Folk Museum reopened an exhibition showcasing 20th century items from both the Joseon era as well as items from modern and contemporary Korea. The items are on display in Permanent Exhibition Hall 2, which reopened March 20, 2021, after undergoing renovation.

== Gallery ==
entrance to the Children's Museum

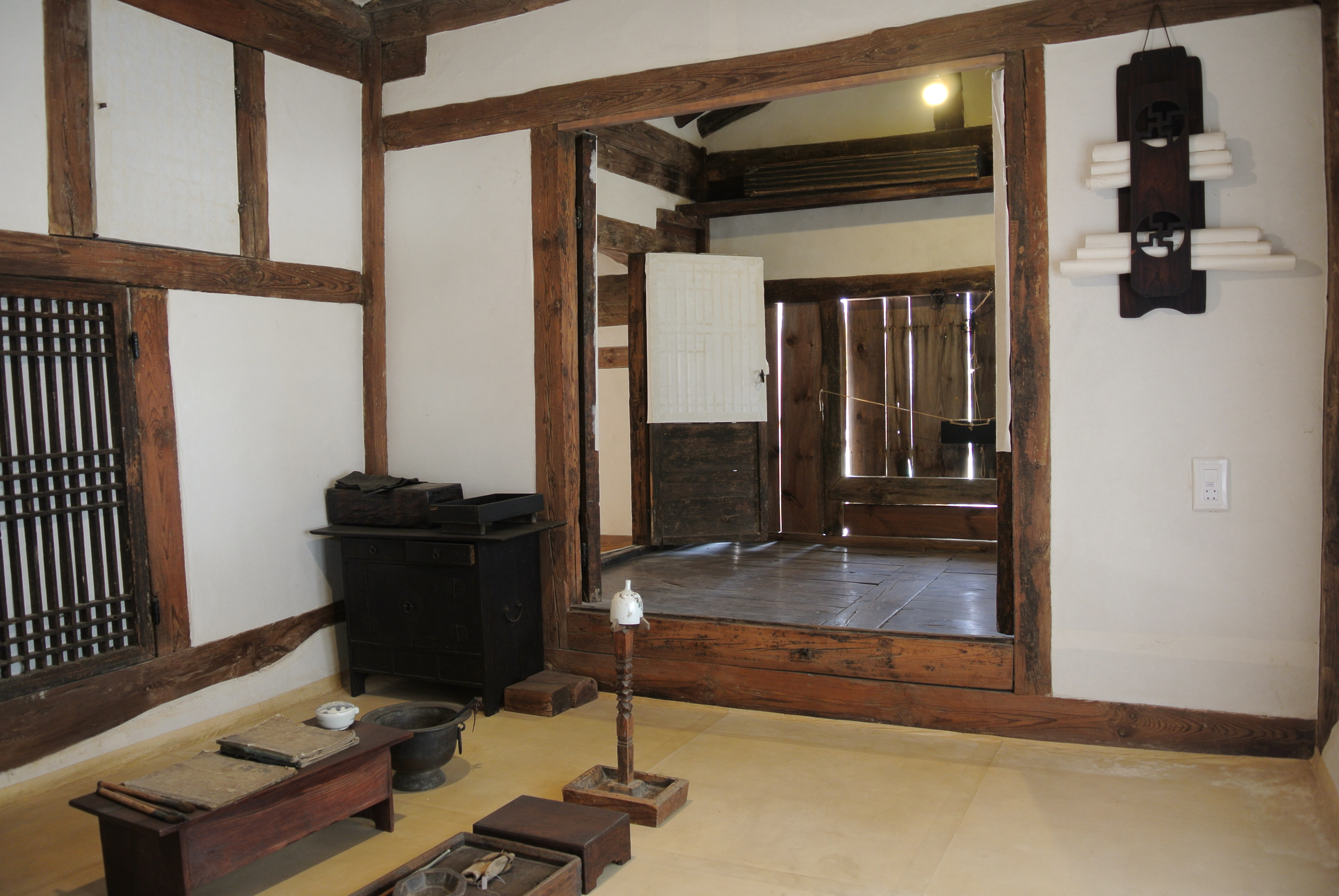
Interior of a traditional Korean house

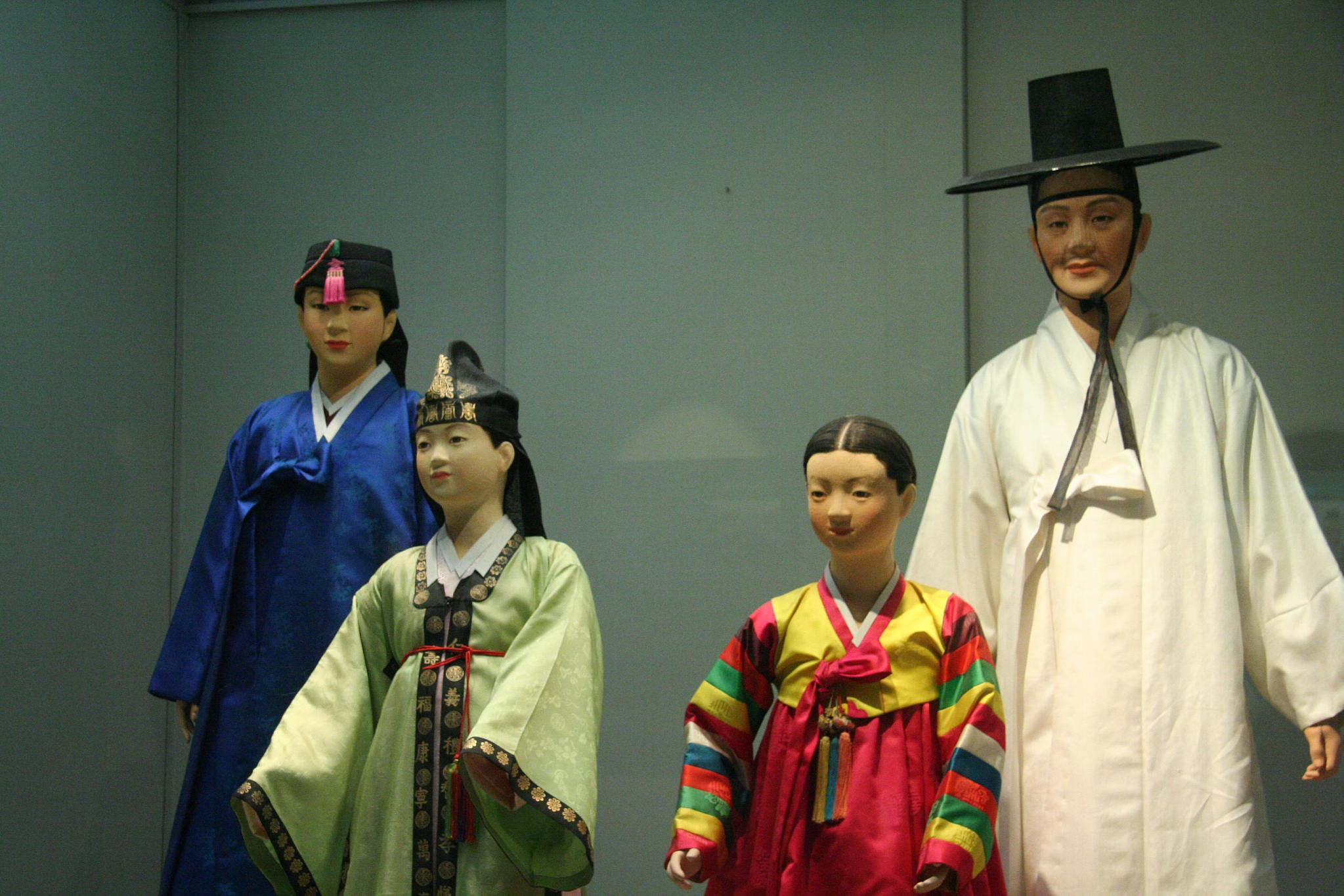
Hanbok collection

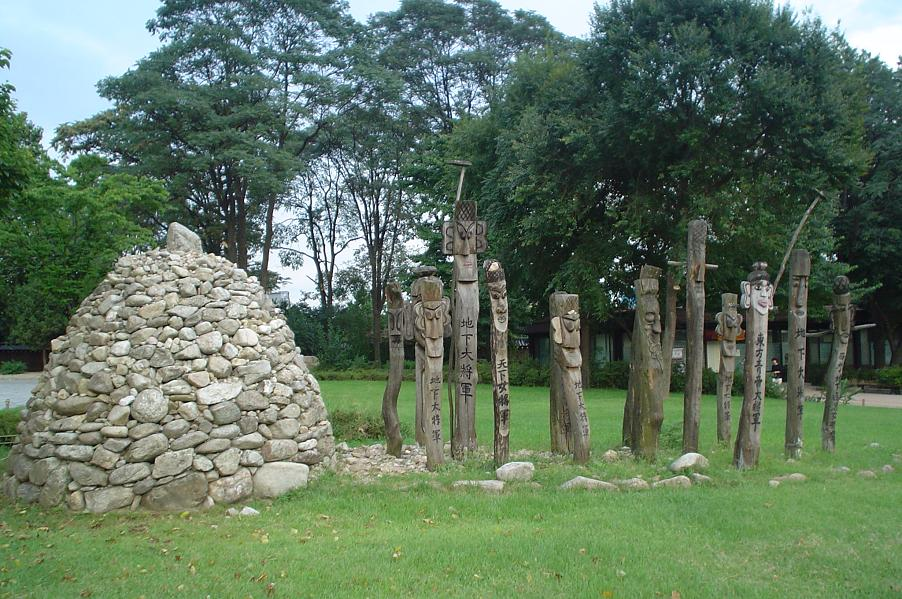
Jangseung collection

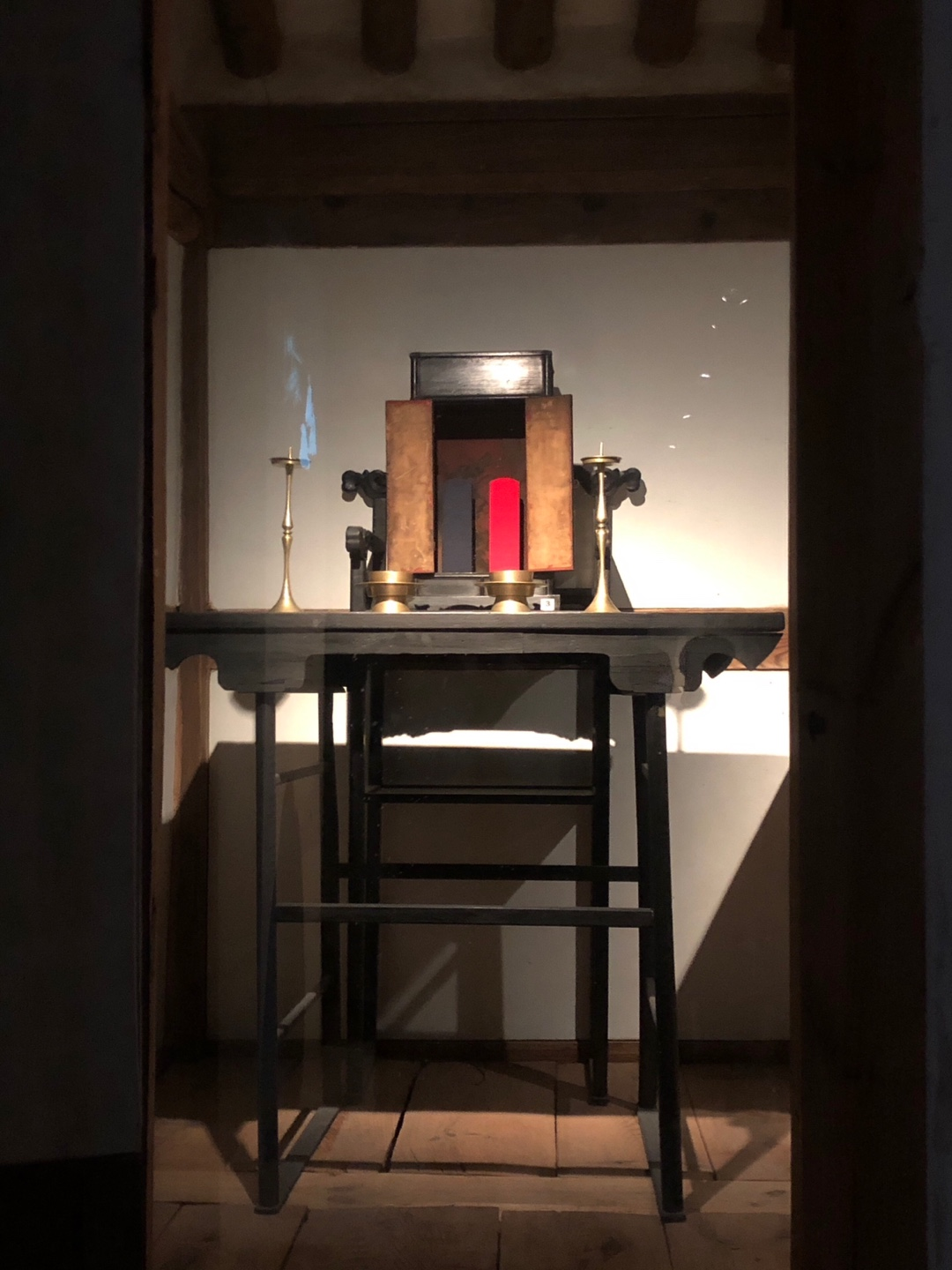
Family altar

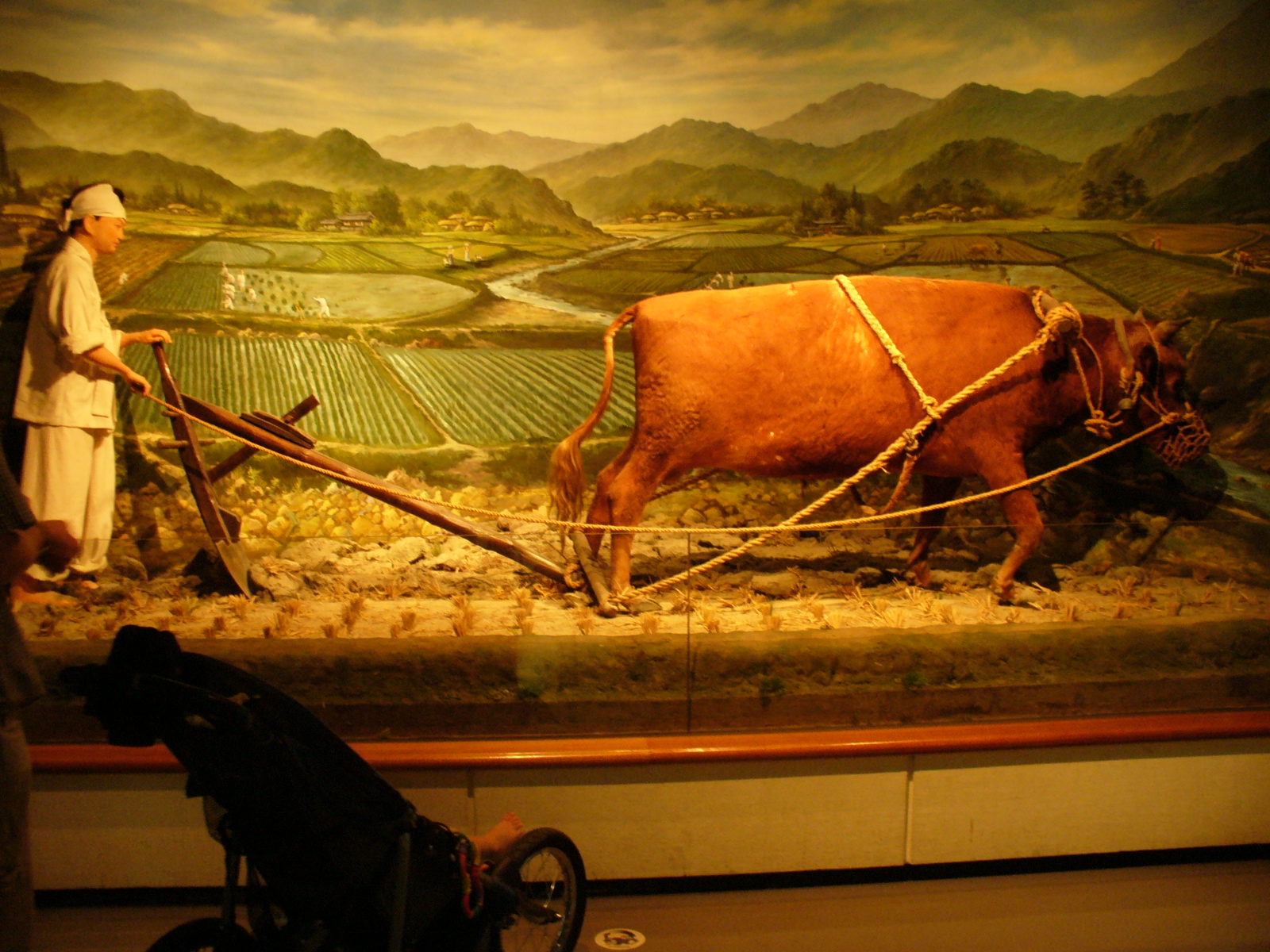
Diorama of traditional farming

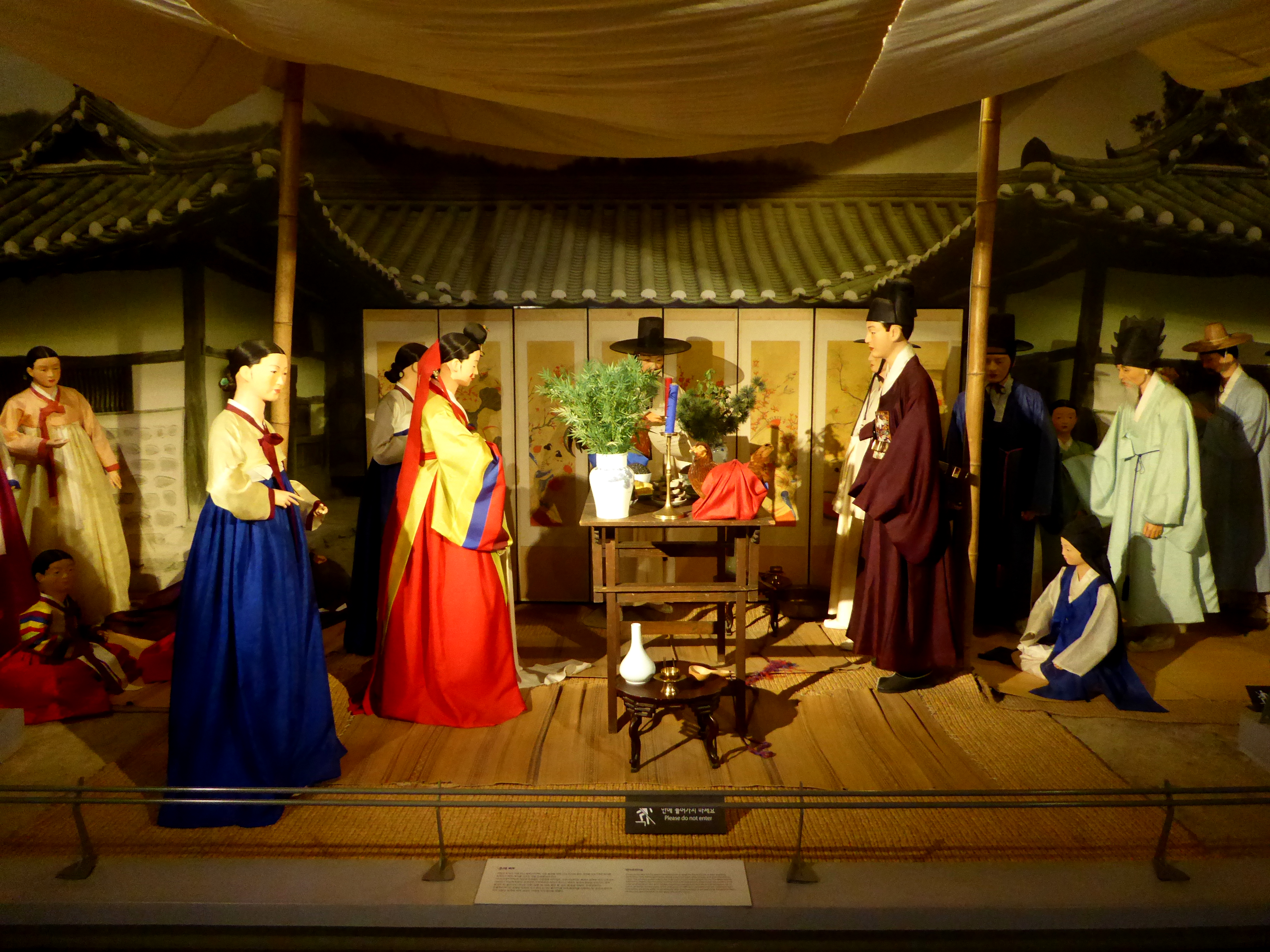
Traditional wedding ceremony

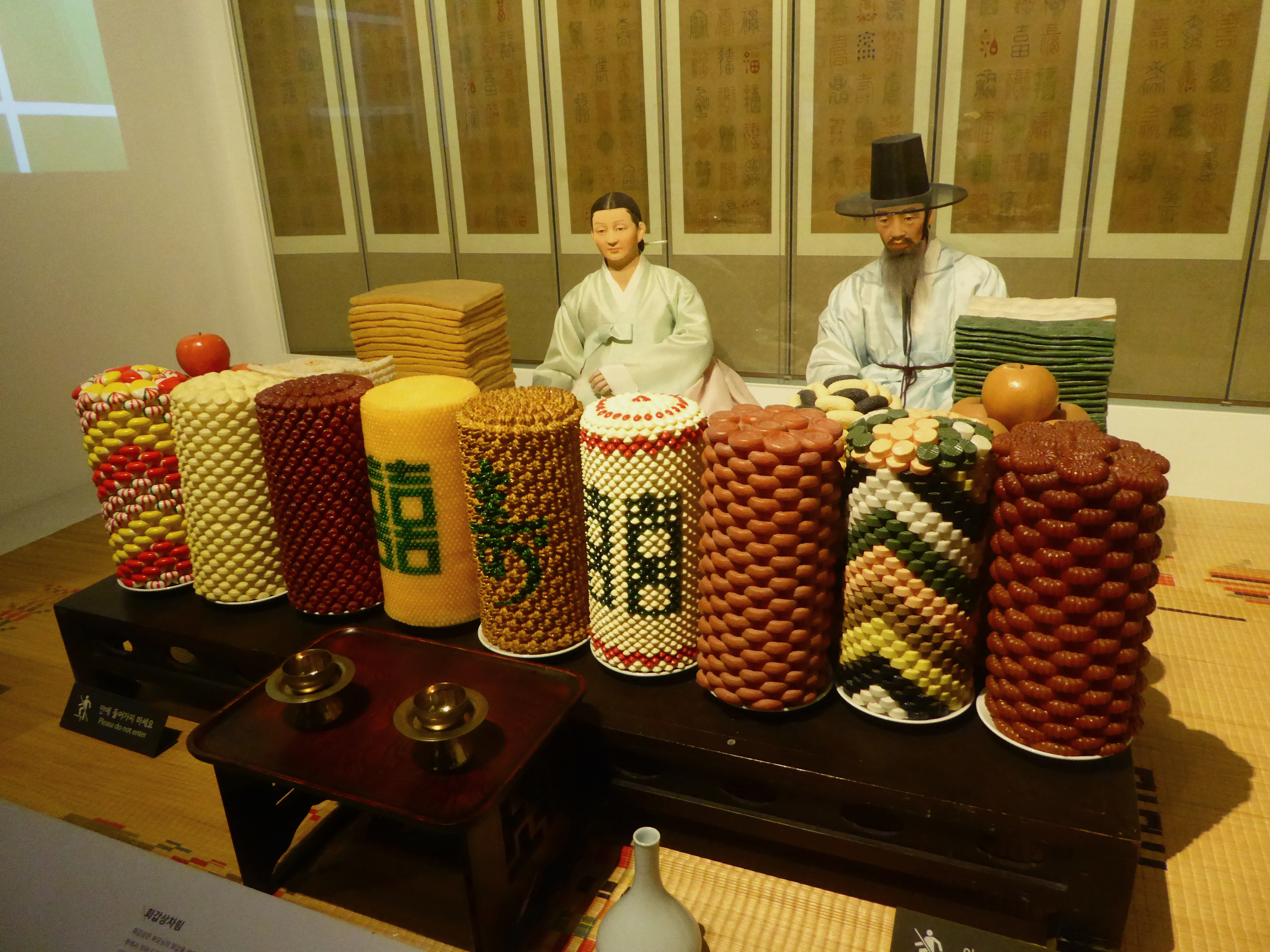
A birthday party

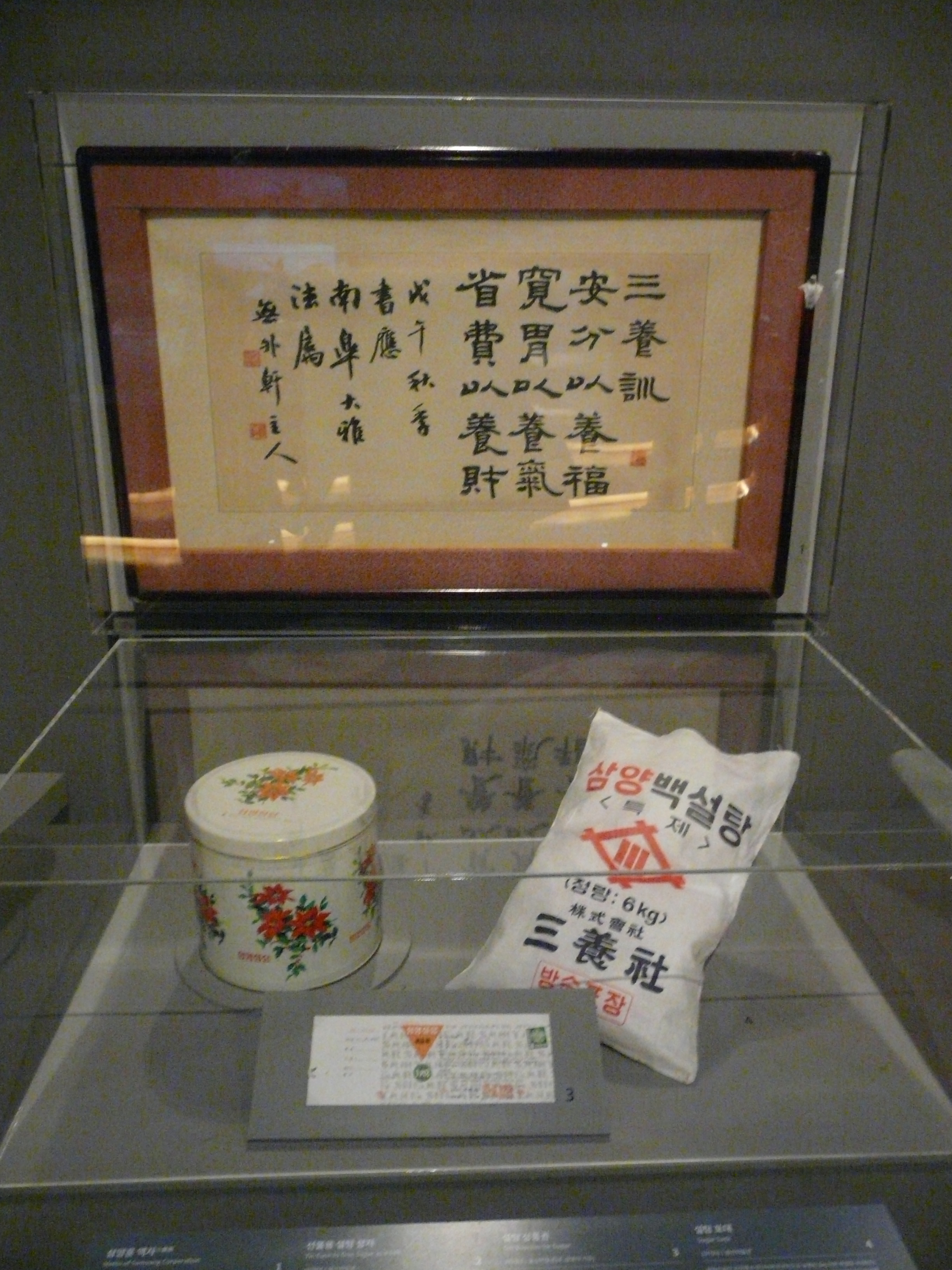
Samyang white sugar and the company's slogan

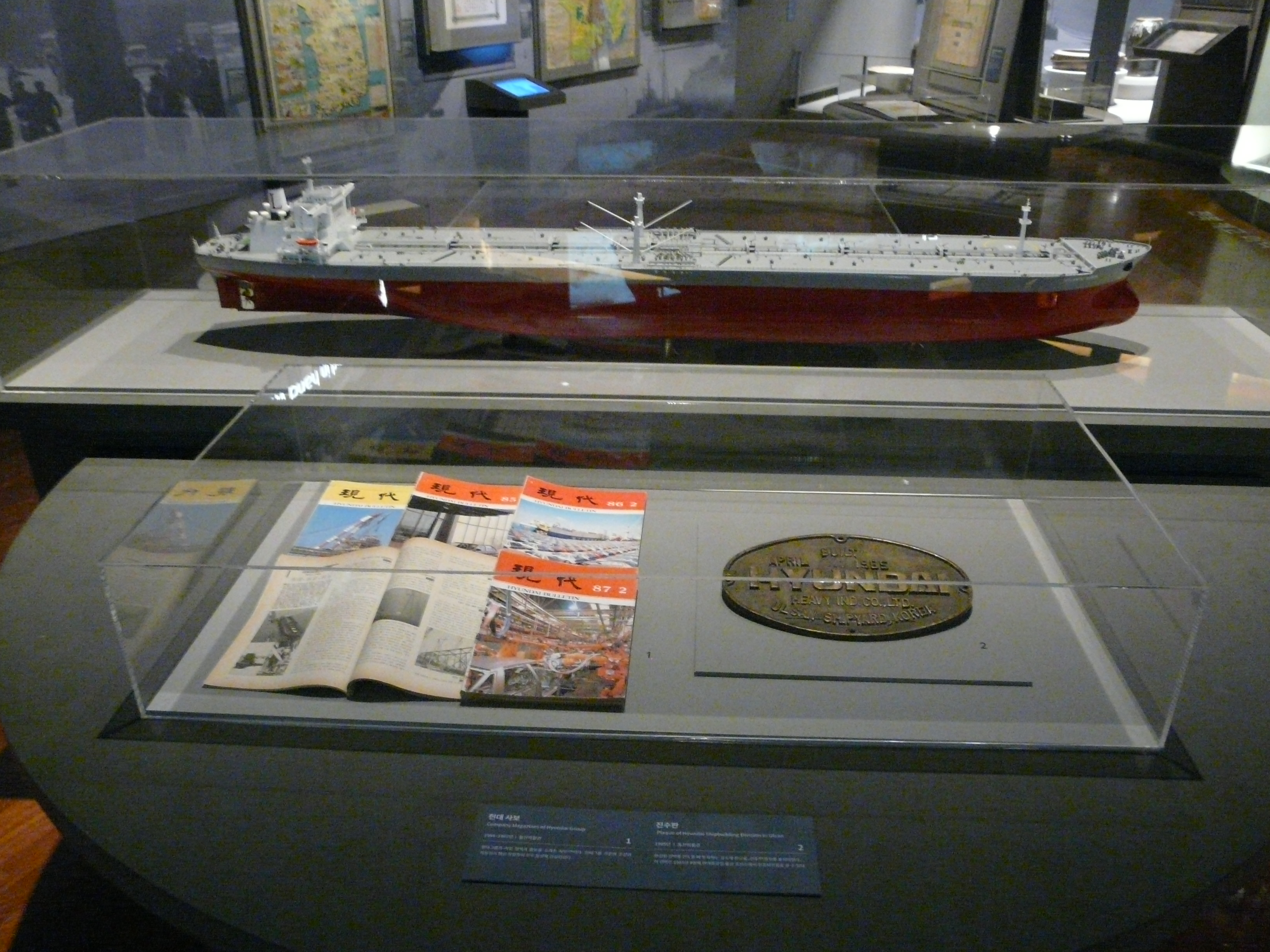
Mockup for a merchant ship built by Hyundai, and the company's magazines

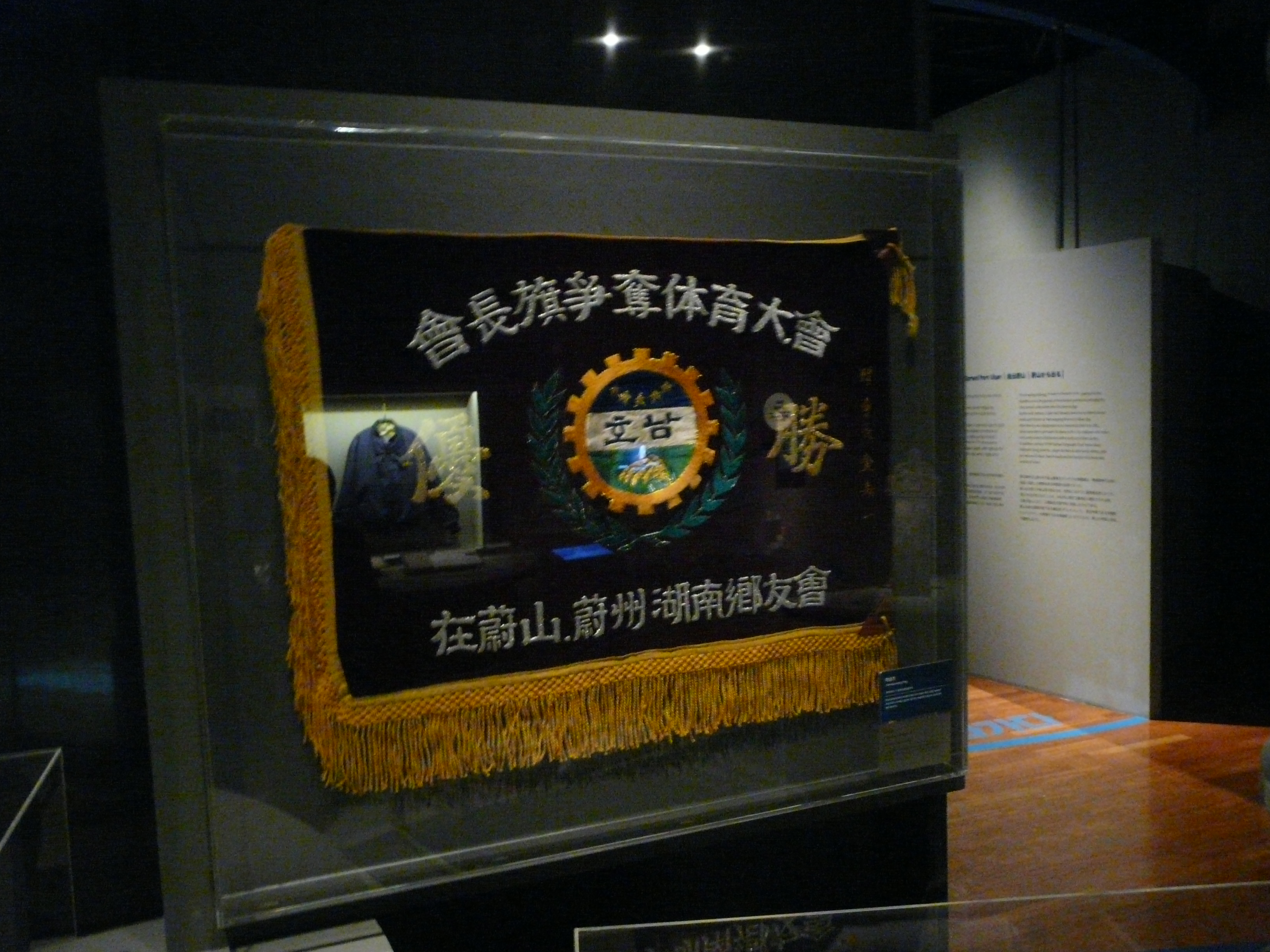
An award banner for sport game

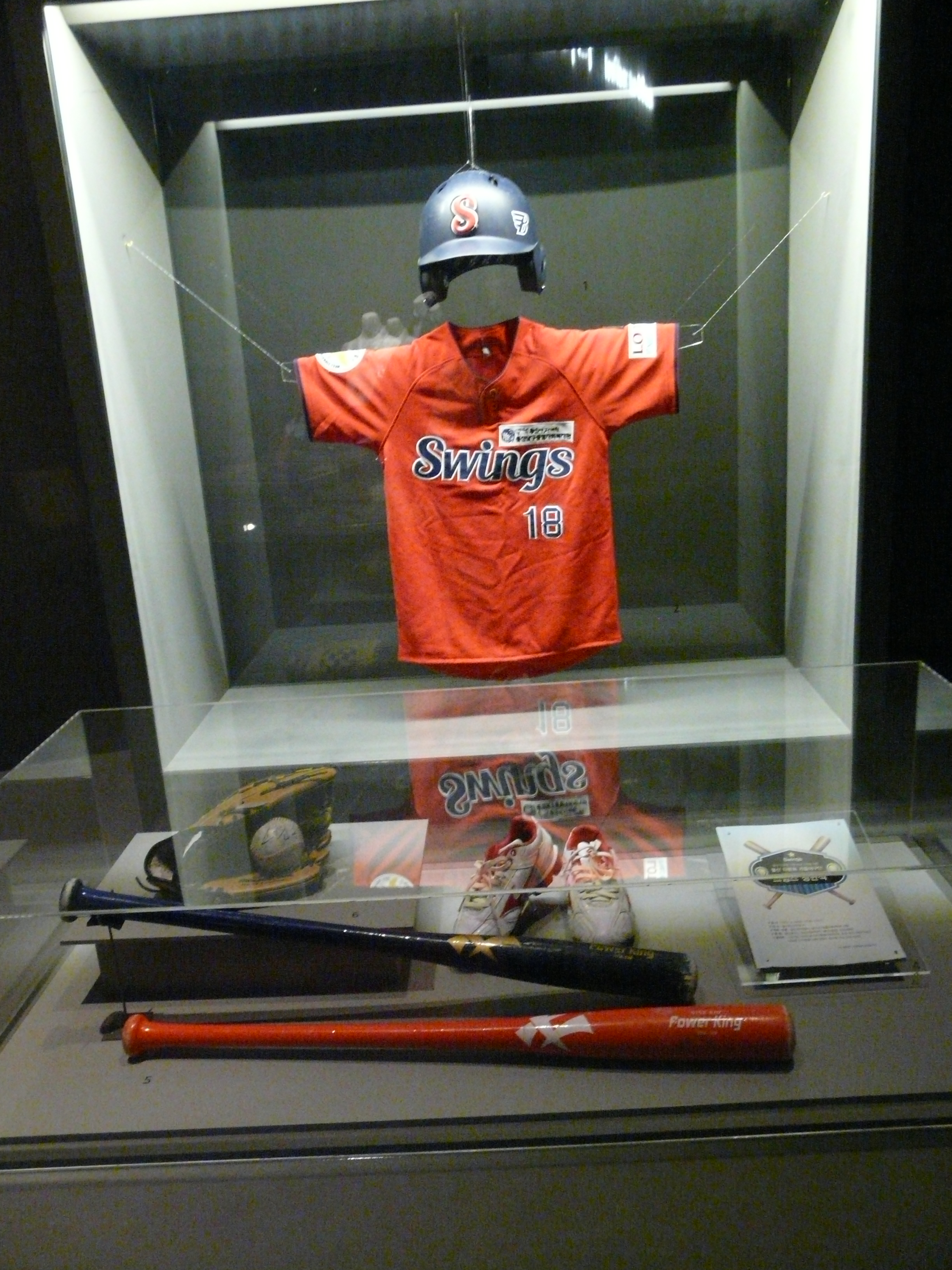
Equipments of a South Korean baseball club

Paper lanterns in the collection of the National Folk Museum of Korea

== Operating hours ==
The hours of operation are from 09:00 to 18:00, March to October, and 09:00 to 17:00, November to February. Also, it offer extended evening hours from 09:00 to 20:00 on Saturdays between March and October, with no extended hours from November to February. Additionally, every last Wednesday of the month is Culture Day.

== See also ==
- Culture of Korea
- List of museums in Seoul
- List of museums in South Korea
