= Ghost in a Black Girl's Throat =

2021 debut poetry collection by Khalisa Rae

Ghost in a Black Girl's Throat: Poems
- Author: Khalisa Rae
- Language: English
- Genre: Poetry
- Publisher: Red Hen Press
- Publication date: 2021-04-13
- Publication place: United States
- Media type: Print
- Pages: 90
- ISBN: 978-1-59709-885-4
- OCLC: 1200832439
- Website: https://khalisarae.com/books/

Ghost in a Black Girl's Throat: Poems is a 2021 debut poetry collection by American writer Khalisa Rae. It was released on April 13, 2021, by Red Hen Press and received positive reception from outlets including Publishers Weekly and The Rumpus.

== Summary ==
The collection follows a young Black woman's life, as well as other Black people from throughout various points in American history, with attention to experiences of misogynoir and white supremacy. The collection is organized into three sections: Fire, Wind and Water, Earth and Spirit.

== Reception ==
Ghost in a Black Girl's Throat received positive reception. Bella Morais praised the collection in The Root, "Ghost in a Black Girl's Throat is a searing confrontation of the living and reconciliation with the ghosts that exist deep within Rae as she examines the racism, sexism and bigotry she is subjected to on a daily basis." Nicole Shawan Junior hailed the collection in a review for The Rumpus: "Rae's collection is a spiritual journey replete with trauma, pain, exaltation, transcendence...Through this examination of the tentacles that shackle the necks of Black women and girls, Rae gives us hope. A blueprint for how we can bobby pin pick off the handcuffs, free our larynxes and limbs from America's ghosts, and deliver ourselves into a wild we call our own." Meghan Sterling praised the writing in Entropy: "Through sharp, imagistic tension, Rae’s poems come alive." Publishers Weekly wrote of the collection: "Readers will be taken by the sometimes dangerous world Rae conjures."

== Publication history ==
2021. Ghost in a Black Girl's Throat, by Khalisa Rae, United States, Red Hen Press ISBN 978-1-59709-885-4. Pub date 2021 April 13, first edition, paperback.
