= Han (cultural) =

Korean concept of grief

- Hangul: 한
- Hanja: 恨
- RR: han
- MR: han
- IPA: [haːn]

Han (Korean: 한), or haan, is a concept of an emotion, variously described as some form of grief or resentment, among others, that is said to be an essential element of Korean identity by some, and a modern post-colonial identity by others.

The historicity of han in premodern Korea is disputed. A national culture of han did not exist in premodern Korea. The contemporary concept of han, that it is a national characteristic of the Korean people, is a modern phenomenon that originated during the Japanese occupation of Korea from Japanese colonial stereotypes and the characterization of Korean art and culture as "sorrowful" in Yanagi Sōetsu's theory of the "beauty of sorrow". The idea that han is a specifically Korean characteristic was adopted and popularized by Koreans in the 20th century. Han has declined significantly in South Korea but maintains popularity in the Korean American community.

== Definitions and characteristics ==
Han is derived from the Chinese character 恨, which means resentment, hatred, or regret.

Definitions and characteristics of han are highly subjective. According to the Translation Journal, "Han is frequently translated as sorrow, spite, rancor, regret, resentment or grief, among many other attempts to explain a concept that has no English equivalent." The novelist Pak Kyongni describes han as both sadness and hope. The film director Im Kwon-Taek, many of whose films deal with han, says that Koreans have different interpretations of han.

Joshua D. Pilzer defines han: "A complex emotional cluster often translated as 'resentful sorrow.' Thought by many to be essentially Korean, and by many others to be the product of modern, post-colonial efforts to create a 'Korean' essence."

Essentialist view

- Kim Yol-kyu defined han as "the collective trauma and the memories of sufferings imposed upon [the Korean people] in the name of oppression over the course of the nation's five thousand-odd years of history". Kim said that the meaning of han is ambiguous. Kim Yol-kyu provided examples of stories, poems, and songs in which some form of han is depicted.
- The minjung theologian Suh Nam-dong described han as "a feeling of unresolved resentment against injustices suffered, a sense of helplessness because of the overwhelming odds against one, a feeling of acute pain in one's guts and bowels, making the whole body writhe and squirm, and an obstinate urge to take revenge and to right the wrong—all these combined".
- Jon Huer describes han as a generational feeling of "having been 'wronged' by a superior agent", such as fate or the government; he says that the accumulated han in Korea is enormous because of a long history of suffering from invasion, poverty, and international indifference.
- According to John M. Glionna, han is "intensely personal, yet carried around collectively, a national torch, a badge of suffering tempered by a sense of resiliency".

Modern view

- Michael D. Shin describes han: "In fact, it's modern. It's a term that captures something of the modern experience of Koreans." Shin says that defining han in terms of emotions is highly subjective; almost any negative emotion can be called "han". He argues that the central aspect of han is loss of identity, and defines han as "the complex of emotions that result from the traumatic loss of collective identity". Han is most commonly associated with divided families: families who were separated during the Korean War. According to Shin, all Koreans may experience han, or a "constant feeling of being less than whole", because of not having a collective identity as a result of the continued division of Korea. Furthermore, new generations of Koreans seemingly inherit it because of growing up in a divided country.
- Sandra So Hee Chi Kim argues that the current usage of the word han in Korean is "a postcolonial translation of a Japanese colonial construct". Similar manifestations of han exist in other Asian languages and cultures, but it has acquired ethnonationalist and essentialist tones in Korea.
- According to Joshua D. Pilzer, the idea of han as a national characteristic is recent and arises from Koreans' "modern search for national essences in the wake of colonialism, and in the midst of authoritarian capitalist development and national division".
- Minsoo Kang argues that "the notion that Koreans are essentially a people of han was constructed entirely in the modern era". According to Kang: "The idea itself has roots in the Japanese imperial ideology that was used to justify the subjugation and exploitation of Koreans during the colonial era."

== History ==
=== Premodern Korea ===
"Han" is not found in the first Korean–English dictionary, published by James S. Gale in 1897, and is rarely found in classical Korean literature. According to Michael D. Shin: "In actuality, classical Korean literature is full of joy and satire and humor, stuff that you don't associate with han. Han is a very small and minor part of classical Korean literature." According to Go Misuk, han in classical Korean literature was rare but suddenly became more prominent in the early 20th century. Traditional Korean stories almost always have happy endings. According to Kim Yol-kyu, Koreans used humor as one way to relieve pent-up han, which is why han is always accompanied by humor in folk music and pansori. All surviving pansori epics have happy endings. According to Minsoo Kang, "there is not a single piece of evidence that anyone prior to the 20th century thought that the word [han] held some special meaning for the Korean character". A national culture of han did not exist in Korea.

According to Michael D. Shin, a collective expression of han was observed by Western missionaries during the Great Pyongyang Revival of 1907. William Blair, a missionary, described the revival: "Then began a meeting the like of which I had never seen before, nor wish to see again unless in God's sight it is absolutely necessary. Every sin a human being can commit was publicly confessed that night." Lord William Cecil observed: "[The missionary] reached only the words "My Father" when with a rush a [sic] power from without seemed to take hold of the meeting. The Europeans described its manifestations as terrifying. Nearly everybody present was seized with the most poignant sense of mental anguish; before each one his own sins seemed to be rising in condemnation of his life." Shin calls what they observed a very raw form of han, and argues that the "awkward" and "terrifying" way in which it was expressed suggests that a culture of han did not exist at that time. According to William Blair, it was an outpouring of the Holy Spirit.

=== Colonial Korea ===
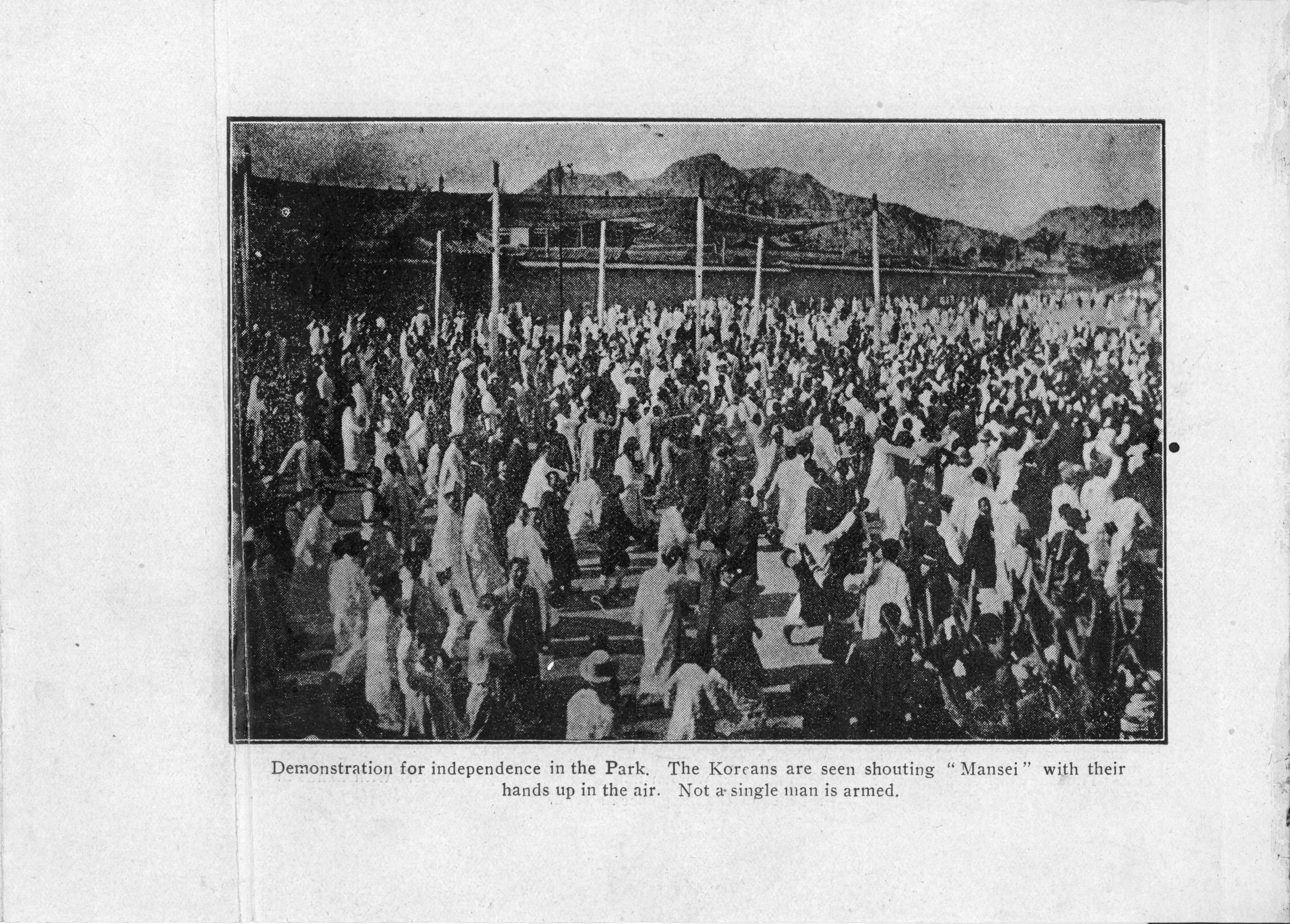
Yanagi Sōetsu was prompted to write about the "beauty of sorrow" by the March First Movement, in which approximately 2,000,000 Koreans participated in more than 1,500 demonstrations.

As a national phenomenon or specifically Korean characteristic, han did not exist in ancient Korea but was an idea anachronistically imposed on Koreans during the Japanese colonial period.

— Korean Han and the Postcolonial Afterlives of "The Beauty of Sorrow"

The concept of han, as a national characteristic, originated from Yanagi Sōetsu's theory of the "beauty of sorrow" (悲哀の美) and Japanese colonial stereotypes of Korea and its people. Following the March First Movement, an independence movement that ended with the death of about 7,000 Koreans at the hands of the Japanese police and military, the Japanese art critic Yanagi Sōetsu wrote articles in 1919 and 1920, expressing sympathy for the Korean people and appreciation for Korean art. In his 1920 article, Yanagi said: "The long, harsh and painful history of Korea is expressed in the hidden loneliness and sadness of their art. It always has a sad beauty and loneliness that brings you to tears. When I look at it, I can not control the emotion that fills my heart. Where else can I find such beauty of sadness."

The characterization of Korea as sad and stagnant was common in Imperial Japan; Japanese historiography of Korea was centered on the idea that Korea was stagnant. To justify the colonization of Korea, the Japanese propagated an image of Koreans as an inferior, uncivilized people, who were incapable of being independent and prone to being invaded and oppressed. The Japanese viewed Korea's "sorrow" as being because of "a national history of unremitting disaster". Yanagi's views of Korea mirrored those of contemporary Japanese colonial politics. Yanagi said that Korean history was characterized by instability, invasion, and subservience; the "sadness" of Korean history was said to be manifested in Korean art, which, according to Yanagi, embodied the "beauty of sorrow". Yanagi contributed to the naturalization of Japanese colonialism in Korea.

The last Korean emperor, Sunjong, was directly associated with han. Following his death in 1926, an article said that his "life of han" ended in sadness. The Dong-a Ilbo wrote: "The anger, bitterness, and sorrow built up inside us have become mixed together, and it could be said that the passing of the Yunghui Emperor [Sunjong] has touched the hearts of the Joseon people and released their pent-up sadness." Han became political because Sunjong's death symbolized the end of Korean history.

Yanagi Sōetsu was accepted as a true friend by contemporary Koreans; he sought to preserve the traditional art of Korea, held fund-raising lectures and concerts for humanitarian aid, and spoke out in defense of Korean people and cultural heritage. Moderate Korean nationalists, who had a non-confrontational approach toward Japanese authority, supported Yanagi, and the Dong-a Ilbo actively promoted and sponsored him. Yanagi was admired by prominent figures in the fields of history, art, and media, who had a profound influence on the formation of modern Korean concepts of traditional art, aesthetics, and history. The concept of han, based on the "beauty of sorrow", was propagated by Korean scholars and writers, continuing Yanagi's legacy, and gradually spread to the entire education system. According to Jeong Il-seong, the passage of modern Korean history, going from the Japanese occupation to independence to national division to civil war to military dictatorship, influenced figures in art and culture to adopt the concept of han.

=== South Korea ===
Ethnic nationalism’s processes took the colonial origin of "the beauty of sorrow" and produced han as an ethnonational, biologistic badge of Korean uniqueness.

— Korean Han and the Postcolonial Afterlives of "The Beauty of Sorrow"

Sandra So Hee Chi Kim's article on han says that "the term han itself emerged as a significant ideological concept during the 1970s" and "[s]ome contend that it was during the Park Chung Hee regime that the idea of han transformed from a personal sense of sorrow and resentment to a broader, national experience of unrelenting suffering and injustice". Han was used politically to promote "Korean uniqueness" and ethnic-national solidarity through a sense of "shared suffering". Han acquired a biologistic aspect, as seen in descriptions of han by the poet Ko Un, "We Koreans were born from the womb of Han and brought up in the womb of Han", and the film critic Ahn Byung-Sup, "Han is an inherent characteristic of the Korean character ... It becomes part of the blood and breath of a person". Korean theologians anachronistically argued that han was a national sentiment in premodern Korea.

During the authoritarian regime of Park Chung Hee, the idea of han, and thus resentment and suffering, as a national characteristic of the Korean people may have been an ideological state apparatus to indoctrinate the working class into accepting the hardships of rapid industrialization and economic inequality; the idea of sadness being an inherent Korean trait had served a similar purpose during the Japanese occupation to naturalize the suffering of the colonized Koreans. Sunghee Choi, an art education scholar, said that her inculcation of han in education started as early as elementary school. According to Minsoo Kang, han has declined significantly since the late 1990s.

== Criticism ==
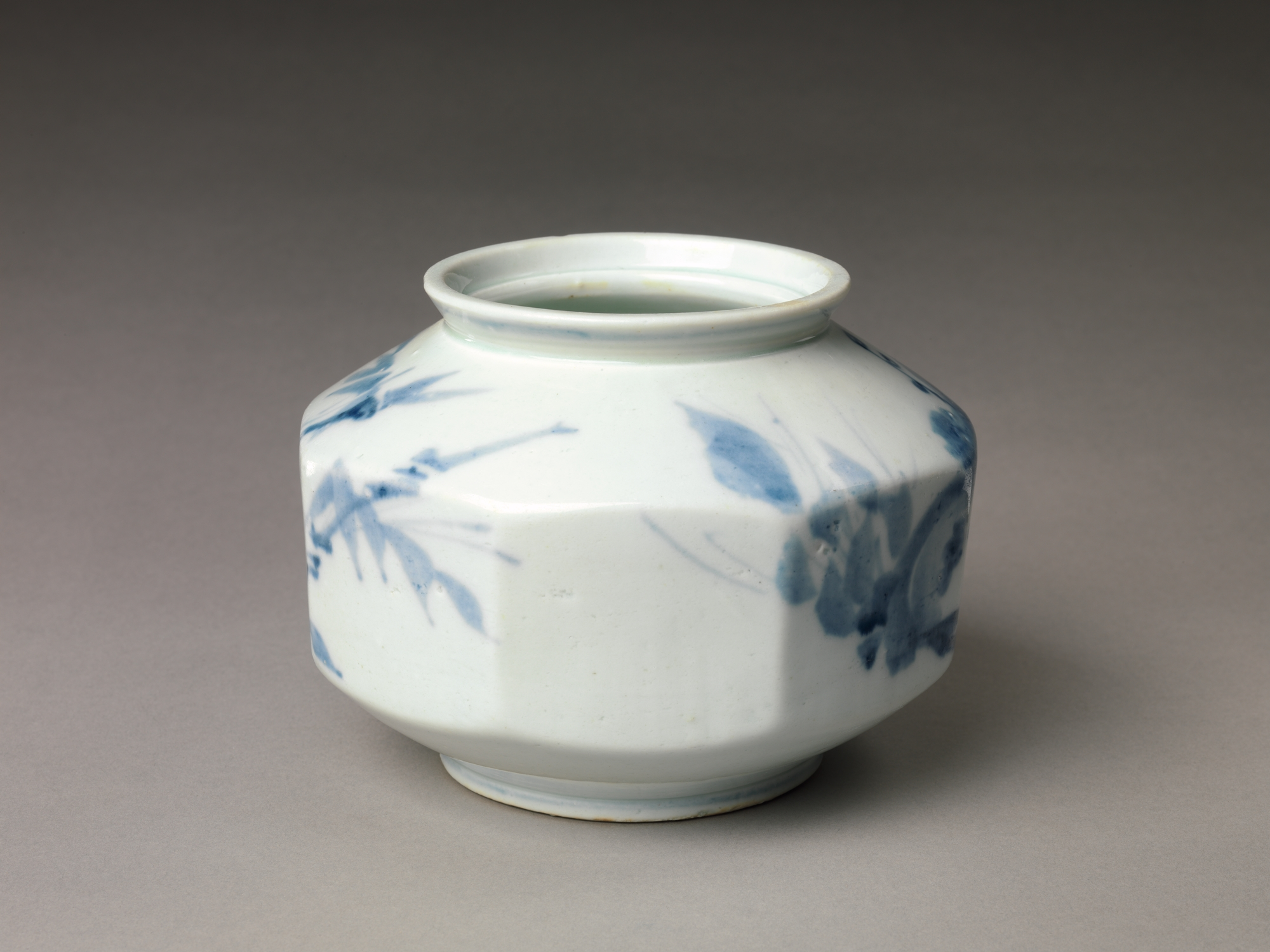
Yanagi Sōetsu viewed the "whiteness" of Joseon white porcelain, among other aspects of Korean culture, as the color of sadness. Yanagi later revised his view: Joseon white porcelain emanates from an "instinctive faith in nature", not sadness. Citing historical examples, Kim Talsu argues that, from a Korean perspective, white is the color of humor and dynamism.

Yanagi Sōetsu's theory of the "beauty of sorrow" has received criticism in both Korea and, more recently, Japan. It has been described as prejudiced, imperialistic, orientalist, sentimentalist, colonialist, and under-theorized. Yanagi's interpretation of Korean history and art has been disputed. The "beauty of sorrow" was criticized by Koreans as early as 1922. In 1974, the poet Choe Harim published an influential article that established the "aesthetics of colonialism" and accused Yanagi's theory of imperialism, colonialism, sentimentalism, and a "superficial interpretation of Korean history". Choe criticized Yanagi's view, that Korean art has a "beauty of sorrow" because Korea has long suffered at the hands of foreign countries, as being in accordance with Japanese colonial policies, which, he said, were intended to instill a sense of defeat and shame in Koreans about Korean history.

Mark Peterson disagrees with the view that Korea experienced many invasions, a view that he says is a 20th-century phenomenon that was advocated during the Japanese colonial period, and argues that Korea experienced very few invasions and had long periods of peace and stability. Peterson also disagrees with the Japanese colonial view of Korea as stagnant, inefficient, and corrupt. John Duncan calls the idea that Korea experienced constant invasions or that Korea has a "history of suffering" (수난의 역사) a myth, and argues that premodern Korean history is characterized by very long periods of peace. According to David C. Kang, the dominant narrative depicting Korean history as "one of almost incessant foreign incursions" is a meme that emerged in the 20th century. Minsoo Kang calls the idea of a Korean character shaped by foreign invasions a modern myth that is still circulating today.

The history of han is as problematic as that of 'hysteria', which begs the question of why anyone aware of its past would want to persist in its use, even through a redefinition that rejects its imperialist, racist, ethnonationalist and sexist legacy. Ever since Japanese propagandists invented the notion of Koreans as a people defined by their essential sorrow, so many people have attached so many disparate meanings to it that it has become a confused mishmash of ideas, in the same way that 'hysteria' became a meaningless term signifying any person, usually a woman, who displays extreme emotional behaviour.

— Minsoo Kang

Mari Nakami says that Yanagi did not profess to be an expert or intend for his theory to be an "objective observation" or a "scientifically approached scholarly study", but rather "an expression of the human heart". Furthermore, Nakami argues that the "beauty of sorrow" was not the only perspective Yanagi had of Korean art: He expressed admiration and praise for Korean art, such as the Seokguram, and believed that most Japanese national art was Korean in origin or an imitation of Korean art. Yanagi gradually changed his theory of Korean art from the "beauty of sorrow" to the "beauty of health", the "beauty of naturalness", and the "beauty of unity".

Despite receiving criticism for his theory, Yanagi Sōetsu has oft been praised for his humanism and preservation of traditional Korean art. In 1984, he was posthumously awarded the Bogwan Order of Cultural Merit, the first to be awarded to a non-Korean.

Han is criticized as patriarchal.

== Proverbs ==
According to Kim Yol-kyu, han is expressed in Korean proverbs about womanhood and poverty:

- 여자가 한을 품으면 오뉴월에도 서리가 내린다. Frost can fall even in May and June, if a woman harbors a grudge [han]. (A woman's vengeance knows no bounds.)
- 똥구멍이 찢어지게 가난하다." (as poor as a church mouse)

== In popular culture ==
Han, as a theme, is expressed in contemporary pansori. In the late 20th century, the sorrowful "Western style" of pansori overtook the vigorous "Eastern style" of pansori, and pansori began being called the "sound of han". All surviving pansori epics end happily, but contemporary pansori focuses on the trials and tribulations of the characters, commonly without reaching the happy ending because of the contemporary popularity of excerpt performances. The history of pansori in the late 20th century, including the recent canonization of han, has led to great concern in the pansori community.

In American media, han has been referenced in Anthony Bourdain: Parts Unknown, "Koreatown, Los Angeles", and The West Wing, "Han".

In the Marvel Comic Book story New York State of Mind, written by Maurene Goo, with art from Lynne Yoshi and part of Marvel's Voices: Identity (Vol.1#1; released on August 25, 2021) Korean heroes Brawn and Silk discuss the concept of "han": Silk describes her interpretation as “...its like collective grief and resentment we carry because of oppression”. While fighting the villain Scarecrow (who laments at feeling invisible because his crimes didn't attract the attention of the Avengers), Silk and Brawn enumerate a number of indignities regularly experienced by Asian Americans. The fight concludes with Brawn delivering a knockout punch while saying: "We're Korean. We're born angry!"

== In the Korean American community ==
Korean American scholar Elaine H. Kim has written on han in relation to the 1992 Los Angeles riots in her 1993 essay "Home Is Where The Han Is".

Korean American scholar and poet Seo-Young Chu coined the term "postmemory han" in her 2008 essay "Science Fiction and Postmemory Han in Contemporary Korean American Literature," published in MELUS.

What does it mean for a second-generation Korean American to grieve for an uncle who disappeared in North Korea long before she was born? What does it mean for a second-generation Korean American to feel personally degraded by the soldiers who raped thousands of comfort women during WWII? Why should their dehumanization affect her so viscerally? How can a second-generation Korean American feel wounded by the Demilitarized Zone (DMZ)—as though the wound were still raw, as though the 38th parallel cut her own body in half? Is it possible for her to feel homesick for the mountains of North Korea, an alien land where she has never been? –Seo-Young Chu

According to Chu's 2008 essay, in many Korean American literary works (e.g., Dictee by Theresa Hak Kyung Cha, The Language of Blood by Jane Jeong Trenka, Notes from the Divided Country by Suji Kwock Kim, and Comfort Woman by Nora Okja Keller), Americans of Korean descent are sometimes portrayed as experiencing "Americanized" or second-generation han. More recently, in her hybrid creative nonfiction poem "I, Discomfort Woman: A Fugue in F Minor," published in 2023 in The Margins/Asian American Writers' Workshop, Chu responds to criticism of han, writing: "Han I reclaim and redefine as my Korean American response to injustice" and "Hwabyung I reclaim and redefine as a cathartic way of experiencing political agency and creative power."

According to Minsoo Kang, South Koreans and Korean Americans have different views toward han: South Koreans attach little importance to han, viewing it as a thing of the past, while Korean Americans attach great importance to han, viewing it as a way to build an identity.

== Hwabyeong ==
According to a study from 1994, based on personal interviews, exposure to han was deemed one of the main causes of hwabyeong.

== See also ==
- Emotional baggage
- Invented tradition
- Korean culture
- Korean language
