= Seo-Young Chu =

Korean American academic, poet and activist

Seo-Young Jennie Chu
- Born: January 14, 1978; Virginia
- Citizenship: U.S.
- Education: 2007 – PhD in English, Harvard University
- Occupations: Academic, writer, artist, poet, #MeToo activist, Associate Professor
- Writing career
- Subjects: aesthetics, Asian American literature, autotheory, cognitively estranging referents, death, digital writing, disability, dreams, Englishes, the Korean DMZ, Emily Dickinson, globalization, the gothic, han, Korea, mental illness, poetry, Postmemory Han, rape culture, robots, science fiction, sexual violence, suicide, theory, Theresa Hak Kyung Cha, trauma, the uncanny valley
- Notable works: A Refuge for Jae-in Doe and Other Fugues, Do Metaphors Dream of Literal Sleep? A Science-Fictional Theory of Representation
- Movements: autotheory, #MeToo, feminism, experimental writing, speculative memoir

Seo-Young Chu (Korean: 주서영; born January 14, 1978) is a queer Korean American scholar, feminist, poet, #MeToo activist, and associate professor of English at Queens College, CUNY. She is the author of A Refuge for Jae-in Doe and Other Fugues (punctum books) and Do Metaphors Dream of Literal Sleep? A Science-Fictional Theory of Representation (Harvard University Press).

Chu is best known for her scholarship on science fiction, her writing on the Koreas, her work on postmemory han, her work on the uncanny valley, her creative nonfiction and lyric poems exploring mental illness and sexual violence, and her work as an activist against rape culture on college campuses. She was one of the earliest #MeTooAcademia advocates, first speaking out in 2017, and remains active in the movement. She frequently campaigns for universities and colleges to create more robust sexual harassment policies, and enforce them. She also regularly speaks out on behalf of sexual assault victims in academia, encouraging universities to take accusations seriously, respond with compassion, and provide help to victims. She has also spoken out about sexual violence against Asian Americans.

== Life ==
According to Chu's autobiographical essay "Free Indirect Suicide," published in The Rumpus in March 2019, Chu was born in 1978 in Northern Virginia to Korean parents. According to a 2023 article in The Knight News, Chu's mother was born during the Korean War and Chu's father was orphaned by the Korean War. Chu is open about her struggles with generational trauma, bipolar disorder, rape trauma, and complex post-traumatic stress, writing publicly about her multiple psychiatric hospitalizations and life as a disabled person. The Amazon author biography for Chu describes her as a "queer agnostic spinster".

In 2000, several months after surviving her first suicide attempt as a graduating senior at Yale, and shortly after starting a PhD program in the Department of English at Stanford University, Chu was sexually harassed and raped by the William Robertson Coe Professor in American Literature at Stanford University Jay Fliegelman, for whom she was working as a teaching assistant and research assistant. Due to pressure from her parents to keep quiet, Chu never pressed charges and never hired a lawyer. Nonetheless, the law required Stanford University to conduct an independent investigation that resulted in significant sanctions against Fliegelman, including suspension for two years without pay. During his suspension from 2000 to 2002, Fliegelman was still granted access to students and university resources. After his suspension, Stanford covered up both the abuse and the punishment by naming mentorship awards and a library after Fliegelman.

Subsequent to being abused at Stanford, Chu changed her name from Jennie to Seo-Young, changed her field from Early American Literature to science fiction, and reapplied to PhD programs, transferring in 2001 to Harvard University, where she worked with Elaine Scarry and earned a PhD in English and American Literature and Language in 2007. In 2008, Chu published an influential essay on postmemory han and Korean American literature in MELUS. In 2009, Chu started a tenure-track position in the Department of English at Queens College, CUNY. In 2011, Chu published a well-received monograph titled Do Metaphors Dream of Literal Sleep? A Science-Fictional Theory of Representation (Harvard University Press). In 2016, Chu earned tenure at Queens College, CUNY.

In 2017 Chu published "A Refuge for Jae-in Doe," in Entropy Magazine, in which Chu wrote about being abused at Stanford and living with posttraumatic stress. The publication became part of the dialogue about #MeToo and #MeTooAcademia in particular. "A Refuge for Jae-in Doe" was selected for inclusion in The Best American Nonrequired Reading 2018, Best American Experimental Writing 2020, and Advanced Creative Nonfiction: A Writer's Guide and Anthology (Bloomsbury Writer's Guides and Anthologies). In 2021, Chu successfully campaigned for Stanford to remove Fliegelman's name from the Fliegelman Library of Association Copies, though what happened to the collection of expensive rare books, many of which were financed by Stanford University, and some of which Fliegelman used to molest Chu and others, remains less than clear.

== Education ==
In 1999 Chu earned a B.A. degree from Yale. In 2001, Chu earned a M.A. degree from Stanford. In 2007, Chu earned a Ph.D. degree from Harvard.

== Work ==
Chu has written and spoken about science fiction, the DMZ in Korea, postmemory han, poetry, North Korea, her experiences as a survivor of sexual violence in the English Department at Stanford University, and her struggles with bipolar disorder and suicidal ideation. Her publications include "Closely Associated: The Metonymic Logic of Rape Culture," "Fugue in Dream Minor," "Survivor-Shaped Specters and Gaps," "Excerpts from an Anti-Standardized '수능': A Design-Fictional Approach to Korea," "I, Discomfort Woman: A Fugue in F Minor," "Dear Stanford: You Must Reckon With Your History of Sexual Violence," "Welcome to the Vegas Pyongyang," Do Metaphors Dream of Literal Sleep? A Science-Fictional Theory of Representation, "Hwabyung Fragments," "Are Postmodernism and MeToo Incompatible?," "Science Fiction and Postmemory Han in Contemporary Korean American Literature," "The DMZ Responds," "A Refuge for Jae-in Doe: Fugues in the Key of English Major," "M'어머니," "Dream of the Ambassador, 12/21/2016," "The Lyric We," "Two Koreas, in the Key of Emily Dickinson," "Chogakpo Fantasia," "Dickinson and Mathematics," "Emoji Poetics," "Tiny Art Museum for the Floater in My Eye," "I, Stereotype: Detained in the Uncanny Valley," "Dystopian Surface, Utopian Dream," "Free Indirect Suicide: An Unfinished Fugue In H Minor," "Old Typewriter in a Field," "Translator of Soliloquies," "Utopias Misplaced: The Cost of Outsourcing Dystopian Poetics to North Korea," "Hypnotic Ratiocination," "The Dream Life of Waste: Archaeologies of the Soul in the Key of Capitalism," "jogakpo window (7 feet x 4 feet)," and "Imagining an Asian American Superhero of North Korean Origin." Chu is also a contributing writer to the experimental film I See You and You See Me (2021), which tells "Stories of Queens residents during the time of the coronavirus."

Chu's creative nonfiction has been listed among "Notable Essays & Literary Nonfiction" in The Best American Essays 2020 and anthologized in The Best American Nonrequired Reading 2018, Best American Experimental Writing 2020, and Advanced Creative Nonfiction. Her work has been cited by Jia Tolentino in The New Yorker; by Amanda Gorman in Call Us What We Carry; by Mia You in Poetry; and by Cathy Park Hong in Minor Feelings. In 2017, 2018, and more recently, "A Refuge for Jae-in Doe" and Chu's advocacy for survivors have sparked dialogue about MeToo in academia, particularly at Stanford. Media attention has included articles in New York Magazine, KQED, The New Republic, The Washington Post, Literary Hub, The Chronicle of Higher Education, The Stanford Daily, NBC News, Amerasia Journal, and Inside Higher Ed.
