= Yanagi Narayoshi =

Japanese hydrographer and politician

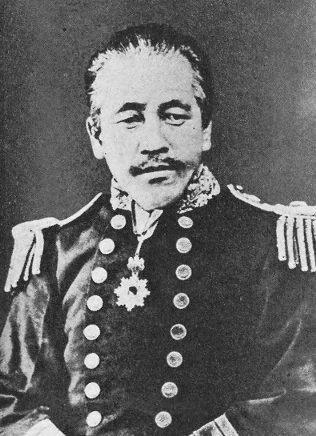

Yanagi Narayoshi (Japanese: 柳楢悦; October 8, 1832 – January 15, 1891) was a Japanese mathematician, hydrographer, politician, and Imperial Japanese Navy officer.

His father was Yanagi Sogoro, a samurai officer of the Tsu domain at Edo.

== Brief career ==
Narayoshi learned mathematics from Murata Tsunemitsu, and was engaged in survey work around Ise Bay. In 1855, he was dispatched to Naval Training Center at Nagasaki in 1855, and then took part in the establishment of the Shogunate navy at Edo. After the Meiji Restoration, he entered the Imperial Navy, and became chief hydrographer when HMS Sylvia approached the Meiji government for joint survey over Japan's coastal lines.

In 1888, after he retired from the Imperial Navy, he became a politician, serving in the House of Peers.

== Family ==
- 3rd son - Yanago Soetsu (柳宗悦), art critics, pioneer of Japan's folk art movement.
- Grand son - Yanagi Sori (柳宗理), product designer.

== Footnotes ==
1. 『官報』第2185号、明治23年10月6日。
