= Asakawa brothers =

Japanese Koreanists (fl. 20th century)

Noritaka Asakawa (浅川 伯教, Asakawa Noritaka; August 4, 1884 – January 14, 1964) (ja:) and Takumi Asakawa (浅川 巧, Asakawa Takumi; January 15, 1891 – April 2, 1931) (ja:) are two brothers who pioneered the study of Korean ceramics, and who worked to preserve and promote indigenous Korean culture. The two brothers were born in Yamanashi Prefecture, Japan, but would move to the Korean peninsula by early adulthood. Noritaka introduced Soetsu Yanagi to Joseon ceramics, and he alongside his brother greatly influenced Yanagi who later stated, "My encounter with Yi (Joseon) Dynasty everyday utensils was a critical one in that it determined the course of my whole life."

During Japan's occupation of Korea, Noritaka was stationed as a Japanese elementary school teacher in present-day Seoul with Takumi being sent there a year later as a forest engineer. The Asakawa brothers alongside Yanagi were critical of the Japanization of Korea during Japan's occupation, and stressed the value and importance in maintaining Korea's native culture. In 1924 the three founded the National Folk Museum of Korea, in Seoul, displaying examples of Korean culture as well as their own research.

Noritaka devoted the remainder of his life to searching for and studying Joseon ceramics. During his lifetime he surveyed 700 sites of old kilns, recovering and classifying enormous quantities of pieces and remnants. A member of the Society for the Appreciation of Korean Arts and Crafts, the essays he wrote appeared in such periodicals as the Shirakaba, the leading literary magazine in his time, and would harbinger appreciation of Joseon ware outside of Korea. Noritaka's body of work continues to receive academic praise to this day. Additionally, Noritaka produced paintings that were often inspired by the Korean artifacts he observed. His brother Takumi would ultimately publish "Survey of Korean Ceramics," an enormously important reference volume that remains in print today, detailing and describing various aspects of Korean ceramics.

Takumi lived as a Korean, and died at the age of 40 after delivering his final words "bury my bones in the land of Joseon." Beloved by the locals he was given a funerary procession, and would posthumously become well known for his work promoting Korean culture, being depicted in the novel "The Man of White Porcelain", by Emiya Takayuki, which is due to be released as a film in 2012. In 2011, Chiba City Art Museum held a special exhibition titled "Asakawa Noritaka & Takumi Brothers: Their Souls and Their Visions" to commemorate the 120th anniversary of Takumi's birth.
