= Shinya Yanagi =

Japanese artisan

Shinya Yanagi (柳晋哉, born 1987, Tokyo) is a Japanese artisan specializing in tsumugi dyeing and weaving. He is the grandson of the weaver Yoshihiro Yanagi, who is the nephew of Sōetsu Yanagi, who is known as the father of the Mingei (Folk Craft) Movement, and the son of Sou Yanagi, the second-generation head of the Yanagi Dyeing and Weaving Workshop.

Yanagi graduated from interior design school and initially worked at a construction company before joining the world dyeing and weaving. Two years after joining the workshop, he exhibited his first work under his own name at the Japan Folk Craft Museum Exhibition, where he was selected for the first time. In 2019, he received the Encouragement Award at the same exhibition.

== Style ==
Yanagi is known for his use of blue, which he dyes using a mix of synthetic and natural dyes. He produces roughly 60 obi and 10 kimono a year. He views Mingei as "the energy of craftsmanship," a philosophy that continues to inspire his work.
