= Yusuke Yanagi =

Japanese virologist (born 1955)

Yusuke Yanagi (Kanji:栁 雄介, Yanagi Yusuke; born 1955) is a Japanese virologist currently at Kyushu University and an Elected Fellow of the American Association for the Advancement of Science.
