= Japanese destroyer Yanagi =

Two destroyers of the Imperial Japanese Navy were named Yanagi:

- Japanese destroyer Yanagi (1917), a Momo-class destroyer launched in 1917 and stricken in 1940
- Japanese destroyer Yanagi (1944), a Matsu-class destroyer launched in 1944 and sunk in 1945
