= Entropy (magazine) =

American online magazine (2014–2023)

- Website type: Online magazine
- Available in: English
- Headquarters: {{{location_country}}}
- Creators: Peter Tieryas and Janice Lee
- Editors: Janice Lee, Executive Editor
- Website: entropymag.org
- Launched: March 20, 2014; 12 years ago

Entropy was an online magazine that covered literary and related non-literary content. The magazine featured personal essays, reviews, experimental literature, poetry, interviews, as well as writings on small press culture, video games, performance, graphic novels, interactive literature, science fiction, fantasy, music, film, art, translation, and other topics. Entropy's website also functioned as a place where those within the literary community could interact.

After its launch, the magazine attracted notable contributors, such as Will Alexander, John Vercher, Seo-Young Chu, Amish Trivedi, Gabino Iglesias, C. Kubasta, Justin Petropoulos, Daniel Borzutzky, Anne Casey, Michael J. Seidlinger, and others. It was widely known for its yearly lists of the best poetry, articles, music, and more. Over its existence, Entropy also established a reputation as being as safe publishing space for essays written on the subject of #MeToo and related issues.

In June 2017, Civil Coping Mechanisms, Entropy, and Writ Large Press created a partnership, known as The Accomplices. In August 2018, they formed The Accomplices LLC and launched their new website and cohesive brand in January 2019. The group publishes books, produces literary workshops and events, creates videos and other media, and runs a literary website and community space.

In 2021, the editorial staff announced the rolling closure of the site. Following this, they no longer published new content but kept the site live through 2022. As of 2023, the group has deleted its website and socials.
