= Sori Yanagi =

Japanese industrial designer (1915–2011)

Sōri Yanagi
- 柳 宗理
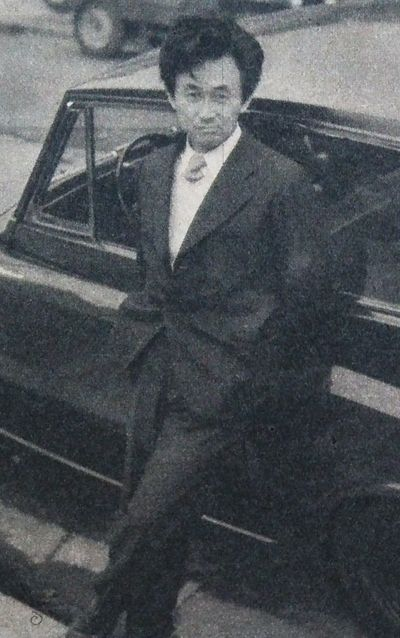
- Yanagi in 1952
- Born: June 29, 1915; Tokyo, Japan
- Died: December 25, 2011 (aged 96); Tokyo, Japan
- Education: Tokyo Art School
- Notable work: Butterfly Stool (1954), Elephant Stool (1954)
- Father: Yanagi Sōetsu

Sōri Yanagi (柳 宗理, Yanagi Sōri; 29 June 1915 – 25 December 2011) was a Japanese industrial designer. He played a role in Japanese modern design developed after World War II to the high-growth period in the Japanese economy. He is both a representative of the wholly Japanese modern designer and a full-blown modernist who merged simplicity and practicality with elements of traditional Japanese crafts.

== Early life ==
Yanagi was born in 1915 in Tokyo, Japan. His father is Yanagi Sōetsu, founder of the Japanese folk crafts mingei movement, which celebrated the beauty of everyday objects, and the Japanese Folk Crafts Museum (Nihon Mingeikan). Sōri entered Tokyo Art School (now, Tokyo University of the Arts) in 1934, where he studied both art and architecture.

== Career ==
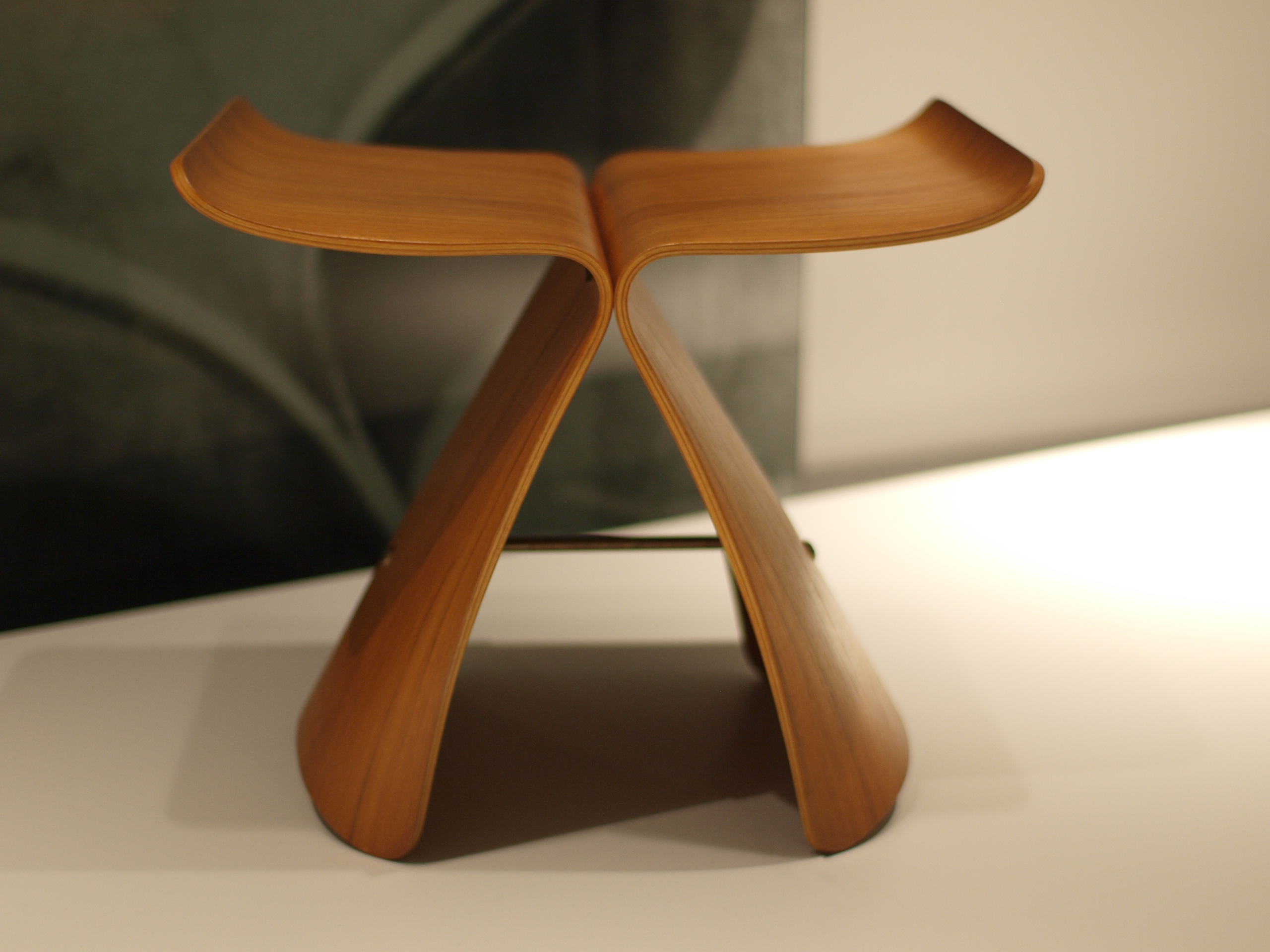
Butterfly Stool (1954)

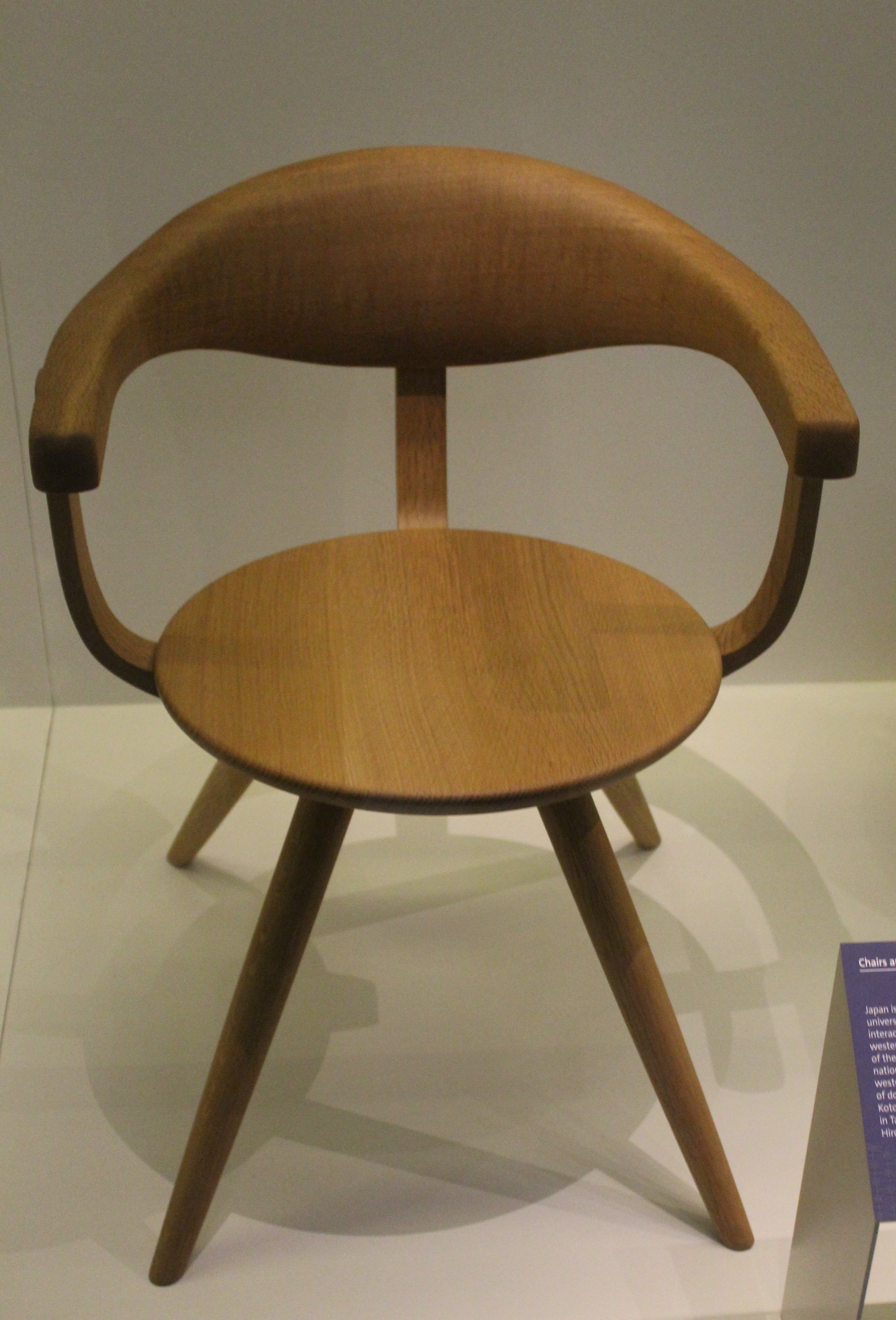
Armchair model YD261A (1978)

Yanagi was influenced by Le Corbusier as well as by Charlotte Perriand, whom he translated for when she was in Tokyo during the early 1940s. Perriand introduced him to product design, and his interests later moved from painting to buildings to design and objects.

Most of Yanagi's designs are very simple and beautiful. His products illustrate his thinking: true beauty is not made, it is born naturally. When he created a new product, he made the first versions over and over by hand, seeking new forms that took shape from both new and old ideas.

After World War II, Yanagi designed a wide range of products: furniture, three-wheeled vehicles, Olympic cauldrons, pedestrian overpasses, etc. One of the most famous pieces of furniture is his Butterfly Stool which won a gold prize at the Milan Triennial XI. Announced in 1956, its 2-piece form has been compared to a butterfly's open wings. Alternately, the shape can be seen as the gateway of a Shinto shrine or even an antique samurai helmet. In effect, it is a form that is both modern and timeless, that has won critical acclaim and prizes, and is included in major collections such as the Metropolitan Museum and the Museum of Modern Art in New York, the Rubell Museum, the Victoria and Albert Museum in London, amongst others.

In 1958 Yanagi assisted in the founding of the Japan Interior Architects/Designers' Association. He led the organization together with Isamu Kenmochi and Riki Watanabe.

Yanagi designed the official torch for the 1972 Winter Olympics in Sapporo, Japan.

Sōri Yanagi died in 2011 at the age of 96.

== Key designs ==
- Elephant Stool, 1954
- Butterfly Stool, 1956
- Stainless steel kettle, 1960s

== Honours ==
- Honorary Royal Designer for Industry (UK), 2008
