= Yanagi Sōetsu =

Japanese art critic and philosopher (1889–1961)

- 柳 宗悦
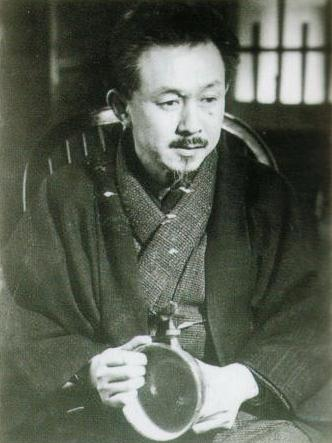
- Yanagi in 1950
- Born: March 21, 1889
- Died: May 3, 1961 (aged 72)
- Education: University of Tokyo
- Known for: Founder of the mingei (folk craft) movement
- Movement: Mingei (Folk craft)
- Children: Sori Yanagi
- Relatives: Shinya Yanagi, Yoshihiro Yanagi, Sou Yanagi
- Awards: Order of Cultural Merit (South Korea), 3rd grade

Yanagi Sōetsu (Japanese: 柳 宗悦; March 21, 1889 – May 3, 1961), also known as Yanagi Muneyoshi, was a Japanese art critic, philosopher, and founder of the mingei (folk craft) movement in Japan in the late 1920s and 1930s.

== Personal life ==
Yanagi was born in 1889 to Yanagi Narayoshi, a hydrographer of the Imperial Navy and Katsuko.Yanagi Sōetsu was born in Tokyo, the political, economic, and cultural center of Japan. His family was wealthy and belonged to the nobility. His father was a member of the nobility and a retired rear admiral in the navy. He was known for his skills and wide knowledge in many fields. His mother also came from a family of naval officers.His father died when he was less than two years old, but he still grew up in Tokyo and received an elite education. He graduated from the Department of Literature psychology at Tokyo Imperial University.When he was in his thirties, after encountering ordinary and functional craft objects, he named them mingei. This also gave his career direction became clear. After that, he considers himself the founder of Mingei theory and the leader of the Mingei movement.

His son, Sori Yanagi, was a renowned industrial designer. His great grandnephew Shinya Yanagi is a renowned weaver, and the third generation of the Yanagi family of weavers.

== Career ==
Yanagi was not an artist or craftsman himself.

In 1916, Yanagi made his first trip to Korea to visit his sister and out of curiosity about Korean crafts. During this period he met Asakawa Yoshitaka and Asakawa Takumi. He became more interested in Korean crafts after spending time with the two brothers. After that, he also became interested in some objects from the Joseon Dynasty, and then he visited Korea many times and bought different kinds of objects there. The trip led to the establishment of the Korean Folk Crafts Museum in 1924 and the coining of the term mingei by Yanagi, potters Hamada Shōji (1894–1978) and Kawai Kanjirō (1890–1966).

His theory of the "beauty of sorrow" (悲哀の美) in Korean art has been said to have influenced the development of the Korean idea of han. Following the March First Movement, Korea's independence movement in which thousands of Koreans died at the hands of the Japanese police and military, Yanagi wrote articles in 1919 and 1920, expressing sympathy for the Korean people and appreciation for Korean art.

Yanagi cautioned against the Korean independence movement.

During the New Year of 1924, he encountering an art form he had never seen before, whic is mokujikibutsu. After that, he went to different areas of Japan and began to study Mokujiki Shōnin. As he traveled around Japan, he slowly began to notice and learn about traditional crafts and the actual state of craftwork in different areas.

In 1924, he founded the Korean Folk-arts Gallery in Seoul with the Asakawa brothers.

In 1925, Yanagi Sōetsu, Kawai, and Hamada went together to see mokujikibutsu. After that, they created the word mingei together.

In 1926, the Folk Art Movement was formally declared by Yanagi. He rescued lowly pots used by commoners in the Edo and Meiji periods that were disappearing in rapidly urbanizing Japan. In 1936, the Japanese Folk Crafts Museum (Nihon Mingeikan) was established.

By 1927, he had developed his aesthetic theory related to getemono. This theory later contributed to the Mingei movement.

He was also working together with Onta ware.

=== Mingei theory ===
Yanagi Sōetsu strongly believed that his theory and ideas were his own and original because he discovered the value by chance and without any connection to existing ideas. The philosophical pillar of mingei is "hand-crafted art of ordinary people" (民衆的工芸, minshū-teki kōgei). Yanagi Sōetsu discovered beauty in everyday ordinary and utilitarian objects created by nameless and unknown craftsmen. According to Yanagi, utilitarian objects made by the common people are "beyond beauty and ugliness". Below are a few criteria of mingei art and crafts:

- made by anonymous crafts people
- produced by hand in quantity
- inexpensive
- used by the masses
- functional in daily life
- representative of the region in which it was produced.

Yanagi's book The Unknown Craftsman has become an influential work since its first release in English in 1972. It examines the Japanese way of viewing and appreciating art and beauty in everyday crafts that include pottery, lacquer, textiles, and woodwork.

Yanagi was editor of Kōgei ('Crafts'), the journal of the Japanese Folk Arts Association, issued between 1931 and 1951.

Yanagi was an honored lecturer in the Pottery seminar at Black Mountain College in 1952 in the USA, attended by many younger and later prominent potters.

== Legacy ==
In 1984, Yanagi was posthumously awarded the Bogwan Order of Cultural Merit, the first to be awarded to a non-Korean.

Yanagi was a considerable influence over the likes of potter Bernard Leach, sculptor Isamu Noguchi, and architect Bruno Taut.
